= Feldafing =

- Municipality
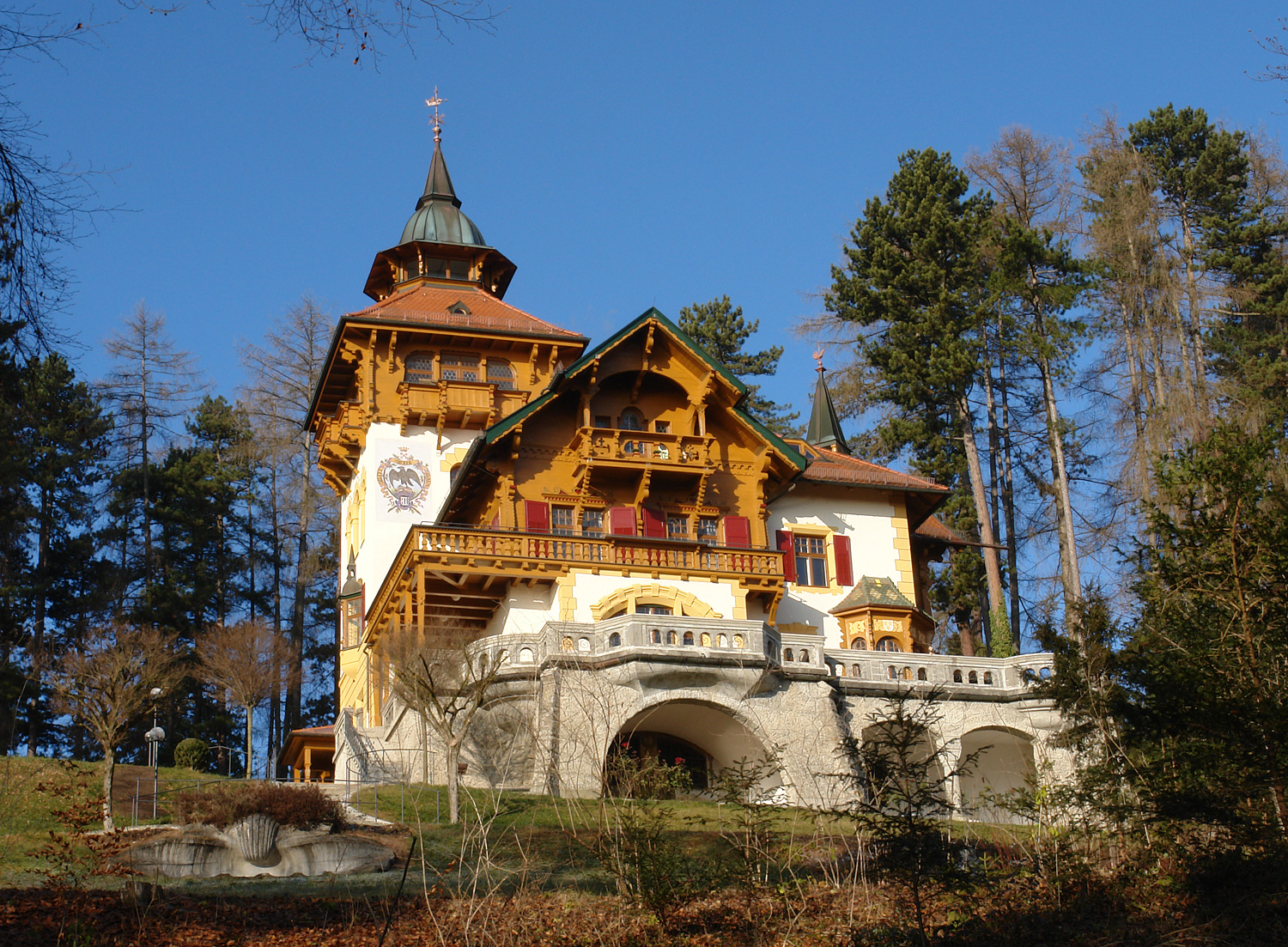
- Villa Waldberta

- Coat of arms

- Location of Feldafing within Starnberg district
- Interactive map of Feldafing
- Location within Germany Location within Bavaria
- Coordinates: 47°57′N 11°18′E
- Country: Germany
- State: Bavaria
- Admin. region: Oberbayern
- District: Starnberg

Government
  - Mayor (2020–26): Bernhard Sontheim

Area
  - Total: 9.15 km^{2} (3.53 sq mi)
- Elevation: 646 m (2,119 ft)

Population (2025-12-31)
  - Total: 4,349
  - Density: 475/km^{2} (1,230/sq mi)
- Time zone: UTC+01:00 (CET)
  - Summer (DST): UTC+02:00 (CEST)
- Postal codes: 82340
- Dialling codes: 08157 / 08158
- Vehicle registration: STA
- Website: www.feldafing.de

Feldafing (German: [ˈfɛldafɪŋ]) is a municipality in Starnberg district, Bavaria, Germany, and is located on the west shore of Lake Starnberg, southwest of Munich.

== History ==
The history of Feldafing begins on the Roseninsel or Rose Island, the only island in Lake Starnberg. This area has been inhabited since as early as the Neolithic Period. Feldafing is also well known for the Hotel Kaiserin Elisabeth. Both places (Roseninsel and Kaiserin Elisabeth) were favorite vacation spots for the Austrian Empress Elisabeth of Bavaria ("Sisi").

The name Feldafing is presumably of Bavarian origin. The earliest record of the use of Feldafing is from 1116. At that time, Feldafing was ruled by Ruodolfus de Veldovingen, a member of the Berthold von Andechs family. Since the middle of the 14th century, Feldafing and the Rose Island have belonged to the House of Wittelsbach. Feldafing was, at that time, the largest fishing village on Lake Starnberg.

At the beginning of the 15th century (1401), Feldafing's Catholic Church was constructed. This church was located most probably on the same site where the Catholic St. Peter and Paul Church stands today.

The 17th century brought a series of changes for Feldafing, mostly including territorial disputes between various patrician families. In 1850, King Maximilian II, who had known the area of Feldafing since his childhood, acquired the Roseninsel, where he built a Villa in Pompeii-style and a garden house. It was through the planning of the rotunda of roses in the Villa's garden that the Roseninsel, previously called Wörth, earned its name.

King Ludwig II adored the Roseninsel and visited it often. The island was also said to have served as a meeting place for the king and his cousin, the Austrian Empress Elisabeth of Bavaria. Today the island is host to a Villa museum, the beautiful preserved gardens, and various musical and cultural events.

The more recent history of Feldafing begins with the construction of the railway line in 1864. The former fishing and farming village was transformed. Around the turn of the 20th century, a Villa quarter arose in Feldafing. In 1890 there were approximately 70 houses in Feldafing, and in 1933 there were more than 170. Between 1890 and 1933 the population more than doubled, totaling 1,185 people in 1933. Another population boom took place after World War II through an influx of refugees and displaced persons.

After World War I, a golf course was built in Feldafing, one of the first in Germany. Afterwards, other recreation centers such as a beach and tennis club were built. The park and the Rose Island are currently being restored by the Bavarian Administration for State Villas, Gardens and Lakes to their original condition.

During the Nazi era, Feldafing was the site of an elite school of the Nazi Party, the "Reichsschule Feldafing" (one of its students was Martin Adolf Bormann, the son of Martin Bormann, Adolf Hitler's private secretary and head of the Nazi Party Chancellery), and of a subcamp of the Dachau concentration camp. After the end of World War II, Feldafing became part of the American zone of occupation. The military administration converted the former Reichsschule and the subcamp into the Feldafing displaced persons camp, part of a network of displaced persons camps for Jewish Holocaust survivors in the US Zone in Bavaria.

== Infrastructure ==
Feldafing station is served in either twenty- or forty-minute intervals by S-Bahn line 6 of the Munich S-Bahn towards the neighboring Tutzing station or towards Munich. The autobahn A952 begins in Starnberg, offering a connection to Munich or Garmisch-Partenkirchen. While traveling on the highway B2 Feldafing can be reached either over Pöcking, Traubing or Wieling. In addition, the St2063-road connects Tutzing, Feldafing and Possenhofen and due to its location along the shore of Lake Starnberg is known by locals as the "Lake street".

== World Heritage Site ==
It is home to one or more prehistoric pile-dwelling (or stilt house) settlements that are part of the Prehistoric Pile dwellings around the Alps UNESCO World Heritage Site.

== See also ==
- Edward Harrison Compton
