= Starnberg Nord station =

Railway station in Bavaria

Starnberg Nord
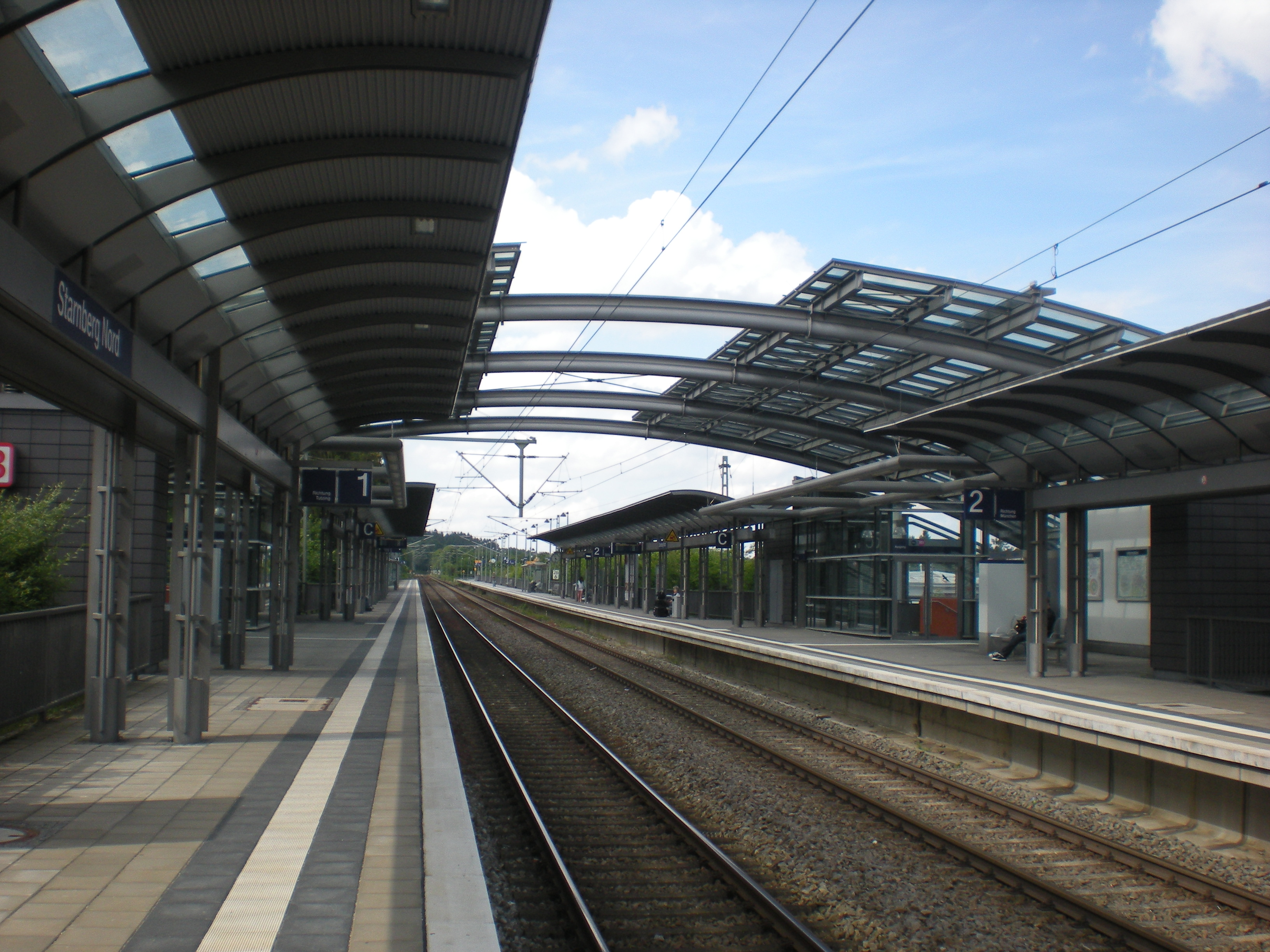
- The station in 2013

General information
- Location: Hans-Zellner-Weg 1 Starnberg, Bavaria; Germany
- Coordinates: 48°00′22″N 11°20′51″E
- Owner: DB Netz
- Operator: DB Station&Service
- Lines: Munich–Garmisch-Partenkirchen line (KBS 960)
- Distance: 26.7 km (16.6 mi) from München Hauptbahnhof
- Platforms: 2 side platforms
- Tracks: 2
- Train operators: DB Regio Bayern
- Connections: 902, 904, 905, 909, 950, 951, 955, 961, 975

Other information
- Station code: 4750
- DS100 code: MSNO
- IBNR: 8005675
- Category: 4
- Fare zone: : 2 and 3

Services
Preceding station	Munich S-Bahn	Following station
Starnberg towards Tutzing	S6	Gauting towards Ebersberg
Location

Starnberg Nord station (German: Bahnhof Starnberg Nord) is a railway station in the municipality of Starnberg, in Bavaria, Germany. It is located on the Munich–Garmisch-Partenkirchen railway of Deutsche Bahn.

== Services ==
As of the December 2021 timetable change, the following services stop at Starnberg Nord:

- Munich S-Bahn S6: service every twenty minutes between Tutzing and Grafing Bahnhof; some trains continue from Grafing Bahnhof to Ebersberg.
