= Possenhofen station =

Railway station in Bavaria

Possenhofen
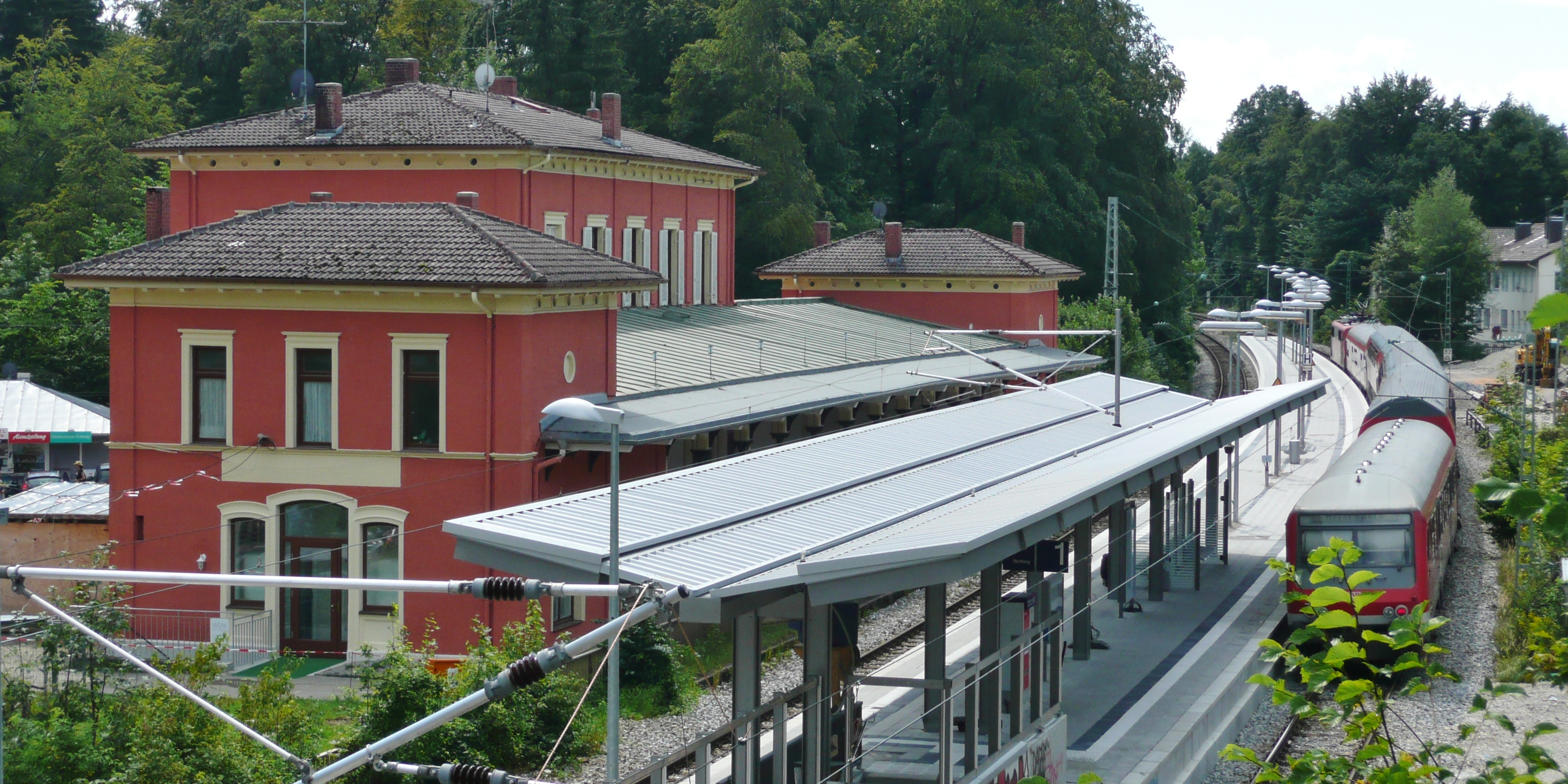
- The station in 2011

General information
- Location: Schloßberg 2 Pöcking, Bavaria; Germany
- Coordinates: 47°57′43″N 11°18′23″E
- Owner: DB Netz
- Operator: DB Station&Service
- Lines: Munich–Garmisch-Partenkirchen line (KBS 960)
- Distance: 32.7 km (20.3 mi) from München Hauptbahnhof
- Platforms: 1 island platform
- Tracks: 2
- Train operators: S-Bahn München
- Connections: 956, 976

Other information
- Station code: 5006
- DS100 code: MPH
- IBNR: 8004874
- Category: 4
- Fare zone: : 3 and 4

Services
Preceding station	Munich S-Bahn	Following station
Feldafing towards Tutzing	S6	Starnberg towards Ebersberg
Location

Possenhofen station (German: Bahnhof Possenhofen) is a railway station in the municipality of Pöcking, in Bavaria, Germany. It is located on the Munich–Garmisch-Partenkirchen railway of Deutsche Bahn.

== Services ==
As of the December 2021 timetable change, the following services stop at Possenhofen:

- Munich S-Bahn S6: service every twenty minutes between Tutzing and Grafing Bahnhof; some trains continue from Grafing Bahnhof to Ebersberg.
