= Gauting station =

Railway station in Bavaria

Gauting
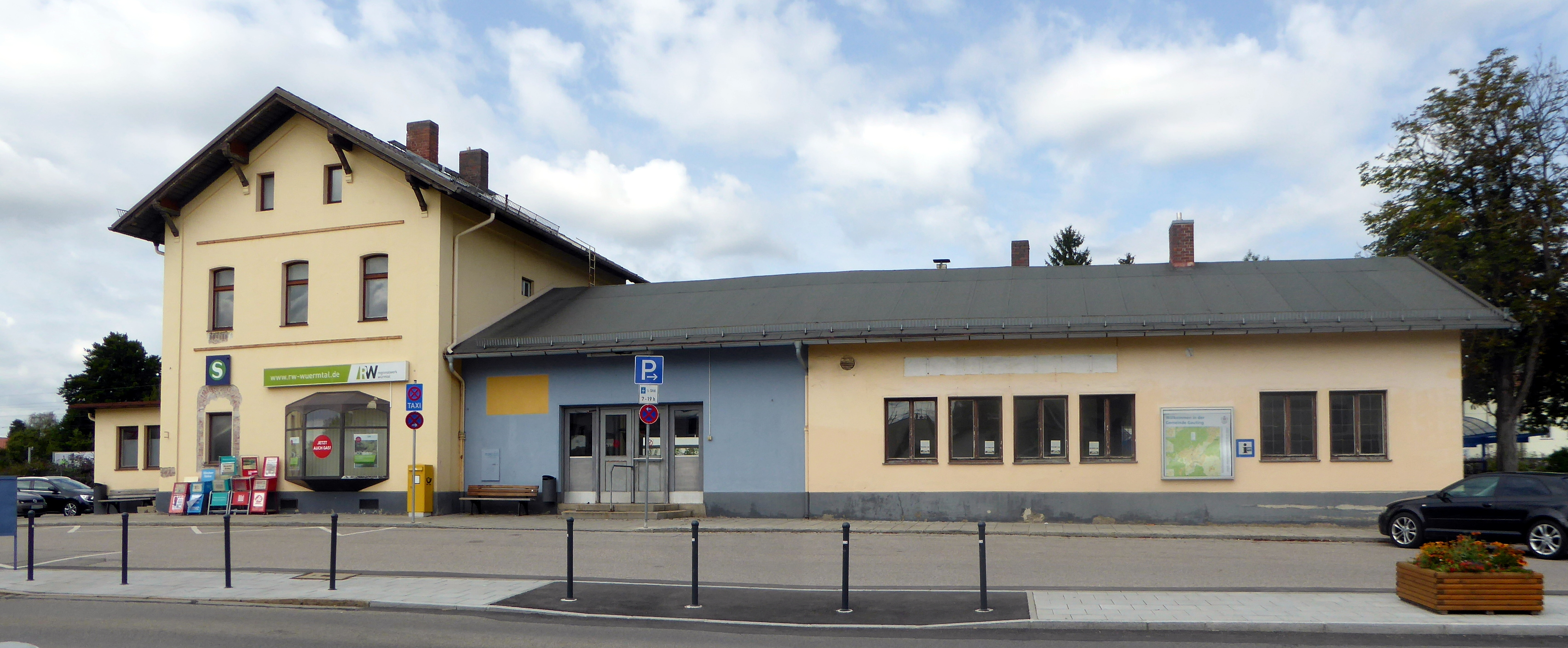
- The station building in 2017

General information
- Location: Bahnhofsplatz 1 Gauting, Bavaria; Germany
- Coordinates: 48°04′15″N 11°22′34″E
- Owner: DB Netz
- Operator: DB Station&Service
- Lines: Munich–Garmisch-Partenkirchen line (KBS 960)
- Distance: 18.9 km (11.7 mi) from München Hauptbahnhof
- Platforms: 1 island platform
- Tracks: 2
- Train operators: S-Bahn München
- Connections: 906, 949, 962, 963, 965, 966, 968, 969, X910

Other information
- Station code: 2024
- DS100 code: MGT
- IBNR: 8002198
- Category: 4
- Fare zone: : 1 and 2

History
- Opened: 16 March 1854; 172 years ago
- Electrified: 16 March 1925; 101 years ago

Services
Preceding station	Munich S-Bahn	Following station
Starnberg Nord towards Tutzing	S6	Stockdorf towards Ebersberg
Location

Gauting station (German: Bahnhof Gauting) is a railway station in the municipality of Gauting, in Bavaria, Germany. It is located on the Munich–Garmisch-Partenkirchen railway of Deutsche Bahn.

== Services ==
As of the December 2021 timetable change, the following services stop at Gauting:

- Munich S-Bahn S6: service every twenty minutes between Tutzing and Grafing Bahnhof; some trains continue from Grafing Bahnhof to Ebersberg.
