= Starnberg station =

Railway station in Bavaria

Starnberg
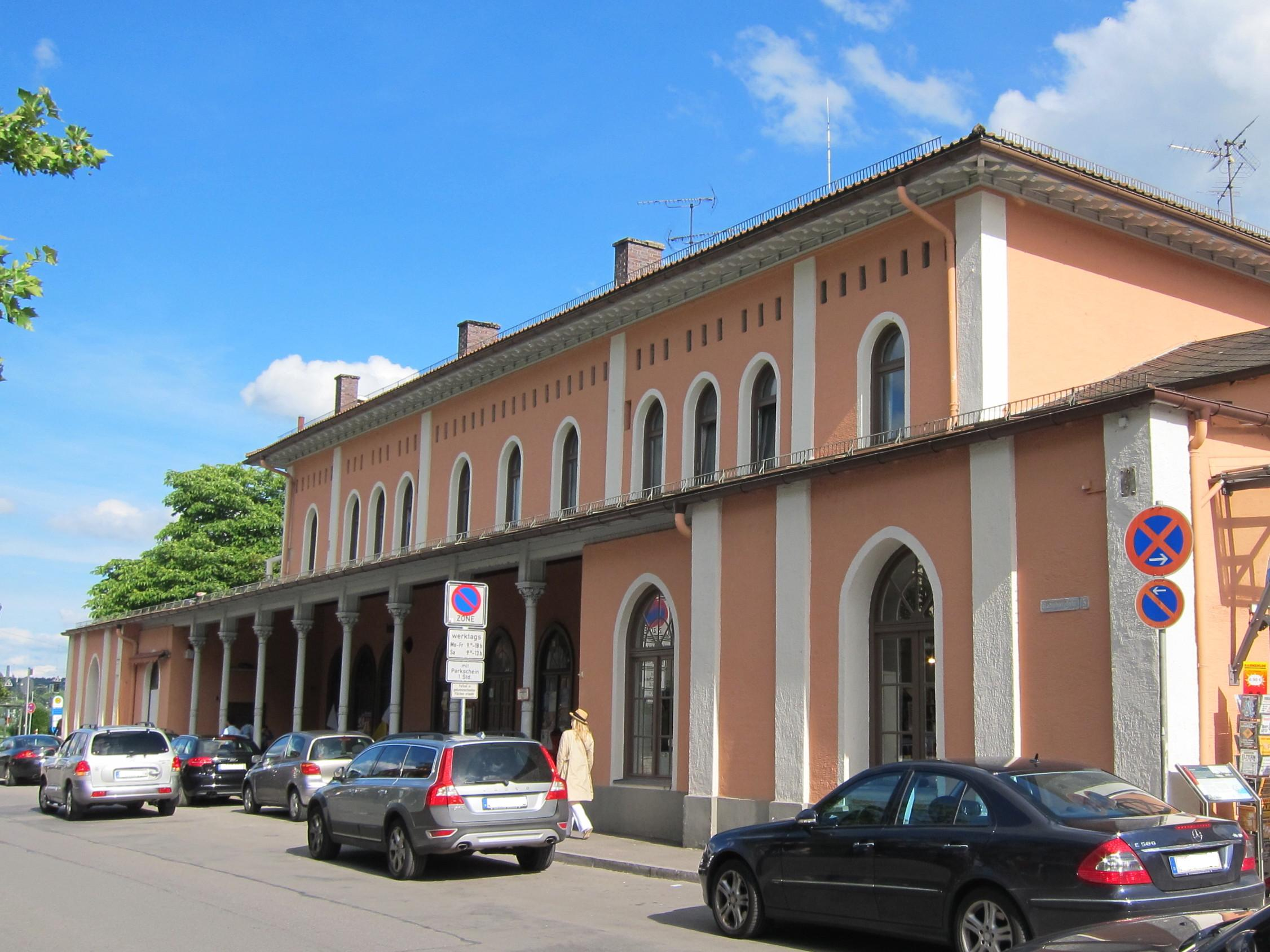
- The station building in 2011

General information
- Location: Bahnhofsplatz 5 Starnberg, Bavaria; Germany
- Coordinates: 47°59′47″N 11°20′36″E
- Owner: DB Netz
- Operator: DB Station&Service
- Lines: Munich–Garmisch-Partenkirchen line (KBS 960)
- Distance: 27.9 km (17.3 mi) from München Hauptbahnhof
- Platforms: 2 island platforms
- Tracks: 4
- Train operators: DB Regio Bayern
- Connections: 901, 902, 903, 905, 909, 956, 975, X900, X970; Bayerische Seenschifffahrt ferries

Other information
- Station code: 5970
- DS100 code: MST
- IBNR: 8005676
- Category: 4
- Fare zone: : 2 and 3

Services
Preceding station	DB Regio Bayern	Following station
Tutzing towards Garmisch-Partenkirchen	RB 6	Munich-Pasing towards München Hbf
Tutzing towards Reutte in Tirol	RB 60 Limited service	Munich-Pasing One-way operation
Tutzing towards Weilheim (Oberbay)	RB 65	Munich-Pasing towards München Hbf
Tutzing towards Kochel	RB 66	Munich-Pasing towards München Hbf
Preceding station	Munich S-Bahn	Following station
Possenhofen towards Tutzing	S6	Starnberg Nord towards Ebersberg
Location

Starnberg station (German: Bahnhof Starnberg) is a railway station in the municipality of Starnberg, in Bavaria, Germany. It is located on the Munich–Garmisch-Partenkirchen railway of Deutsche Bahn.

== Services ==
As of the December 2021 timetable change, the following services stop at Starnberg:

- RB: hourly service between München Hauptbahnhof and Weilheim (Oberbay) or Kochel.
- Munich S-Bahn S6: service every twenty minutes between Tutzing and Grafing Bahnhof; some trains continue from Grafing Bahnhof to Ebersberg.
