= Feldafing station =

Railway station in Germany

Feldafing
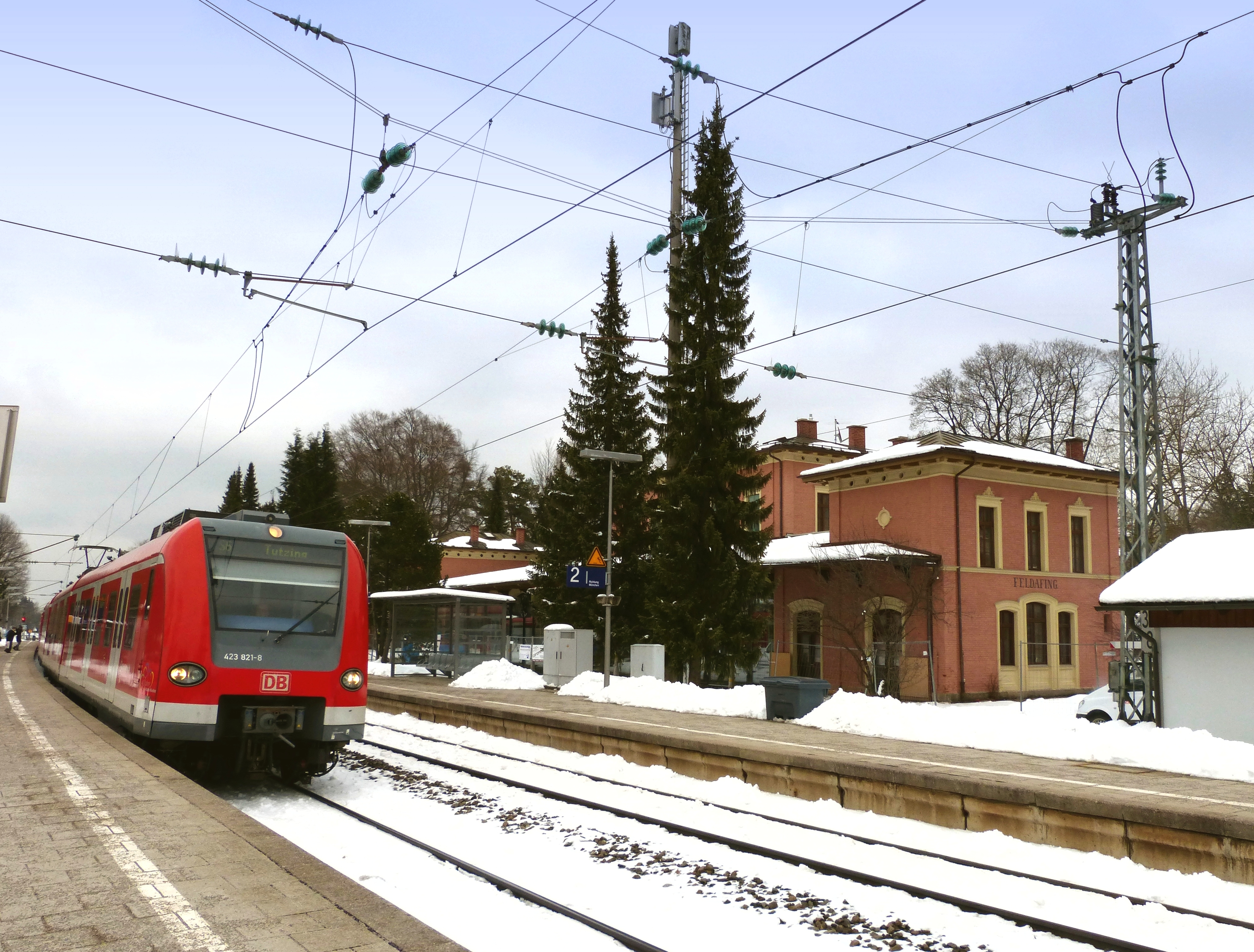
- Station buildings and platforms

General information
- Location: Feldafing, Bavaria; Germany
- Coordinates: 47°56′49″N 11°17′25″E
- Owner: Deutsche Bahn
- Operator: DB Netz; DB Station&Service
- Line: Munich–Garmisch-Partenkirchen railway (34.8 km)
- Platforms: 2 side platforms
- Tracks: 2
- Train operators: S-Bahn München
- Connections: 976, 978

Construction
- Accessible: No

Other information
- Station code: 1770
- DS100 code: MFA
- IBNR: 8001970
- Category: 5
- Fare zone: : 3 and 4
- Website: stationsdatenbank.de; www.bahnhof.de

History
- Opened: 1 July 1865

Services
Preceding station	Munich S-Bahn	Following station
Tutzing Terminus	S6	Possenhofen towards Ebersberg
Location

Feldafing station is the only station of the Bavarian town of Feldafing and a station on the Munich S-Bahn. It is classified by Deutsche Bahn as a category 5 station and has two platform tracks. The station is located on the Munich–Garmisch-Partenkirchen railway.

== History ==
The railway line from Munich to Starnberg was opened in 1854. On 1 July 1865, Feldafing station was opened along with the extension of the line to Weilheim. In 1900 and 1901 platform subway was built at the station. In 1902 the line was duplicated. Since 1972, the station has only been served by Munich S-Bahn trains.

=== Station building ===
The station building of 1865 was built on the Munich–Garmisch-Partenkirchen line to a design in the style of the Maximilian age by Georg von Dollmann, the district engineer of the Royal Bavarian State Railways.

Dollmann created a two-storey entrance building with flat hip roof and exposed brick. It allegedly used stones that were intended for the castle in the park. The main building is flanked by two symmetrical pavilions that are connected by wings to the main building. On the ground floor of the main building there were a ticket hall, a freight-handling office and a waiting room for royalty. In the attached buildings there were first-, second- and third-class waiting rooms. Upstairs were the living and service rooms for rail employees and the stationmaster. There is a platform canopy in front of the entrance building on the home platform. The facade of the building has external elements made of Haustein stone and classical details.

== Infrastructure ==
The station is served by line S 6 of the Munich S-Bahn. There is a bus stop and parking nearby, but the station does not have barrier-free access for the disabled.

The two side platforms in Feldafing station are 210 metres long and 76 cm high.
