= Munich-Pasing station =

Railway station in Munich, Germany

München Pasing
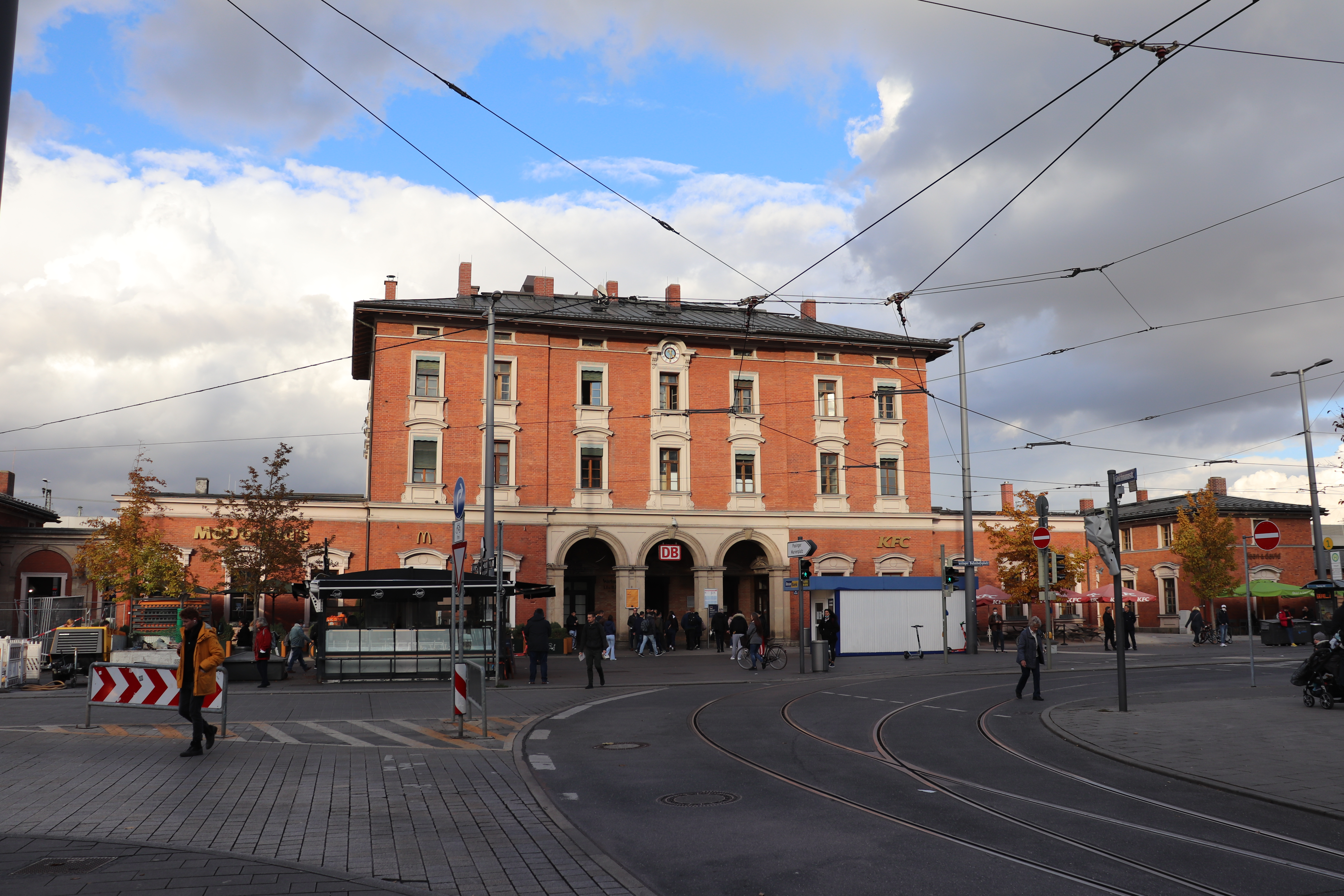
- Entrance building (south side)

General information
- Location: Pasinger Bahnhofsplatz 7-9 6-10, Pasing-Obermenzing, Munich, Bavaria; Germany
- Coordinates: 48°9′0″N 11°27′41″E
- Owner: Deutsche Bahn
- Operator: DB Netz; DB Station&Service
- Lines: Munich–Ulm (KBS 980 / 999.3); Munich–Buchloe (KBS 970 / 999.4); Munich–Garmisch-Partenkirchen (KBS 960 / 961 / 999.6); Munich–Herrsching (KBS 999.8); S-Bahn trunk line (KBS 999)
- Platforms: 9
- Connections: 130, 157, 159, 160, 161, 162, 259, 265, HEX, N77, N80, N81, X730, X732

Construction
- Accessible: Yes (not platform 2)

Other information
- Station code: 4266
- DS100 code: MP
- Category: 2
- Fare zone: : M and 1
- Website: stationsdatenbank.de; www.bahnhof.de

History
- Opened: 7 October 1840 (original station); 1873 (current station)

Passengers
- 2008: 85,000 daily, including approximately 65,000 S-Bahn

Services
Preceding station	DB Fernverkehr	Following station
Augsburg Hbf towards Berlin Gesundbrunnen	ICE 11	München Hbf Terminus
Augsburg Hbf towards Berlin Gesundbrunnen or Hamburg-Altona	ICE 18	München Hbf Terminus
Augsburg Hbf towards Hamburg-Altona	ICE 24	München Hbf towards Innsbruck Hbf or Schwarzach-St.Veit
Augsburg Hbf towards Hamburg-Altona	ICE 25	München Hbf Terminus
Augsburg Hbf towards Hamburg-Altona	ICE 42	München Hbf Terminus
Augsburg Hbf towards Karlsruhe Hbf, Basel SBB or Saarbrücken Hbf	ICE 60	München Hbf Terminus
Augsburg Hbf towards Amsterdam Centraal	ICE 78	München Hbf Terminus
Preceding station	DB Regio Bayern	Following station
Weilheim (Oberbay) towards Mittenwald	RE 61	München Hbf Terminus
Weilheim (Oberbay) towards Lermoos	RE 62	München Hbf Terminus
Geltendorf towards Lindau-Insel	RE 70	München Hbf Terminus
Geltendorf towards Oberstdorf	RE 76	München Hbf Terminus
Tutzing towards Innsbruck Hbf	RB 6	München Hbf Terminus
Tutzing towards Pfronten-Steinach	RB 60	München Hbf Terminus
Starnberg towards Weilheim (Oberbay)	RB 65	München Hbf Terminus
Starnberg towards Kochel	RB 66	München Hbf Terminus
Fürstenfeldbruck towards Buchloe	RB 74	München Hbf Terminus
Preceding station		Following station
Mering towards Ulm Hbf	RE 9	München Hbf Terminus
Mering towards Würzburg Hbf	RE 80	München Hbf Terminus
Mering towards Aalen Hbf	RE 89	München Hbf Terminus
Mammendorf towards Dinkelscherben	RB 86	München Hbf Terminus
Mammendorf towards Donauwörth	RB 87	München Hbf Terminus
Geltendorf towards Memmingen	RE 72	München Hbf Terminus
Buchloe towards Lindau-Reutin	RE 96	München Hbf Terminus
Preceding station		Following station
Geltendorf towards Füssen	RB 68	München Hbf Terminus
Preceding station	Munich S-Bahn	Following station
Langwied towards Mammendorf	S3	Laim towards Holzkirchen
Leienfelsstraße towards Geltendorf	S4	Laim towards Ebersberg
Westkreuz towards Tutzing	S6	Laim towards Ebersberg
Westkreuz towards Herrsching	S8	Laim towards Flughafen
Aubing towards Geltendorf	S20	Heimeranplatz towards Höllriegelskreuth
Location

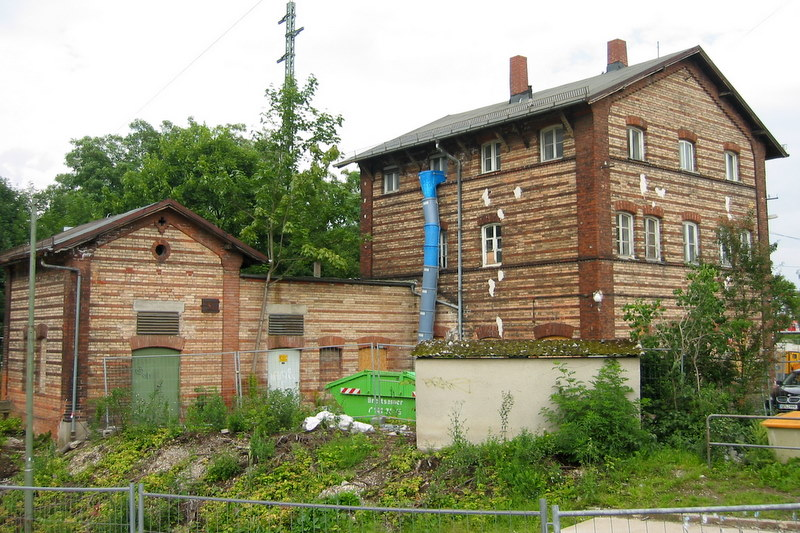
Old Pasing station, 2008

Munich-Pasing is a railway station in the west of Munich. It is the third-largest station in the city, after München Hauptbahnhof and München Ost.

== History ==
When the first Munich railway was built from Munich to Lochhausen on the western outskirts of Munich in 1839, a station with two wooden huts was built in the municipality of Pasing. The line was completed to Augsburg on 7 October 1840. In 1847, a brick station building designed by Friedrich Bürklein was built on the southern side of the railway tracks in Pasing. Bürklein also designed the Munich Central Station (Hauptbahnhof), the Maximilianeum and the brickwork of the Maximilianstraße. The station building, a two-story building with two wings and a waiting room is the oldest surviving railway station in Bavaria. The line to Starnberg was opened on 21 May 1854.

When the construction of another line from Munich west to Buchloe began a short time later in 1873, the station had to be expanded to six tracks with 25 houses for railway workers due to the strong growth of the town. This was accompanied by the construction of a new, larger station building. The current station building was designed by George Frederick Seidel and is heritage-listed; it was built about one hundred metres west of the old "Bürklein station" and opened to the public on 1 May 1873. A goods shed was built to the north of the tracks.

Pasing quickly became a popular destination for excursions and the station became a major transport hub due to its convenient transport links to the neighbouring city of Munich and its location at a junction with four lines—in 1903 was the last line was added to Herrsching. 64,842 tickets were sold at Pasing station in 1874 and the figure was more than a million in 1900. In 1905, trains ran at 7.5-minute intervals on the 12 minute run between Pasing and Munich Hauptbahnhof—a train density, which comes close to the current S-Bahn service. The development of Pasing as a "college town" in western Munich promoted traffic. The freight station was established east of the passenger station about 1900. The lines passing through Pasing were electrified between 1916 and 1927.

The station was renamed München-Pasing on 1 October 1938 after the Nazi regime had forced the annexation of Pasing by Munich. The Reichsbahnbaudirektion (Reichsbahn Construction Authority) had far-reaching plans to transform the railway facilities in Munich, including the conversion of Munich Hauptbahnhof into a through station and it relocation to the vicinity of Friedenheimer Bridge and the construction of a boulevard between Stachus and Pasing. Because of the outbreak of war, only the construction of a train depot to the west of Pasing station, which was redesignated as the Westbahnhof (west station), and a smaller construction depot were in fact built. The idea that was developed at this time of building an S-Bahn system in Munich was not implemented until nearly 30 years after the war.

Between 1951 and 1958, as part of a comprehensive expansion of capacity, the entire track area was shifted by about 60 metres to the north and lowered by about two metres. The old platforms were removed or replaced. The station underpass under the western part of the station was rebuilt as a mail and baggage tunnel with lifts to the platforms. The station building was now separated from the railway tracks. Furthermore, from 1954 to 1957, the former six signal boxes at Pasing station were replaced by a relay interlocking built by Siemens & Halske. This work cost 34 million marks. Finally in 1959, the approach to the line towards Augsburg was rebuilt with a flying junction so entries and exits from the station to the Augsburg line could run independently from traffic running to the depot to the west of the station.

On 28 May 1972, a few months before the opening of the Summer Olympics in Munich, the Munich S-Bahn went into regular operation. This was accompanied in the Pasing station area with further modifications of the junctions of the four suburban lines as an important junction for the new S-Bahn network. The tracks running to Westkreuz (now lines S 6 and S 8) now ran under the lines towards Aubing (S 4) and Lochhausen (S 3).

In addition to the numerous S-Bahn services, long-distance services stopped in Pasing. While originally Intercity (IC) trains only stopped at Pasing station in the peak hours, Pasing was upgraded in the timetable of the summer of 1991 as an IC network station. Since 1992 Pasing has been connected directly to Munich Airport by line S 8 at 20-minute intervals.

== Current situation ==
Pasing station is currently used by 85,000 daily passengers and is the fourth busiest station in Bavaria. Most of the regional and long-distance trains, including several ICE and IC services operated by Deutsche Bahn towards Augsburg, Buchloe and Tutzing and Alex services to Lindau and Oberstdorf, stop in Pasing and are timed to stop at about 0 and 30 minutes past each hour in order to create connections.

=== Railways ===
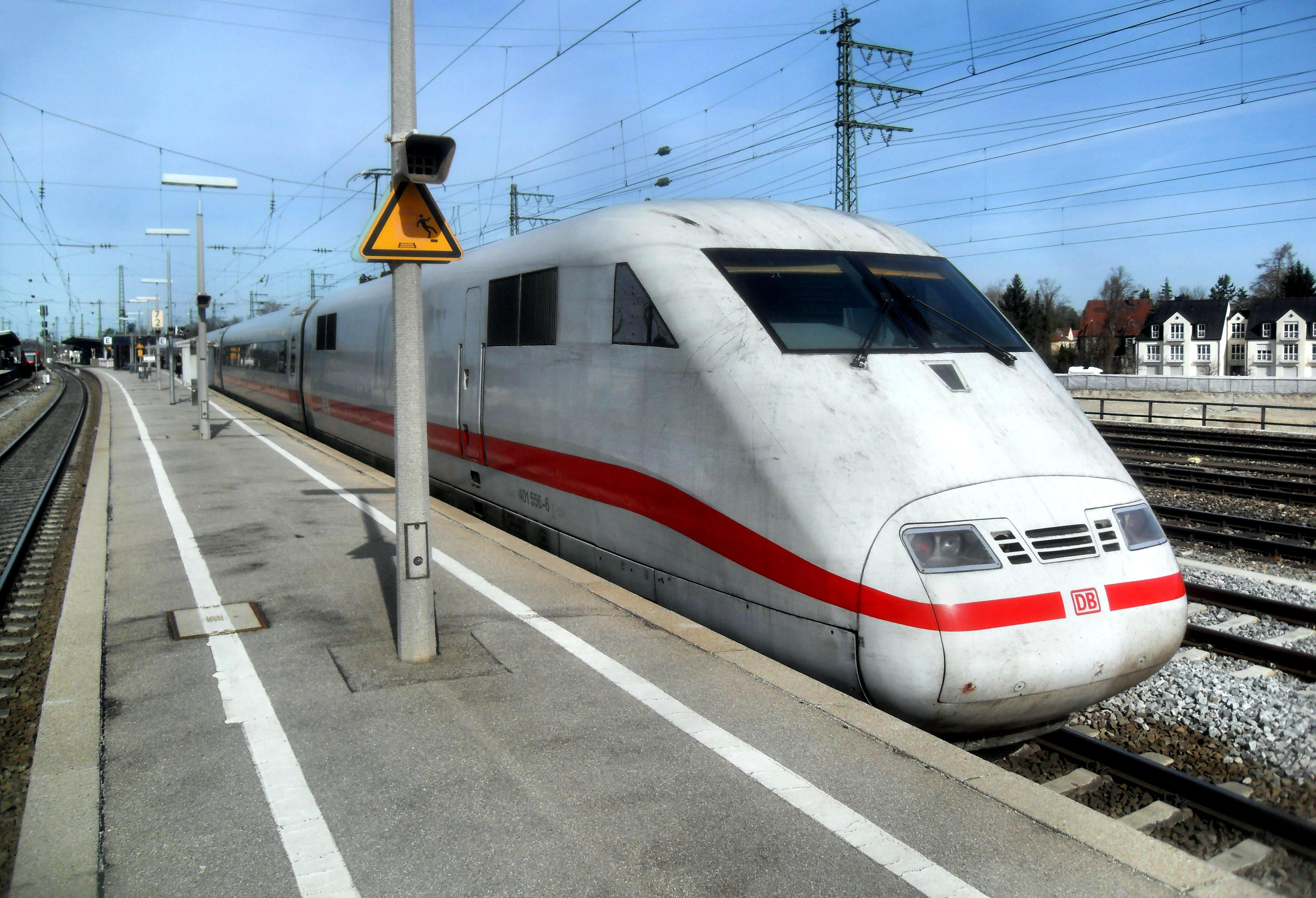
ICE 1 Heppenheim/Bergstraße in München-Pasing station running towards Frankfurt

South of the railway tracks is the station building of 1873, which is still used today and contains administrative offices of Deutsche Bahn, a travel centre, a ServicePoint and a fast food restaurant. To its north it is adjoined by a flat, hall-like building, the so-called Würmtaldächer; its ceiling is supported by cast-iron bars of the original platform hall and houses the ticket office, the newsagent and other catering establishments. From here an inclined ramp leads to a tunnel under the tracks from which the platforms can be reached. Since the commissioning of the electronic signal box on 16 August 2011, the tracks are numbered from south to north, starting at track 2, until then, the numbers of all tracks were one less. The central platforms of tracks 3 to 10 and the side platform of track 2 are accessible by stairs from the main tunnel; there are also lifts on tracks 5/6, 7/8 and 9/10. After passing under tracks without platforms, the tunnel connects on the north side of the station with a small staircase to August-Exter-Straße, where there is a taxi rank and bus stops and the Pasinger Fabrik cultural centre is adjacent. South of the station building is the station forecourt (Bahnhofsvorplatz) with a taxi rank, bus stops and short-term parking. Currently, tram line 19 is being extended from Pasing Marienplatz to Pasing station. There are bicycle stands to the west between the entrance building and sidings. An operations tunnel runs under the tracks from the parking area. Disabled people can use this tunnel, which is only accessible from the south, to reach the platforms by lifts. East of the entrance building is the first Pasing station building, called the Bürklein station. Another tunnel runs under the tracks from here, which is usable by pedestrians and cyclists. This was equipped with stairs to tracks 3–10 in 2009 as part of the restructuring of the regional and mainline platforms.

In the immediate vicinity of the station two streets pass (Offenbachstraße to the east, Lortzingstraße/Alte Allee/Pippinger Straße to the west) under the tracks, connecting the Pasing Villenkolonien (“villa colonies”, wealthy suburbs) and the other districts lying north of the railway with central Pasing, south Pasing and the Landsbergerstraße/Bodenseestraße (B 2), which runs parallel with railway to central Munich in an east–west direction. Between the station and the western underpass, the rail tracks cross the Pasing–Nymphenburg canal and the Würm river, which has a pedestrian and bicycle path (Hermann-HesseWeg) running along its landscaped shore.

The platform tracks in regular operation are as follows: track 2 at the south of the station is used for trains on S-Bahn line S 20 to and from Deisenhofen. Track 3 and 4 are used by regional trains to and from Tutzing and Buchloe. Track 5 and 6 are reserved for S-Bahn services running into the city and tracks 7 and 8 for S-Bahn services running out of the city. Platform 9 and 10 is used by regional and long-distance trains on the line to Augsburg. By the use of appropriate crossovers in the stations tracks, individual platforms can be used very flexibly in case of malfunctions.

The lengths of the platforms are as follows:

- Platform 0 (track 2): 221 m
- Platform I (tracks 3 and 4): 280 m
- Platform II (tracks 5 and 6): 210 m
- Platform III (tracks 7 and 8): 210 m
- Platform IV (tracks 9 and 10): 410 m

The platform edges of all the platforms previously had a height of 85 cm and therefore were not built to a normal German standard. Modification to the standard S-Bahn height of 96 cm for tracks 5-8 and to the standard long-distance/regional height of 76 cm for tracks 2–4 and 9 and 10 has begun.

All platforms are fitted with LCD screens, indicating the next services. On the southern and northern end of the underpass and on the stairways to the platforms there are also screens that can display the destination and departure times for up to seven trains and information about service disruptions.

=== Rail connections ===
The lines from Munich Central Station separate at Pasing and run to the west and south-west. All lines are fully electrified and duplicated and the lines to Starnberg and Lochhausen have four tracks. The following timetable routes pass through the station or start here:

- Munich–Augsburg Central Station–Ulm Central Station line (Munich–Augsburg railway, KBS 980 and 999.4)
- Munich–Buchloe–Kempten Central Station–Immenstadt–Lindau (Munich–Buchloe railway, KBS 970 and 999.8)
- Munich–Garmisch-Partenkirchen railway and Mittenwald Railway (KBS 960 and 999.6)
- München-Pasing–München-Solln–Deisenhofen (Sendling link and Munich–Holzkirchen railway, KBS 999.20)
- S-Bahn trunk line Pasing–Hauptbahnhof-Munich East

==== Long distance services ====
In the 2026 timetable, the following long distance services stop at the station:

Line	Route		Frequency
ICE 11	Berlin Gesundbrunnen – Berlin – Leipzig – Erfurt – Fulda – Frankfurt – Mannheim – Stuttgart – Ulm – Augsburg – München-Pasing – Munich		Every 2 hours
ICE 18	Hamburg-Altona – Hamburg – Berlin – Halle – Erfurt – Nuremberg – Augsburg – München-Pasing – Munich		Every 2 hours
ICE 24	Hamburg-Altona – Hamburg – Hannover – Göttingen – Kassel-Wilhelmshöhe – Würzburg – Donauwörth – Augsburg – München-Pasing – Munich –	Rosenheim – Wörgl – Schwarzach-St. Veit	Some trains
ICE 24	Hamburg-Altona – Hamburg – Hannover – Göttingen – Kassel-Wilhelmshöhe – Würzburg – Donauwörth – Augsburg – München-Pasing – Munich –	– Innsbruck	Some trains
ICE 25	Hamburg-Altona – Hamburg – Hannover – Göttingen – Kassel-Wilhelmshöhe – Fulda – Würzburg – (Nuremberg –) Augsburg – München-Pasing – Munich		Hourly
ICE 42	(Hamburg-Altona –) Hamburg – Bremen – Münster – Dortmund – Wuppertal – Cologne – Siegburg/Bonn – Frankfurt Airport – Mannheim – Stuttgart – Ulm – Augsburg – München-Pasing – Munich		Every 2 hours
ICE 60	(Basel Bad – Freiburg – Offenburg – Baden-Baden –) Karlsruhe – Bruchsal –	Stuttgart – Ulm – Augsburg – Munich-Pasing – Munich	Every 2 hours
ICE 60	Saarbrücken – Homburg – Kaiserslautern – Neustadt –	Stuttgart – Ulm – Augsburg – Munich-Pasing – Munich	One train pair

Most trains run non-stop from Pasing to Munich Hauptbahnhof, only a few services run through the Landsberger Straße junction and the South Ring directly to München Ost station, without stopping at Munich Hauptbahnhof.

==== Regional services ====
In Pasing numerous Regional-Express and Regionalbahn services regularly offer connections to Mittenwald, Innsbruck, Garmisch-Partenkirchen, Weilheim, Memmingen, Kempten, Oberstdorf, Lindau and Augsburg. Also some trains, especially in the peak hours, stop at the end points of the S-Bahn lines and at selected other busy commuter stations (Fürstenfeldbruck/S4 and Starnberg/S6) and give rapid connections to the city of Munich. In the 2026 timetable, the following regional services stop at the station:

Train class	Route	Frequency
RE 9	Munich – München-Pasing – Augsburg – Ulm	Hourly
RE 61 RE 62	Werdenfelsbahn: Munich – München-Pasing – Tutzing – Weilheim – Murnau – Garmisch-Partenkirchen – Mittenwald / Lermoos	Some trains
RE 70 / RE 76	Munich – Munich-Pasing – Kaufering – Buchloe – Kaufbeuren – Kempten – Immenstadt – Lindau-Reutin / Oberstdorf	Every 2 hours
RE 72	Munich – Munich-Pasing – Geltendorf – Kaufering – Buchloe – Türkheim – Mindelheim – Memmingen	Every 2 hours
RB 74	Munich – Munich-Pasing – Fürstenfeldbruck – Geltendorf – Kaufering – Buchloe	Hourly
RE 96	Munich – Munich-Pasing – Kaufering – Buchloe – Memmingen – Kißlegg – Lindau-Insel – Lindau-Reutin	Every 2 hours
RB 6 / RB 60	Werdenfelsbahn: Munich – München-Pasing – Tutzing – Weilheim – Murnau – Garmisch-Partenkirchen (– Mittenwald – Seefeld – Innsbruck / – Reutte in Tirol – Pfronten-Steinach)	Hourly
RB 65/ RB 66	Werdenfelsbahn: Munich – München-Pasing – Tutzing – Weilheim / Kochel	Hourly
RB 68	Munich – Munich-Pasing – Kaufering – Buchloe – Kaufbeuren – Füssen	3 train pairs
RB 86/ RB 87	Munich – München-Pasing – Mering – Augsburg – (Dinkelscherben) / Donauwörth (– Nördlingen – Aalen)	Hourly

==== S-Bahn ====
Munich S-Bahn lines, S3 Holzkirchen-Mammendorf, S4 (Ebersberg-Geltendorf), S6 Munich East-Tutzing, S8 Munich Airport-Herrsching and S20 (Pasing-Deisenhofen) call at the station.

Four of these five S-Bahn lines are bundled on the so-called S-Bahn trunk line through the centre of Munich, giving the S-Bahn a very high frequency of trains between Munich East and Pasing. During peak hour lines S 3 and S 8 operate every 10 minutes and lines S 4 and S 6 operate every 20 minutes, producing 18 services an hour to the city centre, and there are also some regional services that can also be used with the tickets of the Münchner Verkehrs- und Tarifverbund (Munich Transport and Tariff Association) to the Hauptbahnhof.

Pasing is also the terminus of services on S-Bahn line S 20, which runs non-stop through Laim on the so-called Sendlinger Spange (Sendling link) to connect to the south on the route of line S 7 and from Solln over the Großhesselohe Bridge over the Isar to Deisenhofen. It is one of only three S-Bahn lines that does not serve the central section: (Laim–) Donnersbergerbrücke–Hauptbahnhof–Marienplatz–East Munich.

During peak hour, there are also additional S-Bahn trains running from outer areas that run without stopping from Pasing to the Hauptbahnhof, where they end, or continue from Pasing as a service of line S 20.

==== Tram and bus ====
Apart from its numerous rail connections, Pasing station is a major inner-city transport hub, due to Pasing's historical development as an originally separate town. Tram line 19 terminates in front of the station, having been extended from Pasinger Marienplatz in December 2013. The station is also served during the day by a total of six inner-city bus routes, including two very frequent Metrobus routes, which stop at the south or the north sides of the station (south: lines 56, 57, 157, 160, 161, 162; north: 160).

At night, central Munich is accessible hourly by night tram N19 from Pasing. On weekends this runs every half-hour and is complemented by two night bus routes to Neuaubing (N47) and Aubing Gröbenzell, Puchheim and Germering (N80/N81).

Moreover, Pasing is the end of the regional bus route 732 to Odelzhausen.

Pasing station is used daily by a total about 21,000 bus passengers (arriving, departing or transferring). In addition about 4,900 passengers come by tram to Pasing Marienplatz.

== Future extension plans ==
An extension of the Munich U-Bahn from Laimer Platz to Pasing station has been considered, but is unlikely to be carried out for some years.

== Sources ==
- Renate Mayer-Zaky, Reinhard Bauer (1996). Pasing. Stadt in der Stadt. Das Stadtteilbuch (in German). Munich: Bavarica-Verlag Dr. Reinhard Bauer. ISBN 3-923395-02-7.
- Peter Lisson, ed. (1991). Drehscheibe des Südens. Eisenbahnknoten München (in German). Darmstadt: Hestra-Verlag. ISBN 3-7771-0236-9.
