= Patrick Janik =

German politician

Mayor of Starnberg
- Incumbent
- Assumed office 1 May 2020
- Deputy: Angelika Kammerl
- Preceded by: Eva John

Personal details
- Born: 26 March 1976 (age 50) Starnberg, West Germany
- Party: Independent

Patrick Janik (born 26 March 1976) is a German independent politician. He has been mayor of the city of Starnberg since May 2020 after winning an absolute majority of 51.7% in the first ballot of the 2020 local Bavarian election, beating predecessor Eva John along with other candidates.

== Biography ==
Janik completed his law degree at LMU Munich.
