= Tutzing station =

Railway station in Germany

Tutzing
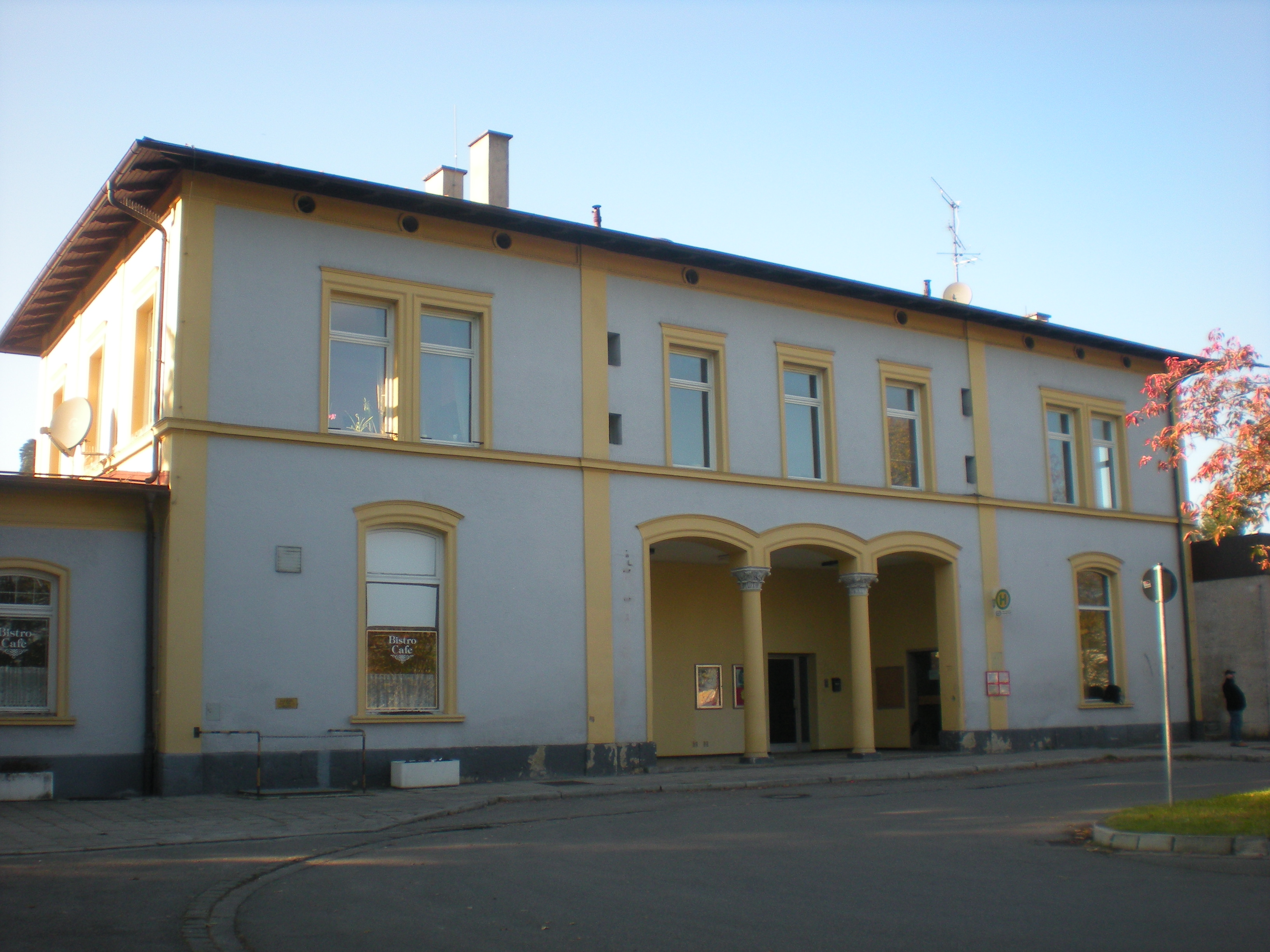
- Old station building

General information
- Location: Bahnhofstr. 26, Tutzing, Bavaria; Germany
- Coordinates: 47°54′25″N 11°16′23″E
- Owner: Deutsche Bahn
- Operator: DB Netz; DB Station&Service
- Lines: Munich–Garmisch-Partenkirchen railway (km 39.6); Tutzing–Kochel (km 0.0)
- Platforms: 3
- Connections: 937, 948, 958, 977, 978, 979

Construction
- Accessible: yes

Other information
- Station code: 6294
- DS100 code: MTZ
- IBNR: 8005927
- Category: 4
- Fare zone: : 4 and 5
- Website: www.bahnhof.de; stationsdatenbank.de

History
- Opened: 1 July 1865; 161 years ago
- Electrified: 23 February 1925; 101 years ago

Services
Preceding station	DB Fernverkehr	Following station
Weilheim (Oberbay) towards Saarbrücken Hbf	ICE 60	München Hbf towards Garmisch-Partenkirchen
Preceding station	DB Regio Bayern	Following station
Weilheim (Oberbay) towards Innsbruck Hbf	RB 6	Munich-Pasing towards München Hbf
Weilheim (Oberbay) towards Pfronten-Steinach	RB 60	Munich-Pasing towards München Hbf
Weilheim (Oberbay) Terminus	RB 65	Starnberg towards München Hbf
Bernried towards Kochel	RB 66	Starnberg towards München Hbf
Preceding station	Munich S-Bahn	Following station
Terminus	S6	Feldafing towards Ebersberg
Location

Tutzing station is currently the only station of the Bavarian town of Tutzing and a station on the Munich S-Bahn. It is classified by Deutsche Bahn as a category 4 station and has three platform tracks. It is served daily by about 130 trains operated by Deutsche Bahn, including 50 S-Bahn trains. Tutzing station is located on the Munich–Garmisch-Partenkirchen railway and is the beginning of the Kochelsee Railway to Kochel.

Previously, there was another station in Tutzing at Diemendorf on the Munich–Garmisch-Partenkirchen line, which was closed for passenger traffic in 1984.

== Location ==
The station is located west of the town centre of Tutzing. The station building is located east of the railway tracks on Bahnhofstraße (station street), which links the station to the town centre, and it has the address of Bahnhofstraße 26. Beringerweg runs west of the line. Heinrich-Vogl-Straße passes through an underpass under the tracks in the northern part of the station precinct.

Tutzing station is a rail junction where the Kochelsee Railway branches off the Munich–Garmisch-Partenkirchen line. The line from Munich to Garmisch-Partenkirchen (VzG 5504) is an electrified main line railway, used by regional services and on weekends by some Intercity-Expresses. It is double-track between Munich and Tutzing and it is also served by the S-Bahn, while it is single track south of Tutzing. The Kochelsee Railway from Tutzing via Penzberg to Kochel (VzG 5453) is an electrified single-track main line and is served only by regional traffic.

The following timetable routes meet in Tutzing:

- KBS 960: Munich–Tutzing–Weilheim–Garmisch-Mittenwald–Innsbruck
- KBS 961: Munich–Tutzing–Penzberg–Kochel
- KBS 999.6: Tutzing–Starnberg–Munich Hauptbahnhof–Munich-East

== History ==
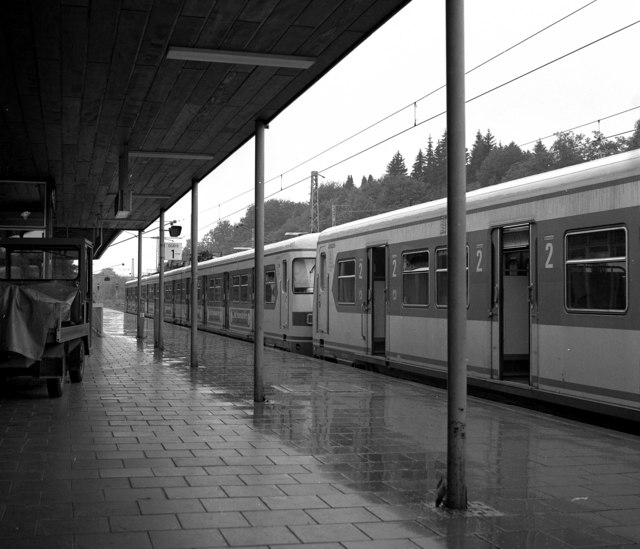
S-Bahn train of class 420 on platform 1

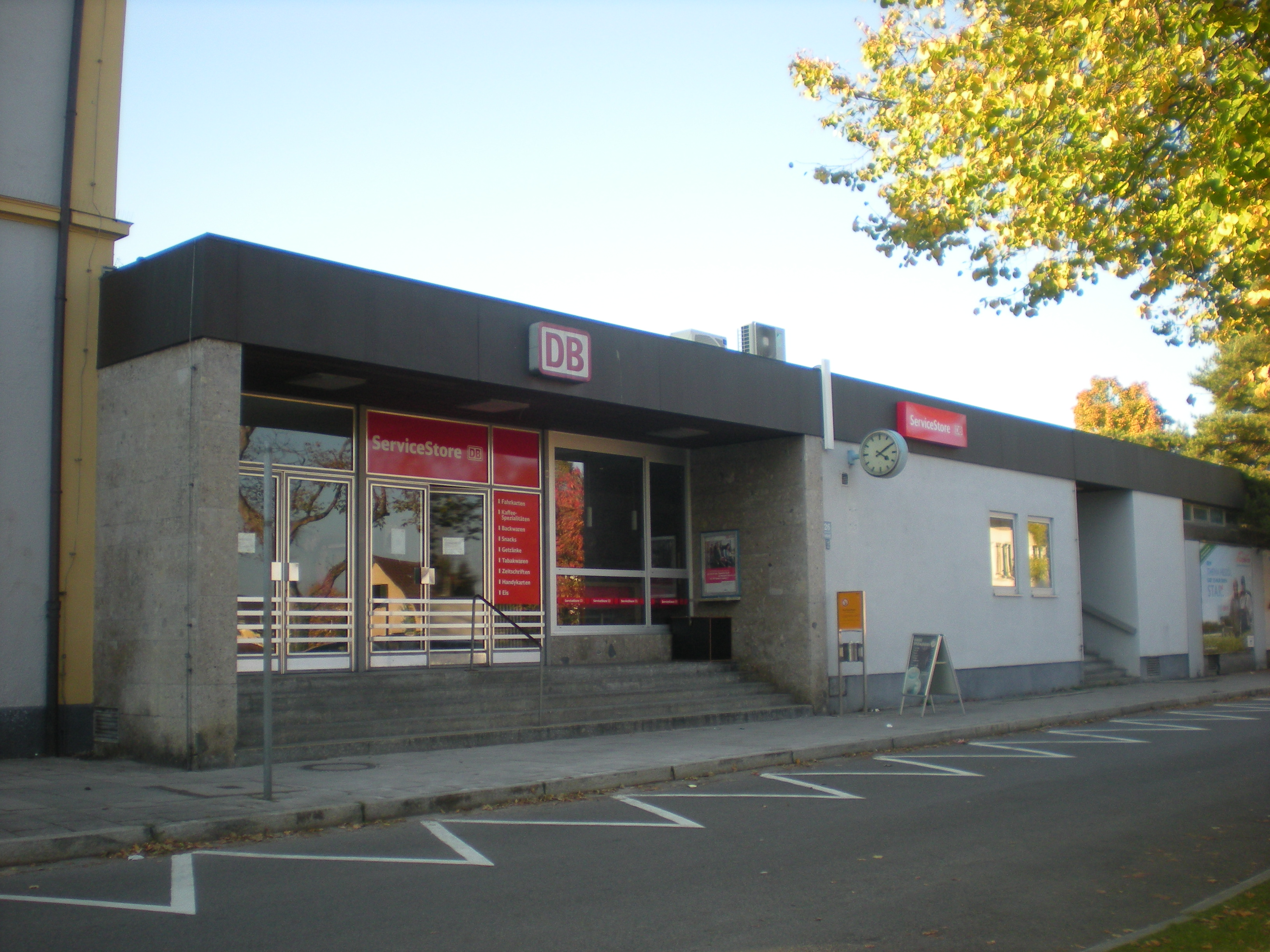
New station building

The line from Munich to Starnberg was opened on 28 November 1854.

Tutzing station was opened on 1 July 1865 along with the Starnberg–Tutzing line. On 1 February 1866, the line was extended beyond Weilheim to Unterpeißenberg. On 16 October 1865, the Kochelsee Railway was opened from Tutzing to Penzberg. The line from Munich extended from Weilheim to Murnau as a Vizinalbahn (local railway) on 15 May 1879 and this was followed by the opening of the extension to Garmisch-Partenkirchen by the private railway company, Lokalbahn AG, on 25 July 1889. The Kochelsee Railway was extended from Penzberg to Kochel am See on 23 May 1898. Tutzing station was integrated as a terminus in the Munich S-Bahn network on 28 May 1972.

== Infrastructure ==
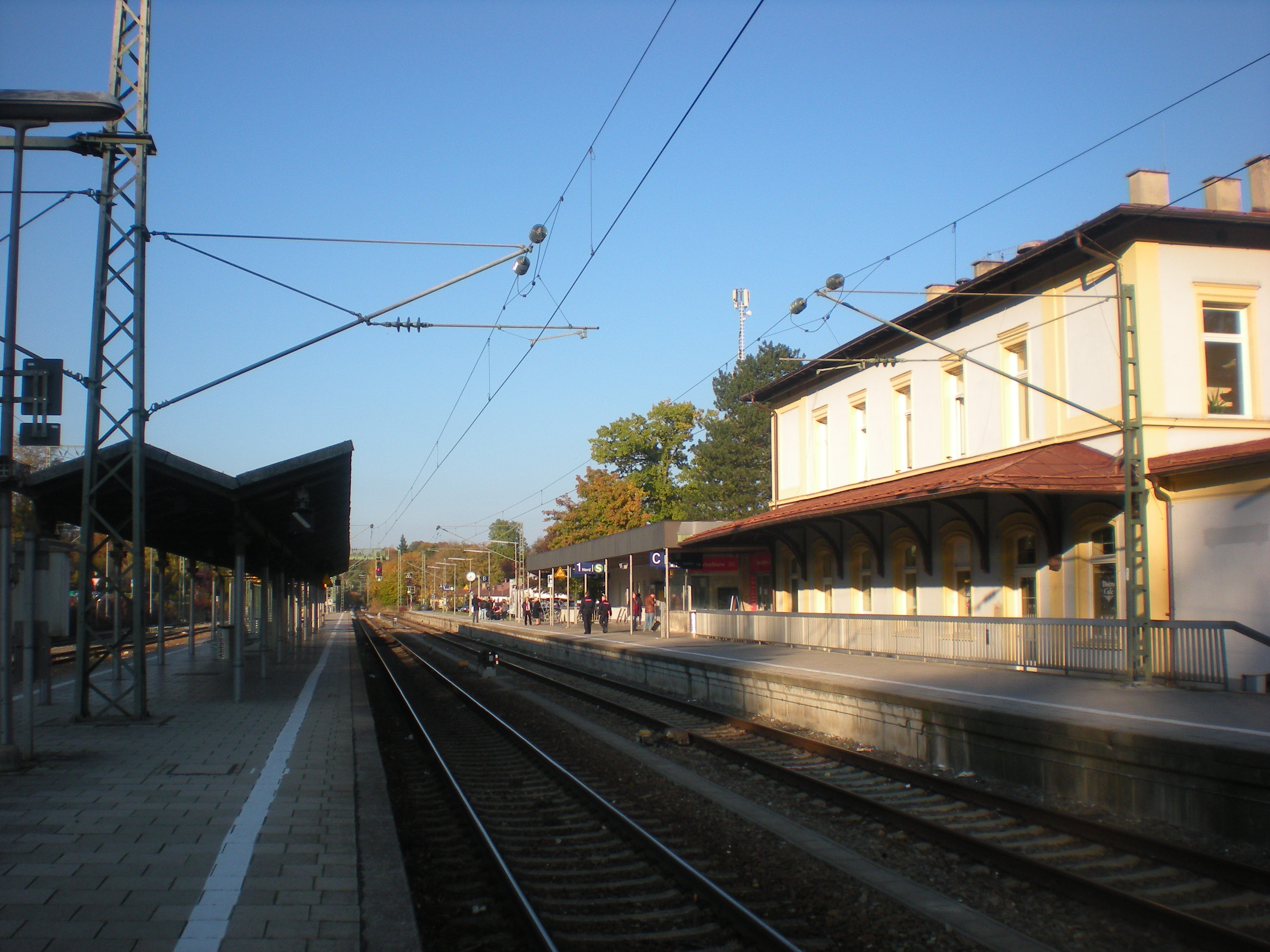
Platforms

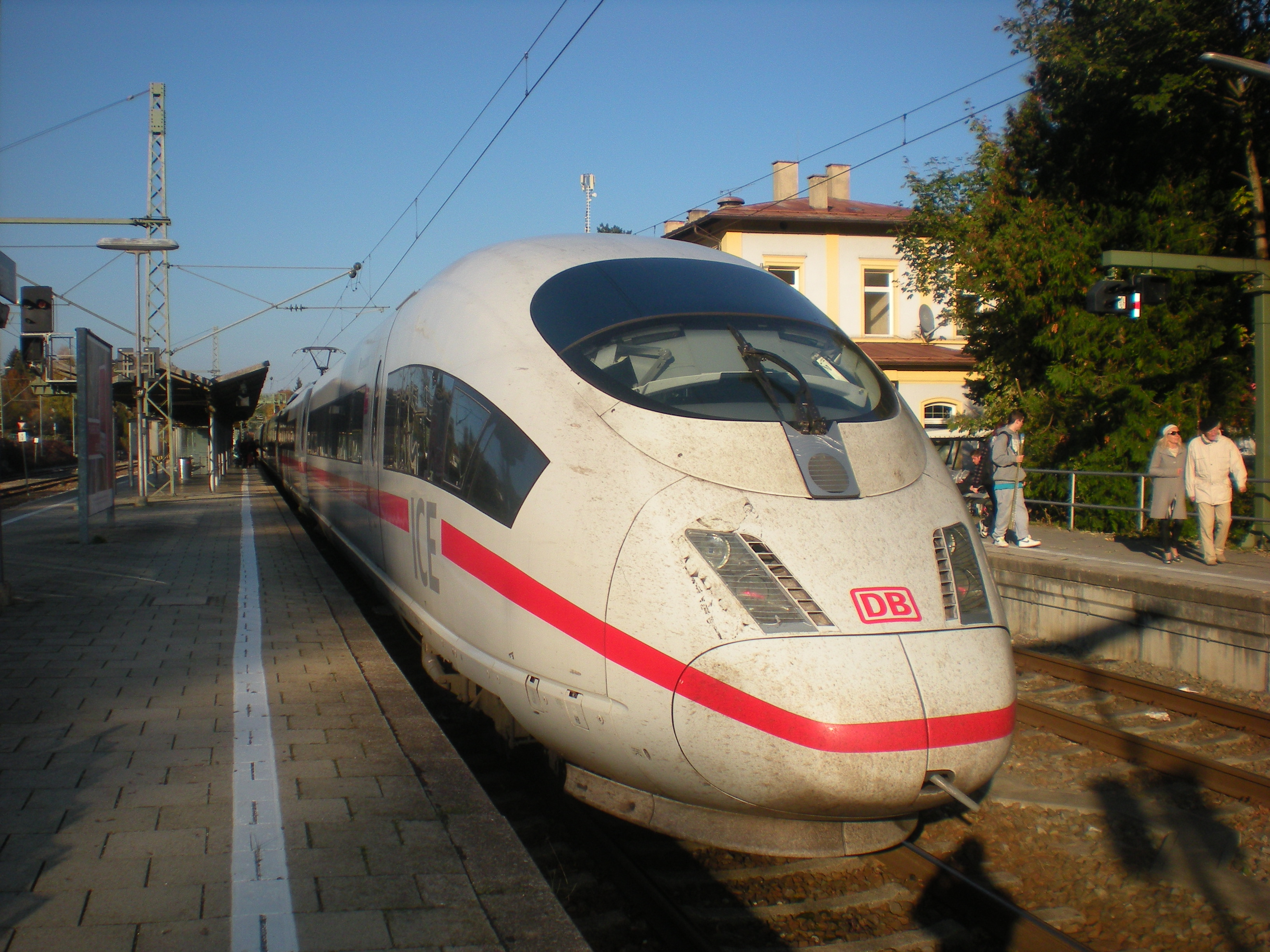
ICE 3 to Dortmund

Tutzing station has three platform tracks. Track 1 is the "home" platform (next to the station building) and tracks 2 and 3 are on a central platform. West of the platforms there are still two sidings without platforms. Both platforms are covered and have digital destination displays. The central platform is connected by a subway to the home platform. The station was upgraded to make it accessible for the disabled between March 2013 and April 2014.

The old station building is no longer used. In the new station building next to it there is a travel centre.

The station is in the area of the Münchner Verkehrs- und Tarifverbund (Munich Transport and Tariff Association, MVV).

=== Platforms ===
Platform lengths and heights are as follows:

Track	Length in m	Height in cm	Use
1	300	76	Trains towards Munich
2	371	Southern part: 76	Regionalbahn trains towards Kochel
2	371	Northern part: 96	S-Bahn trains towards Munich
3	310	76	Trains towards Weilheim and Kochel, ICE trains towards Munich

== Services ==
Since 13 December 2009, Tutzing station has been served by some Intercity-Express services on Friday, Saturday and Sunday. Regional services run at hourly intervals from Munich to Mittenwald, which every two hours continue to Innsbruck. Also Regionalbahn services run every hour from Tutzing to Kochel, some starting in Munich during the peak hour. Tutzing is also the terminus of Munich S-Bahn line S 6, which is operated with class 423 EMUs every 20 minutes. The station is a node for regional trains running to Munich, Mittenwald and Kochel, with trains arriving before the hour and departing just after the hour, so interchanges are available. In the 2026 timetable, the following regional services stop at the station:

Line	Route		Frequency
ICE 60	Saarbrücken – Kaiserslautern – Mannheim – Stuttgart – Ulm – Augsburg – Munich – Munich – Tutzing – Murnau – Garmisch-Partenkirchen		1 train on some Sats and Suns towards Saarbrücken
RB 6	Munich – Tutzing – Weilheim – Murnau – Garmisch-Partenkirchen (train split)	(– Mittenwald – Seefeld (– Innsbruck))	Hourly to Garmisch
RB 60	Munich – Tutzing – Weilheim – Murnau – Garmisch-Partenkirchen (train split)	(– Reutte in Tirol – Pfronten-Steinach)	Hourly to Garmisch
RB 65	Munich – Tutzing (train split)	– Weilheim	Hourly
RB 66	Munich – Tutzing (train split)	– Penzberg – Kochel	Hourly
S6 (Munich)	Ebersberg – Grafing – Munich – Pasing – Gauting – Starnberg – Tutzing		Every 20 mins
