= Pöcking =

- Municipality
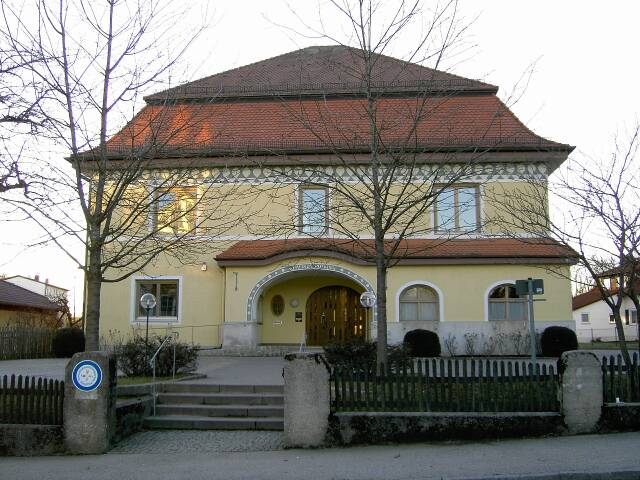
- Town hall

- Coat of arms

- Location of Pöcking within Starnberg district
- Interactive map of Pöcking
- Location within Germany Location within Bavaria
- Coordinates: 47°58′N 11°18′E
- Country: Germany
- State: Bavaria
- Admin. region: Oberbayern
- District: Starnberg

Government
  - Mayor (2020–26): Rainer Schnitzler

Area
  - Total: 20.96 km^{2} (8.09 sq mi)
- Elevation: 672 m (2,205 ft)

Population (2025-12-31)
  - Total: 5,618
  - Density: 268.0/km^{2} (694.2/sq mi)
- Time zone: UTC+01:00 (CET)
  - Summer (DST): UTC+02:00 (CEST)
- Postal codes: 82343
- Dialling codes: 08157 and 08151
- Vehicle registration: STA
- Website: www.poecking.de

Pöcking (German pronunciation: [ˈpœkɪŋ]) is a municipality in the district of Starnberg in Bavaria, Germany. It is best known for being the location of Duchess Elisabeth in Bavaria's childhood summer home, Possenhofen Castle.

== Transport ==
The district has a railway station, Possenhofen, that is served by the Munich S-Bahn.

== Notable people ==
- Duke Maximilian Joseph in Bavaria
- Princess Ludovika of Bavaria
- Empress Elisabeth of Austria
- Archduchess Adelheid of Austria
- Princess Alexandrine of Prussia
- Otto von Habsburg, Crown Prince of Austria-Hungary
- Leni Riefenstahl
