= Starnberg =

- Town
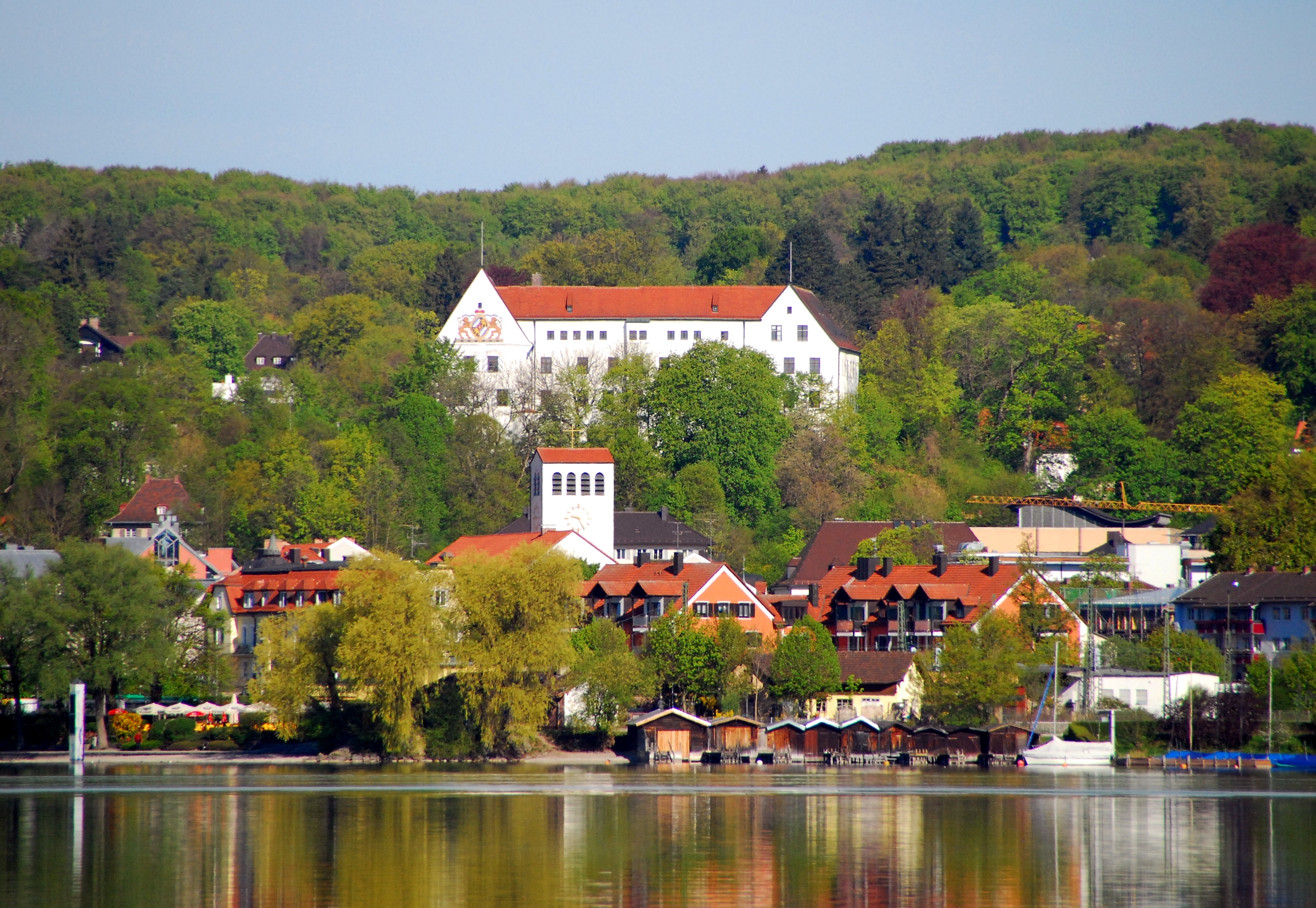
- The town of Starnberg with the castle in the background

- Coat of arms

- Location of Starnberg within Starnberg district
- Interactive map of Starnberg
- Location within Germany Location within Bavaria
- Coordinates: 47°59′50″N 11°20′26″E
- Country: Germany
- State: Bavaria
- Admin. region: Oberbayern
- District: Starnberg

Government
  - Mayor (2020–26): Patrick Janik

Area
  - Total: 61.85 km^{2} (23.88 sq mi)
- Elevation: 588 m (1,929 ft)

Population (2025-12-31)
  - Total: 24,602
  - Density: 397.8/km^{2} (1,030/sq mi)
- Time zone: UTC+01:00 (CET)
  - Summer (DST): UTC+02:00 (CEST)
- Postal codes: 82319
- Dialling codes: 08151
- Vehicle registration: STA
- Website: www.starnberg.de

Starnberg (German pronunciation: [ˈʃtaʁnbɛʁk]) is a town in Bavaria, Germany, approximately 23 kilometres (14 mi) southwest of Munich. It is at the north end of Lake Starnberg, in the heart of the "Five Lakes Country", and serves as capital of the district of Starnberg. Starnberg is the wealthiest town in Germany and is home to many billionaires, actors, and artists.

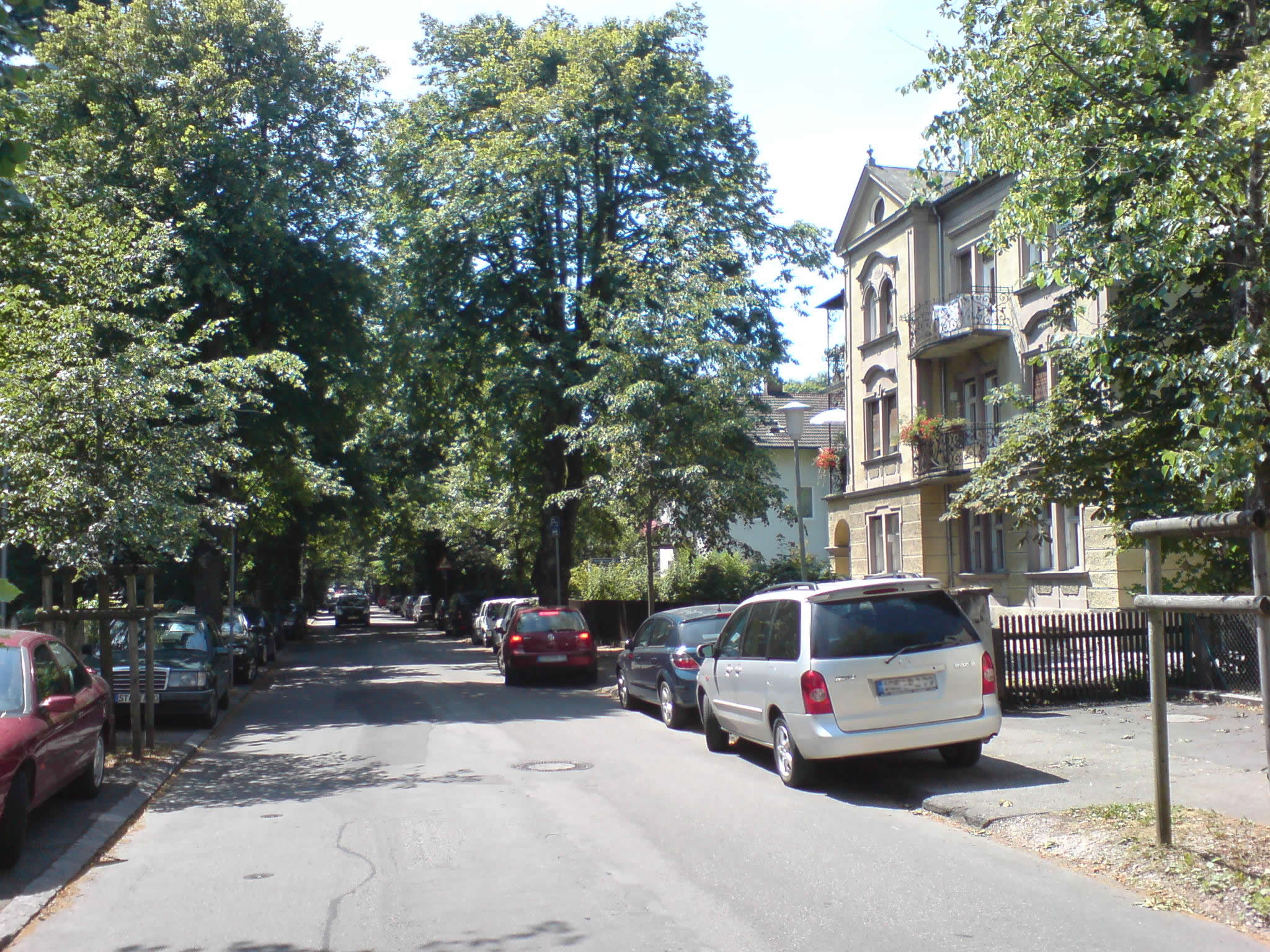
Residential area in Starnberg

== History ==
The town was first mentioned in 1226 under the name of Aheim am Würmsee. Würmsee (Lake Würm, after the river of the same name) was the official name of Lake Starnberg until 1962.

The founding of Starnberg Castle is attributed to the Counts of Andechs and dates back to the 11th century. As a defensive structure, the castle is probably older due to its strategic location. Starnberg Castle was first mentioned in documents in 1244. After the death of the last Andechser (1248), the Wittelsbach family, dukes of Bavaria, took over the castle. The dukes then integrated the Starnberg area into their administrative and judicial system. From around 1346, it was the seat of its own court.

In 1541, under Duke Wilhelm IV, the medieval castle was demolished and a residential and defensive building was redesigned in the Renaissance style. Under Duke Albert V, the conversion into a pleasure palace and summer residence began. In 1643, the Swedes stormed the castle during the Thirty Years War and partially destroyed it. Under Elector Ferdinand Maria, the castle was an important summer residence, and from 1663 the magnificent ship Bucentaur, based on the Venetian model of the Doges of Venice, floated on Lake Starnberg.

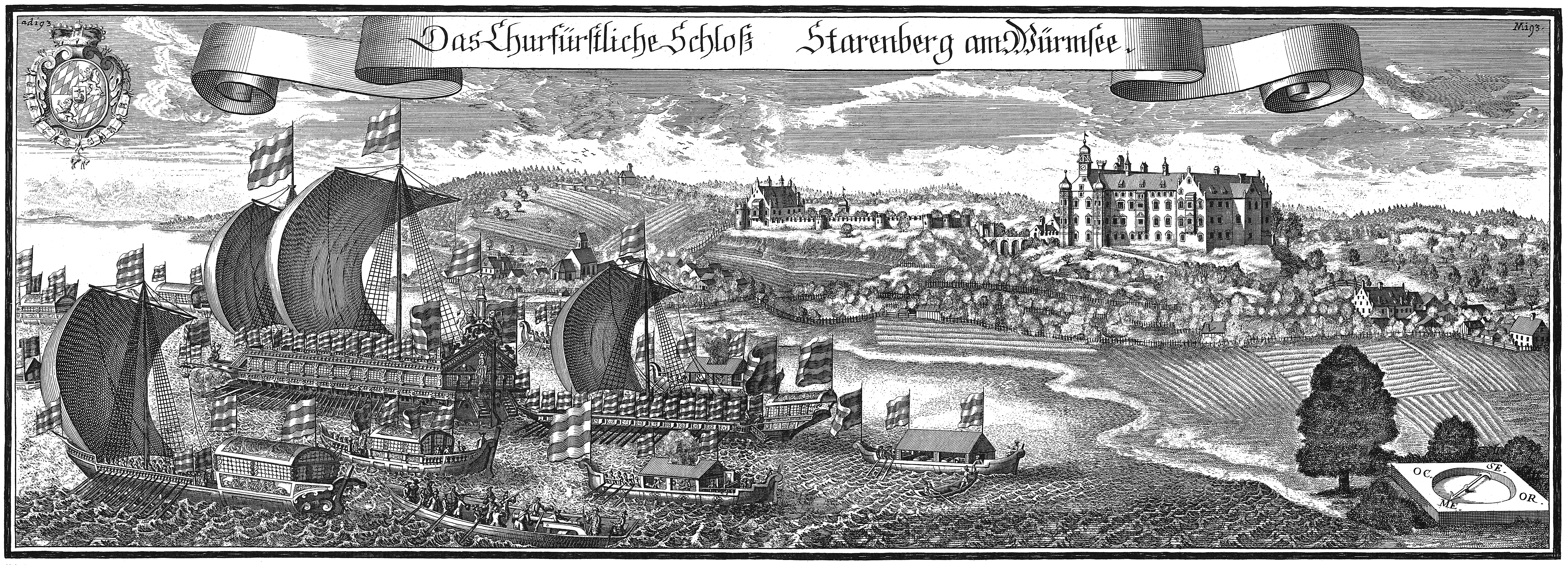
Starnberg Castle and the fleet of magnificent ships, led by the Bucentaurus, a copy of the ship of the Doges of Venice (around 1700)

In 1734, a large part of the now baroque palace was destroyed by fire, and the remaining buildings slowly fell into disrepair. From 1803, the castle was used as an office building for the regional court, the rent office and the forestry office. From 1969 to 1972, the castle was completely gutted and rebuilt, ever since used as a tax office.

At the beginning of the 19th century, wealthy families discovered the beauty of the landscape around Lake Starnberg and had the first villas built on the lakeshore as summer residences. Steam shipping was the real impetus for the village's rapid development in the second half of the 19th century. A railway line has connected Starnberg with Munich since 1854. The opportunity to work in the city and live by the lake led to a real construction boom in the coming years. The city villas and country houses that professors, lawyers, artists and merchants now had built were no longer just intended to serve as summer homes, they were the main residence of the families.

After 1871, the steamer "Maximilian" carried a million passengers in three years. In 1872, the steamship "Ludwig" was put into operation. He was followed by the steamers "Bavaria" (1878), "Wittelsbach" (1886) and Luitpold (1890). The inns that had been built to cater for the excursionists were soon no longer sufficient, as more and more guests not only wanted to go on a country trip, but also wanted to spend their vacation in Starnberg. Entertainment was provided by sailing regattas, promenade concerts and, above all, a luxuriously equipped bathing establishment. By the turn of the century, in addition to guesthouses, large, elegant hotels had been built, which gave the place the flair of a seaside resort due to their appearance and the high-ranking public who stayed there. In 1890, sewerage began and in 1897 the community's first power station went into operation - attracting more people willing to build, whose villas and parks on the surrounding hills completely changed the landscape. In 1900, the once 65 properties had become 384 in which 4,531 people lived.

Since an actual city center was never able to develop due to the short and intensive history of development from a small village to a city (1912), the demolition of many old buildings that became necessary and the construction of modern buildings changed the face of Starnberg particularly lastingly. The district town of Starnberg has developed from a tourist resort into a diversified business location and the cultural center of the surrounding Five Lakes Region. The core city (excluding the incorporated parts of the community) has now reached a population of just over 11,000.

== Incorporated districts ==
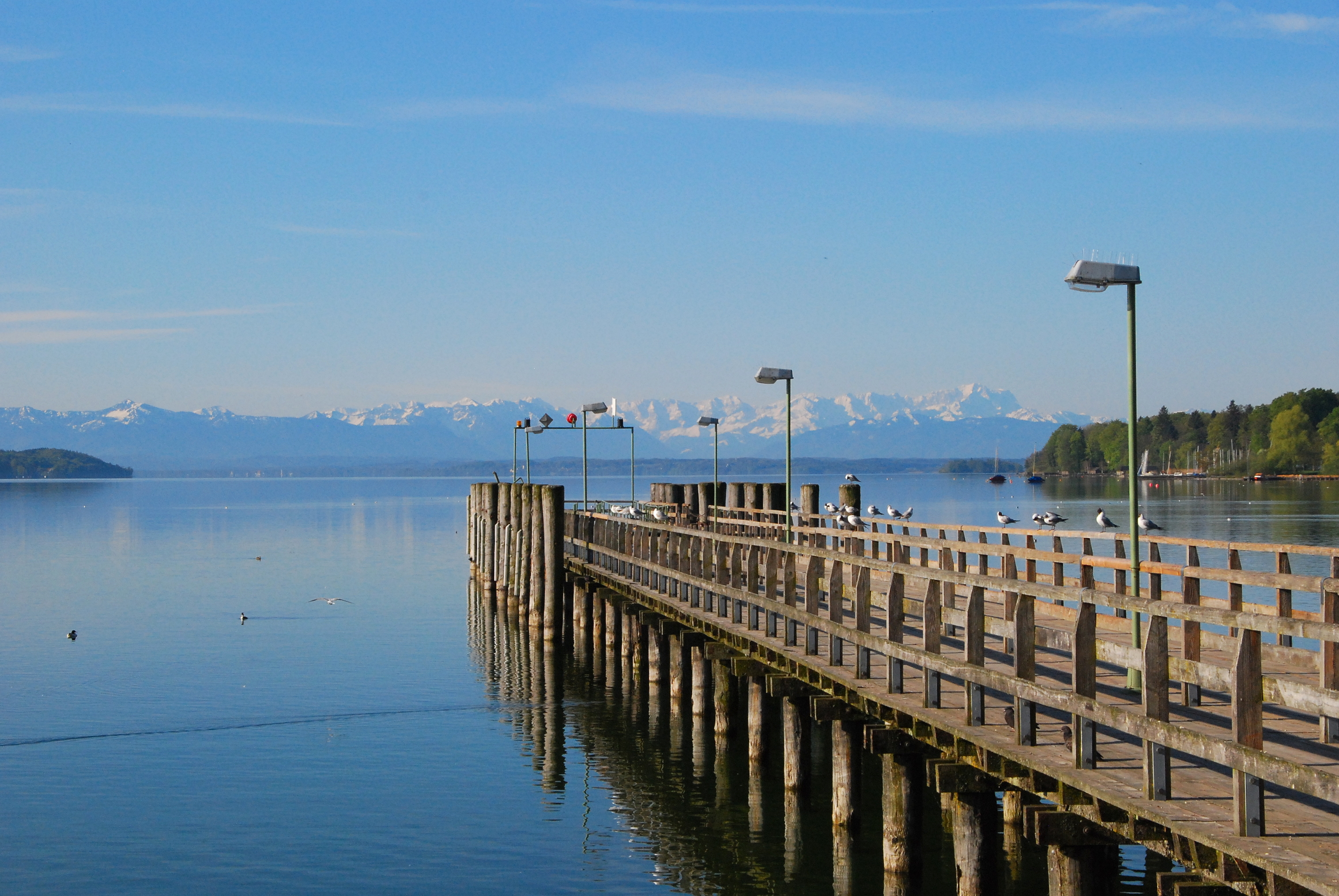
The wooden jetty for steam ships at Starnberg, with a view over the lake to the Wetterstein Mountains

Districts (Ortsteile) are listed with their year of incorporation and area.

- Hadorf (1978, 6.93 km^{2})
- Hanfeld with Mamhofen (1972, 5.58 km^{2})
- Leutstetten with Einbettl, Mühlthal, Oberdill, Petersbrunn and Schwaige (1978, 7.68 km^{2})
- Percha with Buchhof, Heimathshausen and Selcha (1978, 6, 07 km^{2})
- Perchting with Landstetten, Jägersbrunn and Sonnau (1978, 11.36 km^{2})
- Rieden (1803, 1.83 km^{2})
- Söcking (1978, 8.17 km^{2})
- Wangen with Fercha, Schorn, Unterschorn and Wildmoos (1978, 7.49 km^{2})

== Transport ==
The municipality has two railway stations, Starnberg and Starnberg Nord. Both are served by the Munich S-Bahn line S6, which provides frequent trains to and from Munich. In addition, Starnberg is a principal stop for the vessels of the Bayerische Seenschifffahrt or lake fleet.

== Main sights ==
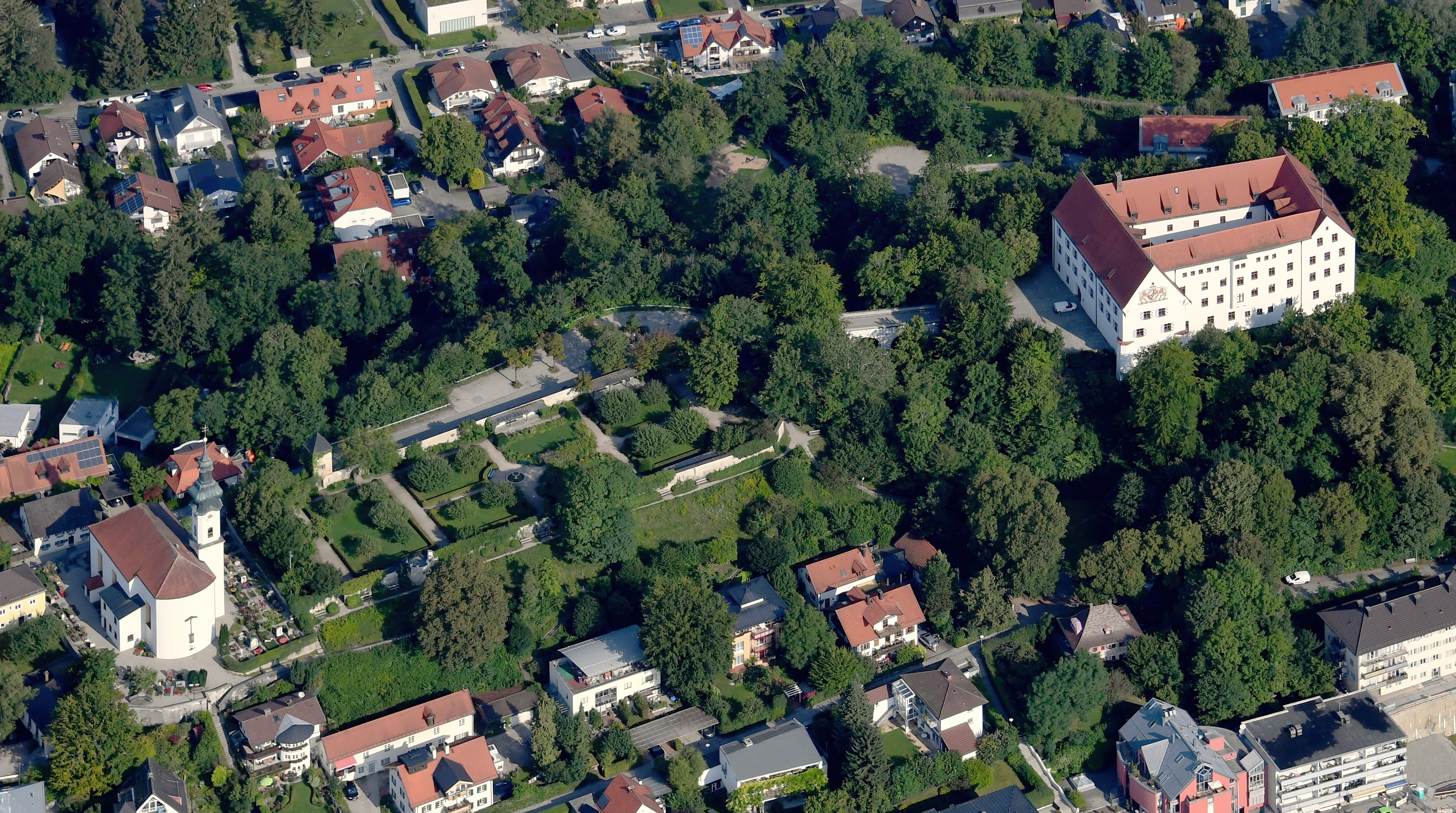
Starnberg Castle and its garden with St. Joseph's Church

- Starnberger Schloss (castle) with the castle garden
- St. Joseph's Church

== Notable people ==
- Lothar-Günther Buchheim (1918–2007), author (Das Boot published in 1973 and source for the epic film and mini-series) and painter; died in Starnberg
- Dietrich Fischer-Dieskau (1925–2012), baritone
- Oskar Maria Graf (1894–1967), the socially conscious writer, was born in Aufkirchen near Starnberg in 1894. He fought for the Bavarian Soviet Republic (or Räterepublik) in Munich in 1919. He fled his homeland in 1938 with his Jewish wife for the U.S.A., when National Socialism gripped Germany. Graf was never fully able to adjust to life in the United States or, more to the point, away from his homeland, Bavaria.
- Jürgen Habermas (1929–2026), philosopher and sociologist who long lived and worked in Starnberg as a director of the Max-Planck-Institut zur Erforschung der Lebensbedingungen der wissenschaftlich-technischen Welt; died in Starnberg
- Johannes Heesters (1903–2011), actor; lived in Starnberg until his death
- King Ludwig II of Bavaria (1845–1886), mysteriously drowned in Lake Starnberg at the small town of Berg nearby, on the evening of 13 June 1886
- Herbert Marcuse (1898–1979), Frankfurt School philosopher, died in Starnberg
- Gustav Meyrink (1868–1932), The Austrian writer was a resident of Starnberg from 1911 until his death in 1932 and is buried in the local cemetery. Among his best remembered works is The Golem, which inspired the 1920 classic German Expressionist film The Golem: How He Came into the World
- Christian Reiher (born 1984), Multiple IMO (International Mathematical Olympiad) gold medalist winner that was born in Starnberg
- Marianne Sägebrecht (born 1945), actress; was born here in Starnberg (Bagdad Café and other films)
- Adrian Sutil (born 1983), Formula One driver; was born in Starnberg
- Maha Vajiralongkorn (born 1952), 10th king of Thailand
- Karl Wolff (1900–1984), SS General; lived in Starnberg after the war
- Karl von Habsburg (born 1961), current head of the House of Habsburg; was born in Starnberg
- Benedict Hollerbach (born 2001), football player for Mainz 05
- Adolf von Baeyer (1835-1917) recipient of the 1905 Nobel prize in Chemistry; lived his later years and died in his Starnberg country house
