= S6 (Munich) =

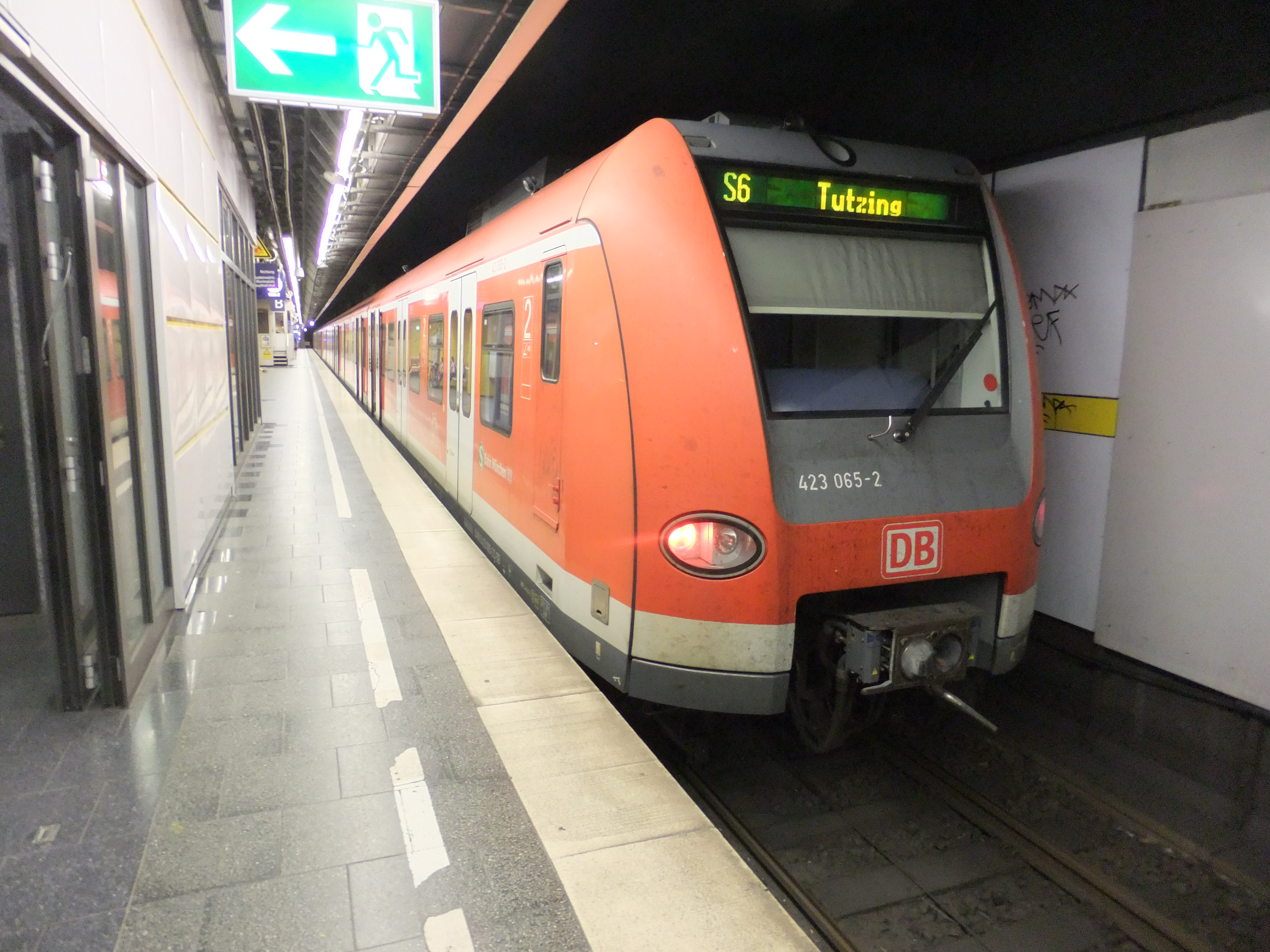

Overview
- Line number: S6
- Locale: Munich, Bavaria, Germany

Service
- System: Munich S-Bahn
- Route number: 999.6
- Operator(s): S-Bahn Munich
- Rolling stock: DBAG Class 423

Technical
- Electrification: 15 kV, 16.7 Hz AC Overhead lines

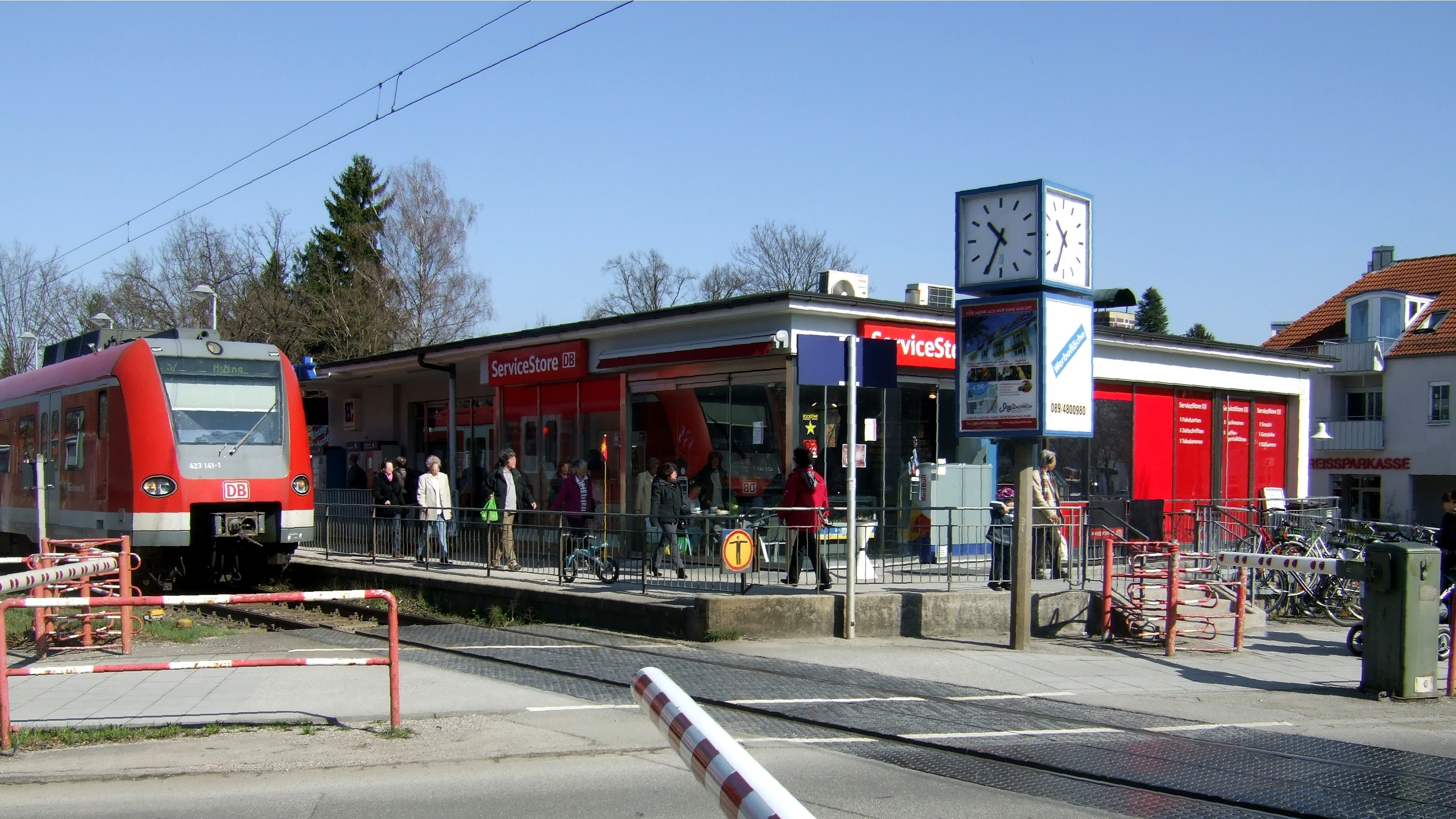
S6 service in Ottobrunn station

Line S6 is a line on the Munich S-Bahn network. It is operated by DB Regio Bayern. It runs from Tutzing station to Zorneding via Starnberg, Pasing, central Munich and Munich East.

The line is operated at 20-minute intervals between Starnberg and Munich East. Two out of three trains an hour continue from Starnberg to Tutzing, so that the gap between trains alternates between 20 and 40 minutes. In the peak hour services are extended to and from Zorneding every 20 minutes. It is operated using class 423 four-car electrical multiple units, usually as two coupled sets. In the evenings and on Sundays they generally run as single sets.

The line runs over lines built at various times:

- from Tutzing to Pasing over the Munich–Garmisch-Partenkirchen railway, in accordance with an agreement of 5 November 1853 between the Royal Bavarian State Railways (German: Königlich Bayerische Staats-Eisenbahnen; K.Bay.Sts.B.) and the architect Ulrich Himbsel and opened on 21 May 1854. Between Munich and Pasing the line was duplicated and shared with the Munich-Augsburg Railway Company. The line was extended to Gauting on 16 July, to Mühlthal on 16 September and to Starnberg on 28 November 1854. On 1 January 1862 the line was purchased by the Bavarian government, which had previously leased and operated it. The continuation of the line from Starnberg, was built and operated by the town of Weilheim under a concession. The line was extended to Tutzing on 1 July 1865. The line was electrified from Tutzing to Starnberg on 16 February 1925 and from Starnberg to Munich on 20 February 1925.
- from Pasing to the approaches to Munich Central Station (Hauptbahnhof) over a section of the S-Bahn trunk line laid parallel to the Munich–Augsburg railway, opened by the Munich–Augsburg Railway Company from Munich to Pasing on 1 September 1839
- the underground section of the S-Bahn trunk line from the approaches to Munich Central Station to Munich East station, opened on 1 May 1971
- from Munich East station to Zorneding on the Munich–Rosenheim railway, opened by the Royal Bavarian State Railways on 15 October 1871 and electrified on 12 April 1927.

S-Bahn services on line S 6 commenced on 28 May 1972, originally running between Tutzing and Erding. The present route has operated since about 2009. The section from Munich East to Zorneding (which is now normally operated by line S 4 services) was formerly operated as line S 5 between Herrsching and Ebersberg.
