= Munich–Garmisch-Partenkirchen railway =

Railway line in Bavaria, Germany

Coordinates: 47.4918°N 11.0970°E

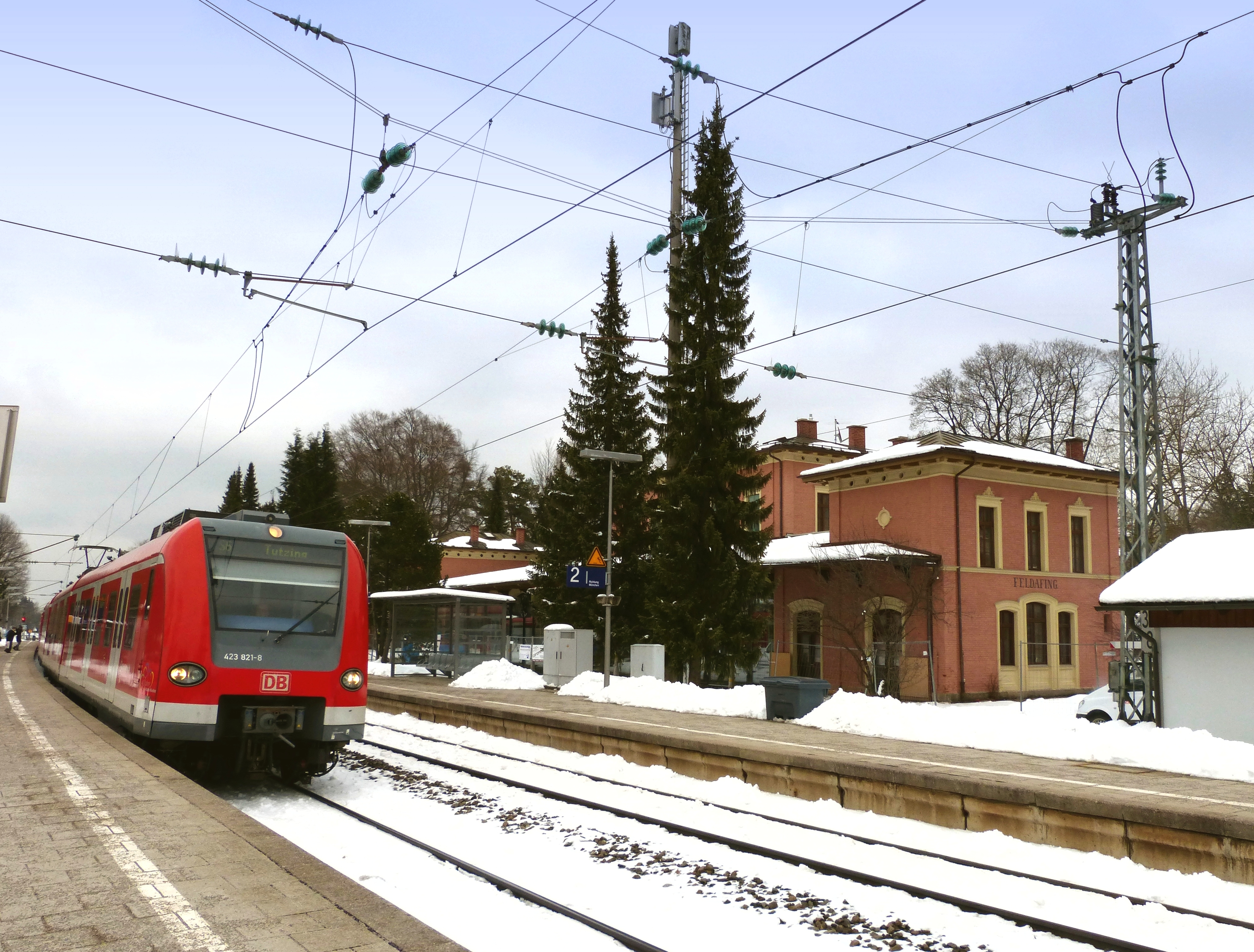
- Munich–Garmisch-Partenkirchen railway

Overview
- Line number: 5504; 5540 (S-Bahn Hauptbahnhof–Gauting)
- Locale: Bavaria, Germany

Service
- Route number: 960 (Munich–Innsbruck); 999.6 (S 6 Munich–Tutzing)

Technical
- Line length: 100.6 km (62.5 mi)
- Number of tracks: 2: München–Tutzing and Murnau–Hechendorf
- Track gauge: 1,435 mm (4 ft 8 1/2 in) standard gauge
- Electrification: 15 kV/16.7 Hz AC overhead catenary
- Operating speed: 140 km/h (87.0 mph) (max)

The Munich–Garmisch-Partenkirchen railway is a single track, electrified main line railway in the southern part of the German state of Bavaria. It runs from Munich via Starnberg and Murnau to Garmisch-Partenkirchen. The first part of it was opened in 1854 and is one of the oldest lines in Germany.

On 3 June 2022 in the Burgrain train derailment, a regional train derailed on a single track curve at Burgrain, north of Garmisch-Partenkirchen station.

== Route ==
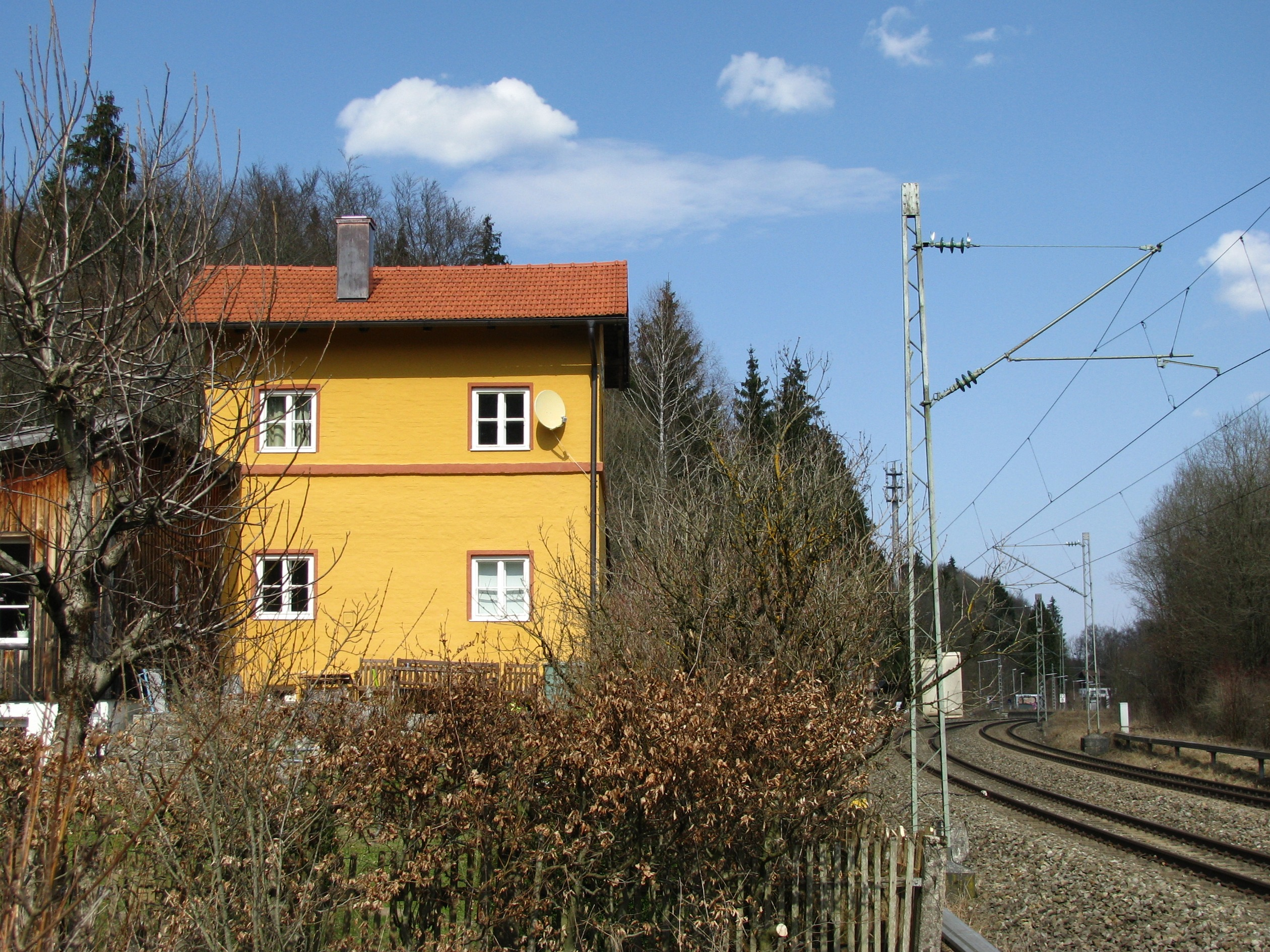
Signal box near Mühlthal

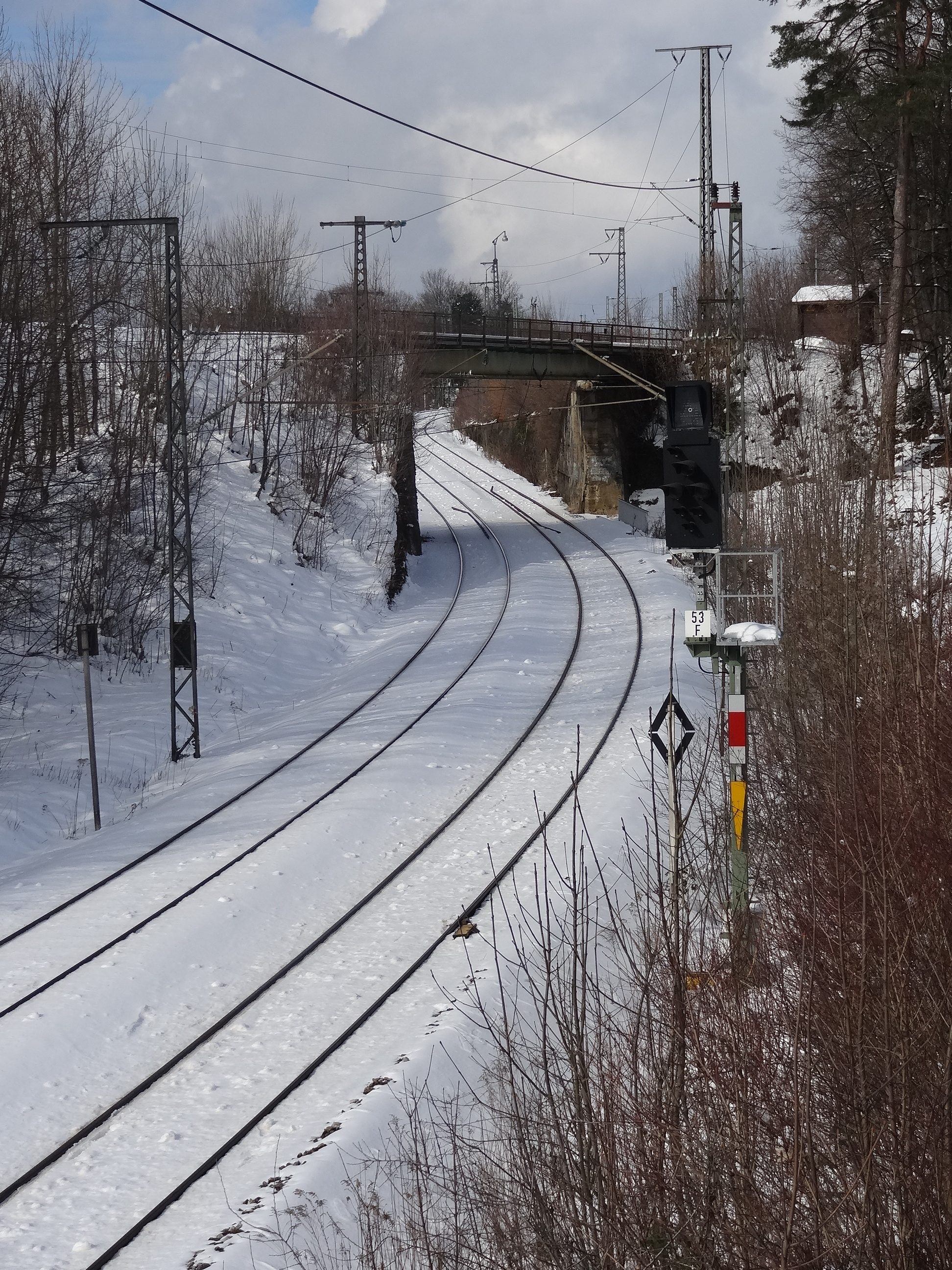
Flying junction near Murnau

The line runs for 7.4 km from the Starnberg wing of Munich Hauptbahnhof to Munich-Pasing station. The route to Tutzing runs parallel to S-Bahn line S6. North and south of Starnberg the line follows the shore of Lake Starnberg, where the Alps can be seen. The S-Bahn line ends in Tutzing. The single-track, electrified Kochelsee line branches off to the southeast to Kochel. South of Tutzing the line leaves the shore. At Weilheim, the Ammersee line joins from the northwest and the Weilheim–Peißenberg line diverges to the southwest. The line continues to the region around Lake Staffel and Murnau, where it runs under the overpass of the Ammergau line to Oberammergau. At Ohlstadt the line enters the tourism-dominated Alpine region. The end of the line is reached at Garmisch-Partenkirchen station, where the line continues as the Mittenwald line with views of Karwendel and Wetterstein. Alternatively, the Außerfern line and Zugspitz line connect with other alpine destinations.

== History ==
=== Construction to Starnberg ===
The line from the Starnberg Station in Munich via Pasing to Planegg was built in accordance with an agreement of 5 November 1853 between the Royal Bavarian State Railways (German: Königlich Bayerische Staats-Eisenbahnen; K.Bay.Sts.B.) and the architect Ulrich Himbsel and opened on 21 May 1854. Between Munich and Pasing the line was duplicated and shared with the Munich-Augsburg Railway Company. The line was extended to Gauting on 16 July, to Mühlthal on 16 September and to Starnberg on 28 November 1854. On 1 January 1862 the line was purchased by the Bavarian government, which had previously leased and operated it.

=== Munich–Peißenberg Railway ===
The continuation of the line from Starnberg, was built and operated by the town of Weilheim under a concession. The line was extended to Tutzing on 1 July 1865 and via Weilheim to Unterpeißenberg (on the modern Weilheim–Peißenberg line) on 1 February 1866. It was later extended to Schongau. The line was used for the transport of lignite mined in Peißenberg and Penzberg.

=== Weilheim–Murnau local railway ===
On 8 May 1874 the Murnau Reichstag deputy Emmeran Kottmüller founded a railway committee with the aim of building a Vizinalbahn (literally a "local railway", a railway built by a local community with a state subsidy under a Bavarian law of 1869) from Weilheim to Murnau. The business community of Murnau and the surrounding communities raised enough capital to bring the proposal before the Bavarian parliament in the autumn of 1875 and it was approved on 10 July 1876. The line was opened on 15 May 1879. In 1898 the line was upgraded to allow a maximum speed of 30 km/h.

In 1898, the Ammersee line was opened connecting with the Munich–Garmisch-Partenkirchen line in Weilheim.

=== Murnau–Garmisch-Partenkirchen ===
The line was continued to the south by a private railway company, Lokalbahn AG (LAG), which was granted a concession by the then still independent town of Partenkirchen on 23 September 1888 to build and operate a local railway from Murnau. The 25.7 km-long single-track line was opened after a construction period of only 9.5 months on 25 July 1889. The station was located in Partenkirchen from the beginning and was renamed Garmisch-Partenkirchen, when the two municipalities were merged in 1935. Through coaches operated from the beginning from Munich and in 1900 the first Munich-Garmisch–Partenkirchen express was introduced. At the turn of the 20th century plans to build a railway line between Garmisch-Partenkirchen and Innsbruck were advanced and on 22 November 1904 a treaty was signed by Bavaria and Austria. On the Bavarian side construction and operations would be performed by the K.Bay.Sts.B. The LAG was not willing to pay for the necessary upgrade of its route from Murnau to Garmisch-Partenkirchen and it entered into negotiations with the K.Bay.Sts.B. This ended with K.Bay.Sts.B.'s purchase of the LAG's infrastructure on 1 January 1908 for 3.5 million gold marks and the subsequent upgrade of the line. In 1911/1912 the current Garmisch-Partenkirchen station was built west of the Partnach river.

=== Electrification ===
The Mittenwald Railway from Innsbruck to Garmisch, which was completed in 1912, was from the beginning planned as an electrified line, but electrical operations from Garmisch to the Austrian border were delayed to 25 April 1913 because the power station and deliveries of locomotives were not complete. About a month later, electrical operations were extended to Murnau. It was not until 1924, with the commissioning of the Walchensee Hydroelectric Power Station, that the long-standing electrification plans were completed. On 3 December 1924, electrical services commenced on the Garmisch-Murnau route and on 5 January 1925 they were extended to Weilheim. On 16 February electrical services continued to Starnberg and on the night of 19/20 February 1925 the first electric train made a test run to Munich Hauptbahnhof. On 21 February the first electrically hauled train–an express–ran to Munich from Garmisch and after 23 February all passenger trains on the route operated electrically. The commissioning of electrification between Murnau and Munich therefore only required 45 days in total.

=== Track doubling ===
In 1933 the Garmisch-Murnau line was reclassified as a main line. The line had to be upgraded for the 1936 Winter Olympics to be held in Garmisch-Partenkirchen. Since the Murnau–Garmisch section was built as a local railway, it needed to be upgraded in a short period of time. The section had especially sharp bends and weak bridges. There were more problems on the Hechendorf-Murnau section, including a 2.6% grade, which sometimes required trains had to be so assisted by pusher locomotives. This involved complex movements with the pusher locomotive having to return to the bottom of the steep section on the single track section. For these reasons, on 26 and 27 March 1935 the management board of Deutsche Reichsbahn (German Railways) agreed to the duplication of the Huglfing–Hechendorf section. The upgrade would need to be completed by the beginning of winter 1935 in order to be ready for the 1936 Winter Olympics. In addition to the second track, the original track has been improved, curves had to be widened and the stations at Huglfing, Uffing, Murnau and Hechendorf had to be upgraded considerably. On 18 December 1935 the upgraded section was put back into service, although this required large structures such as a six-metre-high bridge over Highway 2 and the reconstruction of the bridge where the Oberammergau line crosses the line in Murnau. The second track in the Huglfing-Murnau section was dismantled in 1942 and 1943 as a result of the war. Ballast and sleepers from the line were used in the conversion of the Oberammergau line to the standard German electrical system in 1954. The Murnau–Hechendorf section is still operated as two lines. The upgrading of the line in 1935 increased the line speed between Tutzing and Murnau from 80 to 110 km/h and between Murnau and Garmisch-Partenkirchen from 55 to 80 km/h.

=== From 1980 ===
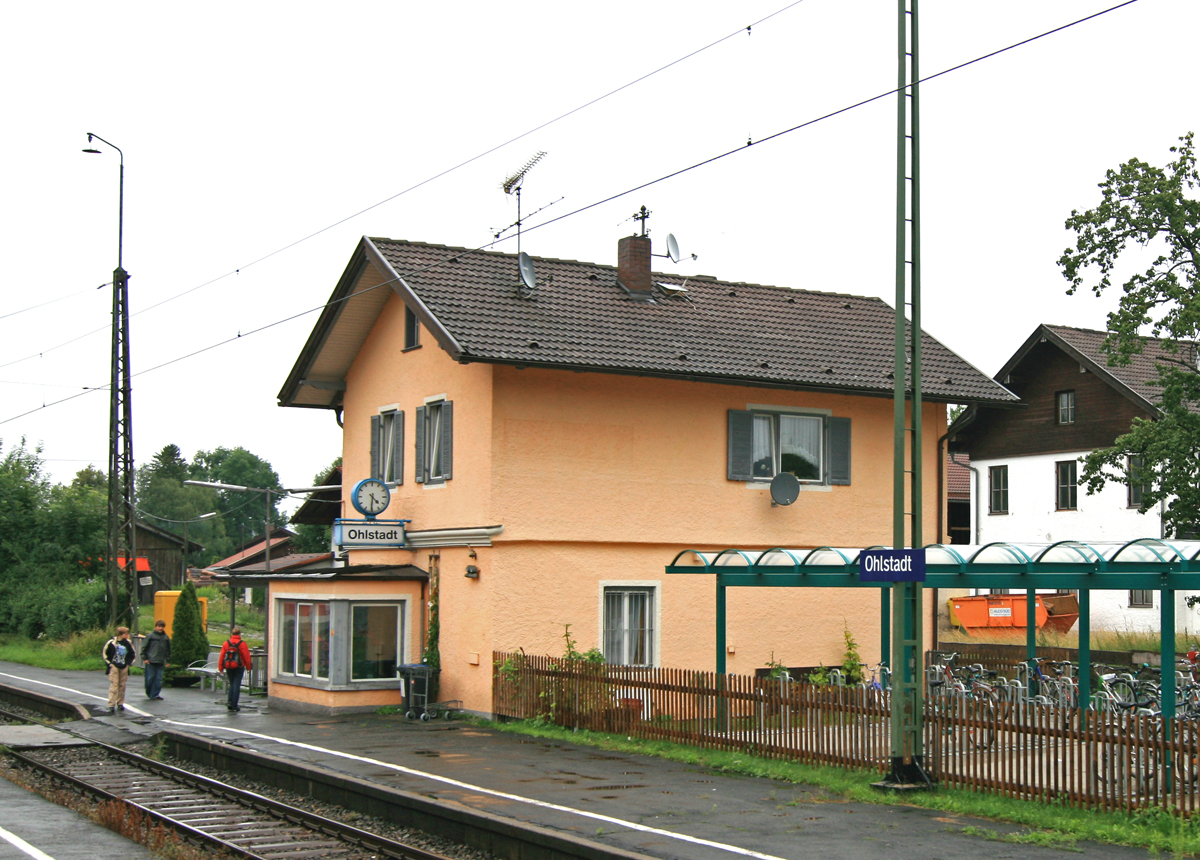
Ohlstadt station

In the early 1980s the Diemendorf, Wilzhofen, Polling, Hechendorf and Farchant stations had low patronage and in June 1984 they were closed together with the Planegg and Gauting stations, which, however, continued to be served by the Munich S-Bahn. Wilzhofen, Polling and Farchant were preserved as crossing loops, but in Diemendorf the second track was dismantled in 1996. Since 1982, there has been an hourly service on the route. In peak times services run at 30-minute intervals.

In 1985, Deutsche Bundesbahn established its first electronic interlocking in Murnau. For three years it was operated in parallel with the existing signal box to gain experience. On 29 November 1988 it took over full control of the operation. On 28 November 2008, however, control of this section of the line was taken over by the Garmisch electronic interlocking.

== Operations ==
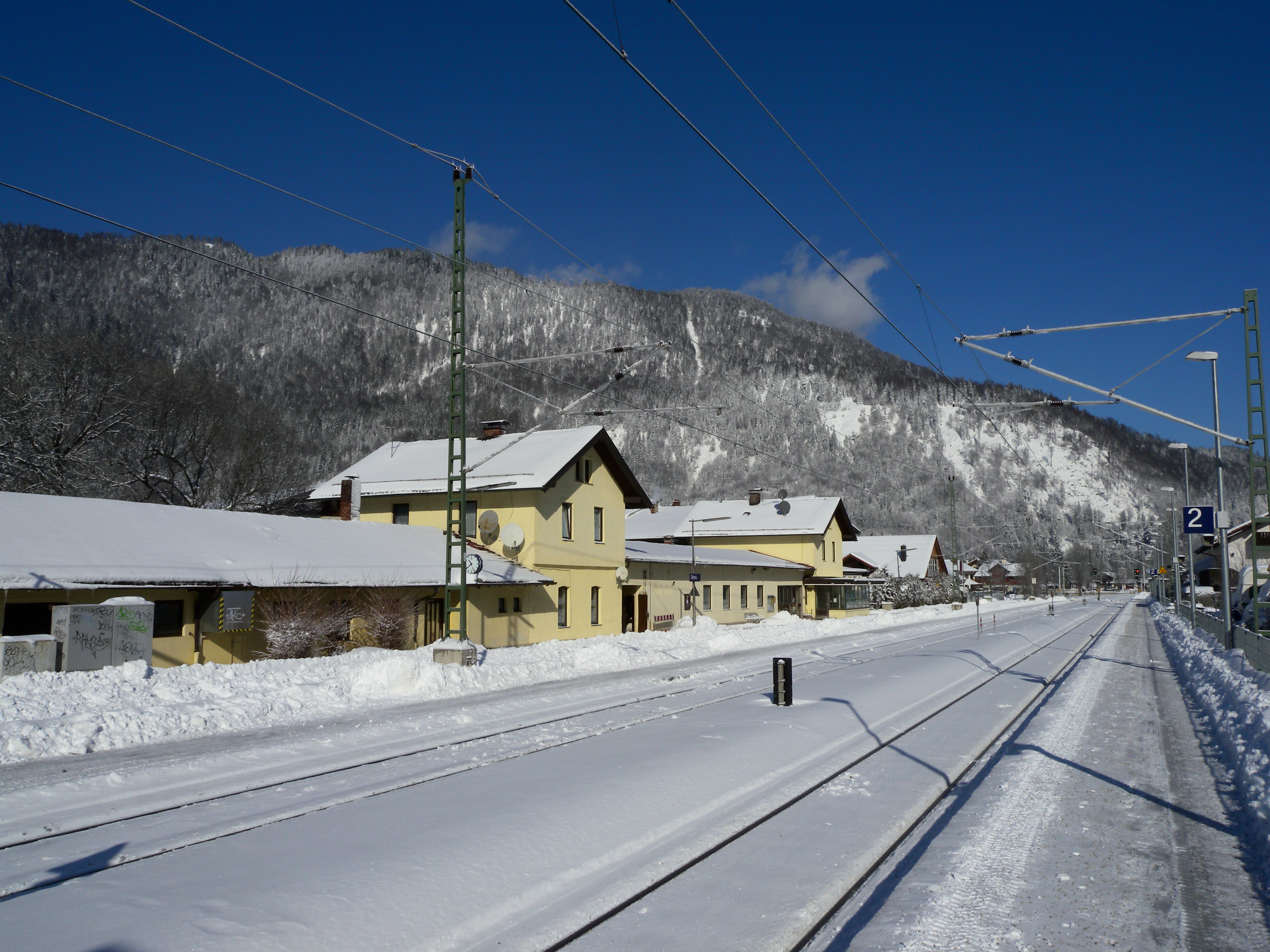
Oberau station (2009)

=== Trains ===
The Garmisch-Partenkirchen line is served by Bombardier Talent 2 Regionalbahn trains. They run every hour with extra trains in the peak hour, stopping at Munich-Pasing, Tutzing and all stations south of Tutzing. The journey takes about 85 minutes, and most services continue to Innsbruck. Additionally, some Intercity-Express trains run on Saturdays and Sundays, taking about 90 minutes, some continuing to Innsbruck. No scheduled freight services operate on the line.

== Accident ==
On 3 June 2022, a double decker regional train had derailed at a curve near Loisachauen in the Burgrain district of Garmisch-Partenkirchen, while it was traveling north between Garmisch-Partenkirchen station and Farchant station. Five people were killed: a 13-year-old boy from the Garmisch-Partenkirchen district, a 51-year-old woman from Wiesbaden, a 70-year-old woman from the Munich district and two female refugees, aged 30 and 39, from Ukraine who had fled the war in their homeland. Additionally 68 passengers were injured, with 16 of them being serious.
