= Seeshaupt station =

Railway station in Seeshaupt, Germany

Seeshaupt
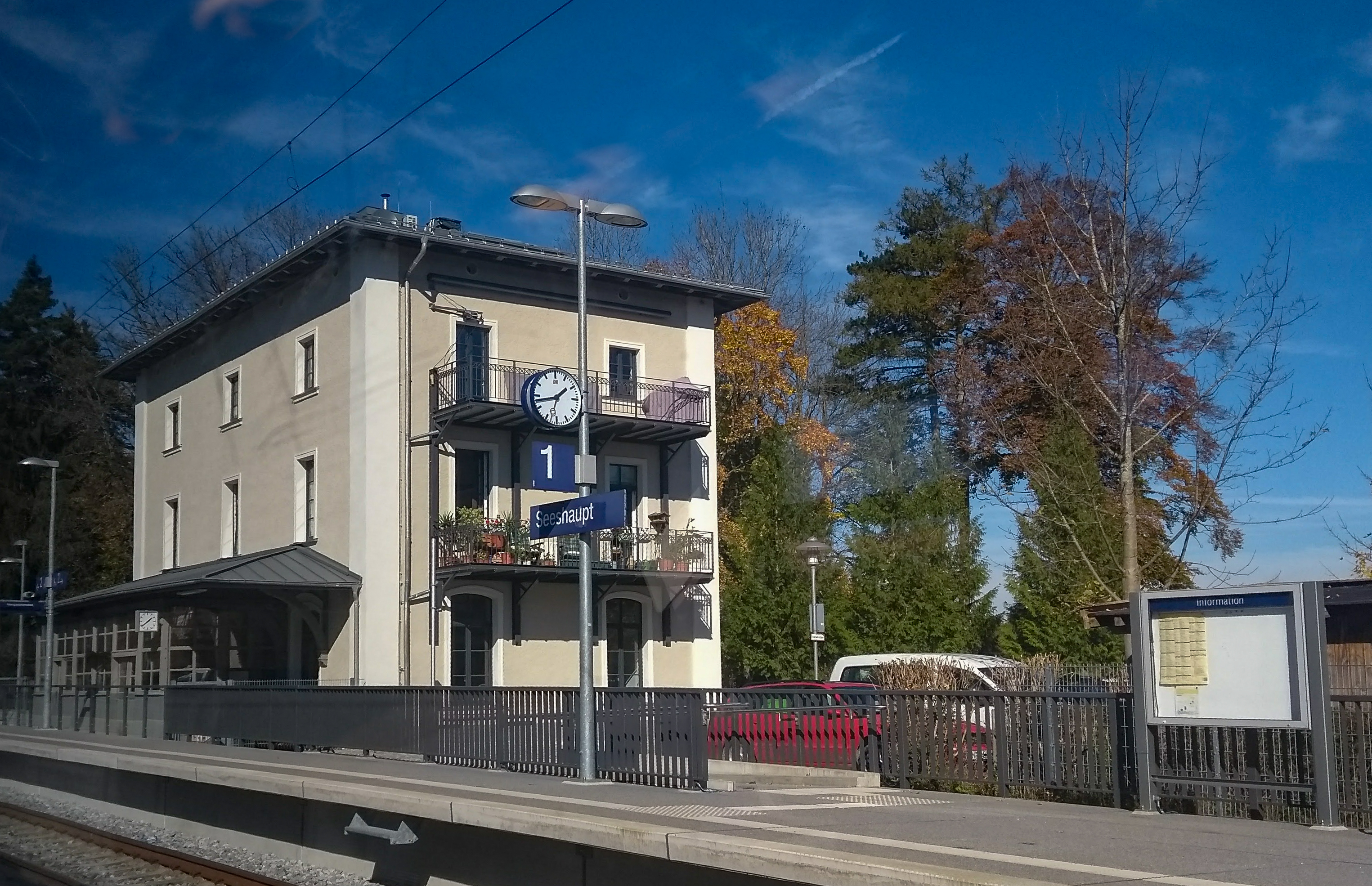
- 2017

General information
- Location: Bahnhofplatz 1; 82402 Seeshaupt; Bavaria; Germany
- Coordinates: 47.8229°N 11.2871°E
- Elevation: 601 m (1,972 ft)
- System: Bf
- Owner: Deutsche Bahn
- Operator: DB Netz; DB Station&Service
- Lines: Kochelsee Railway (KBS 961)
- Platforms: 2 side platforms
- Tracks: 2
- Train operators: DB Regio Bayern
- Connections: 373

Construction
- Parking: yes
- Cycle facilities: yes
- Accessible: yes

Other information
- Station code: 5798
- DS100 code: MSE
- IBNR: 8005508
- Category: 6
- Website: www.bahnhof.de

Services
Preceding station	DB Regio Bayern	Following station
Iffeldorf towards Kochel	RB 66	Bernried towards München Hbf
Location

Seeshaupt station (German: Bahnhof Seeshaupt) is a railway station in the municipality of Seeshaupt, located in the Weilheim-Schongau district in Bavaria, Germany.
