= Bernried station =

Railway station in Bavaria, Germany

Bernried
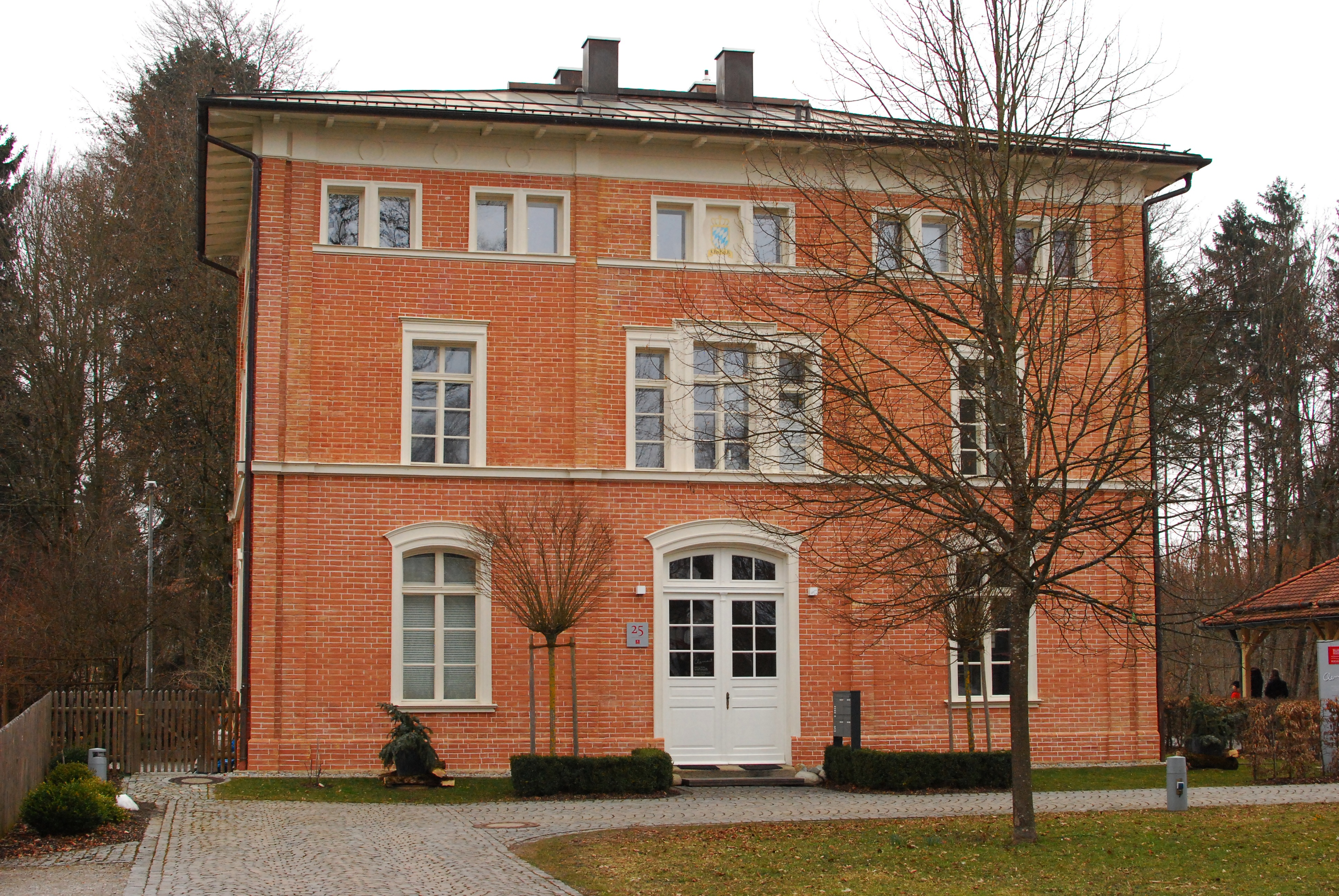
- The station building in 2013

General information
- Location: Bahnhofstraße 25; 82347 Bernried am Starnberger See; Bavaria; Germany
- Coordinates: 47°51′41″N 11°17′01″E
- Elevation: 633 m (2,077 ft)
- System: Hp
- Owner: Deutsche Bahn
- Operator: DB Netz; DB Station&Service
- Lines: Kochelsee Railway (KBS 961)
- Platforms: 1 side platform
- Tracks: 1
- Train operators: DB Regio Bayern
- Connections: 9614

Construction
- Parking: yes
- Cycle facilities: yes
- Accessible: yes

Other information
- Station code: 578
- DS100 code: MBER
- IBNR: 8000918
- Category: 6
- Website: www.bahnhof.de

Services
Preceding station	DB Regio Bayern	Following station
Seeshaupt towards Kochel	RB 66	Tutzing towards München Hbf
Location

Bernried station (German: Haltepunkt Bernried) is a railway station in the municipality of Bernried am Starnberger See, located in the Weilheim-Schongau district in Bavaria, Germany.

== Notable places nearby ==
- Bernrieder Park
- Starnberger See
