= Penzberg station =

Railway station in Bavaria

Penzberg
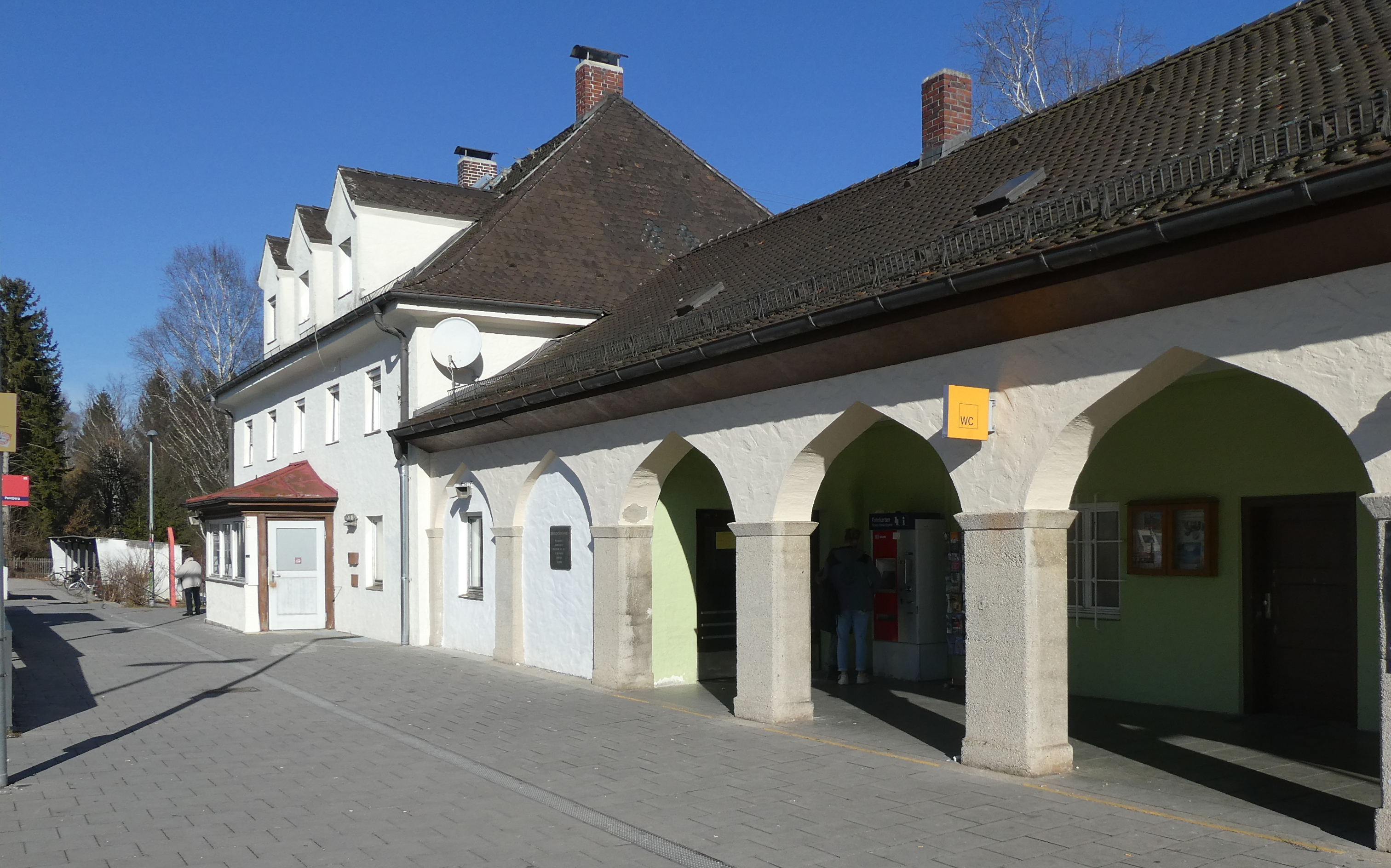
- The station building in 2020

General information
- Location: Penzberg, Bavaria; Germany
- Coordinates: 47°44′57″N 11°22′19″E
- Owner: DB Netz
- Operator: DB Station&Service
- Lines: Kochelsee line (KBS 961)
- Distance: 22.4 km (13.9 mi) from Tutzing
- Platforms: 1 side platform
- Tracks: 1
- Train operators: DB Regio Bayern
- Connections: Regionalverkehr Oberbayern buses

Other information
- Station code: 4896
- DS100 code: MPZ
- IBNR: 8004767
- Category: 6

Services
Preceding station	DB Regio Bayern	Following station
Bichl towards Kochel	RB 66	Iffeldorf towards München Hbf
Location

Penzberg station (German: Bahnhof Penzberg), also known as Penzberg Pbf, is a railway station in the city of Penzberg, in Bavaria, Germany. It is located on the Kochelsee line of Deutsche Bahn.

== Services ==
As of the December 2021 timetable change, the following services stop at Penzberg:

- RB: hourly service between München Hauptbahnhof and Kochel.
