= Benediktbeuern =

- Municipality
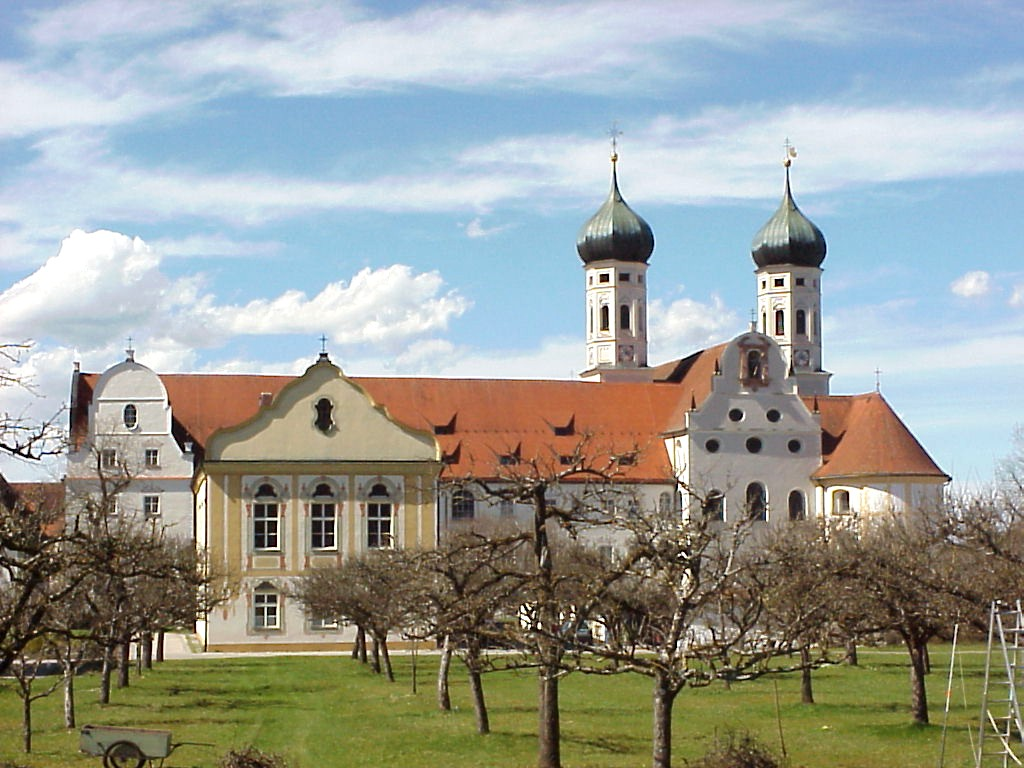
- Benediktbeuern Abbey

- Coat of arms

- Location of Benediktbeuern within Bad Tölz-Wolfratshausen district
- Interactive map of Benediktbeuern
- Location within Germany Location within Bavaria
- Coordinates: 47°42′28.0″N 11°23′59.9″E
- Country: Germany
- State: Bavaria
- Admin. region: Oberbayern
- District: Bad Tölz-Wolfratshausen
- Municipal assoc.: Benediktbeuern

Government
  - Mayor (2019–25): Anton Ortlieb

Area
  - Total: 37.86 km^{2} (14.62 sq mi)
- Elevation: 640 m (2,100 ft)

Population (2025-12-31)
  - Total: 3,768
  - Density: 99.52/km^{2} (257.8/sq mi)
- Time zone: UTC+01:00 (CET)
  - Summer (DST): UTC+02:00 (CEST)
- Postal codes: 83671
- Dialling codes: 08857
- Vehicle registration: TÖL
- Website: benediktbeuern.de

Benediktbeuern (German pronunciation: [benədɪktˈbɔʏɐn]; Central Bavarian: Benediktbeiern) is a municipality in the district of Bad Tölz-Wolfratshausen in Bavaria, Germany, 2 kilometres, or 1.25 miles from Bichl. The village has 3,602 residents as of 31 December 2019.

The medieval Latin name of Benediktbeuern was Buria (adjective: Buranus).

Benediktbeuern has a famous monastery, formerly belonging to the Benedictine Order, called Benediktbeuern Abbey, which was founded in about 739. Its name is well known because of the Carmina Burana ('Benediktbeuern songs') manuscript found there in 1803 and subsequently set to music by Carl Orff. Since 1930, the Salesians of Don Bosco have lived in this monastery.

Johann Wolfgang von Goethe visited Benediktbeuern during his third journey to Italy in 1786.

The secular village itself - its ribbon-development clearly distinct from the abbey's edifices - was called Laingruben until 30 November 1865, when it was permitted to take the name of the monastery. Benediktbeuern has kept the structure of a traditional village near the Alps. The village can be used as a base for day trips to many places of interest, and it has become a tourist resort. Many residents of the village commute to Penzberg, Wolfratshausen/Geretsried and Munich.

Important road connections are the A95 motorway from Munich to Garmisch-Partenkirchen and federal highway B472 from east to west. From Benediktbeuern station trains run from Kochel to Munich in an hour, and the village has a bus connection to Bad Tölz.
