= Bichl station =

Railway station in Bavaria

Bichl
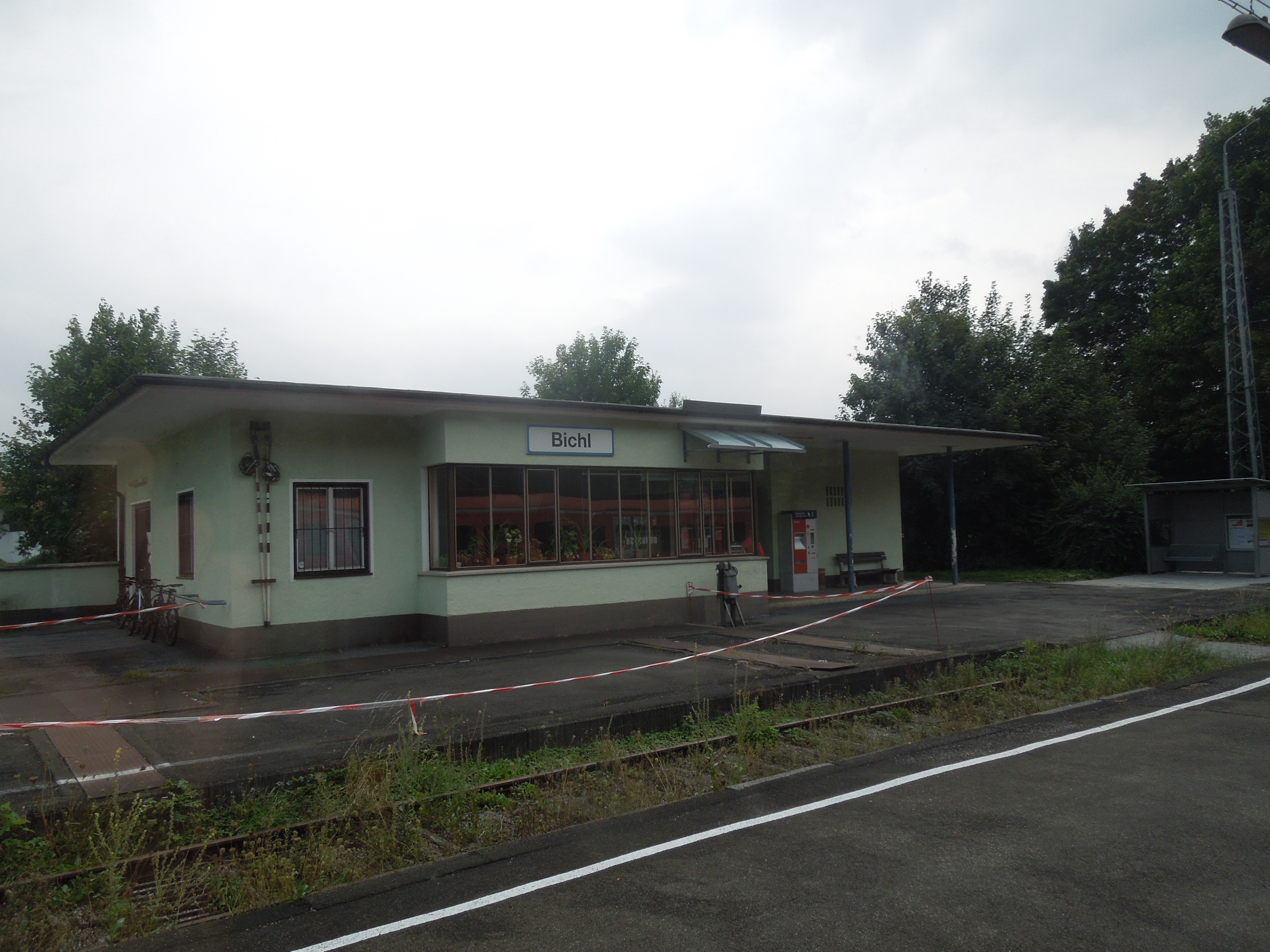
- The station building in 2012

General information
- Location: Bichl, Bavaria; Germany
- Coordinates: 47°43′25″N 11°24′31″E
- Owner: DB Netz
- Operator: DB Station&Service
- Lines: Kochelsee line (KBS 961); Isar Valley line (abandoned)
- Distance: 27.2 km (16.9 mi) from Tutzing
- Platforms: 1 island platform
- Tracks: 2
- Train operators: DB Regio Bayern
- Connections: Regionalverkehr Oberbayern buses

Other information
- Station code: 616
- DS100 code: MBIC
- IBNR: 8000945
- Category: 6

Services
Preceding station	DB Regio Bayern	Following station
Benediktbeuern towards Kochel	RB 66	Penzberg towards München Hbf
Location

Bichl station (German: Bahnhof Bichl) is a railway station in the municipality of Bichl, in Bavaria, Germany. It is located on the Kochelsee line of Deutsche Bahn and was formerly the southern terminus of the Isar Valley line, before it was cut back to Wolfratshausen.

== Services ==
As of the December 2021 timetable change, the following services stop at Bichl:

- RB: hourly service between München Hauptbahnhof and Kochel.
