= Iffeldorf station =

Railway station in Bavaria

Iffeldorf
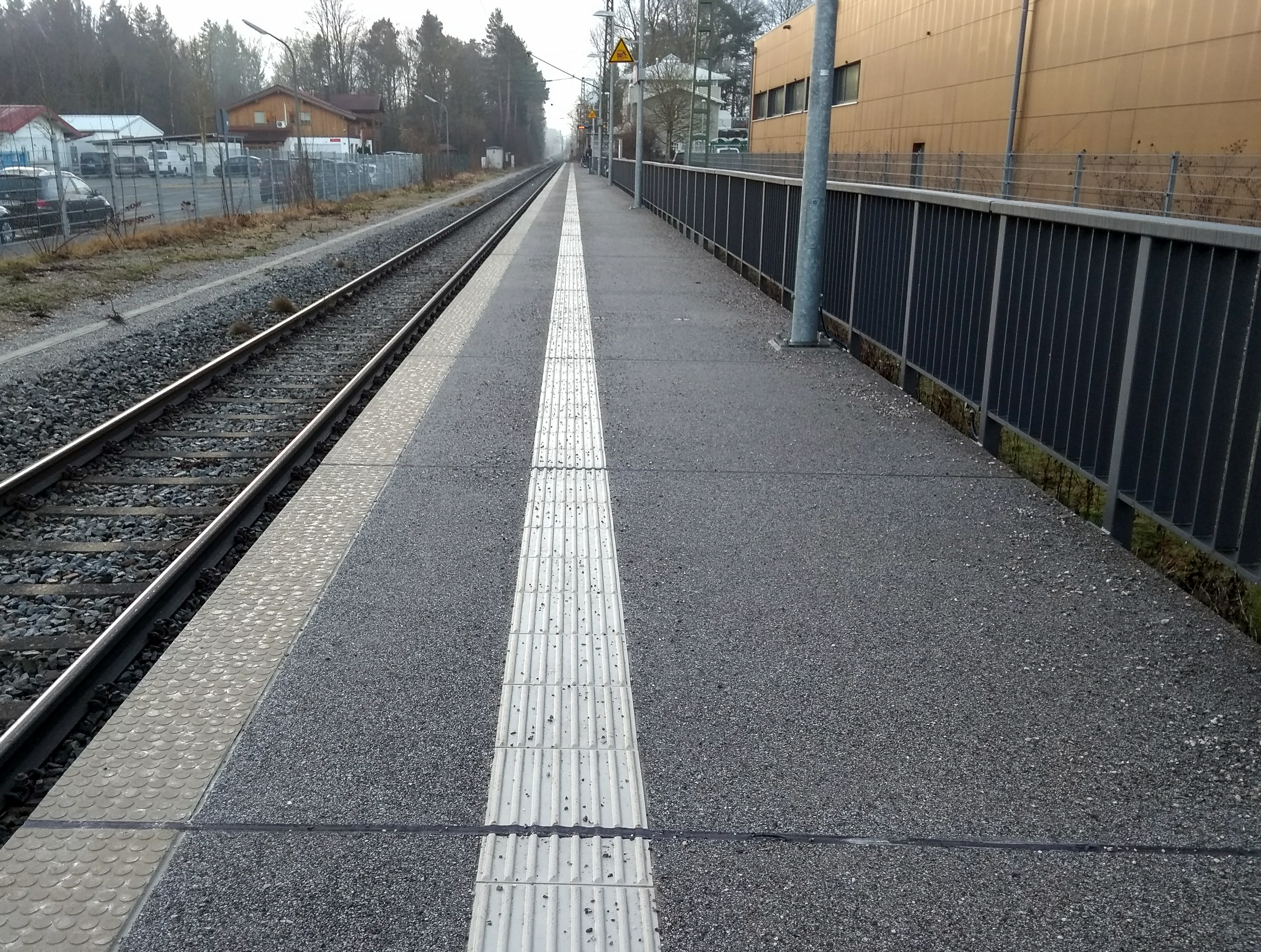
- Looking south down the platform in 2018

General information
- Location: Iffeldorf, Bavaria; Germany
- Coordinates: 47°46′56″N 11°19′44″E
- Owner: DB Netz
- Operator: DB Station&Service
- Lines: Kochelsee line (KBS 961)
- Distance: 17.2 km (10.7 mi) from Tutzing
- Platforms: 1 side platform
- Tracks: 1
- Train operators: DB Regio Bayern
- Connections: Regionalverkehr Oberbayern buses

Other information
- Station code: 5965
- DS100 code: MSTA
- IBNR: 8005672
- Category: 6

Services
Preceding station	DB Regio Bayern	Following station
Penzberg towards Kochel	RB 66	Seeshaupt towards München Hbf
Location

Iffeldorf station (German: Bahnhof Iffeldorf), formerly known as Staltach, is a railway station in the municipality of Iffeldorf, in Bavaria, Germany. It is located on the Kochelsee line of Deutsche Bahn.

== Services ==
As of the December 2021 timetable change, the following services stop at Iffeldorf:

- RB: hourly service between München Hauptbahnhof and Kochel.
