= Rita Kapfhammer =

German opera, operetta, concert and Lieder mezzo-soprano

Rita Kapfhammer (born 9 February 1964) is a German opera, operetta, concert and lieder singer mezzo-soprano-alto.

== Life ==
Born in Bad Tölz, Kapfhammer grew up in Bad Heilbrunn. She attended the Erzbischöfliches St.-Ursula-Gymnasium Schloss Hohenburg Lenggries and then initially trained as a hotel manager. From 1988 to 1995 she studied singing with Reri Grist and Jan-Hendrik Rootering as well as in the Lied class with Helmut Deutsch and in the Oratorio class with Diethard Hellmann at the Hochschule für Musik und Theater München.

Kapfhammer was a member of the ensemble at Theater Ulm from 1997 to 2007, where she sang roles such as Santuzza (Cavalleria rusticana), Jane Seymour (Anna Bolena), Amneris (Aida), Dalila (Samson et Dalila), Adalgisa (Norma), Suzuki (Madama Butterfly), Azucena (Il trovatore), Josepha Vogelhuber (Im weißen Rößl), Dolly Gallagher (Hello, Dolly! ), Leokadja Begbick (Rise and Fall of the City of Mahagonny) and Mrs. Lovett (Sweeney Todd).

This was followed by an engagement as an ensemble member at the Staatstheater am Gärtnerplatz from 2007 to 2012, where she made her debut as Marcellina (the marriage of Figaro) and Carmen) Other roles included Marzelline (Il barbiere di Siviglia), Frau Reich (The Merry Wives of Windsor), Third Lady (the magic flute), Gertrud (Hänsel and Gretel), Nancy (Martha) and Pamela (Fra Diavolo).

She has made guest appearances at the Opera Baltica in Gdańsk, the Mallorca Festival, the Theater Koblenz, the Staatstheater Nürnberg, the Meiningen Court Theatre, the Theater Regensburg and the Historisches Stadttheater Weißenhorn. Since 2012, she has been an ensemble member at the Anhaltisches Theater in Dessau.

Zudem ist Kapfhammer auch als Konzert- und Liedsängerin tätig. Sie konzertierte u. a. in der Berliner Philharmonie, in Herkulessaal, im Bayerisches Nationalmuseum, and in the Vöhlinschloss in Illertissen. She sang in the Messiah by Händel, in Bach's St John and St Matthew Passion, the Mass in B minor, as well as in the Christmas Oratorio by J. S. Bach, in Dvořák's Stabat Mater, Beethoven's Missa Solemnis and Frank Martin's Golgatha.
