= Benediktbeuern station =

Railway station in Bavaria

Benediktbeuern
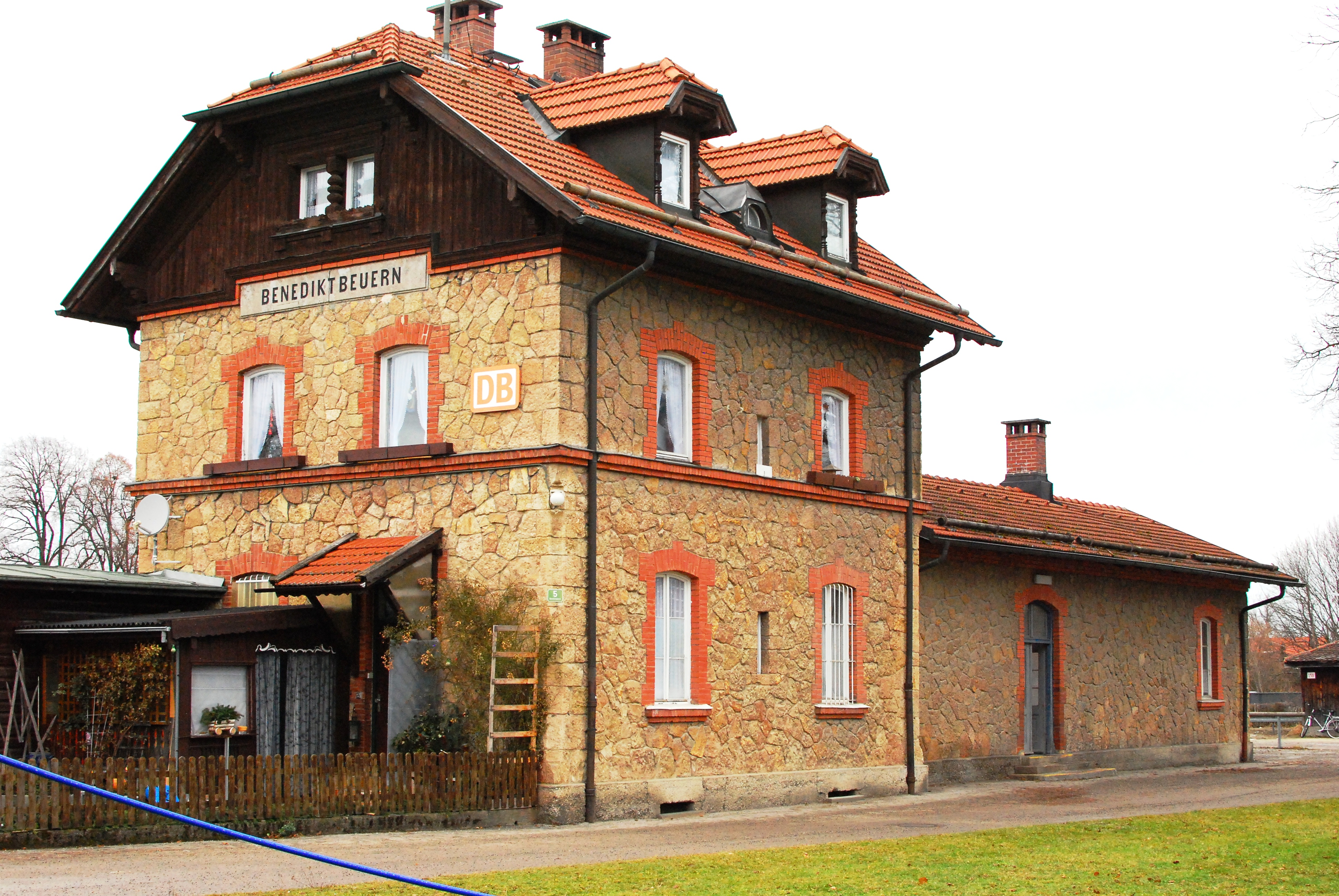
- The station building in 2013

General information
- Location: Benediktbeuern, Bavaria; Germany
- Coordinates: 47°42′33″N 11°24′11″E
- Owner: DB Netz
- Operator: DB Station&Service
- Lines: Kochelsee line (KBS 961)
- Distance: 28.9 km (18.0 mi) from Tutzing
- Platforms: 1 side platform
- Tracks: 1
- Train operators: DB Regio Bayern

Other information
- Station code: 480
- DS100 code: MBEN
- IBNR: 8000869
- Category: 6

Services
Preceding station	DB Regio Bayern	Following station
Kochel Terminus	RB 66	Bichl towards München Hbf
Location

Benediktbeuern station (German: Bahnhof Benediktbeuern) is a railway station in the municipality of Benediktbeuern, in Bavaria, Germany. It is located on the Kochelsee line of Deutsche Bahn.

== Services ==
As of the December 2021 timetable change, the following services stop at Benediktbeuern:

- RB: hourly service between München Hauptbahnhof and Kochel.
