= Ellbach (Isar) =

River in Germany

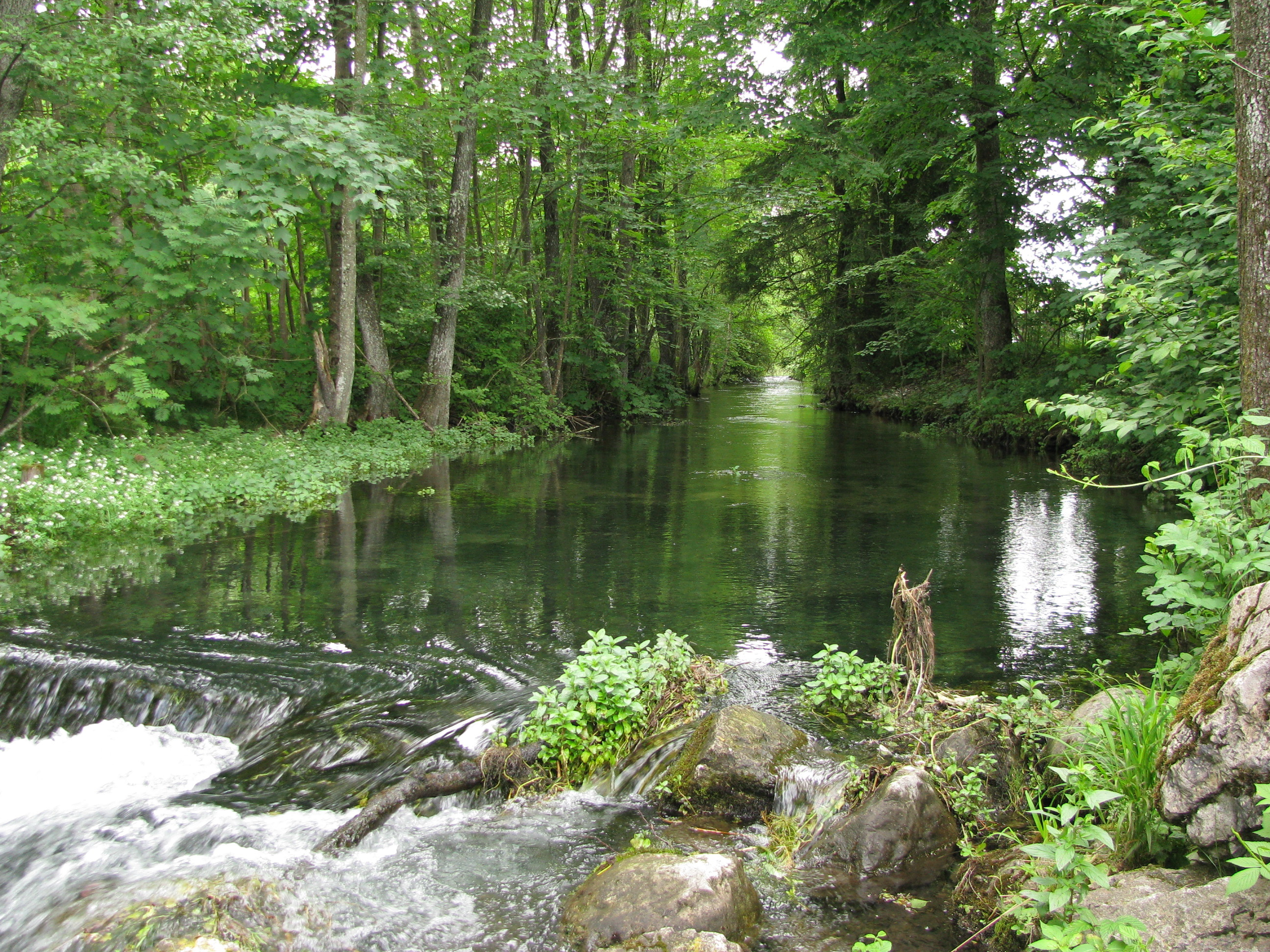
- The Ellbach

Location
- Country: Germany
- State: Bavaria
- District: Bad Tölz-Wolfratshausen

Physical characteristics
- Source
  - location: West of Ellbach (belongs to Bad Tölz)
  - coordinates: 47.7776°N 11.598°E
- Mouth
  - location: In Bad Tölz into the Isar
  - coordinates: 47.7611°N 11.5569°E

Basin features
- Progression: Isar→ Danube→ Black Sea

Ellbach is a river of Bavaria, Germany, in the district Bad Tölz-Wolfratshausen.

The Ellbach springs west of the hamlet Ellbach (belongs to Bad Tölz). It is a right tributary of the Isar in Bad Tölz.

== See also ==
- List of rivers of Bavaria
