= Bananafishbones =

Bananafishbones is the name of:

- a song by the Cure from the album The Top
- a German rock band of Sebastian Horn
