= Fischhaber =

Fischhaber is a German surname. Notable people with the surname include:

- Simon Fischhaber (born 1990), German ice hockey player
- Anton Fischhaber (born 1940), German racing driver
