= Sachsenkam =

- Municipality
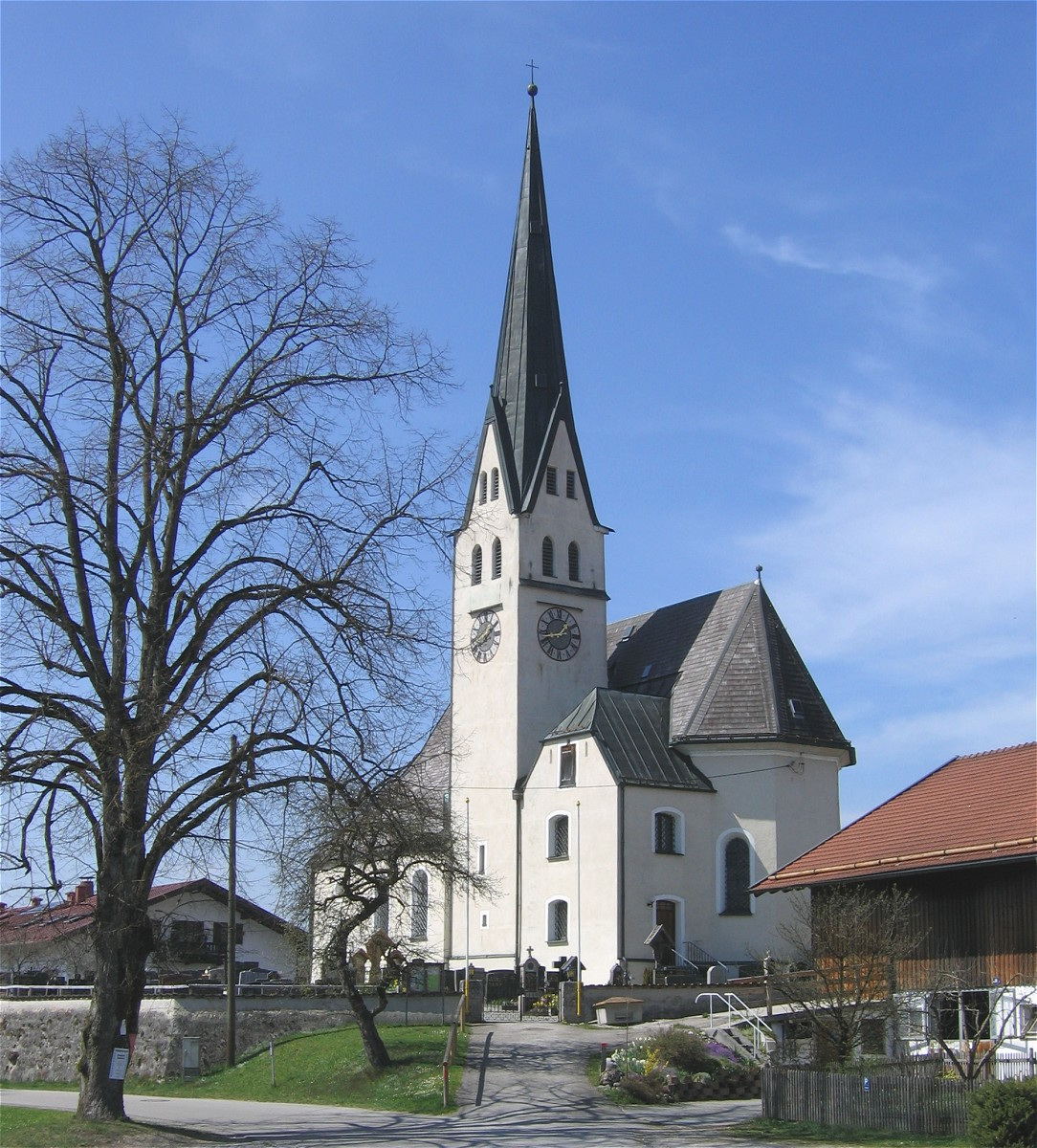
- Church of Saint Andrew

- Coat of arms

- Location of Sachsenkam within Bad Tölz-Wolfratshausen district
- Interactive map of Sachsenkam
- Location within Germany Location within Bavaria
- Coordinates: 47°48′N 11°39′E
- Country: Germany
- State: Bavaria
- Admin. region: Oberbayern
- District: Bad Tölz-Wolfratshausen
- Municipal assoc.: Reichersbeuern

Government
  - Mayor (2020–26): Andreas Rammler

Area
  - Total: 15.92 km^{2} (6.15 sq mi)
- Elevation: 713 m (2,339 ft)

Population (2025-12-31)
  - Total: 1,329
  - Density: 83.48/km^{2} (216.2/sq mi)
- Time zone: UTC+01:00 (CET)
  - Summer (DST): UTC+02:00 (CEST)
- Postal codes: 83679
- Dialling codes: 08021
- Vehicle registration: TÖL
- Website: www.sachsenkam.de

Sachsenkam (German pronunciation: [ˈzaksn̩ˌkaːm]) is a municipality in the district of Bad Tölz-Wolfratshausen in Bavaria in Germany.
