= Simon Fischhaber =

German ice hockey player

- Born: 19 February 1990 (age 36) Greiling, West Germany
- Height: 6 ft 2 in (188 cm)
- Weight: 184 lb (83 kg; 13 st 2 lb)
- Position: Left Wing
- Shot: Left
- Played for: Nürnberg Ice Tigers; Iserlohn Roosters
- Playing career: 2009–2017

Simon Fischhaber (born 19 February 1990 in Greiling) is a German former professional ice hockey left winger. He played in the Deutsche Eishockey Liga for the Sinupret Ice Tigers and the Iserlohn Roosters.

== Playing career ==
Fischhaber began his career with Tölzer Löwen, where he was a dynamic offensive player scoring 66 points in 70 games with the team. He also proved to be a clutch playoff performer for Tölzer Löwen, netting 4 points in 5 playoff games. In the 2007 CHL Import Draft, Fischhaber was chosen by the Sault Ste. Marie Greyhounds with the 55th overall selection. At age 16, Simon joined the Sault Ste. Marie Greyhounds of the Ontario Hockey League. Simon was an outstanding defensive forward and penalty killer in his 2 seasons with the Greyhounds, scoring 2 goals and 17 points in 106 games spread over 2 seasons. On 29 April 2009, Simon turned back to Germany and signed a two-year contract with the Sinupret Ice Tigers.

== International ==
Fischhaber was a member of the German national under-20 ice hockey team and represented his country at the 2009 World Junior Ice Hockey Championships. Fischhaber was perhaps Germany's best player in the tournament, scoring the game-winning goal in the team's lone win over Kazakhstan. He finished the tournament with 1 goal and 3 points in 4 games.

== Personal ==
His father Balthasar was a longtime member of EHC Klostersee, and his elder brother Christoph Fischhaber played two games for the Thomas Sabo Ice Tigers.
