= Karl Wald =

German football referee

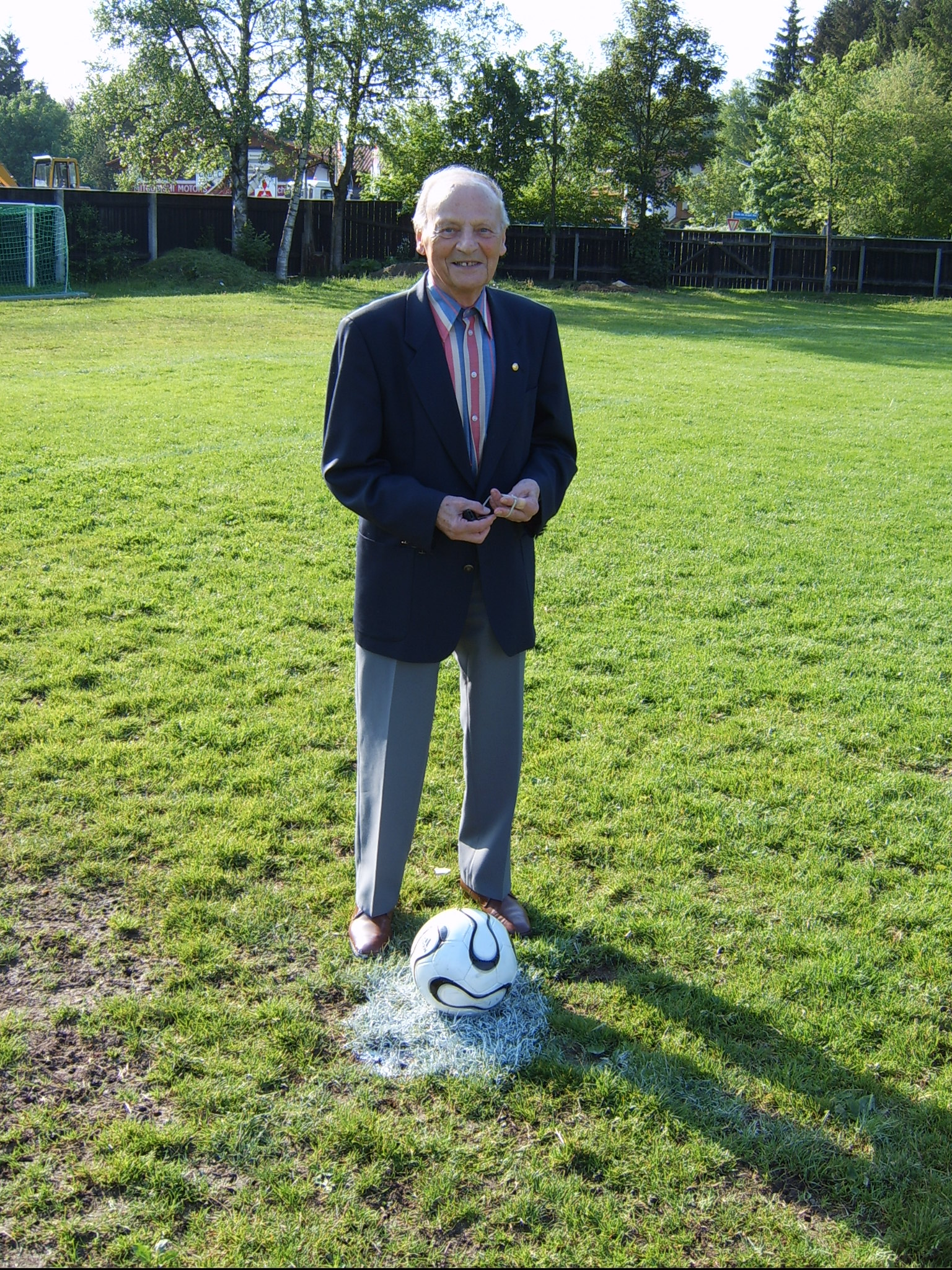
Karl Wald, 2006

Karl Wald (17 February 1916 in Frankfurt am Main – 26 July 2011 in Penzberg) was a German football referee.

== Life ==
In 2006, Deutsche Presse-Agentur reported a claim by former football referee Karl Wald, from Frankfurt am Main, that he had first proposed the shoot-out in 1970 to the Bavarian FA. Wald was married and had two daughters.
