= Iffeldorf =

- Municipality
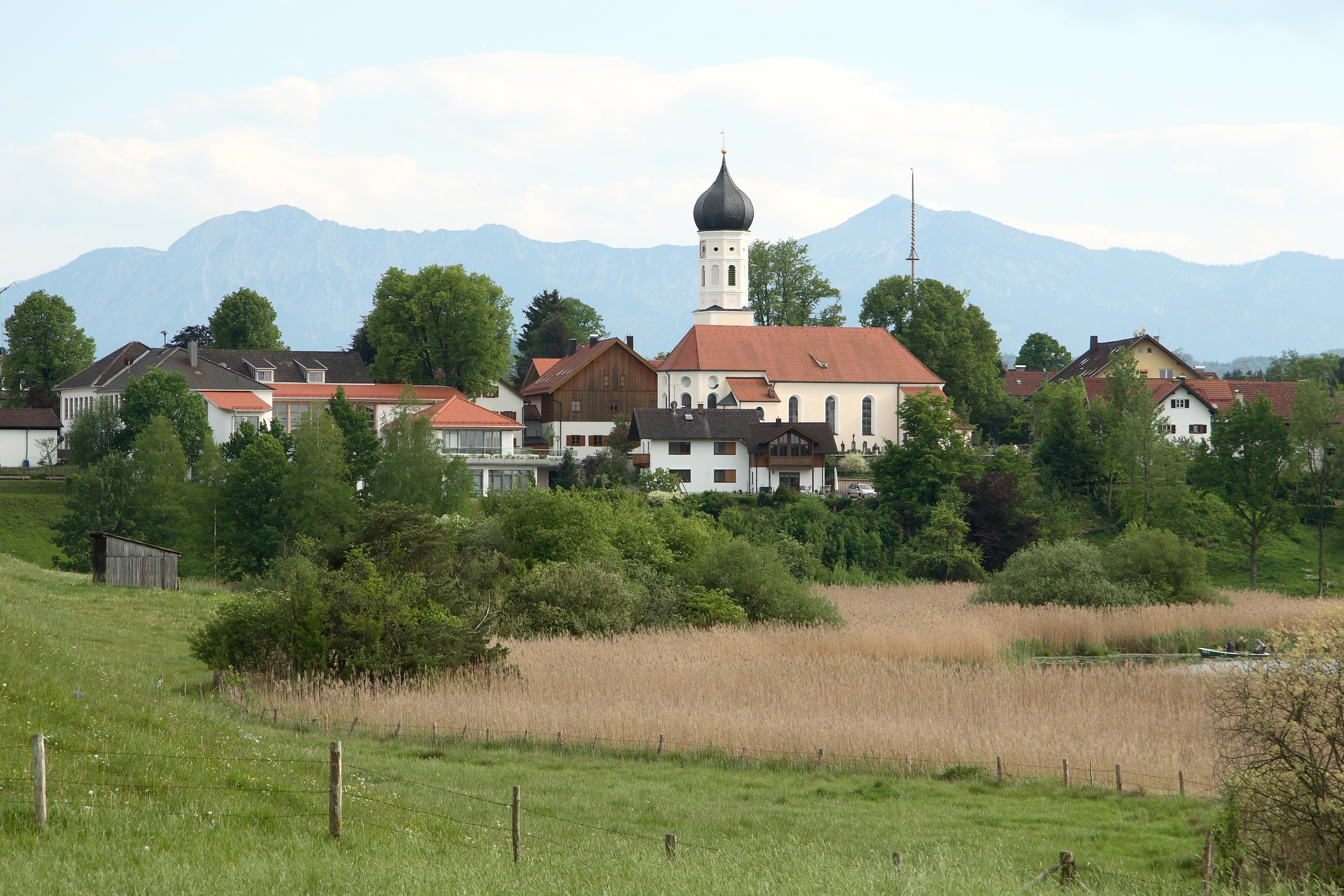
- Iffeldorf with its Church, in the background the Alps

- Coat of arms

- Location of Iffeldorf within Weilheim-Schongau district
- Interactive map of Iffeldorf
- Location within Germany Location within Bavaria
- Coordinates: 47°46′15.6″N 11°19′11.6″E
- Country: Germany
- State: Bavaria
- Admin. region: Oberbayern
- District: Weilheim-Schongau
- Municipal assoc.: Seeshaupt

Government
  - Mayor (2020–26): Hans Lang

Area
  - Total: 27.61 km^{2} (10.66 sq mi)
- Elevation: 603 m (1,978 ft)

Population (2025-12-31)
  - Total: 2,707
  - Density: 98.04/km^{2} (253.9/sq mi)
- Time zone: UTC+01:00 (CET)
  - Summer (DST): UTC+02:00 (CEST)
- Postal codes: 82393
- Dialling codes: 08856, 08801
- Vehicle registration: WM
- Website: www.iffeldorf.de

Iffeldorf is a municipality in the Weilheim-Schongau district of Bavaria, Germany.

== Transport ==
The municipality has a railway station, Iffeldorf, on the Kochelsee Railway.
