= Benediktbeuern (Verwaltungsgemeinschaft) =

- Verwaltungsgemeinschaft
- Location of Benediktbeuern within Bad Tölz-Wolfratshausen district
- Interactive map of Benediktbeuern
- Location within Germany Location within Bavaria
- Coordinates: 47°42′N 11°25′E
- Country: Germany
- State: Bavaria
- Admin. region: Upper Bavaria
- District: Bad Tölz-Wolfratshausen
- Seat: Benediktbeuern
- Subdivisions: 2 municipalities

Area
  - Total: 51.79 km^{2} (20.00 sq mi)

Population (2025-12-31)
  - Total: 6,091
  - Density: 117.6/km^{2} (304.6/sq mi)
- Time zone: UTC+01:00 (CET)
  - Summer (DST): UTC+02:00 (CEST)
- Website: vg.benediktbeuern.de

Benediktbeuern is a Verwaltungsgemeinschaft (municipal association) in the district of Bad Tölz-Wolfratshausen in Bavaria, Germany. Its seat is in Benediktbeuern.

It consists of the following municipalities:

1. Benediktbeuern
2. Bichl
