= Reichersbeuern =

- Municipality
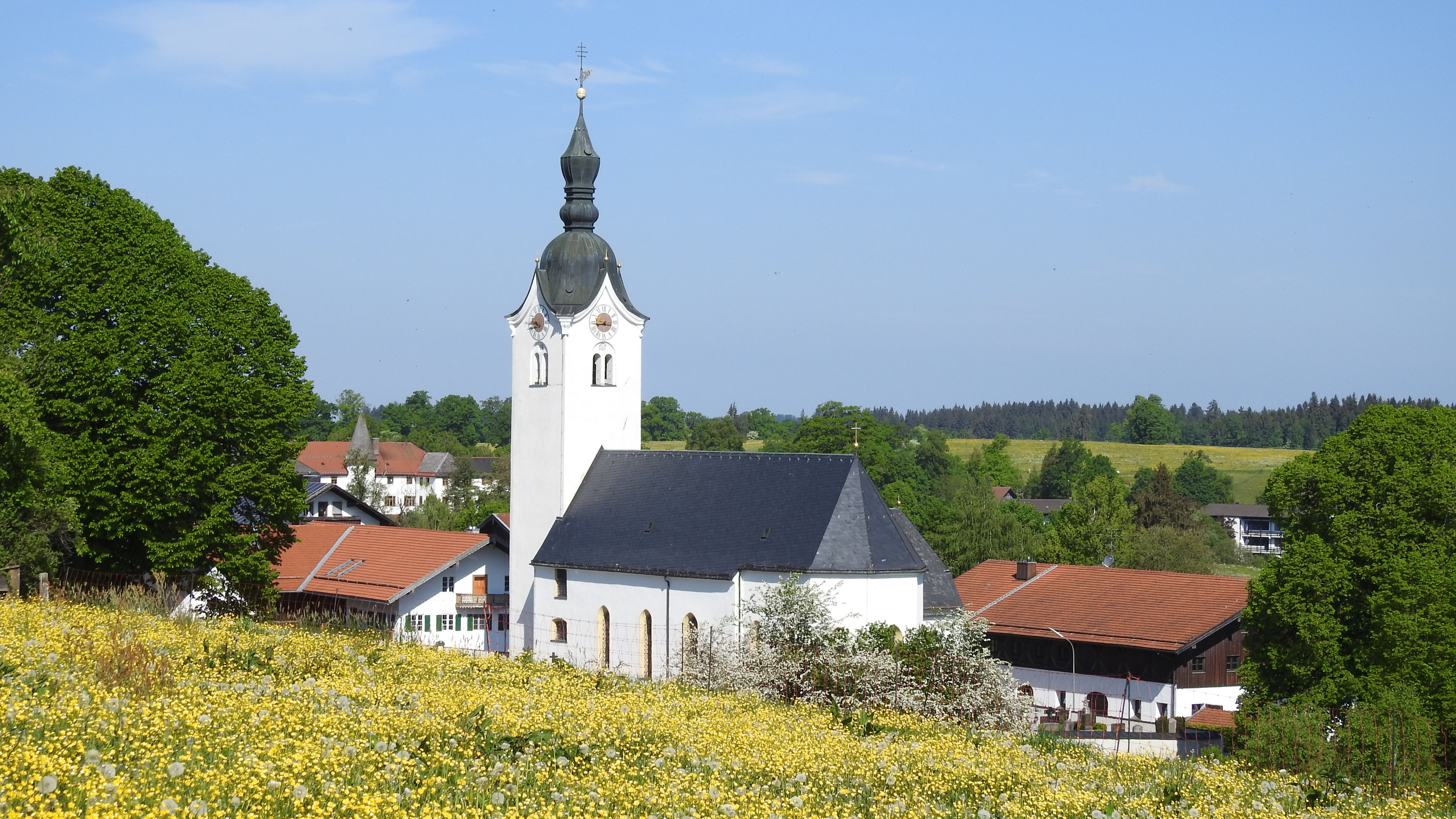
- Church of Saint Korbinian

- Coat of arms

- Location of Reichersbeuern within Bad Tölz-Wolfratshausen district
- Interactive map of Reichersbeuern
- Location within Germany Location within Bavaria
- Coordinates: 47°46′N 11°38′E
- Country: Germany
- State: Bavaria
- Admin. region: Oberbayern
- District: Bad Tölz-Wolfratshausen
- Municipal assoc.: Reichersbeuern

Government
  - Mayor (2020–26): Ernst Dieckmann (FW)

Area
  - Total: 15.41 km^{2} (5.95 sq mi)
- Elevation: 716 m (2,349 ft)

Population (2025-12-31)
  - Total: 2,497
  - Density: 162.0/km^{2} (419.7/sq mi)
- Time zone: UTC+01:00 (CET)
  - Summer (DST): UTC+02:00 (CEST)
- Postal codes: 83677
- Dialling codes: 08041
- Vehicle registration: TÖL
- Website: www.reichersbeuern.de

Reichersbeuern (German pronunciation: [ˈʁaɪçɐsˌbɔʏɐn]) is a municipality in the district of Bad Tölz-Wolfratshausen in Bavaria in Germany.
