= Egling =

- Municipality
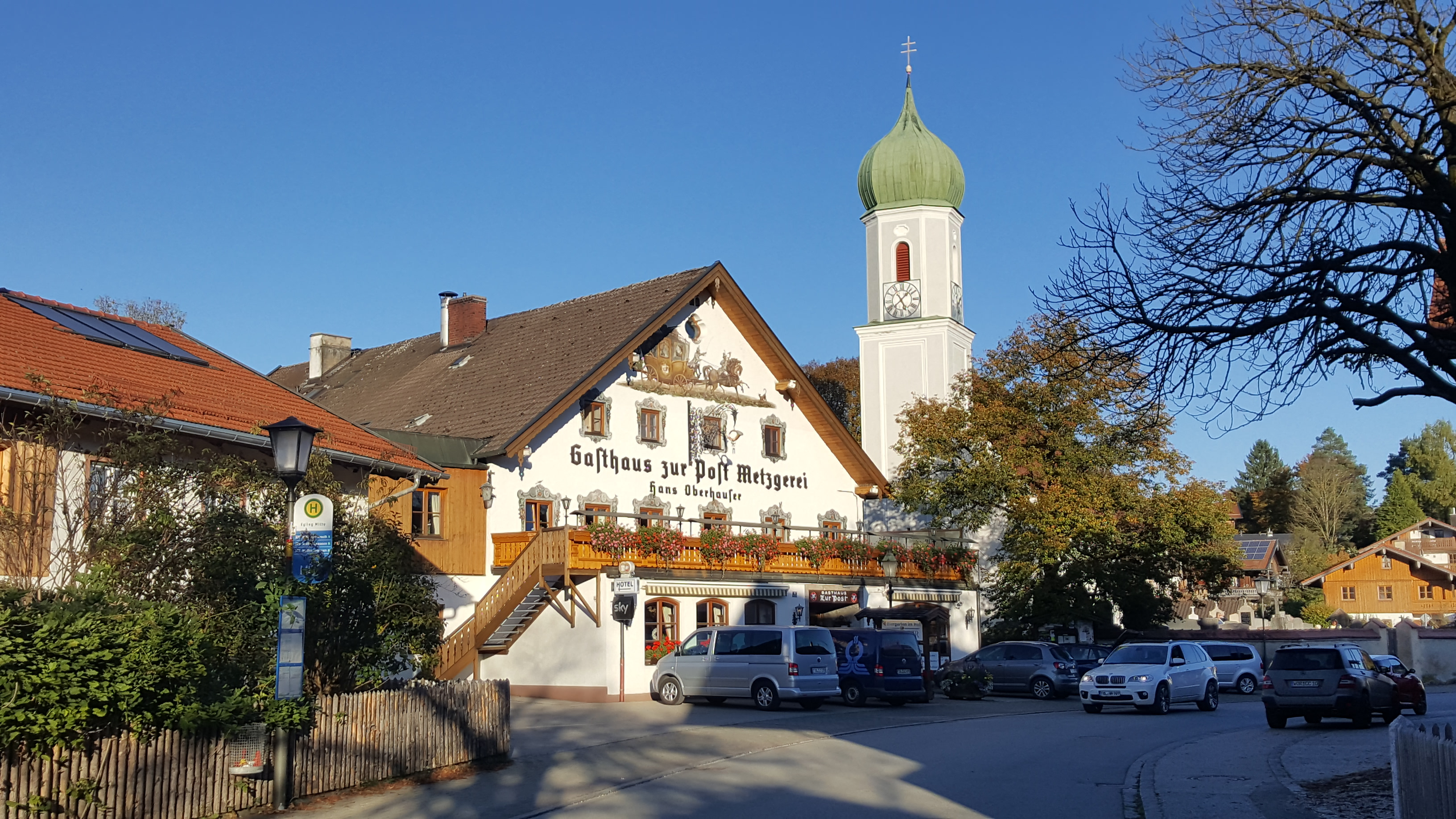
- Gasthaus zur Post and Saint Martin Church

- Coat of arms

- Location of Egling within Bad Tölz-Wolfratshausen district
- Interactive map of Egling
- Location within Germany Location within Bavaria
- Coordinates: 47°55′N 11°31′E
- Country: Germany
- State: Bavaria
- Admin. region: Oberbayern
- District: Bad Tölz-Wolfratshausen

Government
  - Mayor (2020–26): Hubert Oberhauser

Area
  - Total: 74.06 km^{2} (28.59 sq mi)
- Elevation: 609 m (1,998 ft)

Population (2025-12-31)
  - Total: 5,230
  - Density: 70.6/km^{2} (183/sq mi)
- Time zone: UTC+01:00 (CET)
  - Summer (DST): UTC+02:00 (CEST)
- Postal codes: 82544
- Dialling codes: 08176
- Vehicle registration: TÖL
- Website: www.egling.de

Egling (German pronunciation: [ˈeːɡlɪŋ]) is a municipality in the district of Bad Tölz-Wolfratshausen in Bavaria.
