= Königsdorf =

- Municipality
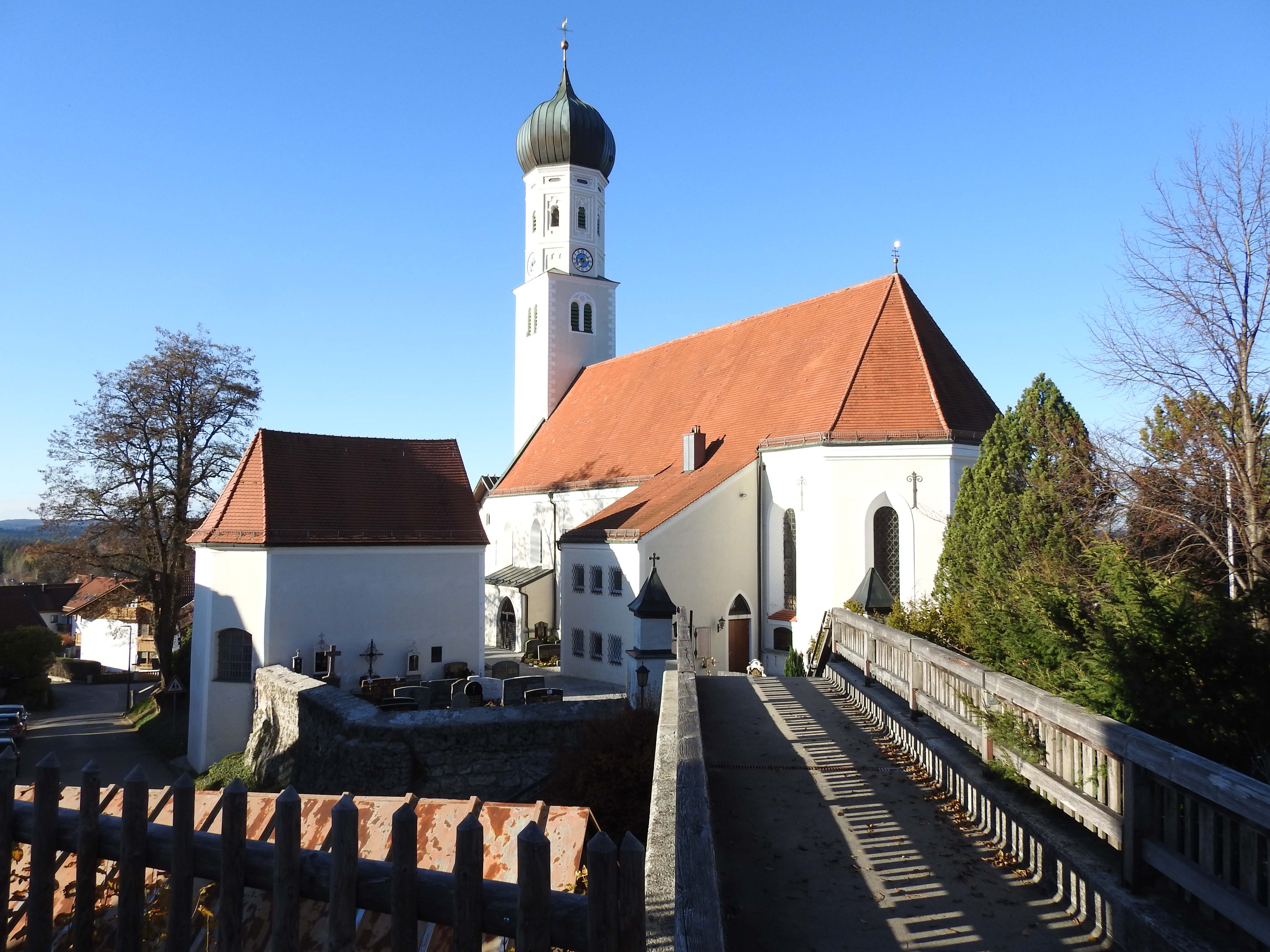
- Church of Saint Lawrence

- Coat of arms

- Location of Königsdorf within Bad Tölz-Wolfratshausen district
- Interactive map of Königsdorf
- Location within Germany Location within Bavaria
- Coordinates: 47°49′N 11°29′E
- Country: Germany
- State: Bavaria
- Admin. region: Oberbayern
- District: Bad Tölz-Wolfratshausen

Government
  - Mayor (2020–26): Rainer Kopnicky (CSU)

Area
  - Total: 45.69 km^{2} (17.64 sq mi)
- Elevation: 625 m (2,051 ft)

Population (2025-12-31)
  - Total: 3,145
  - Density: 68.83/km^{2} (178.3/sq mi)
- Time zone: UTC+01:00 (CET)
  - Summer (DST): UTC+02:00 (CEST)
- Postal codes: 82549
- Dialling codes: 08179 (08046, 08171)
- Vehicle registration: TÖL
- Website: www.gemeinde-koenigsdorf.de

Königsdorf is a municipality in the district of Bad Tölz-Wolfratshausen in Bavaria in Germany.
