= Seeshaupt (Verwaltungsgemeinschaft) =

- Verwaltungsgemeinschaft
- Location of Seeshaupt within Weilheim-Schongau district
- Interactive map of Seeshaupt
- Location within Germany Location within Bavaria
- Coordinates: 47°49′N 11°18′E
- Country: Germany
- State: Bavaria
- Admin. region: Upper Bavaria
- District: Weilheim-Schongau
- Seat: Seeshaupt
- Subdivisions: 2 municipalities

Area
  - Total: 57.56 km^{2} (22.22 sq mi)

Population (2025-12-31)
  - Total: 5,823
  - Density: 101.2/km^{2} (262.0/sq mi)
- Time zone: UTC+01:00 (CET)
  - Summer (DST): UTC+02:00 (CEST)

Seeshaupt is a Verwaltungsgemeinschaft (municipal association) in the district Weilheim-Schongau in Bavaria, Germany. Its seat is in Seeshaupt.

It consists of the following municipalities:

1. Iffeldorf
2. Seeshaupt
