= Reichersbeuern (Verwaltungsgemeinschaft) =

- Verwaltungsgemeinschaft
- Location of Reichersbeuern within Bad Tölz-Wolfratshausen district
- Interactive map of Reichersbeuern
- Location within Germany Location within Bavaria
- Coordinates: 47°47′N 11°38′E
- Country: Germany
- State: Bavaria
- Admin. region: Upper Bavaria
- District: Bad Tölz-Wolfratshausen
- Seat: Reichersbeuern
- Subdivisions: 3 municipalities

Area
  - Total: 38.99 km^{2} (15.05 sq mi)

Population (2025-12-31)
  - Total: 5,308
  - Density: 136.1/km^{2} (352.6/sq mi)
- Time zone: UTC+01:00 (CET)
  - Summer (DST): UTC+02:00 (CEST)
- Website: www.vgreichersbeuern.de

Reichersbeuern is a Verwaltungsgemeinschaft (municipal association) in the district of Bad Tölz-Wolfratshausen in Bavaria, Germany. Its seat is in Reichersbeuern.

It consists of the following municipalities:

1. Greiling
2. Reichersbeuern
3. Sachsenkam
