= Bad Tölz =

- Town
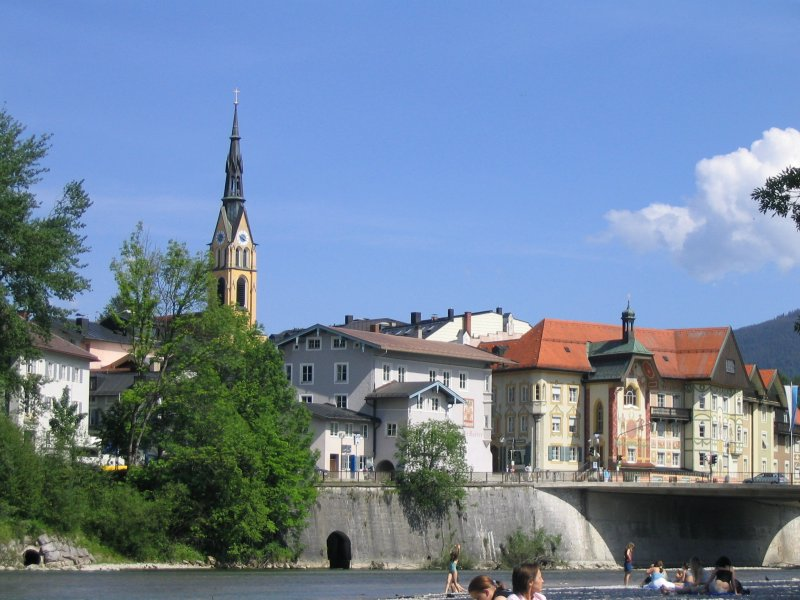
- Bad Tölz seen from River Isar

- Coat of arms

- Location of Bad Tölz within Bad Tölz-Wolfratshausen district
- Interactive map of Bad Tölz
- Location within Germany Location within Bavaria
- Coordinates: 47°45′37″N 11°33′24″E
- Country: Germany
- State: Bavaria
- Admin. region: Oberbayern
- District: Bad Tölz-Wolfratshausen
- Subdivisions: 5 Ortsteile

Government
  - Mayor (2020–26): Ingo Mehner (CSU)

Area
  - Total: 30.8 km^{2} (11.9 sq mi)
- Elevation: 658 m (2,159 ft)

Population (2025-12-31)
  - Total: 19,652
  - Density: 638/km^{2} (1,650/sq mi)
- Time zone: UTC+01:00 (CET)
  - Summer (DST): UTC+02:00 (CEST)
- Postal codes: 83646
- Dialling codes: 08041
- Vehicle registration: TÖL
- Website: www.bad-toelz.de

Bad Tölz (German: [baːt ˈtœlts]; Bavarian: Däiz) is a town in Bavaria, Germany and the administrative center of the Bad Tölz-Wolfratshausen district.

== History ==
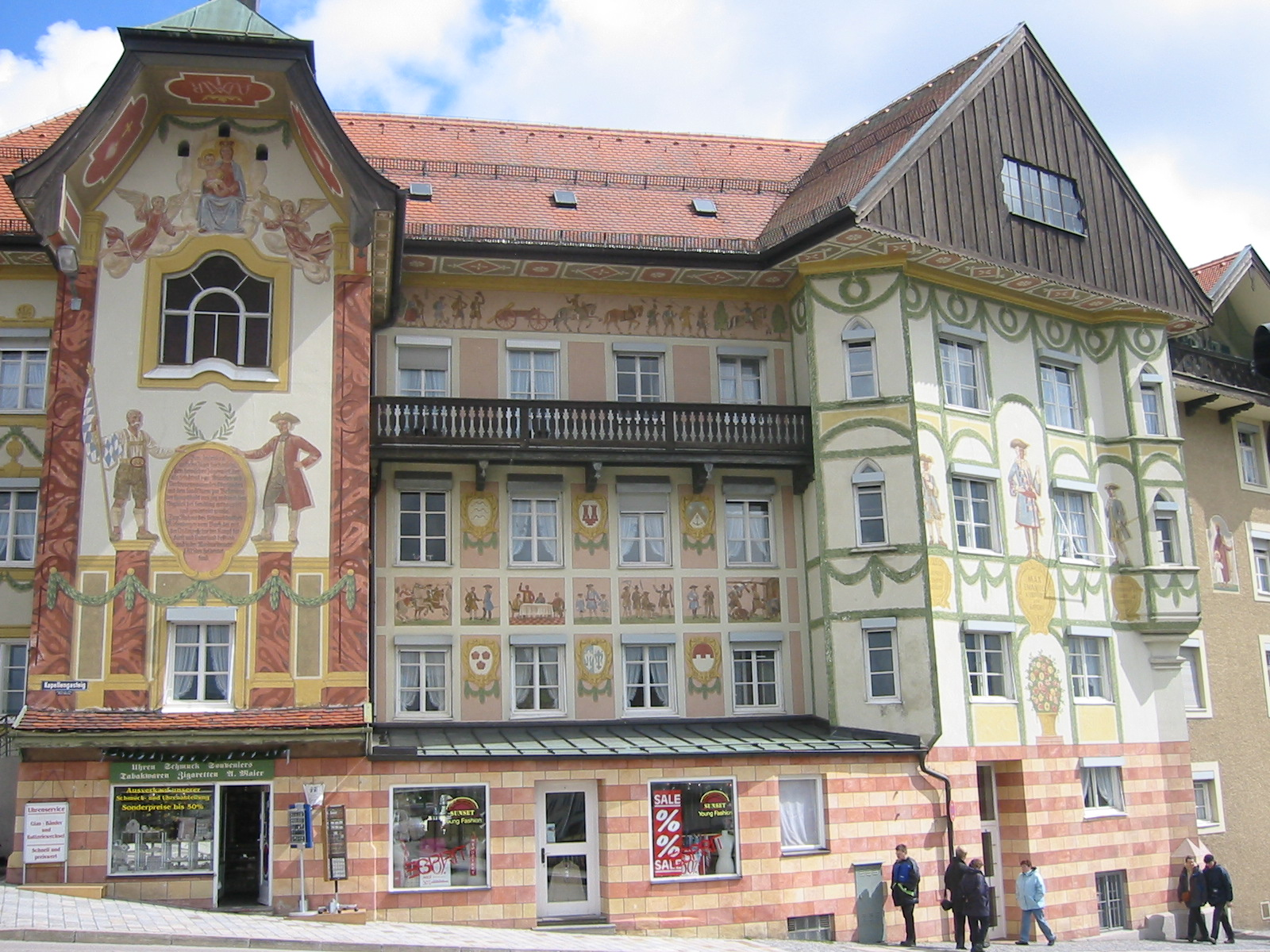
Bad Tölz

Archaeology has shown that Bad Tölz has been continuously occupied since the retreat of the glaciers at the end of the Ice Age. For example, there are finds from the Hallstatt culture as well as from Roman Raetia, or at least occupation by romanized Celts.

The name "Tölz" (as "Tolnze") appears relatively late in documentation at the end of the 12th century. The name "Reginried" appears as that of a settlement belonging to the monastery at Tegernsee in earlier texts, which is probably the same as Reid in the western part of Mühlfeld.

Hainricus de Tolnze built a castle on the site, which controlled the river and road traffic in the region but which no longer exists. In 1331, Louis IV made Tölz a market town.

The 14th century saw Tölz become a crossroads for the salt and lumber traffic on the Isar. In 1453, the market street, church, and castle were destroyed by fire. Duke Albrecht III enabled the city to rebuild, but this time in stone. He also built a palace which stood until 1770, when it fell into disrepair and was eventually undermined by the river Ellbach.

The Thirty Years' War (1618–1648) brought plague and destruction to the region. During the War of the Spanish Succession things began to turn around again, with trade in lime and wood products, among other items. During this war, in 1705, the vintner Johann Jäger of Tölz led a band of farmers to battle at Sendling (south of Munich). The town also became known as a pilgrimage site; every November 6, there is a festival to Saint Leonard of Noblac. In 1718, a chapel was built in his honor on the Calvary hill.

In the middle of the 19th century, Tölz changed direction with the discovery of natural springs. The town began to focus on the healing properties of these springs and became a cure and spa town. In 1899, it became known as Bad Tölz.

In 1937, SS-Junker School Bad Tölz (an SS officer candidate training camp) was established near the town. The school operated until the end of World War II in 1945. A subcamp of the Dachau concentration camp was located in the town. It provided labour for the school and the Zentralbauleitung (Central Administration Building). Bad Tölz would also be the last town to be "passed through" by the Holocaust death march from Dachau to the Austrian border, that would be halted by Nisei U.S. Army artillery soldiers on 2 May 1945, just two kilometers short of the next village to the east of it, Waakirchen. The former SS-Junker school was the base of the U.S. Army's 1st Battalion, 10th Special Forces Group until 1991. (Note: Beginning in 1956, some troops from 10th Special Forces Group at the Bavarian town of Bad Tölz were deployed to Berlin initially as Detachment "A" Berlin which was known as "Outpost of Freedom" among the units of France, the United Kingdom and the United States. The wartime mission of Detachment "A" Berlin (Special Forces Berlin) was classified Top Secret.) It was in Bad Tölz that Amon Göth, commandant of the Nazi concentration camp in Płaszów, in German-occupied Poland during World War II, was arrested and sent for trial in Poland.

Today, Bad Tölz is known for its spas, historic medieval town, and its views of the Alps. On the western bank of the Isar River lies the Kurverwaltung, or modern spa, whose iodine-rich waters are known for their soothing and healing powers. A major attraction was the Alpamare, Europe's first indoor water park with long water slides, wave pool, a surf wave, and a range of thermal outdoor pools with iodine water, until it closed in 2015. Another major attraction is Stadtpfarrkirche, a church built in 1466, which is an example of German late–Gothic architecture.

== Geography ==
Bad Tölz sits on the Isar River, 670 metres above sea level. It occupies 30.8 square kilometres.

=== Climate ===
In Bad Tölz, the average annual high temperature is 10 °C (50 °F), and the annual low temperature is 4 °C (39 °F). Winters are cool to cold, and summers are moderately warm, thanks to its location that close to the Alps. It classifies as humid continental (Dfb).

Climate data for Bad Tölz (1991–2020 normals)
Month	Jan	Feb	Mar	Apr	May	Jun	Jul	Aug	Sep	Oct	Nov	Dec	Year
Mean daily maximum °C (°F)	3.9 (39.0)	5.6 (42.1)	9.4 (48.9)	13.5 (56.3)	18.7 (65.7)	21.6 (70.9)	23.4 (74.1)	23.3 (73.9)	18.8 (65.8)	14.4 (57.9)	7.5 (45.5)	3.8 (38.8)	13.6 (56.5)
Daily mean °C (°F)	−0.9 (30.4)	0.1 (32.2)	3.6 (38.5)	7.5 (45.5)	12.6 (54.7)	15.6 (60.1)	17.3 (63.1)	16.8 (62.2)	12.6 (54.7)	8.4 (47.1)	3.0 (37.4)	−0.3 (31.5)	8.0 (46.4)
Mean daily minimum °C (°F)	−4.9 (23.2)	−4.2 (24.4)	−1.0 (30.2)	2.0 (35.6)	6.6 (43.9)	10.1 (50.2)	12.0 (53.6)	11.7 (53.1)	7.8 (46.0)	4.2 (39.6)	−0.5 (31.1)	−3.6 (25.5)	3.3 (37.9)
Average precipitation mm (inches)	65.1 (2.56)	82.3 (3.24)	114.0 (4.49)	105.2 (4.14)	152.7 (6.01)	169.7 (6.68)	183.0 (7.20)	180.1 (7.09)	123.8 (4.87)	93.7 (3.69)	116.5 (4.59)	94.1 (3.70)	1,483.8 (58.42)
Average precipitation days (≥ 1.0 mm)	13.8	14.8	17.4	16.7	16.6	19.1	17.4	15.5	15.8	14.7	15.7	16.6	194.5
Average relative humidity (%)	81.7	79.9	77.5	74.1	72.6	74.0	74.6	77.5	81.9	82.2	85.8	85.5	78.9
Mean monthly sunshine hours	55.2	72.8	105.7	138.7	178.5	180.4	197.6	181.7	132.7	101.1	54.1	41.3	1,427.8
Source: World Meteorological Organization

== Transport ==
Bad Tölz is served by the Munich to Lenggries line of the Bayerische Oberlandbahn railway (Green Line).

== International relations ==
=== Twin towns and sister cities ===
Bad Tölz is twinned with:

- Vichy, Allier, Auvergne-Rhône-Alpes, France (since 1965)

=== Notable people ===
- Konrad Abeltshauser (born 1992), hockey player
- Sebastian Horn (born 1970) musician and TV presenter
- Eusebius Amort (1692-1775), a Catholic theologian
- Hans Carossa (1878-1956), poet and author
- Annemarie Gerg (born 1975), alpine skier
- Michaela Gerg (born 1965), alpine skier
- Rita Kapfhammer (born 1964), mezzo-soprano
- Johann Nepomuk Sepp (1816-1909), historian, keeper of the monastery Wessobrunn, organizer of Winzerer monument

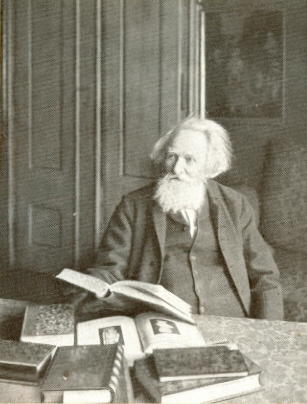
Johann Nepomuk Sepp

=== Notables who have worked locally ===
- Franz Hanfstaengl (1804-1877), painter, lithographer and photographer
- Thomas Mann (1875-1955), writer, possessed here from 1906 to 1917 a summer villa, today Villa man
- Hans von Hentig (1887-1974), criminologist
- Grethe Weiser (1903-1970), actress, died after a traffic accident in the city hospital Bad Toelz
- Norbert Schultze (1911-2002), composer and conductor
- Marie-Luise Schultze-Jahn (1918-2010), a member of the White Rose
- Gregor Dorfmeister (born 1929) journalist and writer, grew up in Tolz; he talked about his time in the Hitler Youth and the Volkssturm in partially autobiographical book The Bridge
- Kristian Schultze (1945-2011), composer, arranger, keyboardist and music producer, lives in Bad Tölz since 2002
- Ottfried Fischer (born 1953), comedian and actor, as the main character in Der Bulle von Tölz , he increased with many other actors awareness of Bad Tölz nationwide and internationally
