= Bichl =

- Municipality
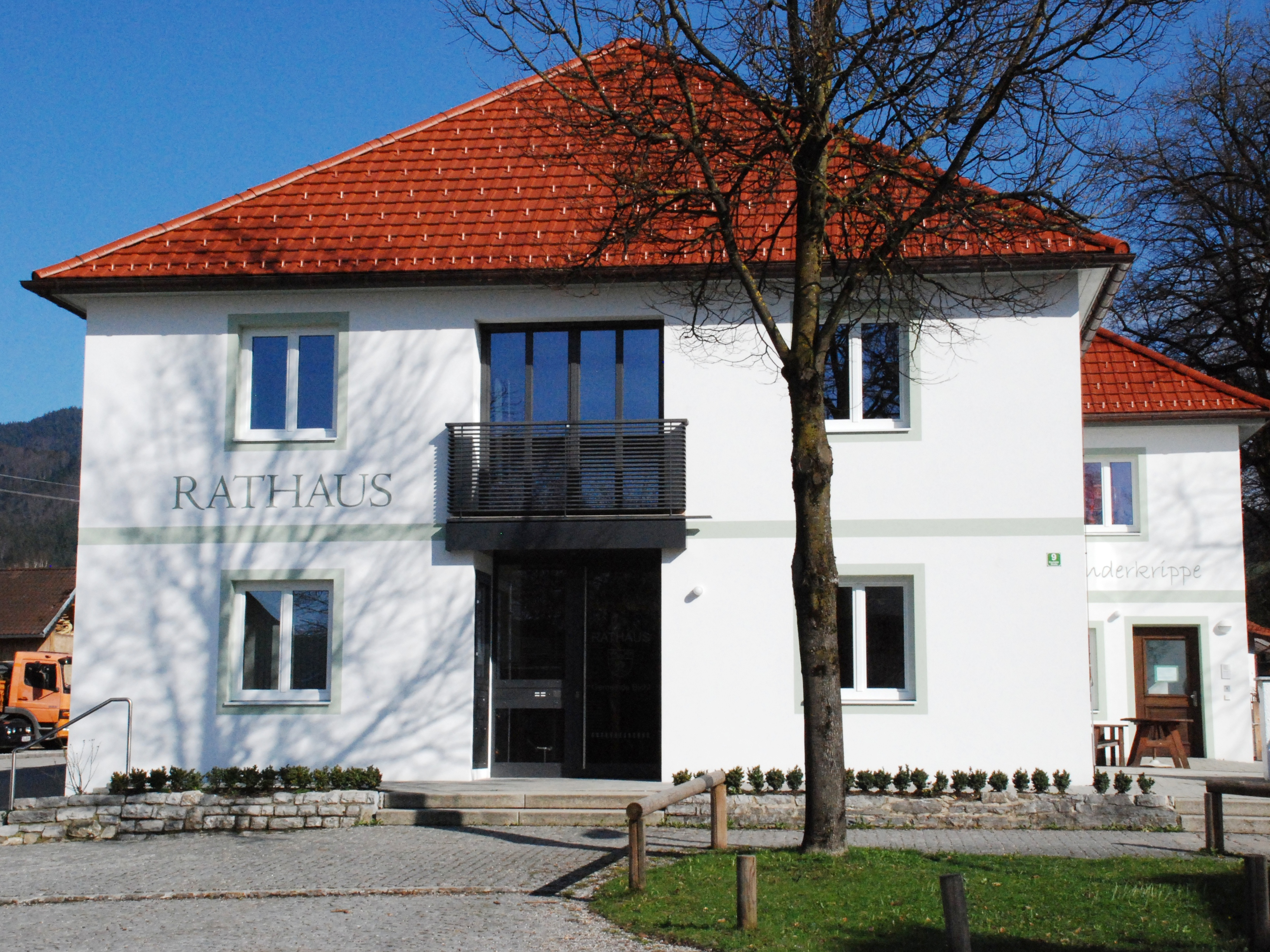
- Town hall

- Coat of arms

- Location of Bichl within Bad Tölz-Wolfratshausen district
- Interactive map of Bichl
- Location within Germany Location within Bavaria
- Coordinates: 47°43′14″N 11°24′43″E
- Country: Germany
- State: Bavaria
- Admin. region: Oberbayern
- District: Bad Tölz-Wolfratshausen
- Municipal assoc.: Benediktbeuern

Government
  - Mayor (2020–26): Benedikt Pössenbacher

Area
  - Total: 13.92 km^{2} (5.37 sq mi)
- Elevation: 625 m (2,051 ft)

Population (2025-12-31)
  - Total: 2,323
  - Density: 166.9/km^{2} (432.2/sq mi)
- Time zone: UTC+01:00 (CET)
  - Summer (DST): UTC+02:00 (CEST)
- Postal codes: 83673
- Dialling codes: 08857
- Vehicle registration: TÖL
- Website: www.bichl.de

Bichl is a municipality in the district of Bad Tölz-Wolfratshausen in Bavaria, Germany. It is located at 47°43′N 11°25′E, and has about 2000 residents. The village first appears in documents from 1048.

The name "Bichl" refers to hill upon which the village church, St. George, stands. The church was built by Johann Michael Fischer. The origin of the name Bichl comes from the Bavarian word for hill "Bühel" which appears in many place names, where Austro-Bavarian dialects are spoken. For example: Kitzbühel.

== Transport ==
The municipality has a railway station, Bichl, on the Kochelsee Railway.
