= Greiling =

- Municipality
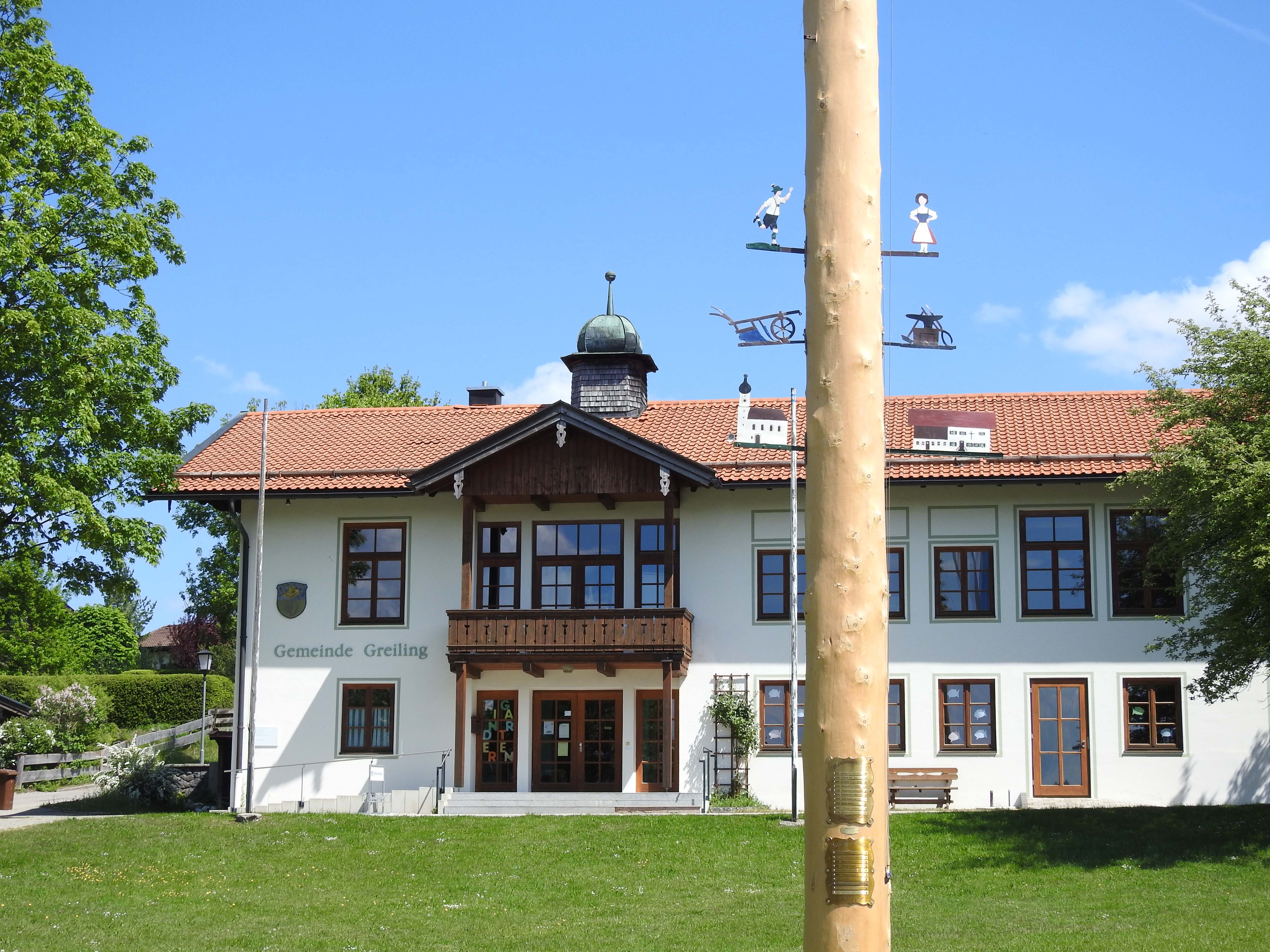
- Town hall

- Coat of arms

- Location of Greiling within Bad Tölz-Wolfratshausen district
- Interactive map of Greiling
- Location within Germany Location within Bavaria
- Coordinates: 47°46′N 11°37′E
- Country: Germany
- State: Bavaria
- Admin. region: Oberbayern
- District: Bad Tölz-Wolfratshausen
- Municipal assoc.: Reichersbeuern

Government
  - Mayor (2020–26): Anton Margreiter (FW)

Area
  - Total: 7.65 km^{2} (2.95 sq mi)
- Elevation: 706 m (2,316 ft)

Population (2025-12-31)
  - Total: 1,482
  - Density: 194/km^{2} (502/sq mi)
- Time zone: UTC+01:00 (CET)
  - Summer (DST): UTC+02:00 (CEST)
- Postal codes: 83677
- Dialling codes: 08041
- Vehicle registration: TÖL
- Website: http://www.gemeinde-greiling.de/

Greiling is a municipality in the district of Bad Tölz-Wolfratshausen in Bavaria in Germany.
