= Penzberg =

- Town
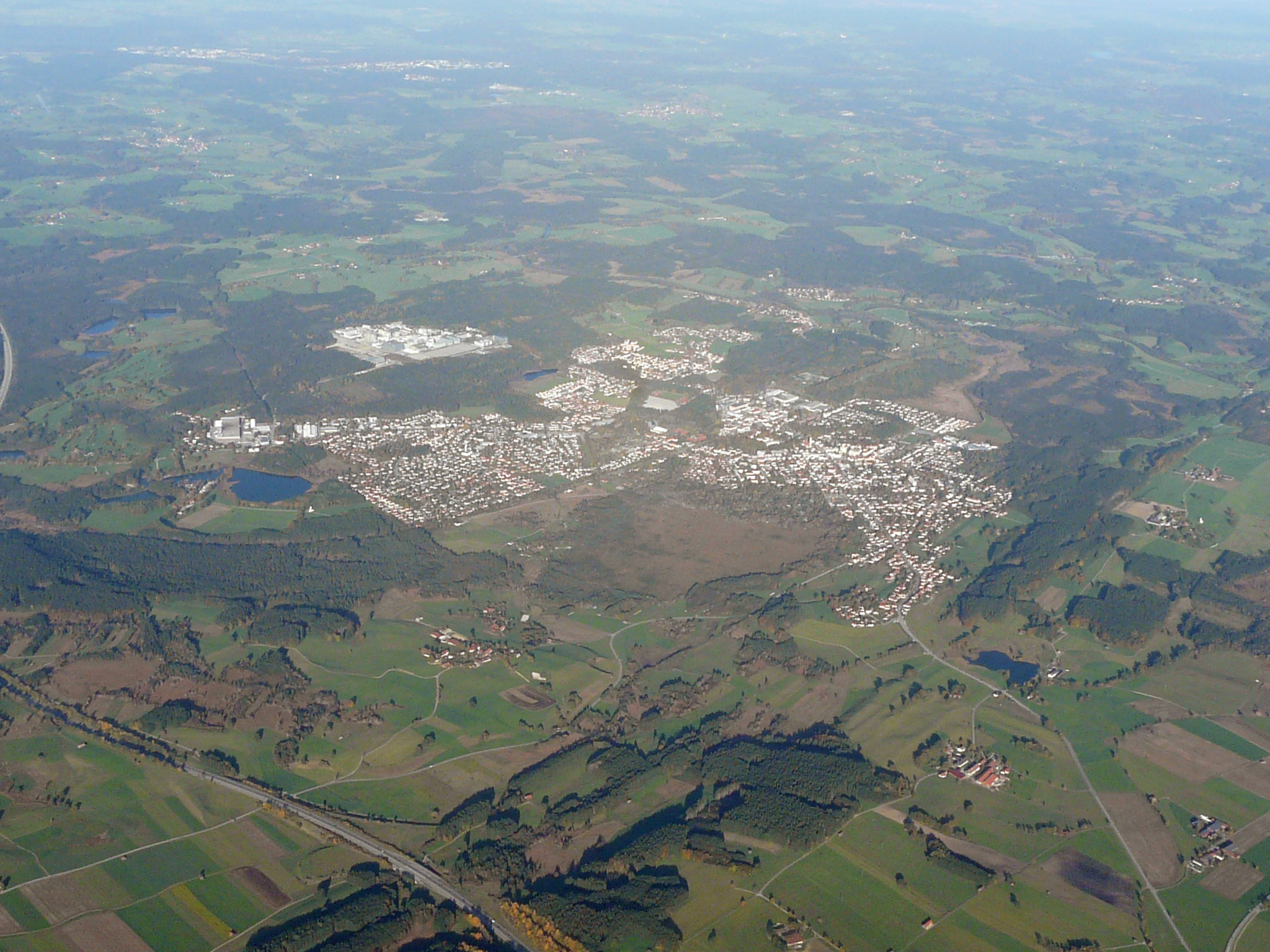
- Aerial view of Penzberg from the southwest

- Coat of arms

- Location of Penzberg within Weilheim-Schongau district
- Interactive map of Penzberg
- Location within Germany Location within Bavaria
- Coordinates: 47°45′N 11°23′E
- Country: Germany
- State: Bavaria
- Admin. region: Upper Bavaria
- District: Weilheim-Schongau

Government
  - Mayor (2020–26): Stefan Korpan (CSU)

Area
  - Total: 25.73 km^{2} (9.93 sq mi)
- Elevation: 596 m (1,955 ft)

Population (2025-12-31)
  - Total: 17,246
  - Density: 670.3/km^{2} (1,736/sq mi)
- Time zone: UTC+01:00 (CET)
  - Summer (DST): UTC+02:00 (CEST)
- Postal codes: 82377
- Dialling codes: 08856
- Vehicle registration: WM
- Website: www.penzberg.de

Penzberg (German pronunciation: [ˈpɛntsˌbɛʁk]; Central Bavarian: Benschberg) is a city (although some see it as a town) in the Weilheim-Schongau district, in Bavaria, Germany. It is located about 50 km south of Munich, and had a population of around 17,000 in 2020. A historic coal mining town, Penzberg today is known for its pharmaceutical industries.

== History ==
The settlement was first mentioned as Poennesperch in a 1275 contract, when it was sold to the Benediktbeuern Abbey. Surface coal mining had already started in the 16th century, though it was ended by the Thirty Years' War and the industrial exploitation of coal did not begin until 1800. In 1919 Penzberg received town privileges.

=== World War 2 ===
An allied air raid on 16 November 1944 severely damaged the town, including the parish church, but did not affect the local coal mine, the heart of the town's economic life.

In order to follow Hitler's "scorched earth" policy (Nero Decree), the local Nazi leaders wanted to blow up the coal mine which was the economic life blood of the town (The End: Hitler's Germany 1944–45 by Ian Kershaw – p344), so, on 28 April 1945 Hans Rummer (the social democratic mayor of Penzberg until the Nazi takeover in 1933) and others deposed the Nazi mayor. However, it was not long before the officer commanding a local Wehrmacht unit had the leaders of the revolt arrested. When, on the evening of the same day, Gauleiter Paul Giesler heard about the incident, he gave orders that the leaders were to be shot immediately without trial. To achieve this, a Werwolf group, around 100 strong, was dispatched, storming the town hall. They arrested and shot Rummer and seven fellows. During the night, a further eight suspected resistance fighters were hanged by a "drumhead court-martial" under SA brigade leader Hans Zöberlein. Among the victims were two women, one of them pregnant. The very next day, the Americans arrived. The massacre is known as the Penzberger Mordnacht (Night of Penzberg Murder). The mine was not destroyed, and remained open until 1966 when it closed for economic reasons; the adjacent power plant was also shut down in 1971.

== Transport ==
The town is served by Penzberg station on the Kochelsee Railway.

== Important buildings ==
- Post office by Robert Vorhoelzer in the then dominant "Heimatstil", 1922–1923

== Notable people ==
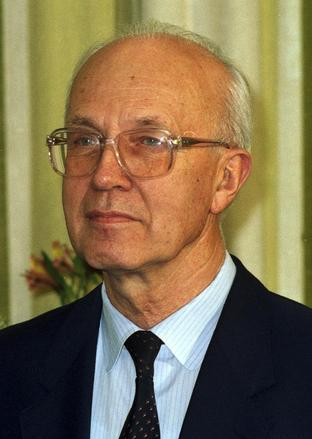
Helmut Schlesinger

- Verena Eberle (born 1950), former German swimmer
- Ludwig Kögl (born 1966), soccer players including FC Bayern Munich and TSV 1860 München
- Max Kruse (author) (1921-2015), children's books author ( Urmel aus dem Eis )
- Norbert Reithofer (born 1956), former chairman of the board of managing directors and current supervisory board of BMW
- Helmut Schlesinger (1924–2024), former president of the Bundesbank
- Jochen Schümann (born 1954), sailor and winner of the America's Cup with
- Karl Wald (1916-2011), football matchmaker and inventor of the penalty shoot-out
- Klaus Wolfermann (born 1946), former German athletic track (spearhead)
