= Bad Tölz-Wolfratshausen =

Coordinates: 47°45′N 11°35′E

- District
- Flag Coat of arms
- Country: Germany
- State: Bavaria
- Adm. region: Upper Bavaria
- Capital: Bad Tölz

Government
  - District admin.: Josef Niedermaier (FW)

Area
  - Total: 1,111 km^{2} (429 sq mi)

Population (31 December 2025)
  - Total: 130,081
  - Density: 117.1/km^{2} (303.2/sq mi)
- Time zone: UTC+01:00 (CET)
  - Summer (DST): UTC+02:00 (CEST)
- Vehicle registration: TÖL, WOR
- Website: www.lra-toelz.de

Bad Tölz-Wolfratshausen (Bavarian: Bad Däiz-Woifradshausn) is a Landkreis (district) in Bavaria, Germany. It is bounded by (from the south and clockwise) Austria and the districts of Garmisch-Partenkirchen, Weilheim-Schongau, Starnberg, Munich and Miesbach.

== History ==
The district was established in 1972 by merging the former districts of Bad Tölz and Wolfratshausen. Bad Tölz-Wolfratshausen has two castles, Castle Hohenburg and Seeburg (Münsing).

== Geography ==
Bad Tölz-Wolfratshausen is one of the alpine districts on the German-Austrian borders. The valley of the Upper Isar River separates the Bavarian Alps from the Karwendel, a portion of the Alps mainly located in Austria. The highest peak of the district is the Schafreuter (2,100 m).

The Isar River enters the district in the southwest and runs northwards, passing the two main towns of the district, Bad Tölz and Wolfratshausen. In the high alpine south there are several mountain lakes: Walchensee (16 km^{2}), Kochelsee (6 km^{2}) and Sylvensteinsee (an artificial lake in the course of the Isar River). In the northwest the district borders on Lake Starnberg (Starnberger See).

== Coat of arms ==
The coat of arms displays:

- the heraldic lion of the medieval county of Wolfratshausen
- the blue and white checkered pattern of Bavaria
- the staffs symbolising the famous Benediktbeuern Abbey

== Towns and municipalities ==
Clickable map of towns and municipalities in the district

Towns
1. Bad Tölz
2. Geretsried
3. Wolfratshausen
Municipalities
1. Bad Heilbrunn
2. Dietramszell
3. Egling
4. Eurasburg
5. Gaißach
6. Icking

7. Jachenau
8. Königsdorf
9. Lenggries
10. Münsing
11. Wackersberg

Verwaltungsgemeinschaften
1. Benediktbeuern; 1. Benediktbeuern^{1}; 2. Bichl	2. Kochel am See; 1. Kochel^{1}; 2. Schlehdorf	3. Reichersbeuern; 1. Greiling; 2. Reichersbeuern^{1}; 3. Sachsenkam
^{1}seat of the Verwaltungsgemeinschaft

== Museums ==
- Erinnerungsort Badehaus (Remembrance Place Badehaus)
