= Bad Heilbrunn =

- Municipality
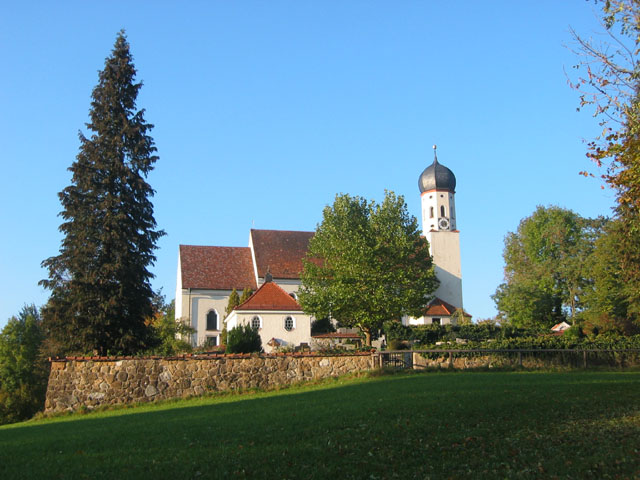
- Parish Church of Saint Kilian

- Coat of arms

- Location of Bad Heilbrunn within Bad Tölz-Wolfratshausen district
- Interactive map of Bad Heilbrunn
- Location within Germany Location within Bavaria
- Coordinates: 47°45′N 11°27′E
- Country: Germany
- State: Bavaria
- Admin. region: Oberbayern
- District: Bad Tölz-Wolfratshausen
- Subdivisions: 34 Ortsteile

Government
  - Mayor (2020–26): Thomas Gründl (CSU)

Area
  - Total: 40.32 km^{2} (15.57 sq mi)
- Elevation: 682 m (2,238 ft)

Population (2025-12-31)
  - Total: 3,854
  - Density: 95.59/km^{2} (247.6/sq mi)
- Time zone: UTC+01:00 (CET)
  - Summer (DST): UTC+02:00 (CEST)
- Postal codes: 83670
- Dialling codes: 08046
- Vehicle registration: TÖL
- Website: www.bad-heilbrunn.de

Bad Heilbrunn is a municipality in the district of Bad Tölz-Wolfratshausen in Bavaria in Germany.
