= Sebastian Horn =

German musician (born 1970)

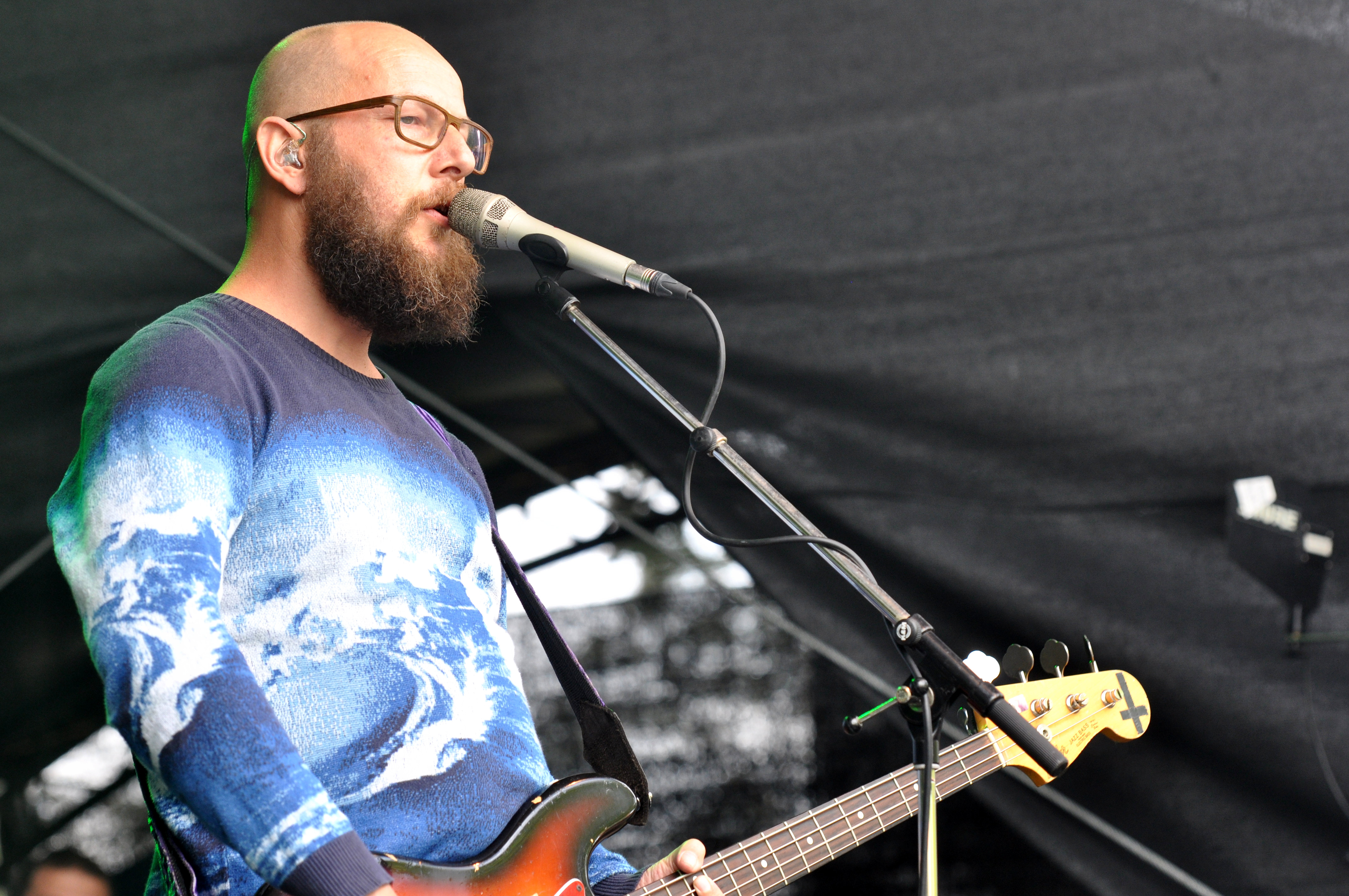

Background information
- Born: 2 December 1970 (age 55); Bad Tölz, Germany
- Genres: Alternative rock, folk
- Occupations: musician, songwriter, writer, television personality
- Instruments: vocals, bass guitar
- Years active: 1986–present

Sebastian Horn (born December 2, 1970) is a German musician and television presenter.

Horn is best known as the bassist and singer of the Bad Tölzer band Bananafishbones, which he founded in 1987 together with Florian Rein and Thomas Dill.

== Life ==
Horn grew up in Bad Tölz, Germany, where he was associated with the punk and black music scenes.

Following the formation of Bananafishbones in 1987, his brother Peter Horn Jr. went on to replace co-founder Thomas Dill in the band. Concurrent to the band's early years, Horn studied biology with a major in systematic botany at university.

After a few years in which the band mainly played live, in 1998 their song "Come to Sin" was featured in a commercial for the store C&A, leading to major success and recognition for the group.

Together with Leonhard Schwarz, Horn is responsible for the music aired for radio plays in the Ritter Trenk series by Jumbo Neue Medien & Verlag. Horn has also served as presenter for Heimsatsound, a television programme broadcast on Bayerisches Fernsehen, since 2014.

In addition to Bananafishbones, Horn founded the musical duo Dreiviertelblut in 2013, with Gerd Baumann, which released an album titled Lieder vom Unterholz via Millaphon Records. Since 2013 Baumann and Horn have written lyrics for the singspiel about strong beer tapping on the Nockherberg.

== Private life ==
Horn is married and, after residing in Munich for a few years with his wife, they returned to Bad Tölz with their five children.

== Discography ==
=== With Bananafishbones ===
Studio and live album releases
Year	Title
1995	Grey Test Hits
1997	Live & Unplugged
1999	Viva Conputa
2000	My Private Rainbow
2002	A Town Called Seven
2003	Live in Buchloe (with the Tölzer Stadtkapelle)
2004	36 m^{2}
2007	When You Pass By
2012	12 Songs In One Day
2013	Best Of 1998-2013
2015	Live & Unplugged in the Tölzer Kurhaus

=== With Dreiviertelblut ===
2014: Lieder aus dem Unterholz (Millaphon Records/Broken Silence)

2016: Finsterlieder (Millaphon Records)

=== Radio Plays ===
2011: Der kleine Ritter Trenk (Original Radio Play for the ZDF-Series)

== Filmography ==
- 1997: Easy Day (Kurzfilm)
- 2006: Die wilden Kerle 3
- 2011: Die Tote im Moorwald (Fernsehfilm)
- 2011: Sommer in Orange
- 2015: Heimatsound (Moderation)
- 2018: Lebenslinien – Wannst mitm Deifi tanzt (Dokumentarfilm)
- 2021: Zimmer mit Stall – Schwein gehabt (Fernsehreihe)

== Links ==
- Sebastian Horn discography at Discogs
- Sebastian Horn at IMDb
