= Seeshaupt =

- Municipality
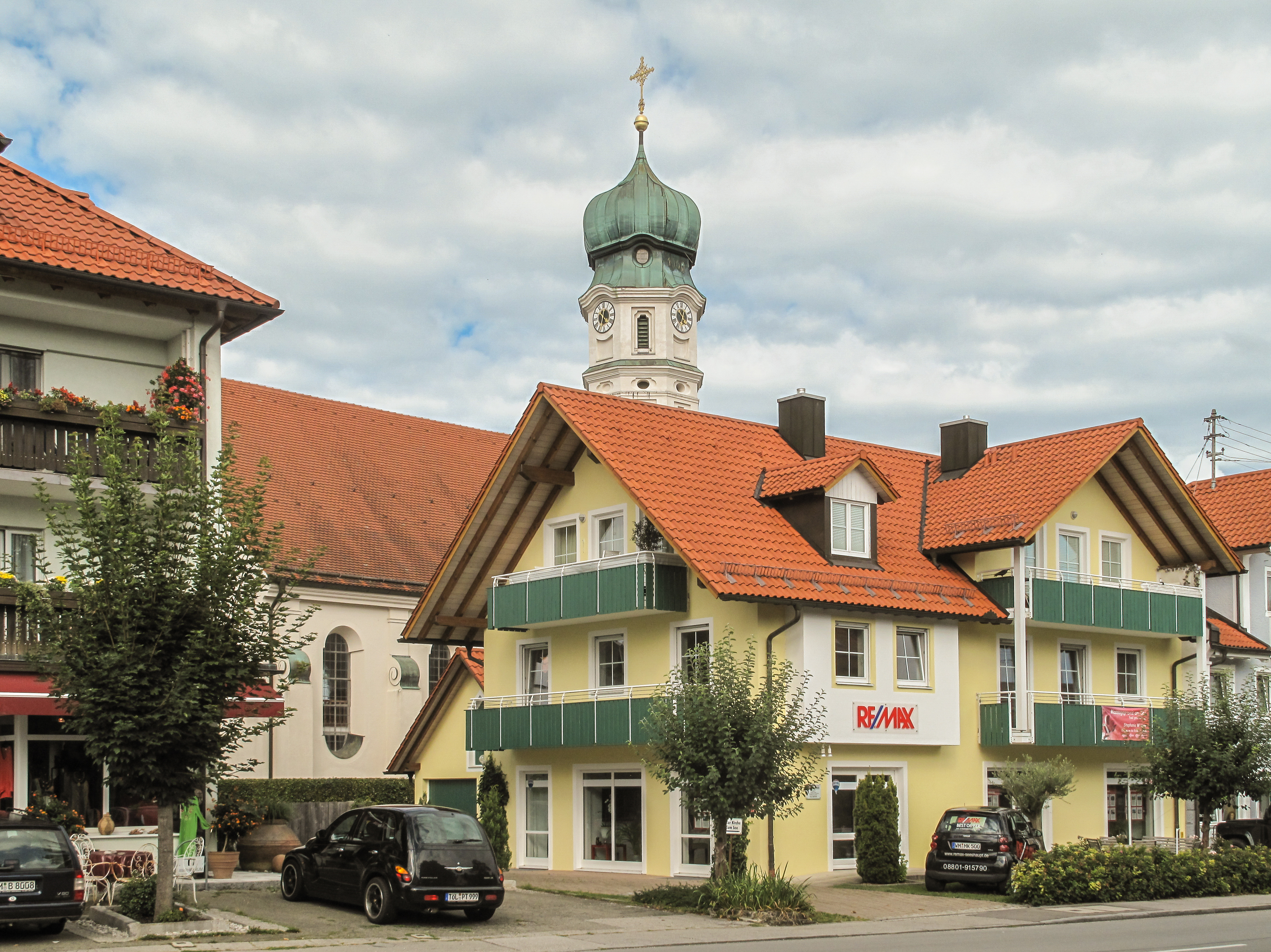
- Seeshaupt, St Michael Kirche, Churchtower

- Coat of arms

- Location of Seeshaupt within Weilheim-Schongau district
- Interactive map of Seeshaupt
- Location within Germany Location within Bavaria
- Coordinates: 47°49′28″N 11°18′03″E
- Country: Germany
- State: Bavaria
- Admin. region: Upper Bavaria
- District: Weilheim-Schongau
- Municipal assoc.: Seeshaupt

Government
  - Mayor (2020–26): Friedrich Egold (CSU)

Area
  - Total: 29.97 km^{2} (11.57 sq mi)
- Elevation: 597 m (1,959 ft)

Population (2025-12-31)
  - Total: 3,116
  - Density: 104.0/km^{2} (269.3/sq mi)
- Time zone: UTC+01:00 (CET)
  - Summer (DST): UTC+02:00 (CEST)
- Postal codes: 82402
- Dialling codes: 08801
- Vehicle registration: WM
- Website: www.seeshaupt.de

Seeshaupt is a municipality in the Weilheim-Schongau district, in Bavaria, Germany.

== Gallery ==
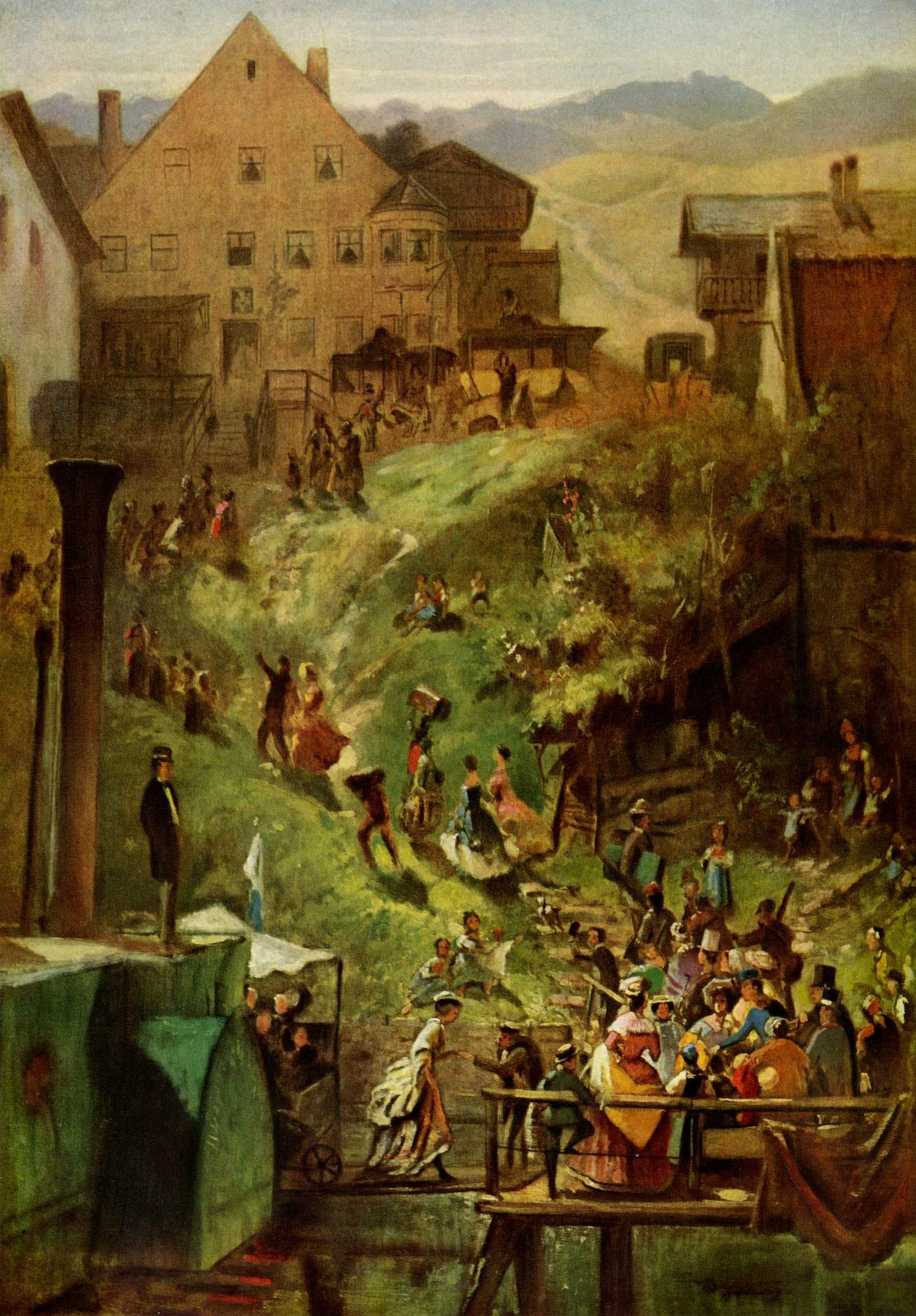
Ankunft in Seeshaupt, by Carl Spitzweg, c. 1880

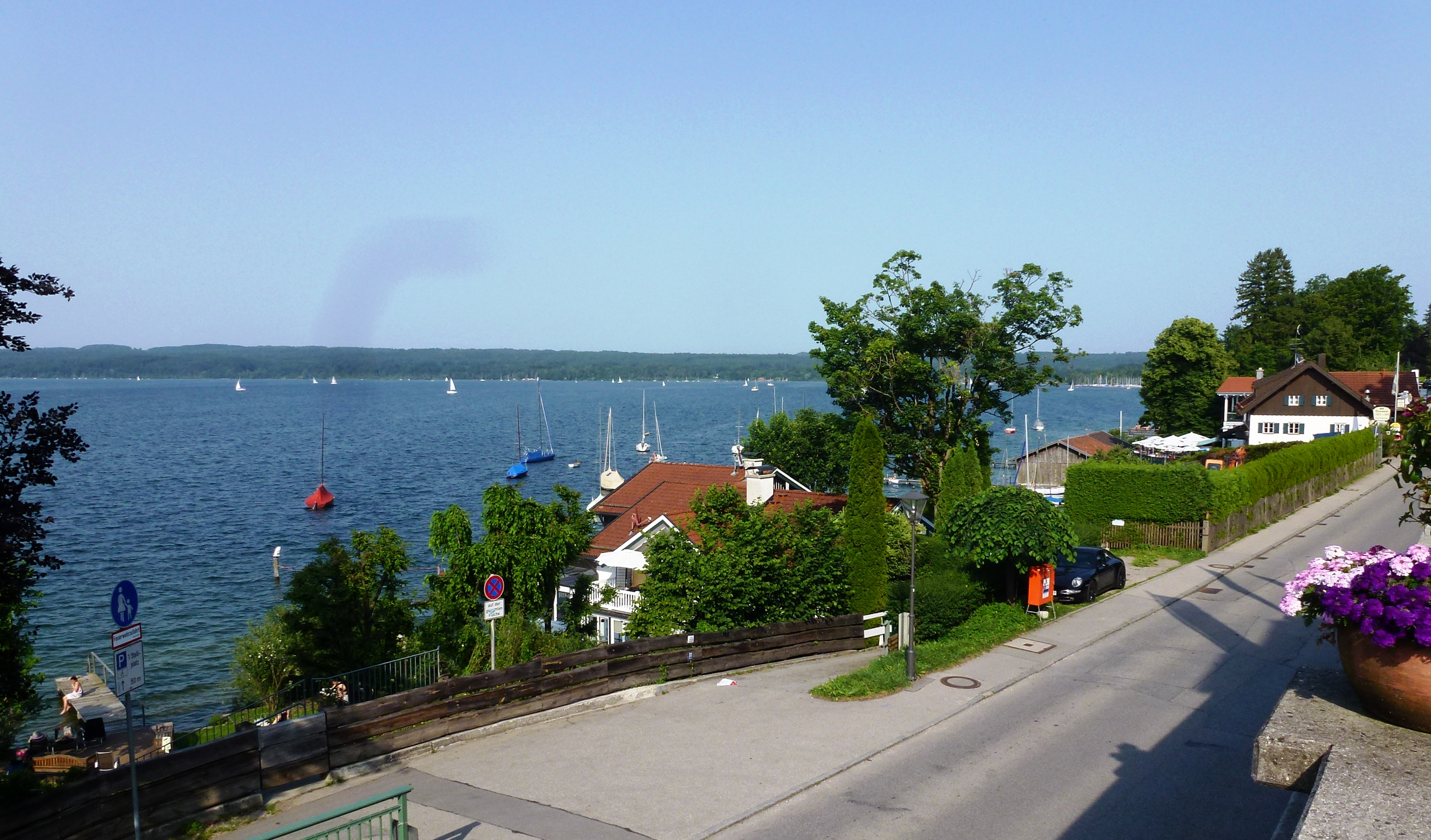
View from Seeshaupt to the Starnberger See
