= Kochel station =

Railway station in Bavaria

Kochel
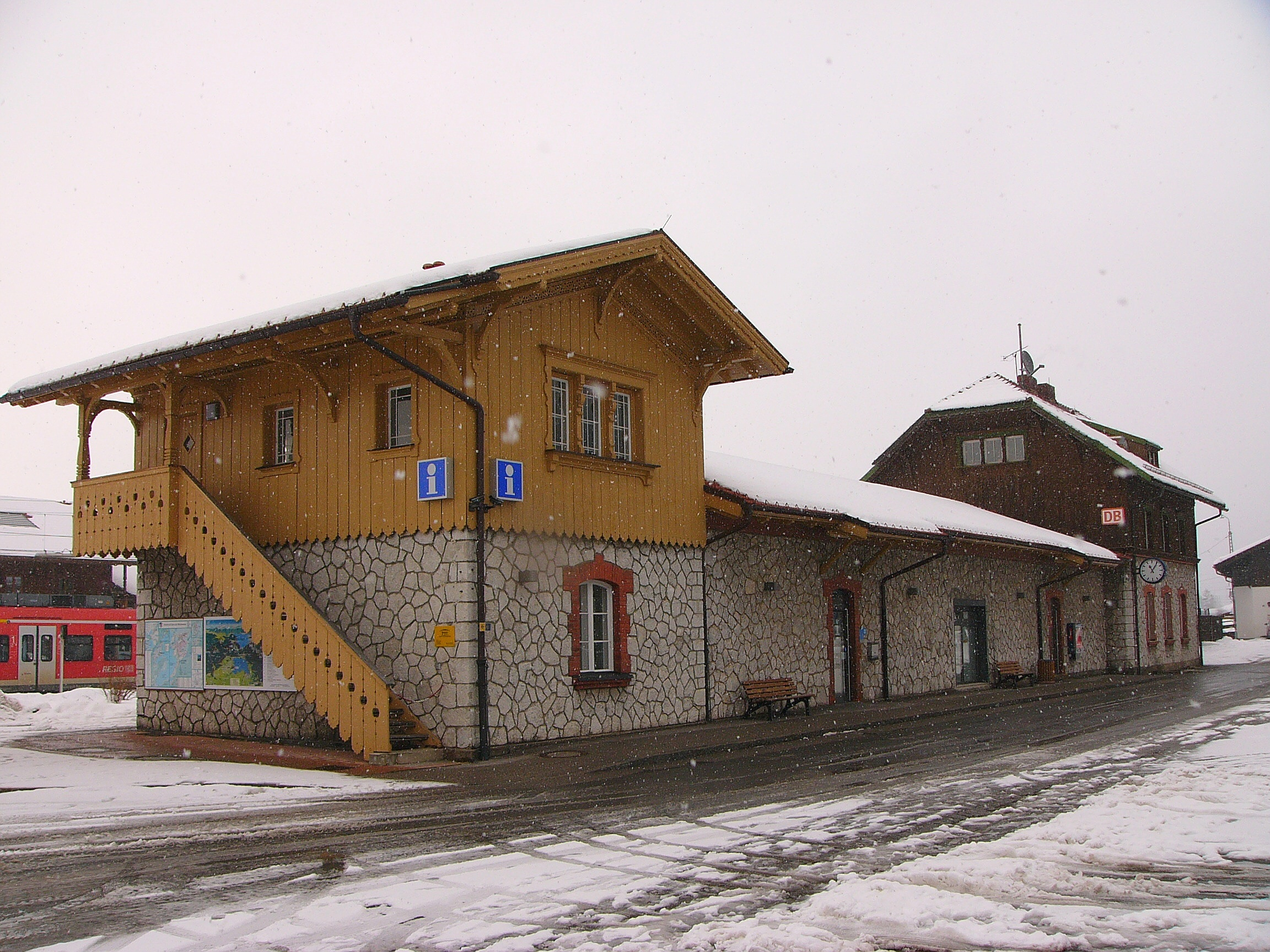
- The station building in 2013

General information
- Location: Kochel, Bavaria; Germany
- Coordinates: 47°39′38″N 11°22′16″E
- Owner: DB Netz
- Operator: DB Station&Service
- Lines: Kochelsee line (KBS 961)
- Distance: 35.5 km (22.1 mi) from Tutzing
- Platforms: 1 island platform
- Tracks: 2
- Train operators: DB Regio Bayern
- Connections: Regionalverkehr Oberbayern buses

Other information
- Station code: 3304
- DS100 code: MKCH
- IBNR: 8003355
- Category: 6

Services
| Preceding station | DB Regio Bayern | Following station |
|---|---|---|
| Terminus | RB 66 | Benediktbeuern towards München Hbf |
Location

Kochel station (German: Bahnhof Kochel) is a railway station in the municipality of Kochel, in Bavaria, Germany. It is located on the Kochelsee line of Deutsche Bahn.

== Services ==
As of the December 2021 timetable change, the following services stop at Kochel:

- RB: hourly service to München Hauptbahnhof.

== Others ==
The station was the primarely used filming location of the fictional train station Kalthenthal of the ARD sitcom Um Himmels Willen.
