= Kochelsee Railway =

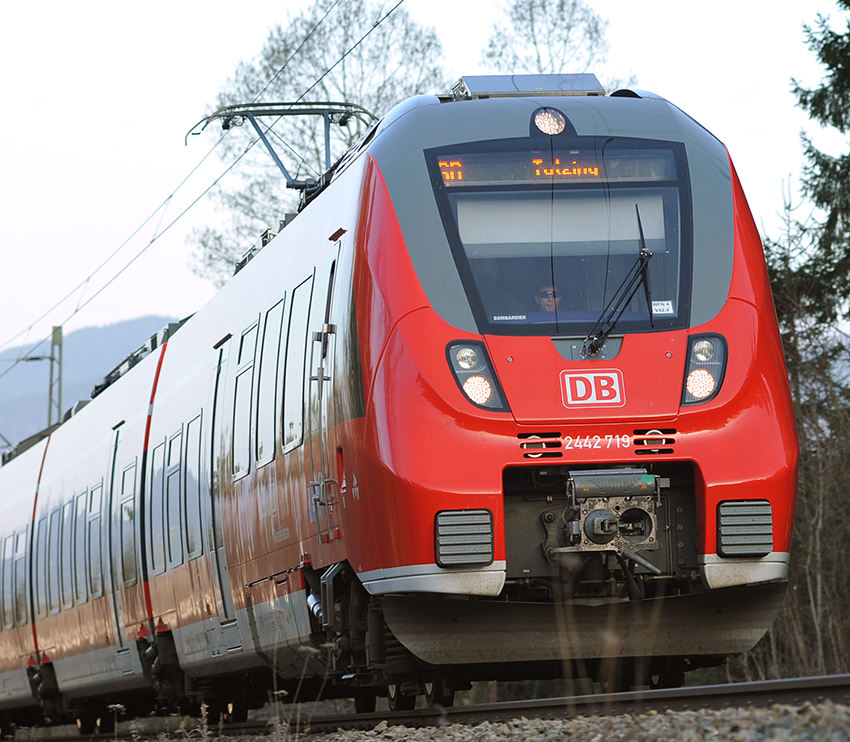
- A Talent on the Kochelsee railway

Overview
- Native name: Kochelseebahn
- Status: Operational
- Owner: Deutsche Bahn
- Line number: 5453
- Locale: Bavaria
- Termini: Tutzing; Kochel
- Stations: 7

Service
- Type: Heavy rail, Passenger rail Regional rail
- Route number: 961
- Operator(s): DB Bahn
- Rolling stock: Bombardier Talent 2

History
- Opened: Stages between 1865–1898

Technical
- Line length: 35.5 km (22.1 mi)
- Number of tracks: Single track
- Track gauge: 1,435 mm (4 ft 8 1/2 in) standard gauge
- Electrification: 15 kV/16.7 Hz AC Overhead line

The Kochelsee Railway (German: Kochelseebahn, literally "Lake Kochel Railway") is a branch line in Upper Bavaria (Oberbayern), Germany, that is just under 36 km long, single-tracked and fully electrified. It is operated by the Deutsche Bahn AG as route 961 in their List of German scheduled railway routes. The Kochelseebahn branches in Tutzing from the Munich Hauptbahnhof–Garmisch-Partenkirchen main line and runs from there via Penzberg to Kochel am See by the Kochelsee that gives the line its name.

The section from Tutzing to Bichl is classed as a main line, the remainder as a branch line. The route was electrified on 4 March 1925 and is currently (2006) worked by electric multiples of the DBAG Class 425/426.

Apart from a few exceptions in the morning commuter services the trains run hourly, with a crossing in Bichl shortly before the half-hour and good connections in Tutzing in both directions. The commuter services run straight through to and from Munich Hauptbahnhof (main station), the crossing then usually takes place in Seeshaupt due to the change in frequency.

== Stations ==
In a north-to-south order the line services stops in the following municipalities:

- Munich - Main station, northern terminus during "rush hours" (commuter traffic)
- Munich - Pasing
- Starnberg

These former three will be serviced during commuter traffic only. Such trains, headed northward to Munich may often be coupled with services reaching Tutzing via a more western line, servicing destinations as far south as Innsbruck (in Tyrol, Austria), Mittenwald or Garmisch. On their way down south towards Kochel they may be coupled off of such services. Otherwise, services start / terminate in Tutzing.

- Tutzing, northern terminus during the rest of the day and in the evenings
- Bernried
- Seeshaupt
- Iffeldorf, formerly "Staltach", after a stud near the station building
- Penzberg
- Bichl
- Benediktbeuern
- Kochel am See, southern terminus
