= Verband Forschender Arzneimittelhersteller =

Trade association of the German pharmaceutical industry

Verband Forschender Arzneimittelhersteller e.V.
- Founded: 1994
- Type: registered society
- Purpose: Political advocacy for pharmaceutical companies in Germany
- Location: Berlin, Hausvogteiplatz 13
- Region served: national
- Members: 43 drug companies (2017)
- Key people: Han Steutel (BMS), Frank Schöning (Bayer), Hagen Pfundner (Roche) and others
- Website: www.vfa.de

The Verband Forschender Arzneimittelhersteller (vfa) or Association of Research-Based Pharmaceutical Companies, is the trade group of 43 pharmaceutical companies in Germany which are global players, representing more than two-thirds of the German pharmaceutical market, with nearly 80,000 employees in Germany.

In Germany more than 18,000 of their employees work in the field of research and development of pharmaceuticals. The vfa's focus has been on political consulting and public relations on the national and EU-level.

== History ==
The Verband Forschender Arzneimittelhersteller, or Association of Research-Based Pharmaceutical Companies, was founded in 1994 with headquarters in Berlin as an Eingetragener Verein. It is the German or trade group for global players in the pharmaceutical industry.

=== Difference to the other three trade groups ===
Mid to small sized pharmaceutical companies in Germany are represented by the Bundesverband der Pharmazeutischen Industrie (BPI).

Another pharmaceutical industry association in Germany, the Bundesverband der Arzneimittelhersteller ("German Medicines Manufacturers' Association", BAH), has about 450 company members including traditional pharmaceutical manufacturers of OTC drugs and biotechnological products plus about 150 other members with a business interest in healthcare, such as publishers and polling organizations.

The third group is "Pro Generika", founded in 2004 in Berlin. As of 2017 it represents 20 member companies and is the only trade association focusing on generic drugs, which cover 77% of the pharmaceutical needs of the Germany's statutory health insurance.

The former "Deutscher Generikaverband" in Berlin, founded in 1986, dissolved in 2012 because of dwindling membership.

== Function ==
The vfa's focus has been on lobbying, political consulting and public relations on the national and international level.

The vfa claims, that with a manufacturer's share of 50 percent of the retail price, Germany ranks at the bottom in the European comparison. As of 2013 the prescription drug price in Germany consisted of reimbursement to manufacturer (50%), wholesaler (4%), retailing pharmacies (14%) and taxes and discounts amounting to 32% of the end price, the highest such rate in Europe per vfa, EFPIA and Pharmaceutical associations of European countries.

For the first time in their 22-year history, vfa companies disclosed how much they paid physicians and other HCW's, medical organizations and medical facilities in June 2016. They sent their data to the "Freiwillige Selbstkontrolle Arzneimittel" (FSA), which publishes aggregate data together with other non-vfa companies who adhere to voluntary transparency. They planned to continue once a year, with data available for 3 years. In 2015, 71.000 physicians received 575 Million Euros, and only one third agreed to publication of their name.

=== Organization ===
The vfa publishes leading members in their "fotoarchive", with Birgit Fischer as managing director, but no other organizational details like employee figures or operating expenses.

As of July 2017 the vfa's latest statistics are in a 2015 downloadable publication, which contains mostly general PR.

== Members ==
As of 2010, the vfa represented 43 German pharmaceutical companies and biotech companies with about 80,000 employees, including the following eight largest global pharmaceutical companies with 2014 pharmaceutical sales in brackets: Novartis (51.3B$), Pfizer (44.9B$), Sanofi (40B$), Roche (37.6B$), Merck (36.6B$), Johnson&Johnson (36.4B$), AstraZeneca (33.3B$) and GlaxoSmithKline (31.5B$). Their 2014 sales have decreased due to corporate mergers and patent expiration, according to the vfa. In 2015, there were 265 pharmaceutical companies per The Federal Statistical Office.

The vfa members are:

- Amgen
- AbbVie Inc. Deutschland, 2013 spin-off of Abbott Laboratories
- Actelion Pharmaceuticals Deutschland GmbH
- Aegerion Pharmaceuticals GmbH
- Astellas Pharma GmbH
- AstraZeneca GmbH
- Baxter Deutschland GmbH
- Bayer AG
- Berlin Chemie AG
- bioCSL GmbH
- Biogen GmbH
- Bristol-Myers Squibb GmbH & Co. KGaA
- C.H. Boehringer Sohn / Ingelheim
- Daiichi Sankyo Deutschland GmbH
- Eisai (company) GmbH
- GlaxoSmithKline GmbH & Co. KG
- Grünenthal GmbH
- Ipsen GroupPharma GmbH
- Janssen-Cilag GmbH
- Lilly Pharma Holding GmbH
- Lundbeck GmbH
- MediGene AG
- Merck KGaA
- Merck & Co named MSD Sharp & Dohme on vfa website
- Mundipharma GmbH
- Novartis PHARMA GmbH Nürnberg
- Novo Nordisk Pharma GmbH
- Otsuka Pharma GmbH
- Pfizer Deutschland GmbH
- Roche Deutschland Holding GmbH
- Sanofi-Aventis Deutschland
- Swedish Orphan Biovitrum GmbH
- Takeda Deutschland
- UCB (company) GmbH
- Vifor Deutschland GmbH
- ViiV Healthcare GmbH

== Controversies ==
In 2010, the vfa and the BPI were listed as the most powerful lobby groups for the pharmaceutical sector in Germany.

== See also ==
- Association of the British Pharmaceutical Industry (UK)
- Pharmaceutical Research and Manufacturers of America (US)
