= Bundesverband der Pharmazeutischen Industrie =

Bundesverband der Pharmazeutischen Industrie e.V.
- Founded: 1951
- Type: Registered society
- Purpose: Political advocacy for the pharmaceutical industry
- Location: Berlin
- Region served: national and international
- Members: around 240 drug companies (2022)
- Key people: Martin Zentgraf
- Employees: around 70,000 (2022)
- Website: www.bpi.de

The Bundesverband der Pharmazeutischen Industrie (BPI), founded after WWII with headquarters in Berlin, is a German Non-profit association and trade group for Small and medium-sized enterprises in the pharmaceutical industry. As of 2022 it represented 240 classic pharmaceutical companies, pharmaceutical service providers, biotech companies, herbal medicines and homeopathy/anthroposophy with altogether approximately 78,000 employees. BPI´s focus has been on political consulting and public relations on the EU-level in order to enhance development in the national and international health care systems.

== History ==
The Bundesverband der Pharmazeutischen Industrie (BPI) was founded after WWII with headquarters in Berlin as an Eingetragener Verein. It is the German industry association or trade group for a broad spectrum of companies in the pharmaceutical industry. BPI works

Large pharmaceutical companies in Germany are represented by the Verband Forschender Arzneimittelhersteller ("Association of Research-Based Pharmaceutical Companies", vfa).

Another pharmaceutical industry association in Germany, the Bundesverband der Arzneimittelhersteller ("German Medicines Manufacturers' Association", BAH), has about 450 company members including 150 traditional pharmaceutical manufacturers and about 150 other members with a business interest in healthcare, such as publishers and polling organizations.

The philosophy of BPI begins with the health of man and works towards enhancing the health care system to become more future-oriented. The company works towards this goal by aiding and consulting in several aspects of pharmaceutical and medical device development and improving market chances.

== Function ==
BPI´s focus has been on political consulting and public relations on the EU-level. BPI headquarters is located in Berlin. There is also an office in Brussels.

The BDI offers competencies in:
- Drug safety
- Biotechnology
- Disinfection
- Homoeopathy / Anthroposophy
- Innovation and research
- Clinical research
- Communication / Public relations
- Business development
- Phytopharmacology
- Politics
- Law
- Self-medication / Over the counter
- Drug approval, both national and EU-wide

== Members ==
As of 2017, the BPI represented about 250 German Large to medium to small pharmaceutical companies and biotech companies with altogether about 78,000 employees.

Among the BPI's members are:

- 3M ESPE
- Aeterna Zentaris
- Amicus Therapeutics
- B. Braun Melsungen
- Baker & McKenzie
- Camurus
- Celgene
- Fraunhofer-Gesellschaft
- Fresenius SE & Co. KGaA
- Gilead Sciences
- Guerbet
- Horizon Pharma
- LEO Pharma
- Miltenyi Biotec
- Mitsubishi Tanabe Pharma
- Northwest Biotherapeutics
- Novartis Pharma
- Orion Pharma
- Shionogi
- Stallergenes
- Zambon

== Controversies ==
In 2008, the BPI was found to run a portal claiming to represent self-help support groups, while it propagated pharma industry interests.

In 2010, the BPI and the vfa were listed as the most powerful lobby groups for the pharma sector in Germany.

== See also ==
- Association of the British Pharmaceutical Industry (UK)
- Pharmaceutical Research and Manufacturers of America (US)
