= Feodor-Lynen-Gymnasium Planegg =

Feodor-Lynen-Gymnasium
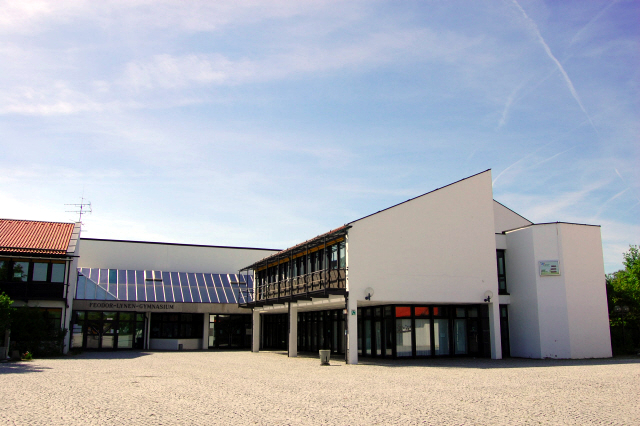

Location
- Feodor-Lynen-Str. 2; 82152 Planegg; Munich district Bavaria; Germany
- 48°6′18″N 11°26′4″E

Information
- Type: Gymnasium
- Motto: Erstes und letztes Ziel unserer Didaktik soll es sein, die Unterrichtsweise aufzuspüren und zu erkunden, bei welcher der Lehrer weniger zu lehren braucht, die Schüler dennoch mehr lernen, in den Schulen weniger Lärm, Überdruss und unnütze Mühe herrsche, dafür mehr Freiheit, Vergnügen und wahrhafter Fortschritt. by John Amos Comenius in Didactica Magna, 1632
- Founded: 1977 (school); 1981 (building)
- Headmaster: Matthias Spohrer
- Staff: 74
- Enrollment: 992
- Language: German
- Website: flg-online.de

The Feodor-Lynen-Gymnasium Planegg (in short FLG or Feo) is a government secondary school in Planegg in the German state of Bavaria. It belongs to the mathematical-scientific category of gymnasia but also has an economic educational branch. In 2022–23, 992 pupils attended the FLG, with a staff of approximately 74.

== Location and traffic connections ==
The school is located in the eastern part of the municipality of Planegg on Feodor-Lynen-Street. The school can be reached via various MVV bus lines from the Planegg Friedhof stop on Münchner Straße. At the beginning of the year 2017 the lines 266 (Klinikum Großhadern – Planegg), 260 (Fürstenried West – Germering-Unterpfaffenhofen) and 936 (Fürstenried-West – Gauting) stop here. With the bus lines 266 and 260 there is a connection to the Munich S-Bahn or the Munich U-Bahn. In addition, both Neuried and Martinsried are connected by separate cycle paths.

== School ==
=== Naming ===
The Feodor-Lynen-Gymnasium in Planegg was named after the biochemist and Nobel Prize winner Feodor Lynen. Initially, the name Würmtal-Gymnasium was considered, but a naming after a regionally anchored person was preferred. Thereupon two important Planegg figures ran for the name of the Gymnasium, on the one hand Feodor Lynen, who worked at the Max Planck Institute of Biochemistry for a long time and lived in Planegg, on the other hand the Bavarian comedian Karl Valentin, who lived and is buried in Planegg. In 1980, a committee agreed on Feodor Lynen. The new building complex of the Feodor-Lynen-Gymnasium was finally inaugurated on July 6, 1981.

=== History ===
In the 1970s, in the gymnasia of the surrounding towns, such as Gräfelfing and Gauting, the capacity limits were reached, which is why an additional secondary educational institution should be built in the Würmtal. For this, parents sat down already in the autumn of 1972 with the founding of the "Förderverein Weiterführender Schulen Planegg-Krailling". Five years later, in September 1977, the Bavarian ministry of education and the arts approved on the base of an initiative of the local sponsoring association (Förderverein), the first day of school took place in the buildings of the elementary and general school in Krailling. The construction of the school building in Planegg started in 1979. In 1980 the school was named after the biochemist Feodor Lynen. The new building was moved in the same year. The completion and inauguration of the first construction phase took place in 1981, and a year later the topping-out ceremony for the second construction phase was celebrated. In 1984, the extension was inaugurated and two years later, the first high school graduation was completed. The building complex experienced in the 1990s, 2000s and 2020s, various extensions, such as an extension on the north side of the "old" building and the so-called L-shaped construction with the Kupferhaus. In addition, in 1995, the school was equipped with Solar panels on the roof, which was expanded in the years of 2003 and 2006.

=== Architecture ===
==== Main building ====
Under the planning of the architectural office Heilmann & Kath and the then Neuried mayor Ladislaus Wolowicz, the school building was planned and built in 1980. The building falls under the architectural style of minimalism, which provides a simple language of forms and the abandonment of abstract decorative elements. The building was financed by the "Zweckverband Staatliches Gymnasium im Würmtal", which is made up of members of the association Neuried, Planegg, Krailling and the district of Munich.

==== Kupferhaus ====
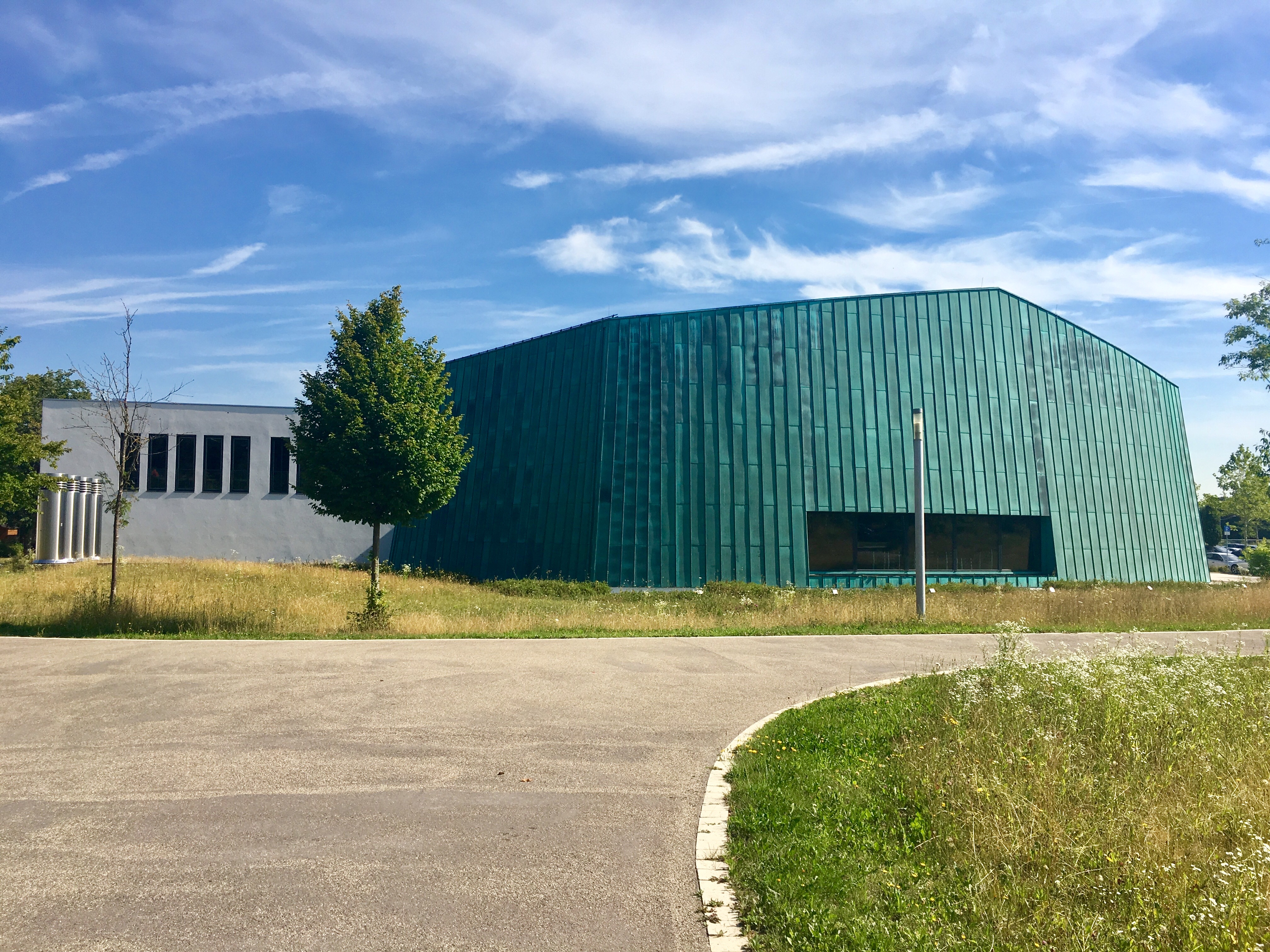
The Kupferhaus in 2019

The Kupferhaus (in English "copper house") was designed from 2005 to 2008 by the "Planungsbüro Rohling". Within the framework of an architectural competition its proposal emerged as the winner. The plot on which the Kupferhaus stands amounts to a total of 3,572 m^{2}. In addition to the concert hall, the building complex also includes classrooms and the school cafeteria. In addition to some school performances (plays and concerts), various cultural events take place in the Kupferhaus. The costs for the entire building complex amounted to 8.3 million Euros. The capacity of the concert hall is 450 seats.

==== Sports facilities ====
For physical education there are two triple gyms and an ice rink available. For the optional course sport climbing a climbing tower with a height of ten meters of the Friends of the Würmtal can be used. Opened in 2013, the skatepark at the Gymnasium offers an interesting place for skateboarding. A tartan track and a football pitch are used for educational purposes as well as by local sports clubs.

==== Future extension of the main building ====
To meet the increased space requirements with the introduction of the G9 (an additional school year (de)), a new building is planned north of the existing plant. The start of construction is scheduled for 2020. According to current plans, the three-storey building is not supposed to have any connection to the existing building and primarily accommodates middle classes. The non-cash contribution "Zweckverband Staatliches Gymnasium im Würmtal" assumes a total cost of about ten million Euros.

=== Reference grammar school of the Technical University of Munich (TUM) ===
The FLG is one of 50 reference grammar schools of the TUM School of Education and is therefore an interface between academic teacher training and teaching practice. The training and further education measures of the subject teachers concern in particular the MINT subjects (mathematics, computer science, natural sciences, technology).

=== Fields of education ===
First and foremost, the Feodor-Lynen-Gymnasium is a grammar school with a focus on natural sciences, technology and economics. When choosing the scientific-technological branch, chemistry is available from the 8th grade and more lessons in physics. If, on the other hand, one chooses the economic branch, one has economics and law from the 8th grade onwards and chemistry from the 9th grade onwards. The branch election takes place in the 7th class. The foreign language Spanish (late beginning) can be chosen from the 10th grade onwards and must be continued until the Abitur (school leaving/university entrance certificate). In the 5th and 6th grades, the so-called natural science class (NaWiKla) is offered in order to motivate the students for scientific questions. This includes, for example, excursions to the nearby Max Planck Institute for Biochemistry in Martinsried. In addition to the natural sciences class, there is the possibility of joining a music class in the 5th and 6th grades.

=== School life ===
==== Student council (SMV) ====
The SMV ("Schülermitverantwortung") consists of three pupils who are elected by the class representatives of all school classes at the beginning of each school year. At the FLG, there is an SMV since the foundation of the school. Since 2014/2015, there is a so-called "Mini-SMV", which represents the interests of the lower school classes. The SMV also includes the "technical team". The SMV enriches school life by organizing celebrations for the lower classes, ball tournaments or other activities such as fundraising for social projects such as the World AIDS Day at the FLG.

==== Student newspaper ====
The "Feo-Times" is the FLG's school newspaper, which is designed online in the form of a weblog. The pupils regularly write articles about current and internal school topics. It is possible to apply for editorial work via an elective subject.

==== Media attention ====
From June to October 2015, the Gymnasium, like many other schools in the district, hosted asylum seekers. In the course of this, one of the two triple sports venues was provisionally converted in order to accommodate a total of 200 refugees on a temporary basis. The refugees came mainly from Afghanistan and African countries such as Eritrea, Somalia, Mali, Nigeria and Senegal. On 6 October 2015, the emergency shelter was dissolved because the total number of refugees declined and other accommodation options were available. The majority of the 200 residents were relocated to the air dome in Unterhaching.

==== School trips ====
At the Feodor-Lynen-Gymnasium numerous school trips are carried out. Among other things a one-week school country home is organized for all pupils of the 5th classes. For the 7th classes a ski camp is offered. In addition to the ski course, the one-week programme includes lessons on avalanche and environmental science. In addition, further class trips are offered in certain optional subjects.

==== Student exchanges ====
The school offers various exchange programmes with different countries, whereby the European schools are located in the partner municipalities of Planegg. For the 8th and 9th grades there is a France exchange at the Collège des Buclos in Meylan. An exchange to the English Didcot is carried out every year for the ninth and tenth classes of the school. For interested 10th grade students there is also an exchange with Strath Haven High School in Wallingford, Pennsylvania. Since 2012, the FLG has also been a participant in the Comenius programme, which includes regular visits to various European partner schools.

==== Tutoring program ====
In order to make it easier for the younger pupils to enter school life, pupils in the 9th grade can apply for the post of tutor. In the first months they support the "newcomers" and try to strengthen the class community with many games and several meetings or to help with problems among the pupils. Furthermore, they accompany the assigned classes on hiking days and other school trips. From the 10th grade onwards, the tutor can be promoted to a "learning counsellor" who helps with the homework in the afternoon. All learning consultants complete a special internal school training twice a year.

==== Afternoon care ====
The afternoon care of the FLG offers working parents the opportunity to have their children looked after by appropriately trained learning consultants in the afternoon. This offer is only valid for pupils of the lower level. After class, the children are picked up by their tutors in the classroom and checked for attendance. Afterwards the pupils go closed with their learning advisors, depending upon weather conditions, into the gymnasium or on the sports field. There the children can play sports after a long day at school. Before the children do their homework in the afternoon, they go to the school canteen together. The afternoon care ends at 4 pm.

==== Technical equipment ====
The Feodor-Lynen-Gymnasium is equipped to a high standard: the entire main building has WLAN and the classic blackboard disappears in favour of interactive whiteboards. In almost every classroom, there are document cameras instead of conventional daylight projectors for projecting student results, for example. It is also possible for learning groups to take individual lessons or an iPad set for several days. A special feature are the iPad classes, which are offered from the 8th grade onwards in every grade. Each student has his or her own iPad, which is to some extent a substitute for the classic exercise book.

==== School medical service ====
At the Feodor-Lynen-Gymnasium, school paramedics volunteer their time for their classmates. In case of injuries or sudden illnesses, trained school paramedics are always on hand. The helpers all have at least one first-aid course, some of them trained as paramedics. The SSD is supported by the Planegg/Krailling readiness of the Bavarian Red Cross. The number of members of the school medical service varies - depending on the school year - between 20 and 30 members who attend grades 10 to 12. Pupils from the ninth grade onwards can join the medical service.

=== Optional teaching courses ===
The Feodor-Lynen-Gymnasium offers electives including musical courses such as the student choir and the school orchestra. There is also a wide range of sports activities such as ice hockey, basketball, tennis, sport climbing and triathlon. Since 2013 there has been a project called Feo Bees, which involves the breeding and care of several bee colonies. The produced Feo honey can be purchased in the school building. In addition, there is the elective subject Politics and Contemporary History as well as a reading club and a theatre course.

== Headmasters of the school ==
- Walter Rudlof (1977–1998)
- Monika Münkel (1998–2003)
- Brigitte Schmid-Breining (2003–2020)
- Matthias Spohrer (2020–)

== Notable former students ==
- Jasmin Tabatabai, actress and musician (Abitur 1986)
- Georg Fahrenschon, German politician and former Finance minister of Bavaria (Abitur 1988)
- Florian Gallenberger, film director, screenwriter and film producer, winner of the Academy Award for Best Live Action Short Film

== Literature ==
- Ladislaus Wolowicz: Feodor Lynen Grammar School on 6 July 1981. Pera-Druck, Gräfelfing 1981.
