= Tamara Turner =

American librarian and gay rights activist

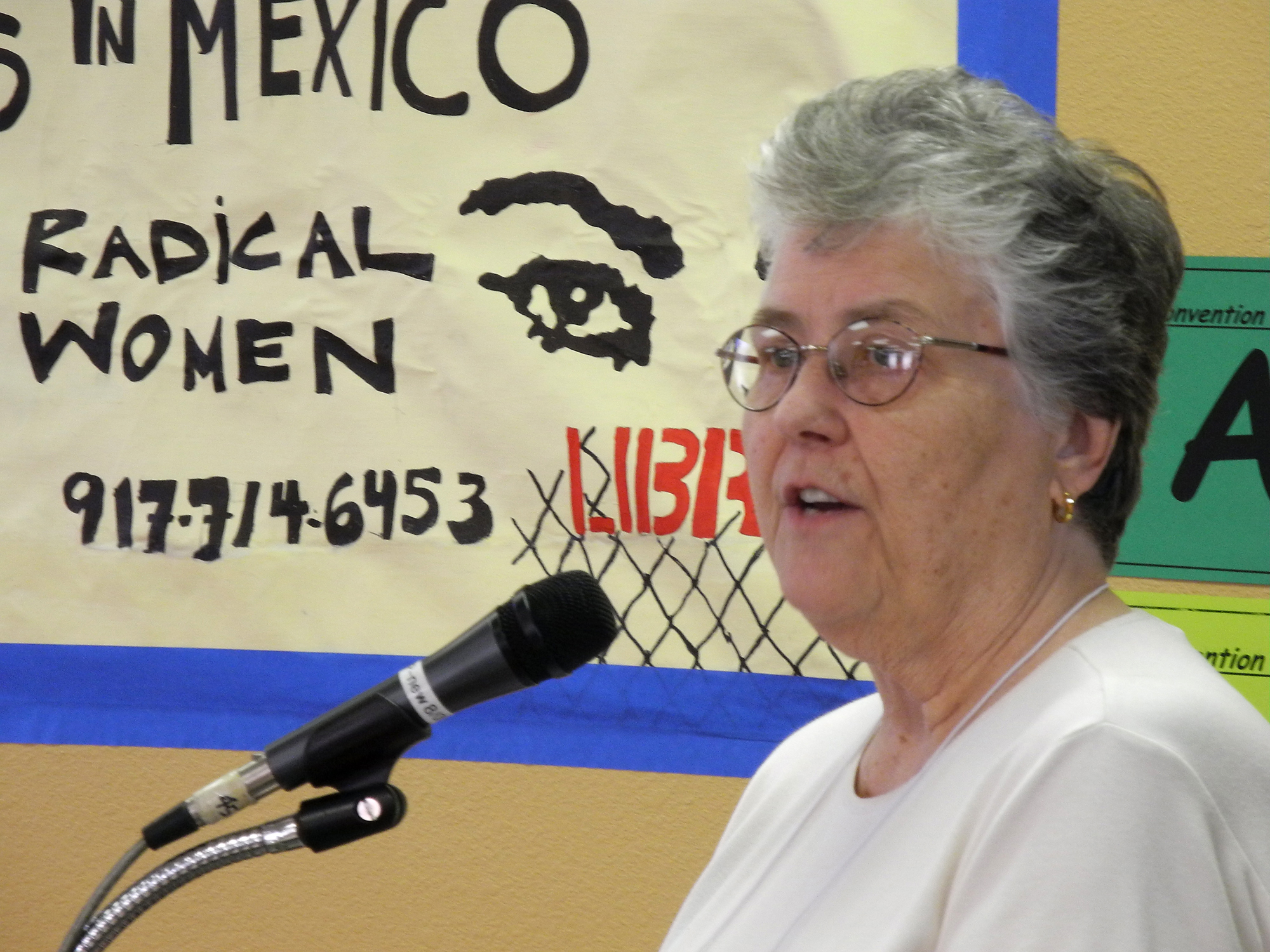
- Turner speaking at the 2014 Freedom Socialist Party convention in Los Angeles
- Born: March 27, 1940; Seattle, Washington, US
- Died: March 22, 2017 (aged 76); Seattle, Washington, US
- Education: University of Washington

Tamara Turner (March 27, 1940 – March 22, 2017) was an American librarian, gay liberation pioneer, and activist for labor rights. Her work in the Freedom Socialist Party and its sister organization Radical Women strove to implement the ideals of socialism and feminism.

== Early life and education ==
Tamara A. Turner was born March 27, 1940, and raised by a single mother in Seattle, Washington. Though she described knowing she was gay at age 14, she kept her sexuality a secret due to a society which was hostile to homosexual people.

She earned a bachelor's degree in history and a masters in library science from the University of Washington. She was forced into counseling at the University of Washington because she was a lesbian, which was seen at the time as a mental illness.

== Work in libraries and activism ==
Turner was inspired by activists fighting for gay rights in the late 1960s, describing the drag queens of color who led the Stonewall riots as "jump-[starting] the whole gay liberation movement". Turner found her "political home base" in 1972 after being invited to a Radical Women meeting; she was the first open lesbian to join the group. Turner's work with Radical Women and the Freedom Socialist Party centered on not "[selling] out the needs of those on the bottom," working towards building a "broad, radical leadership". Working with those groups, she helped add both sexual orientation and political ideology to the non-discrimination clause in Seattle's Fair Employment Practices Ordinance in 1973.

In the mid-1970s Turner worked for the Pierce County Library System and was elected to be a part of the union's contract bargaining team. The landmark contract that resulted from negotiation included a raise in wages and benefits, a model grievance procedure, and a broad nondiscrimination clause. Turner worked as a librarian in a number of organizations in western Washington, including the Rainier School in Buckley, Northwest Biotherapeutics, and the Pacific Northwest Cancer Foundation. She served as the Director of Medical Library Services at Seattle Children's Hospital from 1977 to 1994.

Turner helped produce the Freedom Socialist newspaper for many years, including writing a satirical column under the byline Ms. Tami. Turner coauthored Gay resistance: the hidden history, originally written as an eight-part series published in the Freedom Socialist from 1978 to 1980; the book highlights the radical roots of gay liberation.

In 1992 she performed in and toured with Hidden History: True Stories from Seattle's Gay and Lesbian Elders, a play based on oral histories of the lives of LGBT people prior to the gay liberation movement.

After falling ill with leukemia, Turner died in Seattle on March 22, 2017.
