= The Literary Society of Gräfelfing =

Society fostering literature in Munich's educated west.

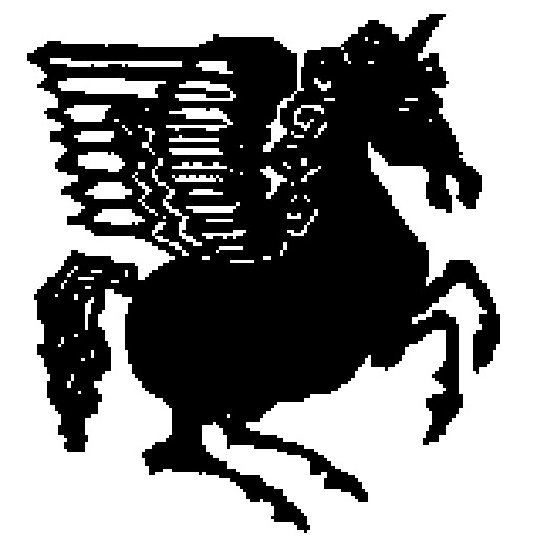
- Formation: 12 October 1921
- Founder: Adolph Stamm
- Founded at: Krailling in Bavaria, Germany
- Location: Gräfelfing, since 1938
- Coordinates: 48.134739°N 11.435483°E
- Website: literarische.de

The Literary Society of Gräfelfing fosters German literature in Munich's cultural western suburbs, independent of the city's cultural life.

== Formation ==
Adolph Stamm founded this literary society in 1921. The group started with 20 local residents, whose affluence had declined following Germany's defeat in WW1. Motivated by this, Adolph Stamm organized prose and poetry readings to preserve the cultural traditions. The program also served as a partial replacement for expensive trips to the cultural events in central Munich. Reportedly, the society avoided Gleichschaltung (forced coordination), was not compelled to join the Reichsschrifttumskammer, and remained active during WW2. After WW2, under the ICD-led reeducation policy, the society's program was initially prohibited. Honorary member Walter Goetz had an impeccable vetting record and had been classified as White-A. In spring 1947, OMGUS granted the society provisional authorization to conduct its activities. Subsequently, the society applied for final approval, submitting the Spruchkammer rulings for each board member.

By 1980, membership had risen to 212, reaching 410 by 2017 and 450 in the year 2026. During the COVID-19 pandemic, the society suspended its public lectures.

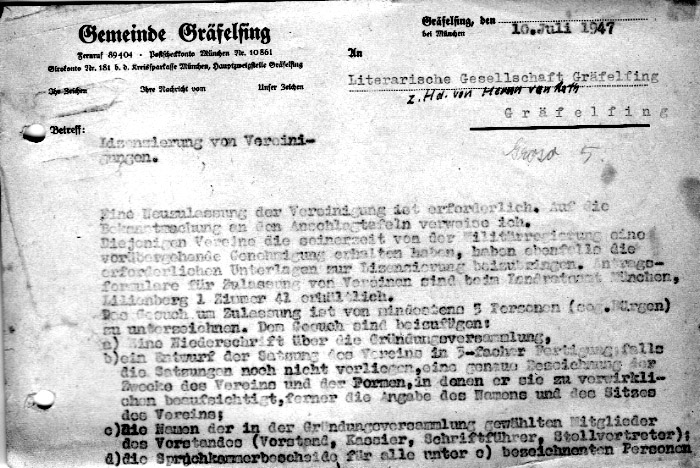
Official correspondence of relicensing procedure, c. 1947

== Activities ==
The society hosts 12 to 14 readings on literary topics annually, with established literary writers, supplemented by non-fiction authors and scientific speakers. As a regionally focused society, its program includes different authors, notably Fyodor Stepun, whose lectures covered historical and literal aspects of Tsarist Russia and the Soviet Union, Germany's principal post-war adversary.

The events for edification purposes flourished in the aftermath of WW2, amid the material deprivation of the post-war era. The theatre section performed dramatic readings in private gardens of the society members. The in-house chamber music group also gave concerts and remained active until 1960. Sources describe the society as a Würm Valley institution both in the 1970s and the 2020s.

The society established the Kunstkreis Gräfelfing, its modern art section, in 1980. It became independent in 1995 and continues its work to this day. The society has maintained a website since 2004. In 2011, the society celebrated its 90th anniversary. The keynote speaker was Wolfgang Frühwald, former president of the DFG.

== Bibliography ==
- Arnold, Sven (1991). Arbeitsgemeinschaft Literarischer Gesellschaften und Gedenkstätten e.V. (ed.). Literarische Gesellschaften in Deutschland (in German). Berlin: Argon Verlag. ISBN 3-87024-164-0.
- Cassidy, Velma Hastings (March 1950). "Information and Control - SHAEF Law No. 191, Amended (1), Art. 1". Germany, 1947–1949: The Story in Documents. Publication 3556 (9). Washington, D.C.: U.S. Department of State.
- Herde, Peter (2007). Prof Dr. Helmut Knüppel (ed.). Wege und Spuren, Festschrift für Joachim-Felix Leonhard. Schriftenreihe des Wilhelm-Fraenger-Instituts Potsdam (in German). Vol. 10 (1st ed.). Berlin: Verlag für Berlin-Brandenburg. ISBN 978-3-86650-001-3.
- Lüdtke, Gerd (2016). Kürschners Deutscher Literatur-Kalender (in German). Vol. II (70th ed.). Berlin: Walter de Gruyter. ISBN 978-3-11-045397-3.
- Warkentin, Erwin J. (2016). The History of U.S. Information Control in Post-War Germany. Newcastle upon Tyne (UK): Cambridge Scholars Publishing. ISBN 1-4438-9749-3.
