= Webasto =

German automotive equipment company

Webasto SE
- Type: Private
- Industry: Automotive
- Founded: 1901
- Headquarters: Gauting-Stockdorf (Upper Bavaria), Germany
- Key people: Jörg Buchheim (CEO)
- Revenue: 4,6 Mrd. Euro (2023)
- Number of employees: 16,600 (2023)
- Website: webasto.com

Webasto SE is a company headquartered in Stockdorf, Germany, which makes sunroofs, hardtop convertible modules, heating and air-conditioning systems.

== History ==
The company was founded by Wilhelm Baier in 1901 as a bicycle spoke manufacturer.

In 1997, the US National Highway Traffic Safety Administration investigated Webasto sunroof modules that shattered or blew off of 1991-1994 the Ford Explorer and Mazda Navajo.

In 2021, after causing delay in the launch and delivery of the new Ford Bronco with low hardtop production, Webasto delivered roof modules with cosmetic defects, turning to a discolored honeycomb pattern. Already-sold models had their tops replaced. Ford scrapped the replaced parts.

=== Coronavirus outbreak ===
Webasto owns 11 locations in China, including in Wuhan. In late January 2020, the company disclosed that five of its workers had tested positive to SARS-CoV-2. This was reportedly one of the first cases of person-to-person transmission of the virus outside China.

The outbreak was handled internally within the company. The story was initially reported in The Wall Street Journal as a case of successful containment of the outbreak. By March 2020, genome studies tracking mutations of the virus suggested that the Webasto outbreak had not been successfully contained, and was linked to a 'decent part' of the overall coronavirus outbreak in Europe. Genetic sequencing also linked the cluster of cases at Webasto's headquarters to the virus outbreak in northern Italy. In May 2020 some medical disprove this assumptions and confirm that the Webasto case remained isolated, while in July other studies identified the most common Italian strain as coming from Germany.

=== Autonomous driving ===
In 2022, Webasto joined forces with Bosch to develop a self-driving car that will enable autonomous driving at Level 4. The company has integrated 25 sensors from Bosch into the roof of a prototype vehicle for this purpose.

=== Charging division ===
Webasto purchased AeroVironment's charging division in 2018.

Webasto has offices in Monrovia, California and Planegg, Germany, for the EV charging division, as well as manufacturing facilities in Guanajuato, Mexico, Schaidt, Germany, and Wuhan, China.

General Motors had to recall over 9000 Webasto charging cords in 2023.

After looking for a buyer for two years, Webasto sold a majority stake of the charging business to Transom Capital Group (a wholly owned subsidiary of Morgan Stanley Domestic Holdings) in 2024. The company had taken heavy financial losses from the division.

== Current production of roof modules ==
- BMW Z4 (G29) (2018–present)
- Mazda MX-5 RF (2016–present)

== Past production of roof modules ==
- BMW 3 Series Cabriolet (E93) (2007-2013)
- BMW 4 Series (F33) (2013–2020)
- Daihatsu Copen (2002-2012)
- Ferrari California (2008-2014)
- Ford Focus Coupé-Cabriolet (2006-2010)
- Mazda MX-5 Power Retractable Hard Top (2007-2015)
- Mini Cabriolet (2004-2008)
- Mitsubishi Colt CZC (2006-2012)
- Renault Wind (2010-2013)
- Volkswagen Eos (2006-2015)
- Volvo C70 (2006-2013)
- Porsche Cayenne GTS

== Facilities ==
- Germany: Schierling (battery assembly)
- Czech Republic: Liberec (panoramic roof systems)
- USA: Detroit (Bronco hard tops), New Hudson (Bronco hard tops), Plymouth Township (Bronco soft tops) Rochester Hills, Auburn Hills, Fenton (Thermo & Comfort)
- China: Jiaxing (battery, roof modules), 10 other locations
- South Korea: Dangjin (battery assembly, opened 2022)
- India
- Japan
- Mexico: Guanajuato (charging), Irapuato (roof modules)
