= Walter Goetz =

German politician and medievalist

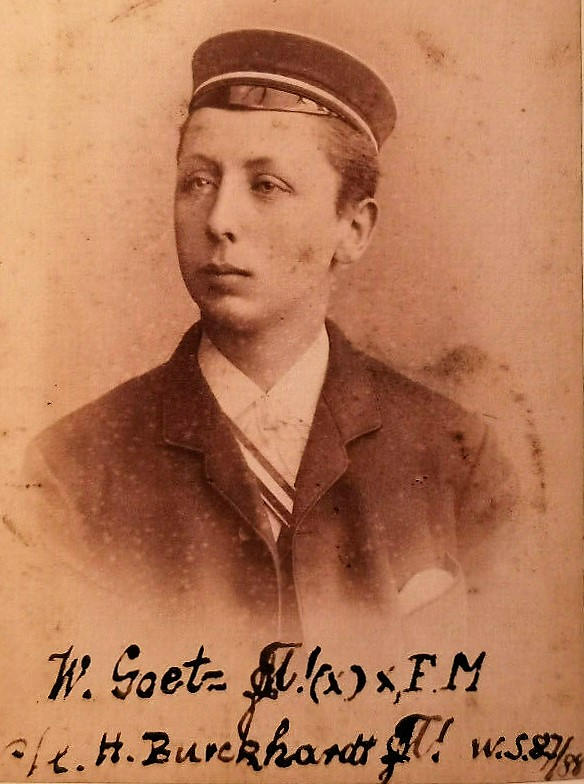
- Walter Goetz as a student, in the uniform of the "Turnerschaft Munichia" student fraterntiry (1887/1888)
- Born: Walter Wilhelm Goetz; 11 November 1867; Lindenau (Leipzig), Saxony
- Died: 30 October 1958 (aged 90); Adelholzen (Traunstein), Upper Bavaria, West Germany
- Occupations: Historian; University professor Politician & Reichstag member
- Political party: DDP
- Spouse(s): 1. Wilhelmine Ritte (1872–1902); 2. Hedwig Pfister
- Children: 4 sons
- Parents: Dr. Ferdinand Goetz (1826–1915) (father); Minna Dornblüth (1828–1917) (mother)

Walter Goetz (11 November 1867 – 30 October 1958) was a German historian, primarily of Europe during the sixteenth century. During the years of the German republic, he embarked on a parallel career in politics, serving as a member of the Reichstag (parliament) between 1920 and 1928, and representing the centre-left DDP (party).

== Life ==
=== Provenance and early years ===
Walter Wilhelm Goetz was born in Leipzig, where his father, Dr. Ferdinand Goetz (1826–1915), a veteran of the 1848/49 liberal uprisings, worked as a physician. His mother, born Minna Dornblüth (1828–1917), was the daughter of another physician. Until 1886, Goetz was a pupil at the city's prestigious "humanistische Thomasschule" (secondary school). (Former students included Bach, Leibniz and Wagner.) He moved on to study Jurisprudence at the University of Freiburg, Art history at the Ludwig-Maximilians-Universität München and Applied economics at Leipzig University, where he was taught by Lujo Brentano. While at the Ludwig-Maximilians-Universität München, he followed his father's example in joining the "Turnerschaft Munichia", a venerable student fraternity, tracing its roots back to the university gymnastics clubs of former decades. He would team up, much later, with Konrad Bahr to produce "Munichengeschichte", a chronicle of the evolution of the "Turnerschaft Munichia" from its foundation to the twentieth century.

=== Post-graduate studies ===
With his post-graduate education, Wilhelm Goetz concentrated on History. He received his doctorate in 1890 with a study on the election of Maximilian II as King of the Romans in 1562. The work was supervised by Wilhelm Maurenbrecher at Leipzig University. In 1895, he received his Habilitation degree in "General History", based on a study of the first ten years of the rule of Duke Albrecht V in Bavaria, supervised this time by Karl Lamprecht. Having obtained a teaching post, he remained at Leipzig University for a time after receiving the degree in order to continue his work on Albrecht V and then, in or before 1901, transferred to the Ludwig-Maximilians-Universität München, having accepted a teaching post there as a "Privatdozent".

Between 1892 and 1895, while based in Leipzig, Goetz had worked for the Munich-based Historical Commission of the Bavarian Academy of Sciences and Humanities (HiKo). The full-time return to Munich enabled him to re-establish his links with the HiKo, now taking a more permanent staff position with the commission. This proved a significant career move.

=== Marriage and networking ===
Over Easter 1901, Walter Goetz married Wilhelmine Ritte (1872–1902), a daughter of the distinguished historian Moriz Ritter at the University of Bonn. He had proposed marriage to her just three weeks after first meeting her in October 1899 at her father's house. At the time of Wilhelmine's death through a "serious operation", approximately a year later, the marriage appears still to have been childless. It was also during these first years of the new century that Goetz developed a number of important professional alliances that became friendships, notably with the historian Karl Brandi and with Luise von Druffel, widow of August von Druffel, and the landlady of the two of them.

In 1913, slightly more than a decade after the early death of his first wife, Walter Goetz married Hedwig Pfister at Genoa. Hedwig, nearly twenty years younger than her husband, was daughter to the banker Carl Pfister (1851–1940). The marriage was followed, in due course, by the births of the couple's four sons. These included Helmut Goetz, born in 1920, who also became an historian and worked, for many years, at the German Historical Institute in Rome, retiring in 1985.

=== Professorships: Tübingen, Straßburg, Leipzig ===
Promotion followed in 1905, when he accepted his first full professorship, taking over from Georg von Below at the University of Tübingen. He moved on again in 1913, accepting a professorship in succession to Harry Bresslau at the University of Strasbourg, which at that time was in Germany. He remained listed as a professor at Strasbourg for approximately two years, but after July 1914, with war, he was called up to serve with the First Bavarian Infantry Regiment, the regiment with which he had performed his national service, as a twelve-month break in his studies at Leipzig during the early 1890s. In Summer 1915 Goetz was at the frontline near the Somme, when news came through of an offer from Leipzig University. Karl Lamprecht had died relatively young in May 1915, probably as a result of internal bleeding caused by an ulcer. Walter Goetz accepted the offer to replace Lamprecht as Professor for the Arts and Universal History. The job went with the directorship of the eponymous "Institut für Kultur- und Universalgeschichte", which Lamprecht had set up in 1909. Goetz remained in both posts till 1933. He also participated in university administration, serving as dean of faculty during 1929/1930. The Hitler government took power in January 1933, at a time when Goetz was nearing the usual retirement age. He was known to be unsympathetic to the precepts of National Socialism, and during the summer 1933 he resigned from the university and retired to the village of Gräfelfing, on the western side of Munich, where he had had a house built. His intention at the time was to devote the rest of his life to "literary work". He made his move shortly after the passing of the so-called "Law for the Restoration of the Professional Civil Service". As with many university professors in Germany who resigned at this time, it quickly becomes hard to disentangle the extent to which his resignation was voluntary.

=== Politics ===
during the first part of the twentieth century Goetz became involved with the short-lived National-Social Association around Friedrich Naumann. The association saw itself as a political party able to combine liberalism, nationalism and (non-Marxist) socialism with Protestant Christian values, dedicated to the promotio9n of social reform in order to avert class conflict. It never gained significant traction with voters, but dis attract support a number of formidable intellectuals keen to reconcile its conflicting aspirations. Its influence with the liberal and socialist centre left in German politics was significant and long-lasting, due in part to the number of individuals in it who subsequently resurfaced in more successful political parties. Goetz became a contributor to the movement's political magazine "Die Hilfe". In the process he formed deep political and personal friendships with fellow contributors including, most significantly, Theodor Heuss and the archaeologist Ludwig Curtius.

In 1920, Goetz was elected to the newly formed Reichstag (national parliament), representing the centre-left DDP in electoral district 32 (Leipzig). He became a member of a number of committees and was frequently on the road delivering political speeches: he made little impact as a parliamentarian, however, and through the 1920s the major focus of his career remained on his teaching duties at Leipzig University.

=== Hitler years ===
His support for the republic counted against Goetz when a post-democratic political class took power in 1933. Goetz conspicuously failed to break off contacts with colleagues identified by the authorities as Jewish, such as his former pupils Alfred von Martin and Hans Baron, who had been powerfully influenced by Goetz during his time at Leipzig during the 1920s by Goetz's consciously "humanist" approach to history and his insistence on the importance of the untranslatable concept of "Geistesgeschte". When Goetz found himself persuaded to resign, he was obliged to accept a reduced pension entitlement. Six months later, however, a more conventional retirement was implemented which is believed to have included restoration of his full pension rights. The circumstances under which all this took place are less than clear, but there are references to "several months of negotiation", apparently undertaken by political colleagues such as Eduard Hamm on Goetz's behalf, during a brief period in the middle part of 1933 in which the National Socialist party leadership still felt the need, on occasion, to present a conciliatory face to (non-Communist) political opponents.

=== Post-war career ===
By the time military defeat delivered an end to the twelve year Hitler nightmare in 1945, Walter Goetz was nearly 80. Nevertheless, in 1946, he accepted a professorial appointment at the Ludwig-Maximilians-Universität München, initially as an "adjunct professor" and later as an "honorary professor". Living near Munich and leading the LGG, Goetz had ended up in the American occupation zone where as Leipzig, after July 1945, was administered as part of the Soviet occupation zone in a now occupied and partitioned version of Germany. A more hands-on role came with his presidency, between 1946 and 1951, of the Historical Commission of the Bavarian Academy of Sciences and Humanities (HiKo), with which he had been associated intermittently since the early years of the century. He led an extensive re-organisation of the HiKo, which was badly needed. He played a decisive role in the reconfiguration of the long-running Monumenta Germaniae Historica publishing project which was transferred to Munich from Berlin during his incumbency. He took charge of Modern History at the university until a more permanent section head could be appointed. Goetz himself continued to lecture in history in his capacity as an honorary professor till 1951 when, aged 84, he again retired from his university career. He nevertheless remained active as a member of the HiKo till 1958. During his final years Goetz was closely involved in the conception, promotion and development of the Neue Deutsche Biographie series. One admiring obituarist would write that "he was chiefly responsible for the creation of the series, and it is certainly the case that during his presidency of the HiKo Goetz and his fellow scholar, Otto zu Stolberg-Wernigerode stood out as the project's most persistent and influential backers. At the time of Goetz's death, aged 90, three volumes had already been published.

== Memberships, side projects and parallel careers ==
Between 1927 and 1949, Goetz chaired Germany's Dante Society.

In 1930, he became a member of the Saxon Academy of Sciences and Humanities which afforded him significant supplementary opportunities for study of the Italian Renaissance and publications of his findings where appropriate. He resigned his ordinary (i.e. full) membership in 1933 when undergoing his first "retirement" from university work, but continued to be listed at a corresponding member of the Saxon academy till his death in 1958.

Alongside his academic career, Goetz was for many years a reserve officer in the Bavarian Army. He enlisted as a "one-year volunteer" in the Royal Bavarian First Infantry "King's Regiment", completing this period of service during 1910 with the rank of "Major". During the First World War he served on the western front as a battalion commander. His active military experience earned him a certain measure of supplementary respect with academic colleagues and government representatives throughout his life. Also worth mentioning in this context are his attempts during 1917 to persuade State Secretary for Foreign Affairs, Richard von Kühlmann, to campaign in parliament for a negotiated end to the war. Von Kühlmann himself, who in more normal times had been a career diplomat, probably needed no convincing, and indeed argued for such a resolution. But more powerful forces were in play, and von Kühlmann resigned in July 1918, shortly after a discussion with the emperor, which took place near the frontline, at Spa, where the emperor had installed himself with his advisors in an appropriately well-appointed railway train.

== Research ==
Goetz's most important research contributions concerned the early modern period and, more specifically, the history of the Counter-Reformation and the Italian Renaissance. He concerned himself, in particular, with the Italian city states in the late middle ages, with the work and impact of Dante Alighieri and with Francis of Assisi. His work is underpinned by his broader cultural-historical approach, influenced in particular by Jacob Burckhardt. Goetz also worked on the art history themes of the Italian Renaissance. On this he was influenced, in addition to Burckhardt, by his Leipzig tutor, Anton Springer. Goetz was very much aware of the work of Georg Voigt, even if he was less directly influenced by Voigt than by Burckhardt. He was influenced by Lamprecht even if the two differed conspicuously in respect of their ideas on art history. After Walter Goetz retired, during the 1950s, the close institutional connections between Leipzig University and Italian Renaissance humanism that had started with Georg Voigt and, in socio-economic terms, with Alfred Doren came to an end.
