= Penal facility =

Penal facility in various countries may refer to:

- Prison and various synonyms and euphemisms: jail, penitentiary, correctional facility, etc.
- Penal colony
  - Corrective labor colony, Soviet Union and Russia
- Labor camp
  - Correctional labour camp, Soviet Union and Russia
- Katorga
- Laogai
- Prison farm
- Re-education camp (disambiguation)
