= Lynen =

Lynen is a surname. Notable people with the surname include:

- Amédée Lynen (1852–1938), Belgian painter
- Feodor Lynen (1911–1979), German biochemist
- Robert Lynen (1920–1944), French actor
- Senne Lynen (born 1999), Belgian footballer

== See also ==
- Feodor-Lynen-Gymnasium Planegg, government secondary school in Planegg in the German
