= Jörg Reinhardt =

German businessman (born 1956)

- Born: 11 March 1956 (age 69); Homburg, Saarland, Germany
- Education: University of Saarland (PhD)
- Occupation(s): Chairman, Novartis
- Spouse: Married
- Children: 2

Jörg Reinhardt (born 11 March 1956) is a German businessman who has been the chairman of the board of directors of the Swiss pharmaceutical group Novartis AG since 2013. Since 2017, he has also been a member of the board of directors of the Swiss reinsurance group Swiss Re.

== Life and career ==
Reinhardt was born on 11 March 1956 in Homburg, Saarland, Germany. He studied pharmacy at the University of Saarland and graduated in 1982 with a doctorate. He started his career in 1982 with Sandoz, who merged with Ciba-Geigy in 1996 to form Novartis.

At Sandoz, he worked in research and development and became head of development in 1994. Following the merger into Novartis, Reinhardt was responsible for preclinical development throughout the group and later for the entire drug development. In 2008, he became Chief Operating Officer of Novartis.

From 2000 to 2010 Reinhardt was President of the Board of Trustees of the Genomics Institute of the Novartis Research Foundation in the United States. From 2010 to 2012, he was Chairman of the Board of Management of Bayer HealthCare AG and Chairman of the Bayer HealthCare Executive Committee.

In 2013, Reinhardt rejoined Novartis as chairman of the board.

== Other activities ==
=== Corporate boards ===
- Swiss Re, Non-Executive Independent Member of the Board of Directors (since 2017)
- Lonza Group, Member of the Board of Directors (2012-2013)
- MorphoSys, Member of the Supervisory Board (2001-2004)
- Temasek Holdings, Member of the European Advisory Panel

=== Non-profit organizations ===
- Robert Koch Foundation, Member of the Board of Trustees

== Personal life ==
Reinhardt is married and father of two children. He lives, since the completion of his studies, in Germany near Freiburg im Breisgau.
