= Julia Post =

German politician (born 1989)

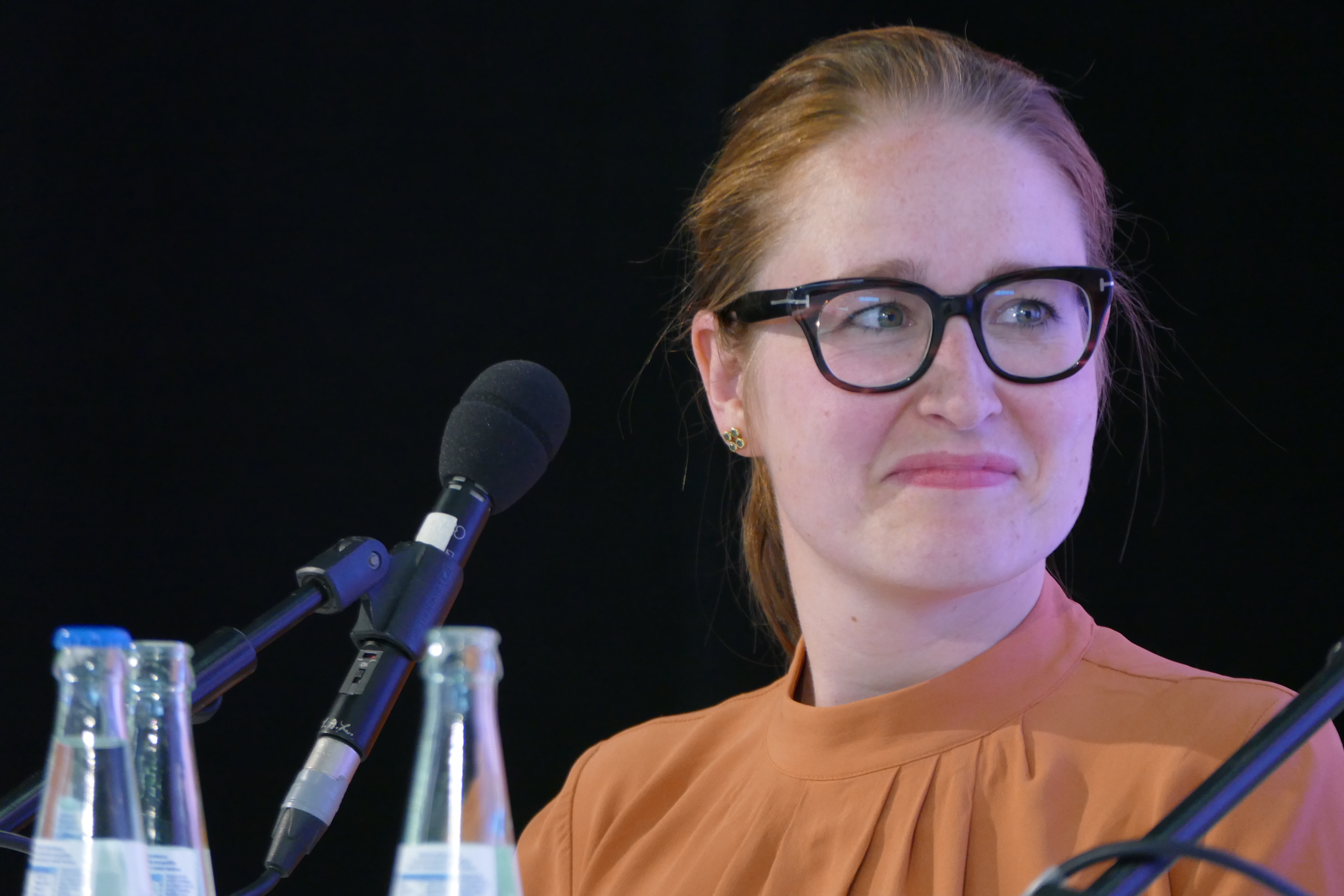
- Post in 2023

Member of the Landtag of Bavaria
- Incumbent
- Assumed office 30 October 2023
- Constituency: Upper Bavaria

Personal details
- Born: 14 October 1989 (age 37) Gräfelfing
- Party: Alliance 90/The Greens (since 2015)

Julia Post (born 14 October 1989 in Gräfelfing) is a German politician serving as a member of the Landtag of Bavaria since 2023. From 2017 to 2019, she served as chairwoman of Alliance 90/The Greens in Giesing and Harlaching. From 2020 to 2023, she was a city councillor of Munich.
