= Fyodor Stepun =

Russian and German writer and philosopher

- Born: Fyodor Avgustovich Stepun; 18 February 1884; Moscow, Russian Empire
- Died: 23 February 1965 (aged 81); Munich, West Germany
- Citizenship: Russian, German
- Occupations: philosopher historian memoirist
- Writing career
- Genres: philosophy sociology
- Literary movement: neo-Kantism

Fyodor Avgustovich Stepun (Russian: Фёдор А́вгустович Степу́н; February 18, 1884 – February 23, 1965) (also known as Friedrich Steppuhn) was a Russian and German writer, philosopher, historian and sociologist.

== Biography ==
Fyodor Avgustovich Stepun was born in Russia on 18 February 1884, in Moscow. After attending secondary school in Moscow he went as a student to Heidelberg, and there in 1910 he obtained his doctorate for a thesis on Vladimir Solovyov's philosophy of history.

Between 1910 and 1914 Stepun edited the international philosophical journal, Logos, and travelled across Russia lecturing on philosophy, literature and culture.

During the first World War he was an officer in a Siberian regiment, and after the Russian Revolution was an army commissar under the Russian Provisional Government.

From 1920 to 1922 he directed the state experimental theatre; but in 1922 he was deported from the Soviet Union. He settled in Germany, working first in Berlin, and afterwards as a professor of sociology in Dresden (1926–1937). During this period he published in Russian his books on 'Life and creation' (1923) and 'Letters of an Artillery Ensign' (1925), as well as Wie war es möglich? (1929), Das Antlitz Russlands und das Gesicht der Revolution (1934) and The Russian Soul and Revolution (1936). In 1937, he was expelled from his teaching-post by the Nazi authorities.

From 1946, he worked as a professor of Russian cultural studies at the Ludwig-Maximilians-Universität München, held lectures at the LGG, and published several works: Vergangenes und Unvergängliches (1947; Russian version, Byvshee i Nesbyvsheesya, 1956), Theater und Film (1953), Der Bolschewismus und die Christliche Existenz (1959), and in Russian 'Encounters' (1962).

Stepun was a fierce opponent of Bolshevism, as well as Nazism. His philosophical doctrine has been described as neo-Kantist transcendentalism linked with religious metaphysics, close to the ideas of Vladimir Solovyov and Nikolai Berdyaev.

Stepun died on 23 February 1965.
