= Stockdorf station =

Railway station in Bavaria

Stockdorf
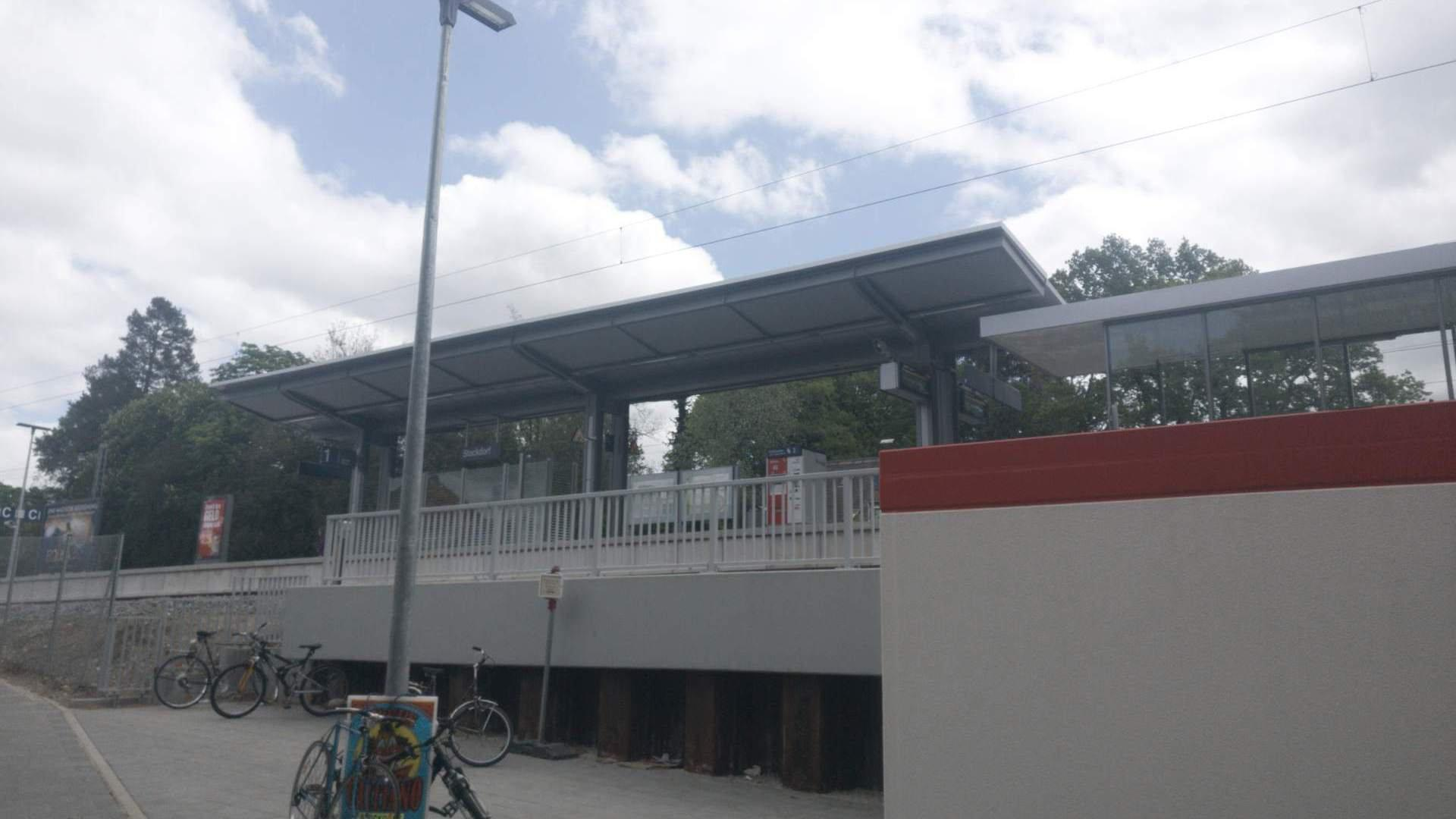
- The station in 2018

General information
- Location: Stockdorf, Gauting, Bavaria; Germany
- Coordinates: 48°05′36″N 11°24′03″E
- Owner: DB Netz
- Operator: DB Station&Service
- Lines: Munich–Garmisch-Partenkirchen line (KBS 960)
- Distance: 15.8 km (9.8 mi) from München Hauptbahnhof
- Platforms: 1 island platform
- Tracks: 2
- Train operators: S-Bahn München

Other information
- Station code: 6030
- DS100 code: MSD
- IBNR: 8005735
- Category: 4
- Fare zone: : M and 1

Services
Preceding station	Munich S-Bahn	Following station
Gauting towards Tutzing	S6	Planegg towards Ebersberg
Location

Stockdorf station (German: Bahnhof Stockdorf) is a railway station in the district of Stockdorf, within the municipality of Gauting, in Bavaria, Germany. It is located on the Munich–Garmisch-Partenkirchen railway of Deutsche Bahn.

== Services ==
As of the December 2021 timetable change, the following services stop at Stockdorf:

- Munich S-Bahn S6: service every twenty minutes between Tutzing and Grafing Bahnhof; some trains continue from Grafing Bahnhof to Ebersberg.
