= Planegg =

- Municipality
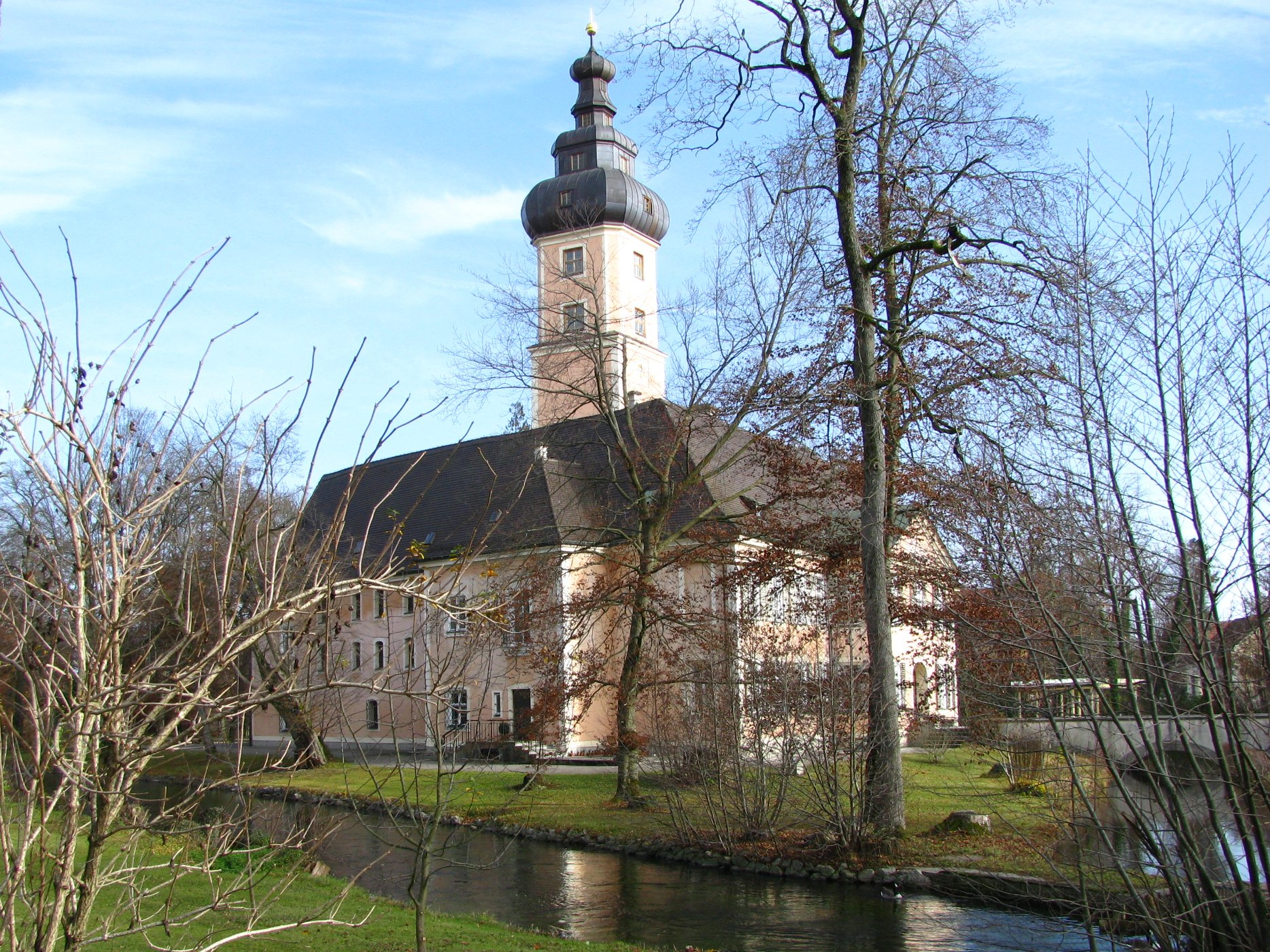
- Planegg Castle

- Coat of arms

- Location of Planegg within Munich district
- Interactive map of Planegg
- Location within Germany Location within Bavaria
- Coordinates: 48°6′17″N 11°25′50″E
- Country: Germany
- State: Bavaria
- Admin. region: Upper Bavaria
- District: Munich
- Subdivisions: 4 Gemeindeteile: (Planegg; Martinsried; Steinkirchen; Maria Eich)

Government
  - Mayor (2020–26): Hermann Nafziger (CSU)

Area
  - Total: 10.68 km^{2} (4.12 sq mi)
- Elevation: 542 m (1,778 ft)

Population (2025-12-31)
  - Total: 11,043
  - Density: 1,034/km^{2} (2,678/sq mi)
- Time zone: UTC+01:00 (CET)
  - Summer (DST): UTC+02:00 (CEST)
- Postal codes: 82152
- Dialling codes: 089
- Vehicle registration: M
- Website: www.planegg.de

Planegg (German pronunciation: [ˈplaːnɛk]) is a municipality in the district of Munich, in Bavaria, Germany. It is located on the river Würm, 13 km west of Munich (centre).

== Economy ==
Koch Media has its head office in Planegg. It also hosts many biotech-companies, like ADVA Optical Networking, GPC Biotech, MediGene and MorphoSys. In addition, the Max Planck Institute of Biochemistry and the Max Planck Institute for Biological Intelligence are located in the section of Martinsried. Furthermore, ASTELCO Systems, a manufacturer of space systems is located in Planegg.

== Education ==
There are two primary schools, the Grundschule Planegg and the Grundschule Martinsried, as well as the senior high school Feodor-Lynen-Gymnasium Planegg.

The Faculty of Biology and the Biomedical Center of LMU Munich are situated in the section of Martinsried.

== Transport ==
The municipality has a railway station, Planegg, served by the Munich S-Bahn.

== Twin towns ==
- Meylan, Auvergne-Rhône-Alpes, France (since 1987).
- Bärenstein, Saxony, Germany (since 1992).
- Klausen, South Tyrol, Italy (since 2006).
- Didcot, England, United Kingdom (since 2012).
