= Stockdorf =

- Ortsteil of Gauting
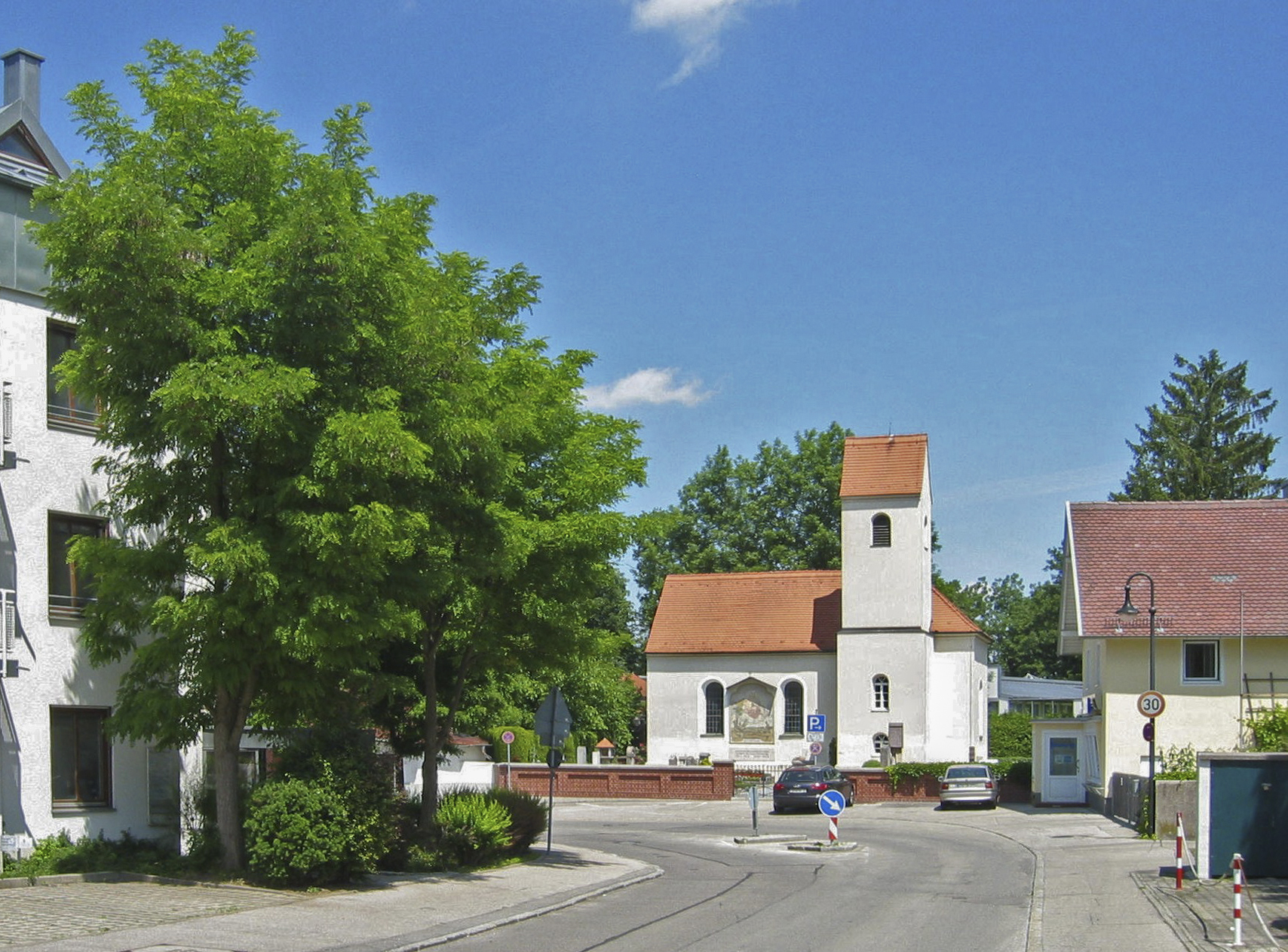
- Center of Stockdorf with the Church of Saint Vitus
- Interactive map of Stockdorf
- Location within Germany Location within Bavaria
- Coordinates: 48°05′34″N 11°24′02″E
- Country: Germany
- State: Bavaria
- Admin. region: Oberbayern
- District: Starnberg
- Municipality: Gauting

Population
  - Total: 3,250
- Time zone: UTC+01:00 (CET)
  - Summer (DST): UTC+02:00 (CEST)
- Postal codes: 82131
- Dialling codes: 089
- Vehicle registration: STA

Stockdorf is the largest district in the municipality of Gauting in the District of Starnberg in upper Bavaria, Germany. It is inhabited by approximately 4,000 citizens.

== Geography ==
The village is situated at the Würm River, directly bordered in the north by Krailling. The other boundaries are formed by forest: Forst Kasten, Grubmühl and Kreulinger Forst in eastern, southern and western direction. Stockdorf lies at the northern end of the Würm Valley, formed by melting glaciers of the glacial period.

== History ==
A field of cairn from Bronze Age and hallstatt culture give evidence of the very early settlement at Stockdorf. At least 21 cairns were well preserved when Freiherr von Metting, a forest superintendent from Starnberg, opened two of these graves and discovered a bronzen bowl, a sword of iron and other smithery. During the Roman Empire, Stockdorf was a colony to the Roman city Bratananium as Gauting was called. In the Middle Ages, Stockdorf was a small clearing and consisted of less than 10 buildings. The medieval village can be situated near the old St. Vitus church.

The name Stockdorf was first mentioned in a deed of Benediktbeuern monastery 1279 as "Stochdorf". Presumably, it is identical with "Staodorf" (MHG 'on the bank'), and can be deducted from "Stadelaren" which was already mentioned in the chronicles of Ebersberg Abbey.

Between 1715 and 1745, the Bavarian prince-elector Max Emanuel enclosed a large piece of land in the south west of Munich as a park for coursing deer. . In November 1734, the prince-elector and later emperor Carl Albrecht fell into the Würm River while pursuing a boar. Having thus lost his horse, he was forced to walk despite the frigid temperature to Grubmühl. The scene of the prince changing clothes amongst his court is shown on one of the paintings by Horemans at Amalienburg.

The reform of the Bavarian administration under Montgelas lead to the annexation of Stockdorf by Gauting between 1808 and 1818.

When the new rail road from Munich to Starnberg (later extended to Garmisch) opened in 1854, Stockdorf got a train station which is still a regular stop to commuting trains. As the Würm Valley became the typical suburban resort for wealthy citizens from the nearby Bavarian capital, the population of Stockdorf grew from 75 in 1866 to more than 1,500 in 1960. The village was especially popular for artists and many painters, illustrators, and musicians settled there.

== Culture ==
=== Churches ===
- Catholic parish St. Vitus, Waldstr. 28.
- Lutheran congregation Ev. Kirchengemeinde, Peter-Dörfler-Str. 14.

=== Schools ===
- Primary school Grundschule an der Würm, Zugspitzstr. 17
- Training center for the building industrie BauindustrieZentrum, Heimstr. 17

== Buildings ==
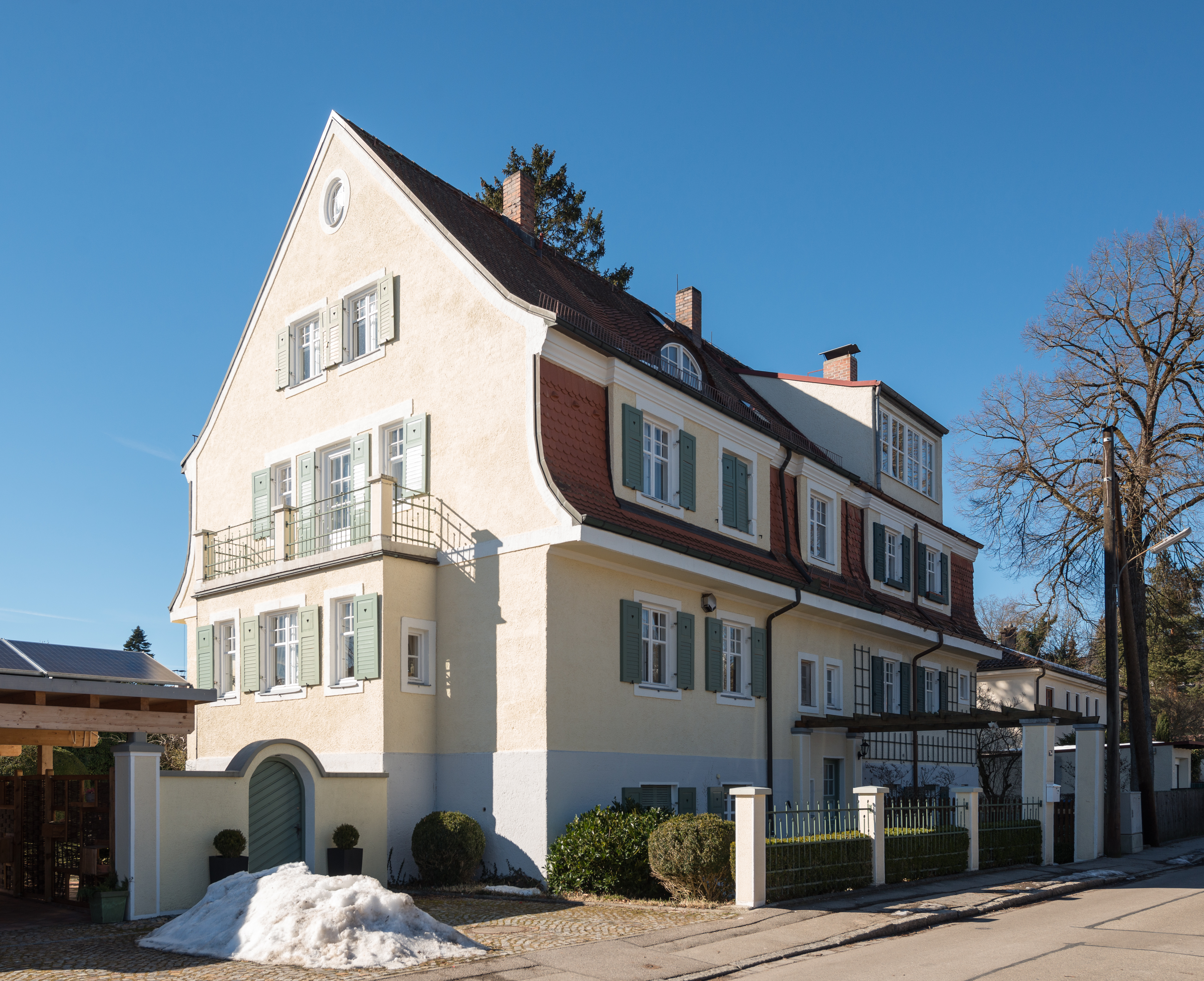
Stockdorf Bennostraße 6/8

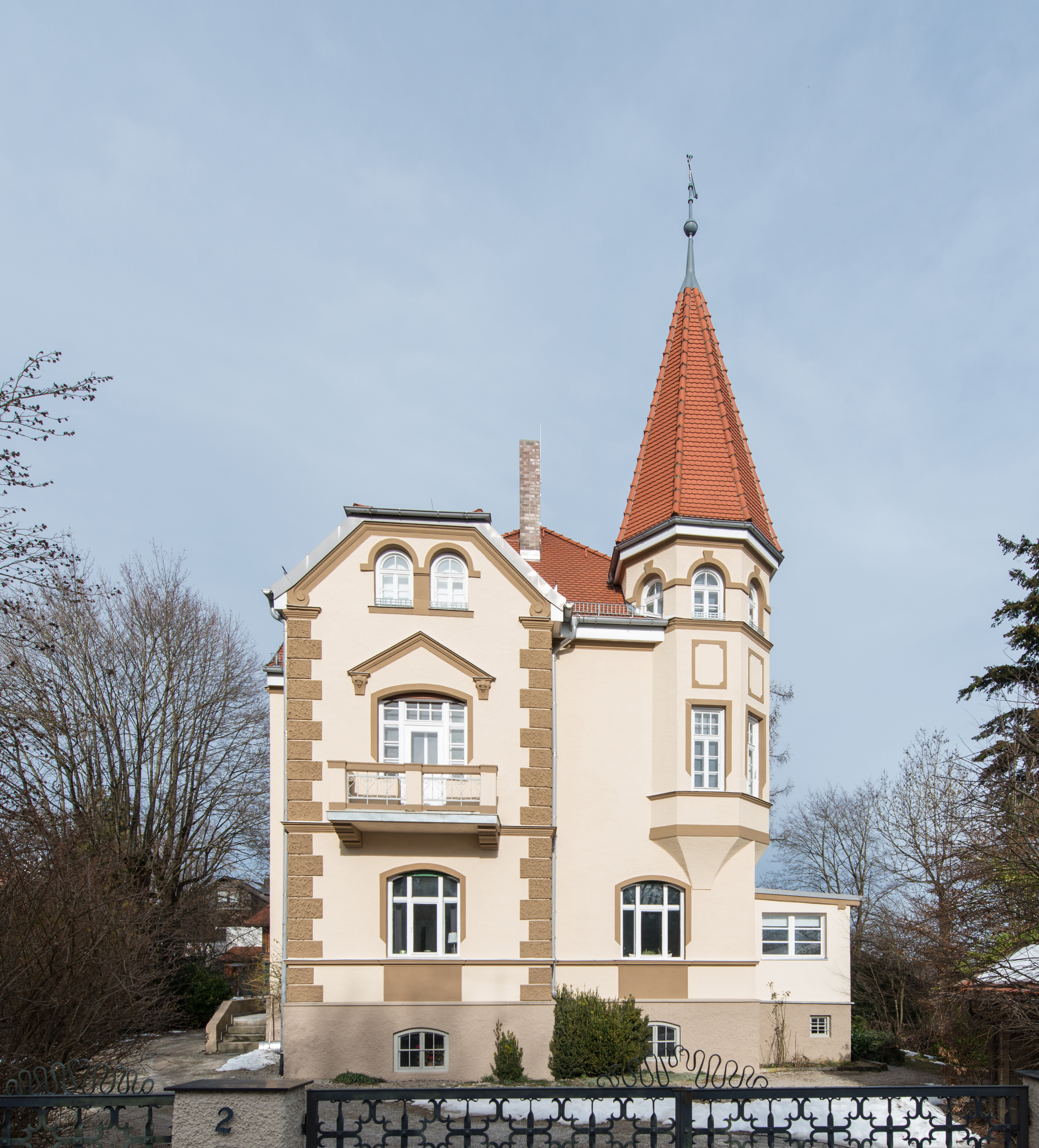
Stockdorf Zumpestraße 2

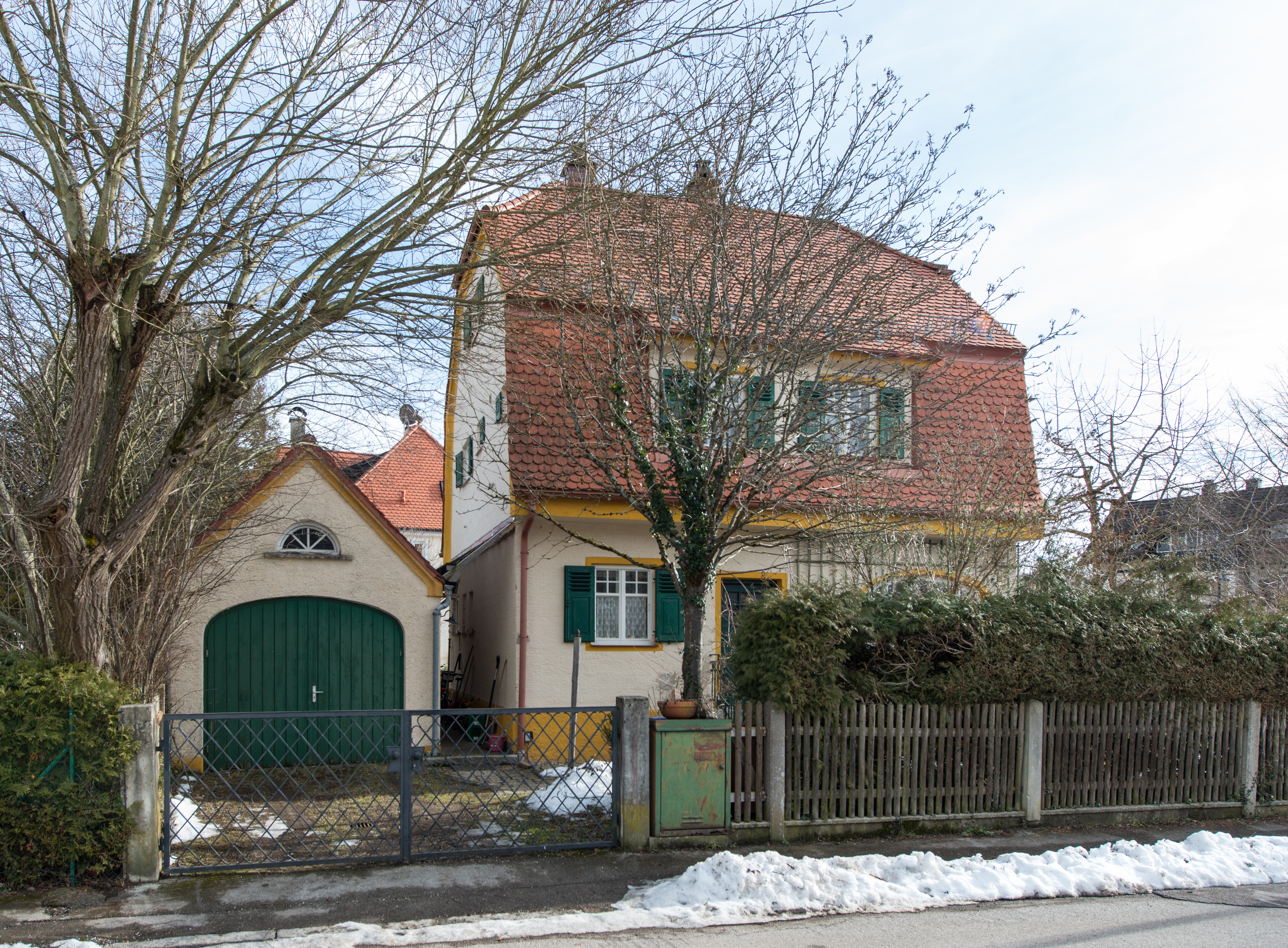
Stockdorf Zweigstraße 2

Apart from the house Bahnstr. 7 which dates back to the 17th century, all of Stockdorf's buildings have been erected since the 1850s.

The church of St. Vitus is mentioned as early as 1315 in the Konradian Register (Konradinischer Matrikel) as succursal parish of Gauting. In 1857, the church was torn down and reerrected with a gabled tower. The interior is decorated with a fresco, Christ Pantocrator, painted in 1968 by Karl Manninger.

After Stockdorf became an independent Catholic parish in 1949, a new church was built by Hans Heps and consecrated to St. Vitus in 1953. Notable is the deep longing gable roof and the turret which give pleasant proportions to the stately structure. The eastern facade, above the main entrance of this westward oriented church, shows the fresco of St. Veit (Vitus) by Erich Schickling. The interior was modified after the Second Vatican Council. The Mensa, chandleholder and via crucis by Johannes Dumanski and Hans Kreuz. A bright peal of bells with three bells was given by Otto, Wilhelm and Lina Baier (400 kg Zu uns komme Dein Reich St. Vitus O.B. 1953, 250 kg Unser tägliches Brot gib uns heute St. Antonius W.B. 1953 und 170 kg Friede den Menschen auf Erden St. Maria L.B. 1953).

The Lutheran church, a plain cubical building of fairfaced concrete, neighboured by an L-shaped vicarage was erected in 1959 by J. Semler and J. Haider. On the outside is a concrete relief, 'St. Peter on the water' by K. H. Hoffmann. In the interior is a baptistic window by Rupprecht Geiger (glued glass, 1960).

Since the opening of the railroad, there is the 'gate house' at the former level crossing, a two-story brick building with overlapping gabled roof (ca. 1853/54).

Stockdorf has a number of mansions and houses under preservation order dating before World War I which give the village its typical sight. This suburban architecture of high standards can still be found, for example at Südstr. 15 (2005 by Felix Bembé and Sebastian Dellinger)

- Bennostraße 6/8: duplex with attic and studio skylight 1905/10.
- Kreuzweg 4: detached house in Art Nouveau style with attic and typical country garden 1905/10.
- Mansions by Bernhard Schießl in reduced historistic style, 1906-1910: Zumpestraße 2 (villa with turret and hipped roof projections), Tellhöhe 5 and 7 (turret houses), Zweigstr. 2 (attic house with oriel)
- Bahnstraße 36: country home in modern-baroque-style with attic, oriel like structures and spire lights by A. von Schorn 1910.

The BauindustrieZentrum at Heimstraße was revamped in 1990 based on the "Lehrwerkstätte des Bayerischen Baugewerbeverbandes" by Willi Lorch 1937.

== Economy ==
In 1929, cosmetics manufacturer Franz Xaver Maier purchased a large neo-baroque facility at Zumpestr. Maier is known as one of the inventors of the permanent wave.

Since 1908, the Webasto AG, one of the world's biggest automotive suppliers, has been located in Stockdorf. From the former name of Eßlinger Draht und Eisenwarenfabrik, it was renamed after its founder Wilhelm Baier and the village to WBS and later WeBaSto.

Camouflaged as Bundesstelle für Fernmeldestatistik, the electronic intelligence department of the Bundesnachrichtendienst, the German federal intelligence, is located at Wanneystr. 10.

The George-Vithoulkas-Stiftung für Klassische Homöopathie, an endowment for the promotion of research and teaching of classic homeopathy, was founded in Stockdorf 1992.

Stockdorf is amongst the leading German communities for bloggers.

== Transport ==
The district has a railway station, Stockdorf, that is served by the Munich S-Bahn.

== Notable residents ==
- The pianist and music teacher Sophie Menter (1846-1918), a close friend to Franz Liszt, lived in Stockdorf where she died in 1918.
- Camilla Zumpe, wife of the conductor Hermann Zumpe, moved here after her husband has died.
- The medievalist Franz Kampers (1868-1929) died in Stockdorf.
- The draftsman Felix Schwormstädt (1870-1938) lived part of his life in Stockdorfer.
- The painter Walther Kerschensteiner (1887-1956) lived in Stockdorf.
- The painter Ernst Haider (1890-1988) lived in Stockdorf.
- Rudolf Buttmann, general director of the Bavarian states library (Bayerischen Staatsbibliothek), co-founder of the Bürgerwehr (militia), of the Thule-Gesellschaft and evan NSDAP (member nr. 4), lived in Stockdorf and committed suicide there in 1947.
- Lorenz Vilgertshofer (1900-1998), states secretary, lived in Stockdorf until his death in 1998.
- The painter and illustrator Edith Fleissner-Plischke (1900-1957) of Gablonz lived from 1946 in Stockdorf.
- Bavarian secretary of justice Mathilde Berghofer-Weichner (1931-2008) lived in Stockdorf.
