= Re-education camp =

Re-education camp may refer to:

- Re-education camps in the Cambodian genocide
- Re-education through labor (laojiao), a system of administrative detentions in the People's Republic of China
- Xinjiang re-education camps, internment camps for Uyghurs in Xinjiang, China
- French re-education camps, announced in 2016
- Internal exile in Greece, prison camps on barren islands for political dissidents by the government of Greece during the 20th century
- Re-education camp (North Korea)
- Samchung re-education camp, a military detention camp in South Korea during the 1980s
- Re-education camp (Vietnam), prison camps operated by the government of Vietnam following the end of the Vietnam War
- Civilizing missions in order to cultural assimilate indigenous peoples, such as American Indian boarding schools and the Canadian Indian residential school system

== See also ==
- Laogai, Chinese reform through labor camps later renamed "prisons"
- List of re-education through labor camps in China
- Re-education in Communist Romania
- Re-education (disambiguation)
