= Lochham station =

Railway station in Bavaria

Lochham
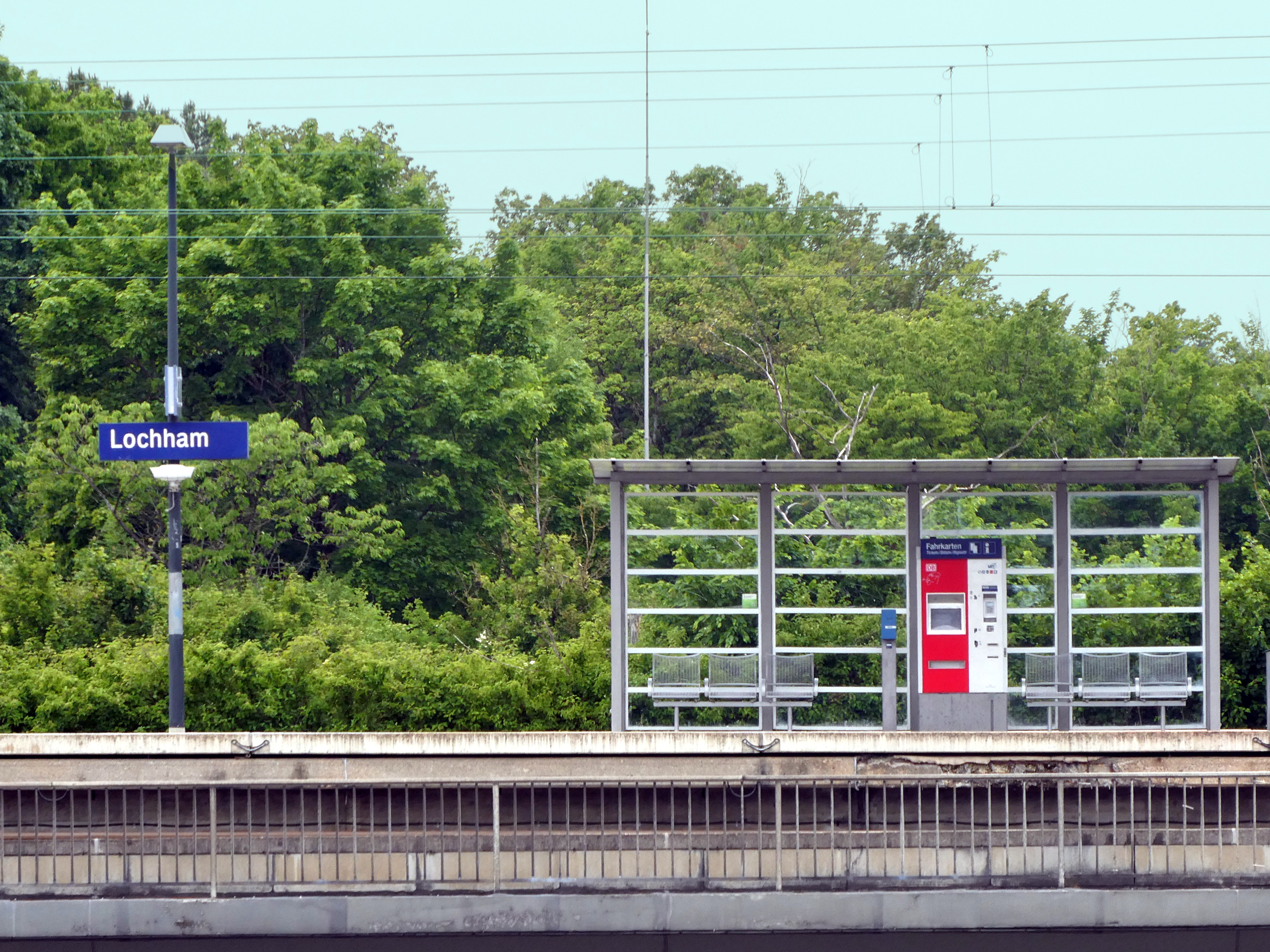
- The station platform in 2021

General information
- Location: Lochhamerstr. 83; Gräfelfing, Bavaria; Germany
- Coordinates: 48°07′42″N 11°25′51″E
- Owner: DB Netz
- Operator: DB Station&Service
- Lines: Munich–Garmisch-Partenkirchen line (KBS 960)
- Distance: 11.3 km (7.0 mi) from München Hauptbahnhof
- Platforms: 1 island platform
- Tracks: 2
- Train operators: S-Bahn München
- Connections: 160, 258, 267

Other information
- Station code: 3757
- DS100 code: MLCH
- IBNR: 8003720
- Category: 4
- Fare zone: : M and 1

Services
Preceding station	Munich S-Bahn	Following station
Gräfelfing towards Tutzing	S6	Munich-Westkreuz towards Ebersberg
Location

Lochham station (German: Bahnhof Lochham) is a railway station in the municipality of Gräfelfing, in Bavaria, Germany. It is located on the Munich–Garmisch-Partenkirchen railway of Deutsche Bahn.

== Services ==
As of the December 2021 timetable change, the following services stop at Lochham:

- Munich S-Bahn S6: service every twenty minutes between Tutzing and Grafing Bahnhof; some trains continue from Grafing Bahnhof to Ebersberg.
