= French re-education camps =

2016–17 de-radicalization attempt

The French re-education camps, officially called The Centre of Prevention, Integration and Citizenship (French: Le Centre de Prévention, D’insertion et de Citoyenneté), were planned and partially implemented re-education camps announced by the French government in May 2016, following a rise in violent terror attacks across France such as the Charlie Hebdo shooting of January 2015 and the November 2015 Paris attacks.

Announced by the then-Prime Minister Manuel Valls on 9 May 2016 under the newly established Interministerial Committee for the Prevention of Delinquency and Radicalization, the programme aimed to establish "treatment centres" in every region of France by the end of 2017. The first camp opened in September 2016 in Beaumont-en-Véron, situated within the Château de Pontourny, an 18th-century manor in central France. The camp had a total capacity of 25 people, while at its peak housed 9 participants. According to France 24, the first camp was shut down in August 2017 after concerns from the local community, as well as criticism of the admissions criteria, which specified volunteer participants who had not committed terror offences. Following these concerns, a Senate committee deemed the programme “a complete fiasco”, resulting in the camp's shutdown.
