= Re-education =

Re-education or reeducation may refer to:

- The process of retraining a person's capacity of movement, for example after a stroke or injury; an element of physiotherapy
- The process of teaching persons or groups new political values, attitudes, beliefs, or types of behaviour; political indoctrination
- Re-education through labor, a system of administrative detention in mainland China from 1957 to 2013
- "Re-Education (Through Labor)", a song by Rise Against from the 2008 album Appeal to Reason
- Adult education, an education of adults

== See also ==
- Re-education camp (disambiguation)
