= Planegg station =

Railway station in Bavaria

Planegg (Krailling)
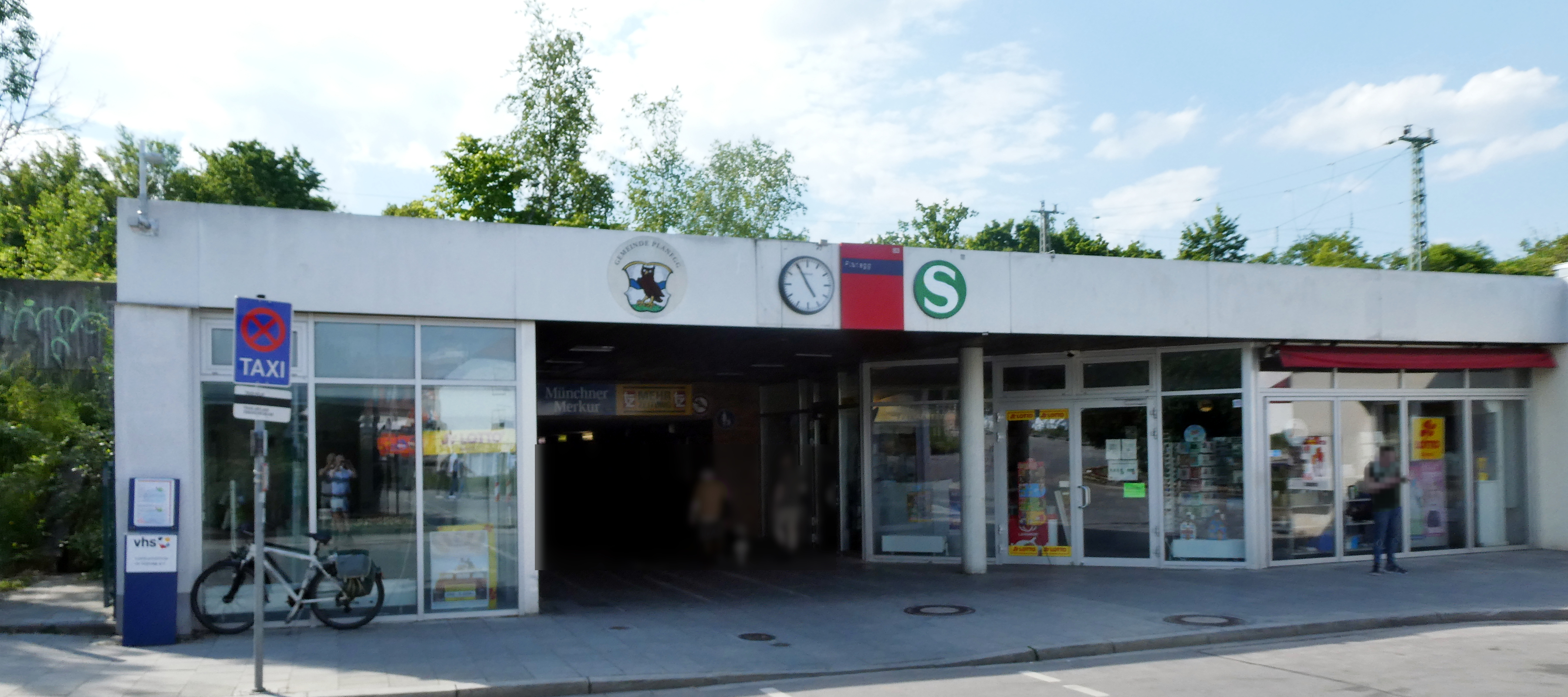
- The station entrance in 2021

General information
- Location: Bahnhofstr. 46; Planegg, Bavaria; Germany
- Coordinates: 48°06′19″N 11°24′49″E
- Owner: DB Netz
- Operator: DB Station&Service
- Lines: Munich–Garmisch-Partenkirchen line (KBS 960)
- Distance: 14.2 km (8.8 mi) from München Hauptbahnhof
- Platforms: 1 island platform
- Tracks: 2
- Train operators: S-Bahn München
- Connections: 258, 260, 265, 266, 856, 906, 967, 968, X208

Other information
- Station code: 4949
- DS100 code: MPL
- IBNR: 8004827
- Category: 4
- Fare zone: : M and 1

Services
Preceding station	Munich S-Bahn	Following station
Stockdorf towards Tutzing	S6	Gräfelfing towards Ebersberg
Location

Planegg station (German: Bahnhof Planegg) is a railway station in the municipality of Planegg, in Bavaria, Germany. It is located on the Munich–Garmisch-Partenkirchen railway of Deutsche Bahn.

== Services ==
As of the December 2021 timetable change, the following services stop at Planegg:

- Munich S-Bahn S6: service every twenty minutes between Tutzing and Grafing Bahnhof; some trains continue from Grafing Bahnhof to Ebersberg.
