= MorphoSys =

German biopharmaceutical company

MorphoSys AG
- Company type: Public
- Traded as: FWB: MOR; Nasdaq: MOR
- Industry: Biotechnology
- Founded: 1992; 34 years ago
- Headquarters: Planegg, Upper Bavaria, Germany
- Key people: Dr. Jean-Paul Kress (CEO); Sung Lee (CFO); Dr. Malte Peters (Chief Research & Development Officer); Dr. Roland Wandeler (CCO); Dr. Marc Cluzel (chairman of Supervisory Board)
- Products: Immunotherapy
- Revenue: €327.7 million (2020)
- Operating income: €27.4 million (2020)
- Net income: €97.9 million (2020)
- Total assets: €1,659.5 million (end 2020)
- Total equity: €621.3 million (end 2020)
- Number of employees: 615 (end 2020)
- Parent: Novartis
- Website: morphosys.com

MorphoSys AG is a German biopharmaceutical company founded in 1992. The company is headquartered near Munich, Germany, and has a wholly owned subsidiary, MorphoSys US Inc., in Boston, Massachusetts, in the US. The company has various antibody, protein and peptide technologies that it uses to discover and develop both proprietary and partnered drug candidates. The company has more than 100 drugs in its wider pipeline that are being investigated as treatments for a variety of diseases. While many of these are being developed in partnership with pharma and biotech companies, MorphoSys also has a proprietary pipeline with a focus on cancer and autoimmune diseases.

MorphoSys AG was listed on the Frankfurt Stock Exchange and on the US Nasdaq stock exchange. Novartis agreed to acquire the company in February 2024.

== History ==
The company was founded in 1992. In 1999, MorphoSys listed on the Frankfurt Stock Exchange under the ticker symbol "MOR".

In 2004, MorphoSys and Novartis entered into a strategic partnership for the research and development of biopharmaceuticals, which was expanded in 2007. Additional discovery partnerships included: Bayer (1999), Roche (2000), Centocor (now Janssen Biotech, 2000), Schering AG (2001) and Pfizer (2003).

In 2008, the company's first proprietary antibody, MOR103 (now otilimab), entered clinical development. Following the publication of promising results in rheumatoid arthritis, MorphoSys signed a license agreement with GlaxoSmithKline for otilimab. In 2019, GlaxoSmithKline initiated a phase 3 clinical development program with otilimab (now GSK3196165).

In 2010, MorphoSys signed a license agreement with Xencor Inc. for MOR208 (now tafasitamab).

In July 2017, the first of MorphoSys’ platform drugs received US marketing approval. Guselkumab (brand name Tremfya), which was developed and is being commercialized by Janssen Biotech, a subsidiary of Johnson & Johnson, was first approved for the treatment of moderate-to-severe plaque psoriasis in the United States, the European Union and Canada.

In April 2018, following a US initial public offering in which the company raised $239 million, American depositary shares of MorphoSys began trading on the Nasdaq stock exchange under the symbol "MOR."

In 2018, the company established a wholly owned US subsidiary, MorphoSys US Inc.

In December 2019, based on positive clinical trial results, the company submitted a Biologics License Application (BLA) to the FDA for tafasitamab in combination with lenalidomide for the treatment of relapsed/refractory diffuse large B-cell lymphoma. The submission was accepted for filing in February 2020, and a decision on the filing is expected in August 2020.

In January 2020, MorphoSys and Incyte Corporation signed a collaboration and license agreement for the global development and commercialization of tafasitamab. On March 3, 2020, the agreement received antitrust clearance and thus became effective.

In March 2020, MorphoSys announced that the FDA had accepted the Biologics License Application (BLA) for filing and granted priority review for tafasitamab, setting a Prescription Drug User Fee Act (PDUFA) goal date of August 30, 2020.

On July 31, 2020, Monjuvi (tafasitamab-cxix) was approved by the U.S. FDA in combination with lenalidomide for the medical treatment of adult patients with relapsed or refractory diffuse large B-cell lymphoma (DLBCL) not otherwise specified, including DLBCL arising from low grade lymphoma, and who are not eligible for autologous stem cell transplant (ASCT).

In June 2021, MorphoSys announced its acquisition of clinical stage biotechnology company Constellation Pharma for US$1.7 billion.

In February 2024, Novartis agreed to acquire MorphoSys for €2.7 billion. In June 2024, MorphoSys announced its intention to delist from the Frankfurt Stock Exchange and merge into Novartis. The merger was approved in August 2024.

== Pipeline ==
As of December 2020, MorphoSys had 116 drug candidates which are developed by MorphoSys and other pharmaceutical companies, 28 of which were in clinical development. Two antibodies developed by MorphoSys have already been approved and are currently being marketed.

Tafasitamab (MOR208) is a humanized monoclonal antibody directed against CD19 in clinical development for the treatment of B-cell malignancies. Tafasitamab is being evaluated in several clinical trials, alone and in combination with other anti-cancer drugs.

Felzartamab (MOR202) is a humanized monoclonal antibody directed against CD38 for the treatment of anti-PLA2R-positive membranous nephropathy, an autoimmune disease affecting the kidneys. In 2017, MorphoSys entered into a regional licensing agreement with I-Mab Biopharma to develop and commercialize Felzartamab (called TJ202 by I-Mab) in Greater China. Felzartamab is currently under investigation by I-Mab in three clinical trials.

Otilimab (MOR103/GSK3196165) is a fully human monoclonal antibody directed against GM-CSF. The program is outlicensed to GlaxoSmithKline. Otilimab is currently under investigation in a Phase 3 trial in rheumatoid arthritis that started in July 2019.

On March 2, 2023, MorphoSys announced that the company would end its preclinical research programs and cease all related activities. It stated that challenges in the pharmaceutical market forced it to optimize its cost structure and to focus all resources on oncology products in the mid to late stage of development.

== Technology ==
MorphoSys has discovered a number of antibody technologies that are used for drug development. Its main technology is HuCAL (Human Combinatorial Antibody Library), which is a collection of more than ten billion fully human antibodies in the form of a phage display bank and a system for their optimization.

Another technology recently developed is the OkapY bispecific antibody technology, which is a proprietary “2+1” bispecific antibody format with the physicochemical properties to simplify the development and large-scale production of such molecules.
