= List of polling organizations =

This is a list of notable polling organizations by country. All the major television networks, alone or in conjunction with the largest newspapers or magazines, in virtually every country with elections, operate their own versions of polling operations, in collaboration or independently through various applications.

Several organizations try to monitor the behavior of polling firms and the use of polling and statistical data, including the Pew Research Center and, in Canada, the Laurier Institute for the Study of Public Opinion and Policy.

== Australia ==
- ACNielsen – formerly published in Fairfax Media newspapers, withdrawn in 2014
- Essential Media Communications – formerly published on Crikey website, now in Guardian Australia
- DemosAU - Pollster and market research firm, publishes political and issue based polling across media outlets, specialises in MRP modelling and Conversational AI research.
- Galaxy Research – now part of YouGov
- Ipsos Australia – published in Nine Entertainment's newspapers, Sydney Morning Herald, The Age and the Australian Financial Review, but withdrew from political polling after an unpredicted result in the 2019 election, although continues the relationship with other polls
- Newspoll – published in News Corp Australia's The Australian newspaper
- Pyxis Polling and Insights - Contracted to conduct Newspoll for the Australian, also conducts internal polling for the Australian Labor Party and corporate clients.
- ReachTEL – used by Nine Entertainment for single-seat and state election polling
- Roy Morgan – published online and given away
- UComms, which has links to unions ACTU and CFMMEU – formerly used by Fairfax, then by Nine Entertainment for single-seat and state elections
- YouGov – published in News Corp Australia's Weekly Times

== Brazil ==
- IBOPE (Instituto Brasileiro de Opinião Pública e Estatística) which acronym has become the Brazilian household word for TV audience rating and a slang word that indicates that a meeting or similar function had significant attendance.
- OPUS Research

== Canada ==
- Abacus Data
- EKOS Research Associates
- Environics Research Group
- Forum Research
- Ipsos-Reid
- Léger Marketing
- Mainstreet Research
- Nanos Research
- Pollara

== France ==
- Harris Insights & Analytics
- Institut français d'opinion publique
- Ipsos
- Kantar TNS
- Médiamétrie
- BVA
- CSA
- Odoxa
- Elabe

== Germany ==
- Allensbach Institute
- Forsa institute
- Infratest dimap

== Iran ==
- Ayandeh – closed in 2002 and director Abbas Abdi arrested

== Malaysia ==
- Merdeka Center
- IDE Research Centre @ Institut Darul Ehsan (IDE)

== Mexico ==
- Ipsos
- Rubrum

== New Zealand ==
- Colmar Brunton
- Verian
- Roy Morgan International
- Ipsos
- Reid Research
- Freshwater Strategy
- Anacta
- Curia

== Philippines ==
- Pulse Asia
- Social Weather Stations
- OCTA Research

== Ukraine ==
- Kyiv International Institute of Sociology
- Rating (sociological group)
- Razumkov Centre A policy think tank also widely published throughout Ukraine
- Research & Branding Group, widely published throughout Ukraine and Internationally. Works include exit polls and regular surveys of the public's political opinions

== United Kingdom ==
- ComRes, retained pollster for the BBC and The Independent
- ICM
- Ipsos MORI (formerly MORI)
- Populus, official The Times pollster
- Qriously
- Survation, previously pollster to The Mail on Sunday, Daily Mirror, Daily Record and Sky News
- Kantar Group
- YouGov

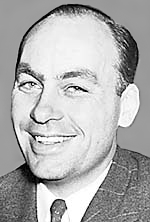
George Gallup, pioneer of survey sampling techniques

== United States ==
Statistician Nate Silver, formerly of FiveThirtyEight, maintained a list of pollsters who conduct surveys in U.S. political elections and assigns each pollster a rating based on its methodology and historical accuracy. Silver also lists the number of polls analyzed for each pollster.

- Cygnal
- Elway Research
- Emerson College Polling
- Field Research Corporation (Field Poll) – see Mervin Field
- Franklin Pierce University Polling
- Gallup Poll
- Harris Insights & Analytics
- Ipsos
- Marist Institute for Public Opinion
- Monmouth University Polling Institute
- Morning Consult
- NORC at the University of Chicago (formerly the National Opinion Research Center)
- Nielsen ratings
- Patriot Polling
- Pew Research Center
- Public Policy Institute of California
- Public Policy Polling
- Quinnipiac University Polling Institute
- Rasmussen Reports
- Research 2000 (defunct)
- Siena Research Institute at Siena University
- St. Norbert College Strategic Research Institute (Wisconsin Survey)
- Suffolk University Political Research Center (SUPRC)
- SurveyMonkey
- SurveyUSA
- Susquehanna Polling & Research
- Trafalgar Group
- University of Massachusetts Lowell Center for Public Opinion
- University of New Hampshire Survey Center (Granite State Poll)
- YouGov
- Zogby International

== See also ==
- National Election Pool (United States)
