= Northwest Biotherapeutics =

Development-stage American pharmaceutical company

NorthWest Biotherapeutics, Inc.
- Type: Public
- Traded as: Nasdaq: NWBO
- Industry: Pharmaceuticals
- Founded: January 1, 1998; 28 years ago
- Headquarters: Bethesda, Maryland
- Products: DCVax Brain; DCVax Prostate; See more complete products listing.
- Website: nwbio.com

Northwest Biotherapeutics, Inc. is a development-stage American pharmaceutical company headquartered in Maryland that focuses on developing immunotherapies against different types of cancer. It was founded in 1996 by Alton L. Boynton.

== Business model ==
Northwest has relied upon the contract manufacturing organization Cognate Bioservices for services supporting manufacture of its products for clinical trials. Their relationship with Cognate began before 2007, and was slated to extend through the first quarter of 2016. Due to cash flow issues common to development-stage companies, Northwest compensates Cognate through a combination of cash payments and stock. Cognate has also provided Northwest with at least one short-term loan, provided and paid in mid-2013. As of 2014, Northwest's expanding clinical trials have led to an increased reliance on Cognate's services, and subsequent renegotiation of their agreement.

== Technology ==
The DCVax technology upon which NWBO's therapies rely involves injecting cancer patients with dendritic cells which have been harvested from them by leukapheresis (i.e., they are "autologous") and activated by incubating them in vitro with tissue from the patient's tumour. The dendritic cells thereby identify the antigenic make-up of the tumour after which the activated dendritic cells are injected subcutaneously into the patients in aliquots at intervals. Alternatively, in a process still under development, the harvested dendritic cells are injected directly into the tumour where they are activated in situ with the same result. The activated dendritic cells pass information to generations of "killer" T-cells and B-cells so that those immune cells can recognise and attack the tumourous tissue wherever it may be found.

=== Dendritic cells ===
Discovered in 1973 at Rockefeller University by Dr. Ralph Steinman, dendritic cells act as the "general" for the adaptive immune system. They educate and direct T-cells and other immune system cells to mount an immune response to cancer cells. The basic principle behind the therapy is that if one injects or creates a large enough number of dendritic cells carrying mutant proteins matching a cancer, they excite enough T-cells and B-cells to overwhelm the cancer's defenses.

=== DCVax-L ===
DCVax-L is a solid-tumour cancer therapy for newly diagnosed glioblastoma multiforma, or GBM, a common and aggressive form of brain cancer. The five-year survival rate for GBM using current standard of care is 5%. The phase III trial sites include over 80 medical institutions in the U.S., Canada, Germany and the U.K. The results of the trial were peer reviewed and published in the Journal of American Medical Association: Oncology in November 2022. The trial showed a meaningful increase in survival for both newly diagnosed and recurrent GBM patients. For newly diagnosed the median overall survival was 19.3 months vs. 16.5 months in the external control group. The 60-month survival rate was 13% vs. 5.7%. For recurrent GBM the mean overall survival rate was markedly higher at 13.2% vs 7.8%. Over 2,100 doses of DCVax-L were administered with only five serious adverse events.

In this variation of the DCVax line, the tumour is removed through surgery, and some of the tumour presented to the aforementioned dendritic cells for the scavenging of tumor proteins. These dendritic cells, laden with tumour protein antigens, are then injected under the skin near lymph nodes. The dendritic cells then travel to the local lymph node where the dendritic cells present the proteins to the T- and B-cells, as previously described.

These dendritic cells are grown in the lab from stem cells extracted from the patient's blood. Only a sugar-cube-sized sample of the tumour is needed for subsequent presentation to the dendritic cells. The tumour sample is first broken down into constituent proteins using a caustic process known as lysing (thus the L in the name DCVax-L). After the resulting "tumor lysate" is presented to the dendritic cells, they are ready for subcutaneous injection near the selected lymph node(s). (There are approximately 500 lymph nodes in the body; most are peripheral, some are internal.)

=== DCVax-Direct ===
DCVax-Direct, is the latest addition to Northwest Bio's DCVax line. It does not require removal of the tumour, making it ideal for inoperable tumours, if proven effective. It is currently in phase I testing on patients with inoperable tumours of a very large range of cancer types.

In the procedure, dendritic cells are developed as in DCVax-L, prior to antigen exposure/"pulsing". However, the subsequent exposure to tumour antigens does not occur in vitro but in vivo: The prepared dendritic cells, along with adjuncts, are injected directly into one or more tumours.

At least two adjuncts are added to the dendritic cells. One adjunct excites a general aspect of the body's immune response; another excites a more tumor-specific response. This mixture is then injected into the patient's tumour. There, the dendritic cells are expected to scavenge tumour proteins, then find their way to the local lymph node for presentation of the tumour protein antigens to T-cells and B-cells. The activated T- and B-cells then travel to the tumour and kill tumour cells. Ruptured tumour cells release more mutant proteins that are picked up by dendritic cells and other immune cells and are carried to the lymph nodes to excite still more B- and T-cells. Theoretically, this cycle repeats, accelerates, then levels off at a high but safe level. The phase 1 trial that finished enrollment in July 2014 seeks to confirm this. As of July 2026, Northwest Bio reports phase I and II trials still under way.

DCVax-L and DCVax-Direct, if effective, could address virtually all forms of solid tumor cancers, operable and inoperable, with the possible exception of prostate cancer.

== Products ==
DCVax-L: As of March 2025, phase III trials for treatment of glioblastoma completed, and Northwest Bio had submitted a marketing authorization application in the United Kingdom, as yet unapproved.

DCVax-Direct: As of 2026, this therapy to treat inoperable solid tumours is in phase I and II trials in the US.

DCVax-Prostate: Reportedly finished phase II trials and approved for phase III trials in the US; listed as "withdrawn" on ClinicalTrials.gov.
