= MediGene =

Medigene AG
- Type: Stock company
- Traded as: MDG1
- Industry: Biotechnology
- Founded: 1994
- Headquarters: Martinsried, Germany
- Key people: Selwyn Ho (CEO), Prof Dolores J Schendel (CSO), Gerd Zettlmeissl (Chairman of the supervisory board)
- Website: www.medigene.com

Medigene AG (FSE: MDG1, ISIN DE000A1X3W00, Prime Standard) is a publicly listed biotechnology company headquartered in Martinsried near Munich, Germany. Medigene is working on the development of immunotherapies to enhance T cell activity against solid cancers. The first product candidates are in clinical development.

== History ==
Medigene is a German biotechnology company founded in 1994 as a spin-off from the Munich Gene Center. In 2000, the company went public with an initial public offering on the Frankfurt Stock Exchange. In the following years, Medigene acquired several other biotechnology companies, including NeuroVir and Avidex, and received regulatory approval for its cancer drug Eligard in Germany. In 2006, Medigene's product Veregen became the first FDA-approved biopharmaceutical from a German biotech company in the United States.

In 2012-2014, Medigene underwent strategic repositioning through the sale of Eligard, EndoTAG, and RhuDex. The company then shifted its focus to immuno-oncology with the acquisition of Trianta Immunotherapies, which was renamed Medigene Immunotherapies. In 2015, Medigene started a Phase I/II clinical trial with its DC vaccine (FDC101) to treat acute myeloid leukemia. The following year, the company entered into a strategic partnership with bluebird bio in cancer immunotherapy.

In 2017, Medigene disposed of the US rights for Veregen and expanded its partnership with bluebird bio in 2018. The company also started a Phase I/II study of its drug MDG1011 in acute myeloid leukemia and myelodysplastic syndrome. In 2019, Medigene partnered with Roivant and Sinovant to launch Cytovant Sciences, which focuses on developing cellular therapies in Asia. The same year, Medigene sold its remaining rights and inventories for Veregen.

In 2020, the company published topline data from its DC vaccine trial, and in 2021, it published topline data from the Phase I/II study of MDG1011. In 2022, Medigene entered into a comprehensive research and development partnership with BioNTech.
