= Gräfelfing =

- Municipality
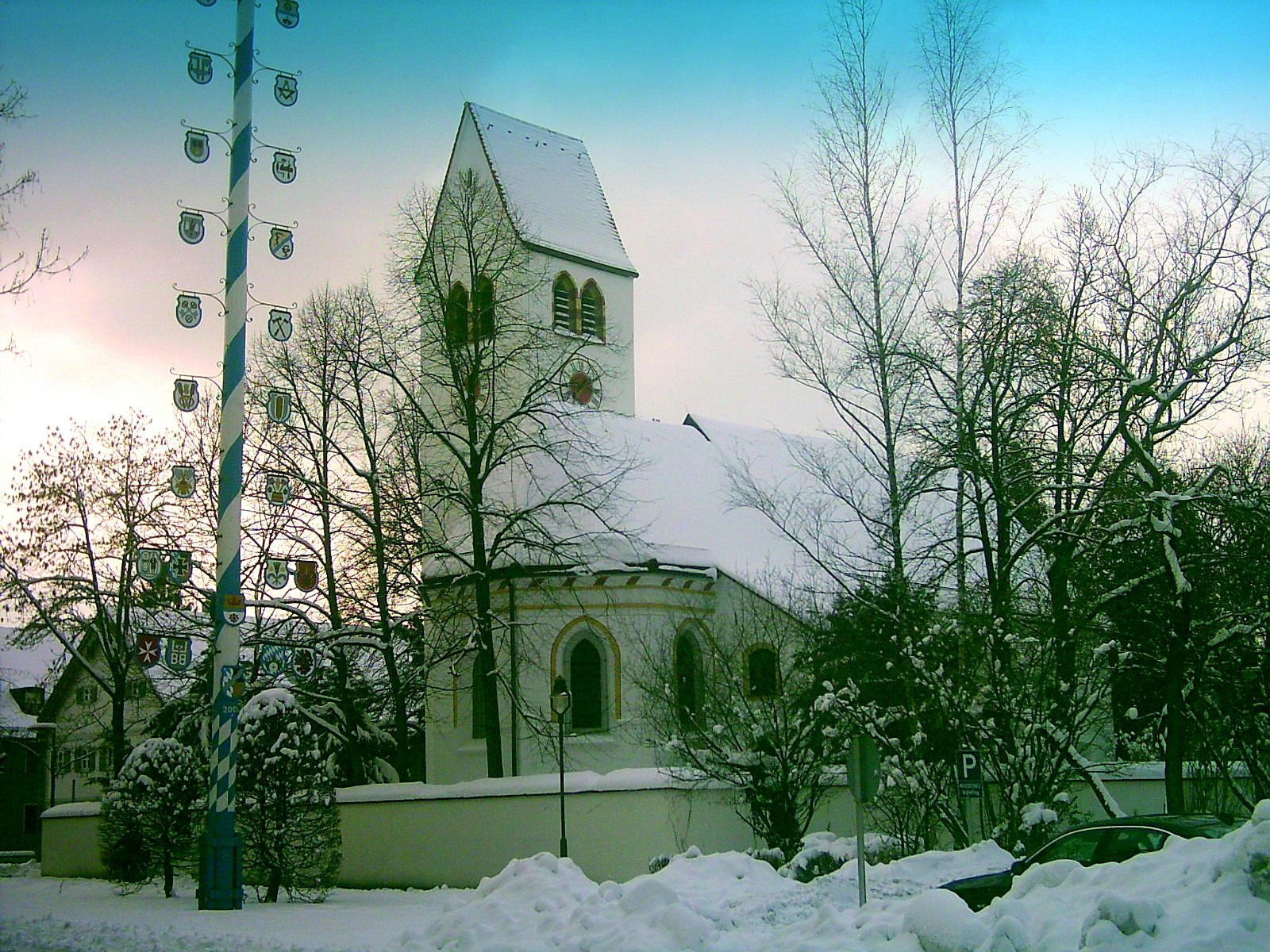
- Church of Saint Stephan

- Coat of arms

- Location of Gräfelfing within Munich district
- Interactive map of Gräfelfing
- Location within Germany Location within Bavaria
- Coordinates: 48°7′8″N 11°25′44″E
- Country: Germany
- State: Bavaria
- Admin. region: Upper Bavaria
- District: Munich
- Subdivisions: 2 municipality districts (Gräfelfing, Lochham)

Government
  - Mayor (2020–26): Peter Köstler (CSU)

Area
  - Total: 9.58 km^{2} (3.70 sq mi)
- Elevation: 540 m (1,770 ft)

Population (2025-12-31)
  - Total: 13,395
  - Density: 1,400/km^{2} (3,620/sq mi)
- Time zone: UTC+01:00 (CET)
  - Summer (DST): UTC+02:00 (CEST)
- Postal codes: 82166
- Dialling codes: 089
- Vehicle registration: M
- Website: www.graefelfing.de

Gräfelfing (German pronunciation: [ˈɡʁɛːfl̩fɪŋ]) is a municipality in the district of Munich, in Bavaria, Germany. It is located 1 km west of Munich.

The name "Gräfelfing" first appears as "Grevolvinga", which as per one hypothesis could possibly name a tribe leader named "grey wolf" ("*Grevol" -> German "grau(er)" -> English "grey"; "*vinga" -> German "Wolf" -> English "wolf").

Gräfelfing is ranked 5th of the wealthiest municipalities in Germany (2021).

== Transport ==
The municipality has two railway stations: Gräfelfing and Lochham. Both are served by the Munich S-Bahn.

== People ==
- Rainer Kraft (born 1974), politician
- Thomas Gottschalk (born 1950), entertainer and television host
- Vanessa Hafenbrädl (born 1979), light artist
- Julia Post (born 1989), politician

== Clubs ==
Among the oldest associations in the Würmtal Valley village of Graefelfing is the Literary Society, founded in 1921 in the echo of Germany’s lost war to sustain local cultural life for the once well-to-do residents. In 2011, former Federal President Joachim Gauck was among its most notable speakers.
