= List of people from Munich =

The following is a list of people from Munich, Bavaria, Germany.

== Academia ==
- Ernst Otto Fischer (1918–2007), chair of inorganic chemistry at Technical University of Munich, and recipient of the Nobel Prize in Chemistry in 1973
- Abraham Fraenkel (1891–1965), dean of mathematics at the Hebrew University of Jerusalem
- Blake R. Van Leer, United States Army officer and president of Georgia Institute of Technology
- Wassily Leontief (1905–1999), professor of economics at Harvard University, awarded the Nobel Memorial Prize in Economic Sciences in 1973
- Ernst Mach, chair of experimental physics at Charles-Ferdinand University
- Marsilius of Padua, rector of the University of Paris, forerunner of the Protestant reformation
- Willibald Sauerländer, art historian; director of the Zentralinstitut für Kunstgeschichte
- Franz Widnmann (1846–1910), painter and graphic artist, was a professor at the Royal School of Applied Arts in Munichf
- Heinrich Otto Wieland, professor at the Technical University of Munich and the University of Freiburg; recipient of the Nobel Prize in Chemistry

== Art ==
- Max Emanuel Ainmiller (1807–1870), painter
- Willy Bogner (born 1942), fashion designer and director of photography
- Friedrich Brugger (1815–1870), sculptor
- Hubert Haider (1879–1971), painter
- Alice Halicka, painter
- Richard Hallgarten (1905–1932), painter, graphic artist, book illustrator and author of children's literature
- Wassily Kandinsky (1866–1944), painter
- Franz von Lenbach, painter
- Franz Marc (1880–1916), painter
- Rudolph Moshammer (1940–2005), fashion designer
- David Dalhoff Neal, painter
- Heinrich Spiess (1832–1875), painter
- Karl von Piloty (1826–1886), painter
- Robert Hermann Raudner (1854–1915), landscape and genre painter, and etcher, lived and died at Schleißheim, and trained at the Royal Academy of Fine Arts
- Hannes Rosenow, painter
- Yaakov Rosner (1902–1950), photographer
- Christopher Ross (1931–2023), sculptor, designer and collector
- Joseph Karl Stieler (1781–1858), royal court painter
- Alexander Strähuber or Straehuber (1814–1882), history painter and book illustrator.
- Franz von Stuck, painter and sculptor
- Vardges Sureniants, painter

== Business ==
- Jeannette zu Fürstenberg (b. 1982), businesswoman and entrepreneur
- Gertraud Gruber (1921–2022), beautician and businesswoman
- Carl Alexander von Martius (1838–1920), founder of the company Aktiengesellschaft für Anilinfabrikation (now called Agfa)
- Willy Messerschmitt, German aircraft designer and manufacturer

== Entertainment ==
- Herbert Achternbusch (1938–2022), film director
- Percy Adlon (1935–2024), film director
- Jo Baier (born 1949), film director, writer
- Briana Banks (born 1978), porn actress
- Moritz Bleibtreu (born 1971), actor
- Harry Buckwitz (1904–1987), actor, theatre director and theatre manager
- Gedeon Burkhard (born 1969), actor
- Manfred Eicher, record producer and founder of ECM Records
- Rainer Werner Fassbinder (1945–1982), film director
- Frida Felser (1872–1941), opera singer and actress.
- Andy Fetscher (born 1980), film director, cinematographer and screenplay writer
- Maria Furtwängler (born 1966), actress
- Therese Giehse (1898–1975), actress
- Michael Haneke (born 1942), filmmaker and writer
- Michael Herbig (born 1968), comedian, actor and filmmaker
- Werner Herzog (born 1942), film director
- Brigitte Horney, actress (Münchhausen)
- Curd Jürgens (1915–1982), actor
- Rick Kavanian (born 1971), actor and comedian
- Renate Müller (1906–1937), actress
- Max Neal (1865–1941), dramatist
- Christine Neubauer (born 1962), actress
- Uschi Obermaier (born 1946), sex symbol of the late sixties
- Lola Randl (born 1980), film director and screenwriter
- Wolfgang Reitherman (1909–1985), animator and director of Disney movies
- Helmut Ringelmann (1926–2011), film producer and film director
- Jeri Ryan (born 1968), actress
- Till Schmerbeck (born 1969), film producer
- Max Schreck, actor
- Julia Stegner (born 1984), top model
- Christian Tramitz (born 1955), actor and comedian
- Karl Valentin (1882–1948), comedian, author and film producer
- Fritz Wepper (born 1941), actor
- Nico Liersch (born 2000), actor

== Music ==
- Lou Bega (born 1975), singer-songwriter
- Carmela Corren,(1938–2022), singer and actress
- Harold Faltermeyer (born 1952), composer and record producer
- Julia Fischer (born 1983), classical violinist and pianist
- Max Greger (1926–2015), musician, saxophonist, big band bandleader and conductor
- Asger Hamerik, composer
- Joey Heindle (born 1993), DSDS participant in season 9.
- Jonas Kaufmann (born 1969), operatic tenor
- Franzl Lang (1930–2015), Bavarian yodeller
- Orlande de Lassus, composer
- Lubomyr Melnyk (born 1948), composer and pianist
- Nick Menza (1964–2016), Megadeth drummer
- Freddie Mercury, lead singer of Queen
- Robert Merwald (born 1971), operatic baritone
- Giorgio Moroder, composer, songwriter, and record producer
- Brent Mydland (1952–1990), Grateful Dead keyboardist
- Charles Oberthür (1819–1895), composer
- Carl Orff (1895–1982), composer
- Lucia Popp, opera singer
- Max Reger, composer, organist, pianist and conductor
- Wolfgang Sawallisch (1923–2013), conductor and pianist
- Ralph Siegel (born 1945), composer
- Richard Strauss (1864–1949), composer
- Donna Summer (1948–2012), singer, known as the "Queen of Disco"
- Richard Wagner (1813–1883), composer

== Literature and journalism ==
- Vera F. Birkenbihl (1946–2011), facilitator and non-fiction writer
- Hans Magnus Enzensberger (1929–2022), author
- Lion Feuchtwanger (1884–1958), writer
- Bettina Gaus (1956–2021), journalist
- Muhammad Iqbal, poet, who received his PhD from Munich in 1907
- Erich Kästner, author
- Golo Mann (1909–1994), writer
- Klaus Mann (1906–1949), writer
- Thomas Mann (1875–1955), Nobel Prize-winning author
- Eugen Roth (1895–1976), writer
- Dieter Kronzucker (born 1936), journalist
- Maria von Welser (born 1946), journalist
- Steffen Seibert (born 1960), journalist
- Sandra Maischberger (born 1966), journalist
- Angie Westhoff (born 1965), children's author
- Marcel Mettelsiefen (born 1978), journalist
- Fyodor Tyutchev, poet

== Nobility ==
- Elisabeth of Bavaria (1837–1898), Empress "Sisi" of Austria
- Isabeau of Bavaria (1371–1435), queen-consort of France
- Prince Leopold of Bavaria (1846–1930), German field marshal
- Ludwig II the Dream King, at Nymphenburg
- Ludwig III of Bavaria (1845–1921), last king of Bavaria
- Maximilian I, Elector of Bavaria (1573–1651), Elector of Bavaria
- Maximilian II of Bavaria (1811–1864), king of Bavaria
- Maximilian II Emanuel, Elector of Bavaria (1662–1726), Elector of Bavaria
- Maximilian III Joseph, Elector of Bavaria (1727–1777), Elector of Bavaria
- Otto of Bavaria (1848–1916), king of Bavaria
- Rupprecht, Crown Prince of Bavaria (1869–1955), Crown Prince of Bavaria
- Sophie, Hereditary Princess of Liechtenstein (born 1967)

== Politics ==
- Carl Amery (1922–2005), writer, environmentalist, and founding member of the German Green Party
- Stepan Bandera, Ukrainian nationalist, assassinated in October 1959
- Georg Eisenreich (born 1970), politician (CSU)
- Leon Feuchtwanger (1884–1958), writer
- Karl-Theodor zu Guttenberg (born 1971), politician (CSU)
- Heinrich Himmler (1900–1945), leading member of the Nazi Party, main perpetrator of the Holocaust
- Adolf Hitler, politician and leader of the Nazi Party
- Wilhelm Hoegner (1887–1980), politician
- Carljörg Lacherbauer (1902–1967), co-founder of the Christian Social Union (CSU), Post-war mayor and secretary of the Department of Justice
- Vladimir Lenin, Russian revolutionary
- Heinrich Müller (1900–1945), chief of the Gestapo
- Max Planck, Nobel Prize-winning physicist
- Ludwig Prandtl, father of modern aerodynamics
- Wilhelm Röntgen, Nobel Prize–winning physicist
- Fritz Schäffer (1888–1967), politician
- Wilhelm Schmid (1889–1934), SA-Gruppenführer and member of the Reichstag
- Hans Scholl, founder of the anti-Nazi White Rose
- Sophie Scholl, activist with the anti-Nazi White Rose
- Arnold Schwarzenegger, Governor of California, bodybuilder, and actor
- Franz Josef Strauss (1915–1988), Minister-President of the Free State of Bavaria
- Andrea Wolf (1965–1998), radical leftist activist with the PKK

== Religion ==
- Pope Benedict XVI, born Joseph Ratzinger, former Archbishop of Munich-Freising
- William of Ockham, Franciscan friar, scholastic philosopher and theologian

== Science and technology ==
- Uta Fritze-von Alvensleben (born 1955), astrophysicist
- Eduard Buchner (1860–1917), chemist and Nobel Prize winner
- Albert Einstein (1879–1955), Nobel Prize-winning physicist, grew up in Munich
- Christine Falk (born 1966), immunologist
- Roger C. Field, inventor, industrial designer
- Joseph von Fraunhofer, physicist and optical lens manufacturer
- Werner Heisenberg, Nobel Prize-winning physicist
- Robert Huber (born 1937), biochemist, director of the Max Planck Institute of Biochemistry, and recipient of the Nobel Prize in Chemistry
- Erich Kästner, movie camera designer
- Wolfgang Franz von Kobell (1803–1882), mineralogist and writer
- Justus von Liebig, chemist
- Feodor Lynen (1911–1979), biochemist, director of the Max Planck Institute of Biochemistry, and recipient of the Nobel Prize in Physiology or Medicine
- Franz M. Matschinsky (1931–2022), physician, pharmacologist and biochemist
- Rudolf Mössbauer (1929–2011), physicist and recipient of the Nobel Prize in Physics
- Georg Ohm, physicist
- Arno Allan Penzias (1933–2024), physicist and recipient of the Nobel Prize in Physics

== Sports ==
- Gary Allison (born 1951), soccer player
- Franz Beckenbauer (1945–2024), former footballer and honorary president of Bayern Munich
- Maxi Herber (1920–2006), figure skater
- Korbinian Holzer (born 1988), professional ice hockey defenceman currently playing for Adler Mannheim of the DEL
- Fabian Johnson (born 1987), soccer player who plays for Borussia Mönchengladbach and the United States National Team
- Philipp Lahm (born 1983), footballer who played for Bayern Munich
- Sepp Maier (born 1944), football goalkeeper
- Helene Mayer, fencer
- Gerd Müller (1945–2021), footballer
- Marcel Nguyen (born 1987), artistic gymnast
- JJ Peterka (born 2002), ice hockey player
- Christoph Schubert (born 1982), former ice hockey player who played in the NHL for the Winnipeg Jets
- Frank Shorter (born 1947), champion distance runner
- Aleksandar Pavlović (born 2004), professional footballer for Germany national team and Bayern Munich
- Bastian Schweinsteiger, footballer

== Others ==
- Andreas Baader (1943–1977), Red Army Faction leader
- Eva Braun (1912–1945), Adolf Hitler's mistress and later wife
- Franz Xaver Gabelsberger (1789–1849), inventor of the Gabelsberger shorthand writing system
- Gudrun Burwitz (1929–2018), daughter of Heinrich Himmler
- Jean Baptiste Holzmayer (1839–1890), teacher, archaeologist and folklorist
- Traudl Humps (1920–2002), Adolf Hitler's personal secretary during the Second World War
- Lola Montez, courtesan to King Ludwig I
- Amalie Nacken (1855–1940), philanthropist and activist
- E. Lee Spence (born 1947), pioneer underwater archaeologist and shipwreck historian; chief of underwater archaeology for San Andres y Providencia
