= Schliersee =

- Municipality
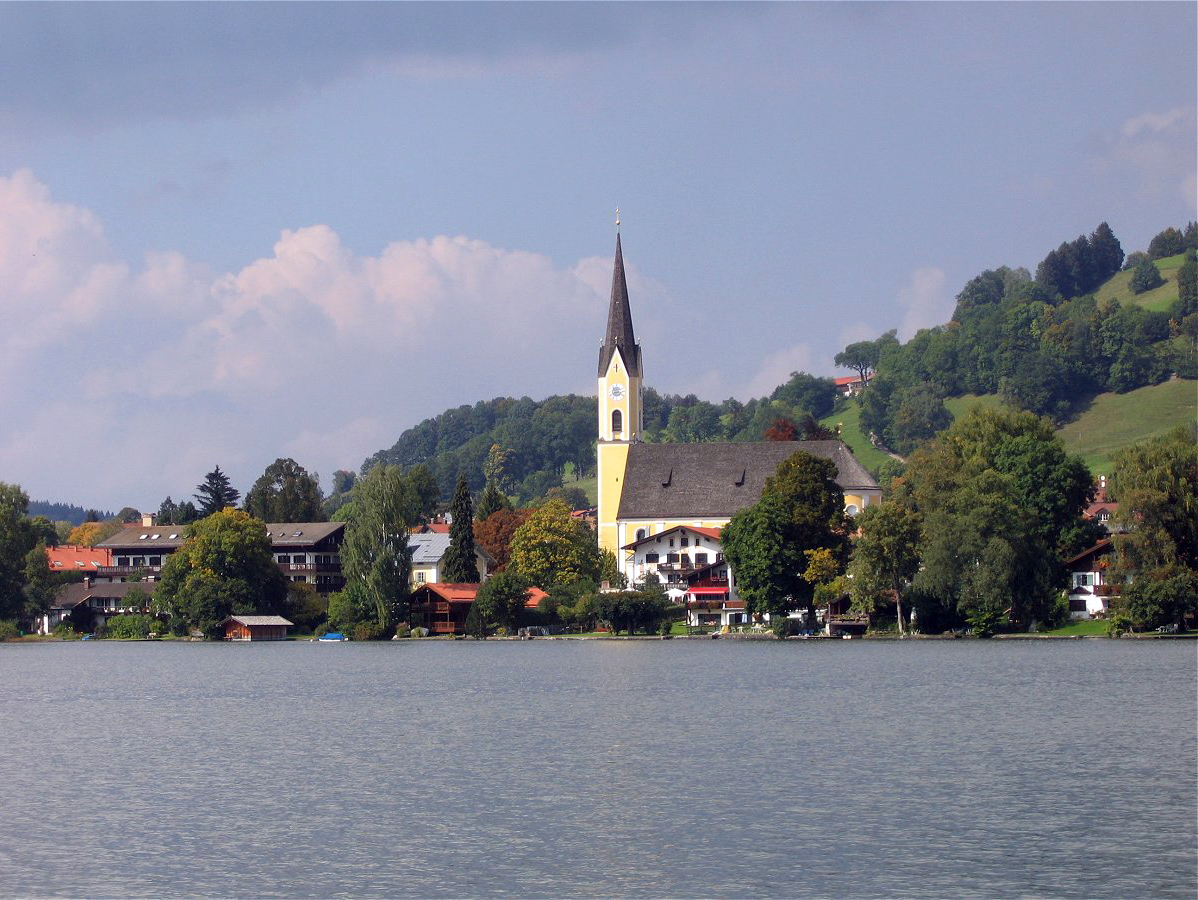
- Saint Sixtus Church

- Coat of arms

- Location of Schliersee within Miesbach district
- Interactive map of Schliersee
- Location within Germany Location within Bavaria
- Coordinates: 47°44′N 11°52′E
- Country: Germany
- State: Bavaria
- Admin. region: Oberbayern
- District: Miesbach

Government
  - Mayor (2020–26): Franz Schnitzenbaumer (CSU)

Area
  - Total: 79.14 km^{2} (30.56 sq mi)
- Elevation: 784 m (2,572 ft)

Population (2025-12-31)
  - Total: 6,668
  - Density: 84.26/km^{2} (218.2/sq mi)
- Time zone: UTC+01:00 (CET)
  - Summer (DST): UTC+02:00 (CEST)
- Postal codes: 83727
- Dialling codes: 08026
- Vehicle registration: MB
- Website: www.schliersee.de

Schliersee (German pronunciation: [ˈʃliːɐ̯zeː]) is a small town (Markt) and a municipality in the district of Miesbach in Bavaria in Germany. It is named after the nearby Lake Schliersee. It comprises the districts Schliersee (town), Westenhofen, Neuhaus, Fischhausen, Josefsthal and Spitzingsee.

Among the points of interest in Schliersee, a climatic health resort, is the St Sixtus church with a Holy Trinity group by Erasmus Grasser and wall and ceiling frescoes by Johann Baptist Zimmermann. The excellent quality of the water in the Schliersee is due in large part to the construction of a system for purifying waste water from the area surrounding the lake, which was supported by the state of Bavaria with large subsidies and low-interest loans.

== Geography ==
Schliersee is located on the northeastern shore of the lake of the same name and is a well known resort in the Bavarian Alps. Schliersee provides scenic views of the surrounding mountains, in particular Aiplspitz, Jägerkamp (German), Brecherspitz and Bodenschneid, all belonging to the Mangfallgebirge range. The Spitzingsee area is at an elevation of 1,090 meters high and is a well known winter sports and mountain hiking centre.

== Transport ==
Schliersee lies on the B307, 7 km south of Miesbach, 17 km from the motorway A8 (exit Weyarn), 32 km from Rosenheim and 53 km from the state capital Munich.

Schliersee terminal station lies on the Holzkirchen-Schliersee railway line and the Schliersee-Bayrischzell railway operated by the Bavarian Oberland Bahn. Trains run from Munich via Holzkirchen to Bayrischzell through Schliersee station and Fischhausen-Neuhaus. At peak hours, the service operates every 30 minutes (commuting) and hourly at other times.

There are regular busses to Spitzingsee with some continuing to Valepp. Buses operate via Hausham to Tegernsee (town) and from June to October to Kufstein in Tyrol via Thiersee.

== Coat of arms ==
After Schliersee was raised to 'Markt' status in 1919, the town applied for the authorisation to use the local colours of cornflower blue / gold yellow. However this encountered difficulties, since in the opinion of the Bavarian State Archives, the main colours of the Schliersee emblem are blue / white and not cornflower blue / gold yellow.

Then town then commissioned Prof. Otto Hupp, to revise the Schliersee coat of arms. On August 24, 1926, the market council approved the new coat of arms.

It had the following description:

"Pope martyr Sixtus II sitting on a Faldistorium on blue field, in golden cope with Papal tiara, offers blessing holding in his left hand lowered sword."

This new coat of arms and the local colour "cornflower blue / gold yellow" were approved by resolution of the Bavarian Ministry of the Interior of 27 November 1926.

== History ==
An act of the Prince-Bishopric of Freising on 21 January 779, confirms that five brothers founded on "Slyrse" a monastic cell, together with a small consecrated church founded by the bishop Arbeo. This monastery was on the Kirchbichl, north of the present church. During the Hungarian invasions in the tenth century it was probably destroyed by Bishop Otto of Freising, but in 1141 was refounded at the site of the present church St. Sixtus and in 1260 converted to a Collegiate church. The canons lived on small farms around the church with which they made their livelihood. In 1493/95, against the will of the canons, the Frauenkirche was moved to Munich, where in 1803 it was closed down following secularization.

From the 12th century, power over the area was vested Hohenwaldeck counts. This period also saw the decline in importance of castle Hohenwaldeck above Schliersee. In the 15th century the bishopric of Freising was given supremacy over the territory and in 1454 Imperial immediacy was given. However the main county town was Miesbach and Castle Waldeck (German). By 1483 the family of the Counts of Waldeck died out. Following inheritance disputes, the territory was eventually acquired by Wolfgang von Maxlrain (German) in 1516. The rule of Maxlrain over Schliersee lasted until 1734. Thereafter, the county and area around Schliersee passed to the Electorate of Bavaria. Over the same time, the prerogatives of the manorial church Frauenstift Munich and Maxlrain were gradually lost. Residents were able to purchase or sell, new houses were built, the population structure transformed land, and gradually a community formed. In implementing the Bavarian Constitution of 1808 through the first municipality edict, Schliersee became an independent rural community in that year. In 1919 Schliersee became a 'markt' town.

By 1880, the beginnings of industry could be seen in Schliersee. From 1867 to 1914 there was a glassworks in Breitenbach.

In the second third of the 19th century Munich artists discovered the quiet and romantic Schliersee and its reputation spread as an idyllic holiday destination. On August 1, 1869, Schliersee was connected to Munich by railway, which resulted in a boom of tourism. Trails were created, bathhouses, new restaurants and hotels and other recreational facilities were built. In 1888 the local folklore society was formed and in 1892 the Schliersee farmers theatre was formed, the first Bavarian folk theatre. In the 20th century numerous celebrities chose Schliersee as a main or second home.

In the late 1880s the Winter pleasure of skiing was brought to Schliersee Mountains. At the turn of the 20th century, Schliersee pioneered Bavarian Winter sports development. In 1902 the first official cross country ski event was organised through the village, and four years later the local ski club was created. Also in 1906 was the first "Bavarian ski championship" took place in the area around Schliersee with a distance of 25 km. The Red Cross in Schliersee suggested the birth of the mountain rescue service: A group of skiers founded there in 1911 the "first German-skiing voluntary rescue unit".

== Politics ==
=== Council ===
The council has 20 seats, since the local elections on March 16, 2014, comprising as follows:

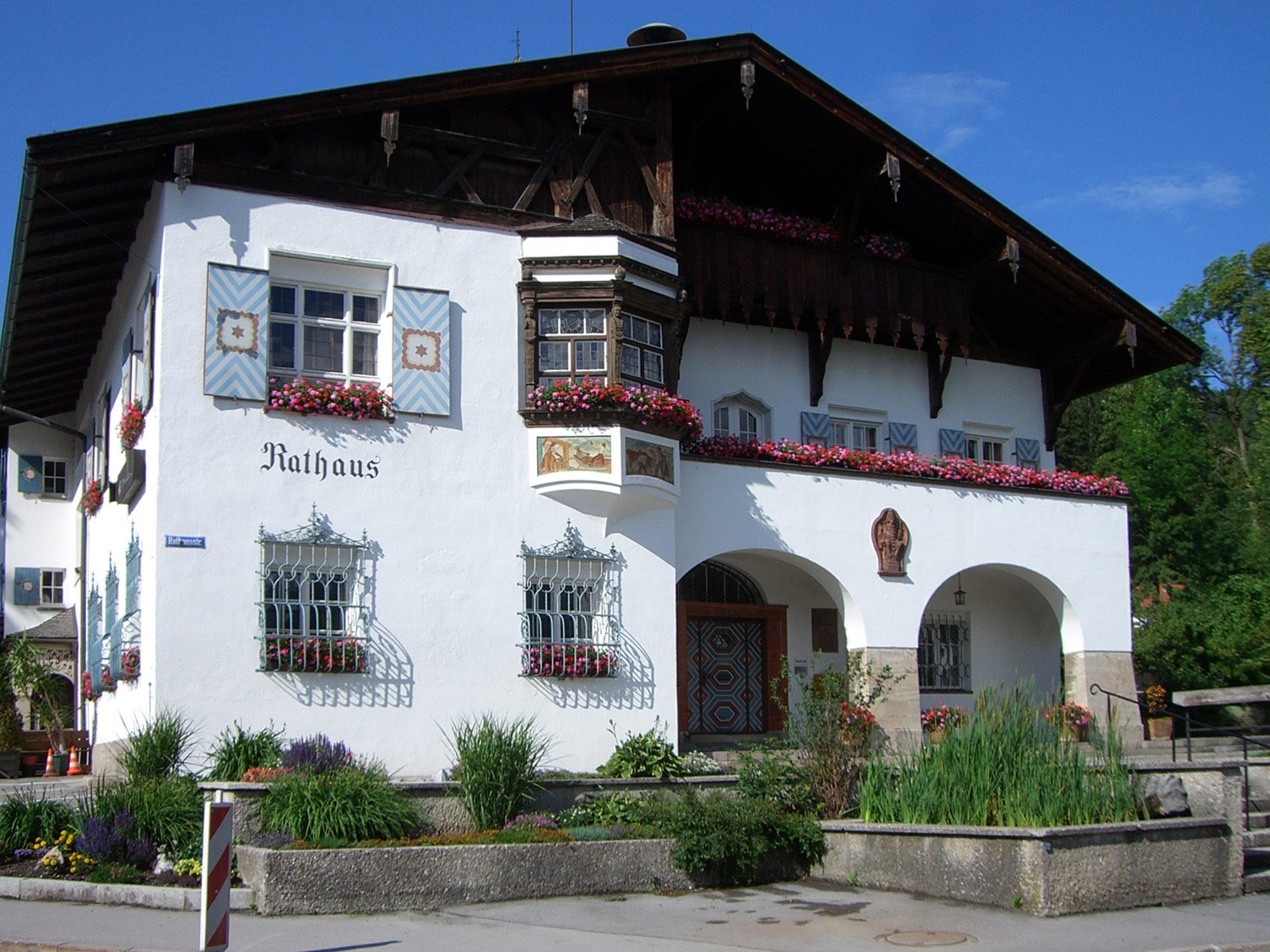
Schliersee town hall

Party / List	Share of votes	Seats
CSU	36,9 %	7
SPD	11,5 %	2
Green	14,4 %	3
Die Schlierseer	24,4 %	5
Independents	12,8 %	3
Total	100%	20
Turnout: 51,4 %

In addition, the council also has its first mayor.

=== Twin towns ===
Schliersee is partnered with the Italian Barberino Val d'Elsa in Tuscany.

== Culture and attractions ==
=== Theatre ===
The Schliersee farmers theatre (founded in 1892) is the oldest theatre of this type.

=== Museums ===
The Schliersee museum (built around 1500) shows the rural life and work over the past 500 years in one of the oldest houses in the village. In addition to the living rooms and bedrooms, an open Rauchkuchel, a court and a prison can be seen. The collection includes furniture and miscellaneous items and a collection of glass objects from the Schliersee glass works.

The Markus Wasmeiern farming and Winter Sports Museum (in German) is an outdoor museum on the southern edge of Schliersee. The museum is dedicated to rural life from the beginning of the 18th century. Old farms from upper Bavaria were dismantled, moved from their original locations then restored and rebuilt in the museum.

=== Churches and chapels ===
On the Weinberg hill stands the Gothic chapel of St. George from the 14th century with a baroque altar of 1624. On the north wall stand the figures of St. Sixtus and St. Barbara. There is a memorial plaque for the German casualties of the Battle of Annaberg in 1921. From the Weinberg there is a nice view of the town and the lake. At the northern entrance to the village is the baroque church of St. Martin containing Georg Jennerwein's grave. Finally, located in the centre, which was built in 1712–1715, there is the Parish Church St.Sixtus, with works by Jan Polak, Erasmus Grasser and Johann Baptist Zimmermann.

=== Industry ===
Schliersee is the home to the Slyrs Bavarian Malt whisky distillery.

=== Leisure ===
Since late 2008 on lakefront is the Vital world Schliersee.

=== Literature ===
The Bavarian writer Manfred Böckl wrote a novel about the famous Schliersee inhabitant and poacher George Jennerwein. The book is entitled Jennerwein.

=== Film ===
In Schliersee during September 2007, Joseph Vilsmaier filmed The Legend of Brandner Kaspar with Franz Xaver Kroetz as Brandner Kaspar and Michael Herbig as Boandlkramer. The film was released in October 2008.

== Notable people ==
- Minna Blüml (born 1920), luger
- Charlotte Dietrich (born 1935), artist
- Theodor Hummel (1864–1939), painter
- Rolf Singer (1906–1994), German-US-American Mycology and High school teacher
- Markus Wasmeier (born 1963), Skier. 1985 World slalom champion in Bormio (Italy), 1994 double Olympic champion in Lillehammer (Norway) in the super-G and giant slalom.

=== Other personalities ===
- Josef Achmann (1885–1958), painter, lived from 1940 until his death in Schliersee
- Michael Ande (1944), actor, lives in Schliersee
- Hans Rudolf Beierlein (born 1929), music manager, lives in Schliersee
- Hans Frank (1900–1946), Nazi politician, lived from 1936 in Neuhaus am Schliersee
- Gustav Berauer (1912–1986), world champion Nordic skiing in 1939, died in Schliersee
- Werner Bochmann (1900–1993), composer, lived for over 50 years until his death in Schliersee
- Albert Singer (1869–1922), German hunting and landscape painter. Lived and worked in Schliersee
- Hubert Haider (1879–1971), landscape painter, son to Karl Michael Haider, lived at times in Schliersee
- Karl Michael Haider (1846–1912), Bavarian landscape and portrait painter, lived from 1896 until his death in Schliersee
- George Jenner wine (1848–1877), legendary poacher, buried in Schliersee-west Hofen
- Anton von Perfall (1853–1912), hunting writer, lived in Schliersee. Many of his stories take place around Schliersee.
- Gerhard Polt (born 1942), Bavarian cabaret artist, lives in Schliersee.
- Xaver Terofal (1862–1940), actor, founder of Schlierseer Bauer Theatre
- Wolfgang Vogel (1925–2008), lawyer and negotiator for the GDR in the "Sale of prisoners' freedom". Following reunification lived until his death in Schliersee.
- Georg Vogelsang (1883–1952), popular actor, died in Schliersee
- Vanessa Hinz (born 1992), biathlete, grew up in Schliersee and competes for the SC Schliersee

== Regular events ==
- Ski carnival on the Firstalm (Carnival Sunday)
- Alpen-Triathlon (June / July)
- Schliersee lake festival (July / August)
- Old-Schliersee Church day (August)
- Lake festival on Spitzingsee (August)
- Leonhardifahrt (November)
- Schliersee Advent. Advent with Bavarian advent music and pastoral play (1st and 2nd Advent-Saturday)
