= Max Haider =

German illustrator (1807–1873)

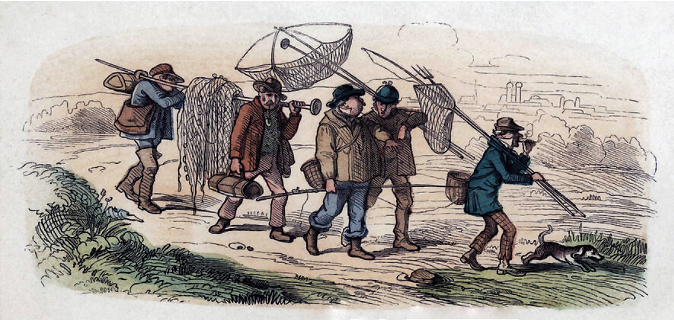
- Group going fishing by Max Haider
- Born: 21 July 1807; Biederstein
- Died: 21 June 1873 (aged 65); Munich
- Occupation: illustrator

Max Haider (21 July 1807 in Biederstein, Schwabing, Munich – 21 June 1873 in Munich) was a German huntsman, draughtsman, lithographer, cartoonist and illustrator.

He married Therese Fäßler (1811–1893), and was the father to landscape painter Karl Haider, and grandfather to painter Ernst Haider.

Haider provided hunting illustrations for the Fliegende Blätter weekly magazine and the Münchener Bilderbogen bi-weekly broadsheet. These illustrations fitted the cultural programme of Maximilian II of Bavaria's belief in reviving regional and national art to awaken a Bavarian national identity, which countered those of his father Ludwig I.

Works by Haider are in the collection of the German Hunting and Fishing Museum in Munich.
