= Hubert Haider =

German painter

- Born: 11 February 1879; Munich, Kingdom of Bavaria, German Empire
- Died: 16 August 1971 (aged 92); Altötting, Bavaria, West Germany
- Occupation: painter

Hubert Haider (1879–1971) was a German landscape painter.

Haider was born 11 February 1879 at Munich, son to the Munich painter Karl Haider and his first wife Katharina, née Brugger (died 1882), niece to the sculptor Friedrich Brugger. He was grandson of the forester draughtsman Max Haider. His half-brother, Ernst Haider, son of his father's 1890 second marriage to Ernestine Schwarz, was also a painter.

After attending the Gymnasium Dillingen (grammar school), he transferred in 1891–92 to Munich's Maximiliansgymnasium. From 1894 to 1902 he lived at the village of Eicherloh, between Munich and Erding, and from 1914 at Altötting, Schliersee and Munich. He developed an artistic relationship with the older landscape painter Edmund Steppes, and through him with his son-in-law Karl Alexander Flügel (1890–1967). He was a member of the Munich Artists' Cooperative and the Reichsverband bildender Künstler Deutschlands (Reich Association of Visual Artists). His painting was described as of a "very exact style... with an almost naïve conception of the image". He mainly chose subjects from the Upper Bavarian Alpine foothills and mountainous regions. From 1925 until 1939 he exhibited works in Munich annual exhibitions.

Haider died 16 August 1971 at Altötting.

== Selected works ==
- Der Wilde Kaiser bei Kufstein, oil on cardboard, 30 × 35 cm; signed H.Haider, label of Galerie Heinemann, Munich (art trade) # on verso.

Munich, Bavarian State Painting Collections:

- Peissenberg, oil on cardboard, 56 × 49 cm (BStGS, Inv.No. 10131).
- Salzach Valley, oil on linen, 76 × 106 cm (BStGS, Inv.No. 13033)
- Breitenstein, Autumn Landscape, oil on canvas, 78 × 94 cm (BStGS, Inv.No. 10039).

Munich, Lenbachhaus:

- Hohenpeißenberg
- Jägerkamp near Schliersee
- Spring
- Mountain forest
- The Wendelstein
- Landscape

== Bibliography ==
- Dresslers Kunsthandbuch (Dressler's Handbook of Art), 1930
- Allgemeines Lexikon der bildenden Künstler des XX. Jahrhunderts (General Encyclopaedia of the Visual Artists of the XXth Century), "Haider, Hubert", Hans Vollmer (ed.), Volume 2, E–J. E. A. Seemann, Leipzig, 1955
- "Münchner Maler im 19./20. Jahrhundert", Bruckmanns Lexikon der Münchner Maler ("Munich painters in the 19th/20th century", Bruckmann's Encyclopaedia of Munich Painters) Volume 5, Munich 1993, p. 338
- Zoller, Andreas, Der Landschaftsmaler Edmund Steppes (1873–1968) und seine Vision einer „deutschen Malerei (The Landscape Painter Edmund Steppes (1873-1968) and his Vision of a "German Painting"), dissertation, Braunschweig University of Art, 1999
- Allgemeines Künstlerlexikon (General Encyclopaedia of Artists), "Haider, Karl", Volume 68, de Gruyter, Berlin, 2010. ISBN 978-3-598-23035-6
- Weiß, Siegfried; Berufswunsch Kunst – Maler, Grafiker, Bildhauer. Ehemalige Schüler des Münchner Maximiliansgymnasiums der Jahre 1849 to 1918 (Career aspiration art –Painter, graphic artist, sculptor. Former pupils of the Maximiliansgymnasium in Munich from 1849 to 1918), Allitera Verlag, Munich, 2012, pp. 248–251. ISBN 3869064757
