= Karl Michael Haider =

German painter (1846–1912)

Karl Haider
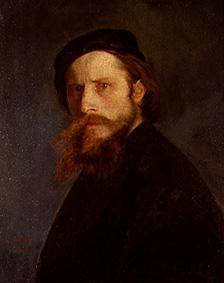
- Self-portrait (1875)
- Born: 6 February 1846; Munich
- Died: 28 October 1912 (aged 66); Schliersee
- Occupations: Landscape and portrait painter

Karl Michael Haider (1846–1912) was a Bavarian landscape and portrait painter.

== Early life and education ==
Haider was born on 6 February 1846 in Munich, the son to Max Haider (1807–1873), a forester from Anzing, and his wife Therese Fäßler (1811–1893). He was introduced to art by his father, who was also a cartoonist, and who taught him observation and drawing during forest walks.

Haider attended an arts high school in Munich, concentrating on training as a singer. While at the school he developed his interest in becoming a painter. He then entered a private painting school, after which, through the recommendation of his teachers, he attended the Munich Royal Academy of Fine Arts. While at the Academy he befriended and was influenced by Hans Thoma and Wilhelm Leibl; he joined the artistic circle around Leibl. Haider was particularly interested in the 15th- and 16th-century works of the German Albrecht Altdorfer and Hans Holbein the Elder, and the Dutch Jan van Eyck and Rogier van der Weyden.

== Career ==
When 29 years old Haider travelled to Florence where he copied and made woodcuts from old masters. There he met the symbolist painter Arnold Böcklin who invited him to his Tuscan villa. The two painters became friends despite sometimes having opposing views on art.

In the early summer of 1876 Haider returned to Munich where he became a freelance painter, although unsuccessfully. Museums and galleries rejected his paintings and only a few private commissions secured him a modest living, however, his work was appreciated by the critic Adolf Bayersdorfer. Heavily indebted, he received help from the Leibl circle, especially from Hans Thoma. In 1894, through intercession from the Academy, Haider was granted a small state pension, after which his artistic reputation and financial success increased. In 1897 his painting Autumn Evening was awarded a gold medal at the Munich International Exhibition. In following years Haider took short study trips to Austria, Hungary, and Italy; the influence of these trips were reflected in his paintings, particularly landscapes.

Haider showed three paintings as a member of the Deutscher Künstlerbund (Association of German Artists) in the 1904 Königsplatz exhibition, organized by the Munich Secessionists. The Munich Secession organised an exhibition of Haider's paintings on his birthday in 1911. He was awarded an honorary DPhil by the University of Breslau.

== Personal life ==
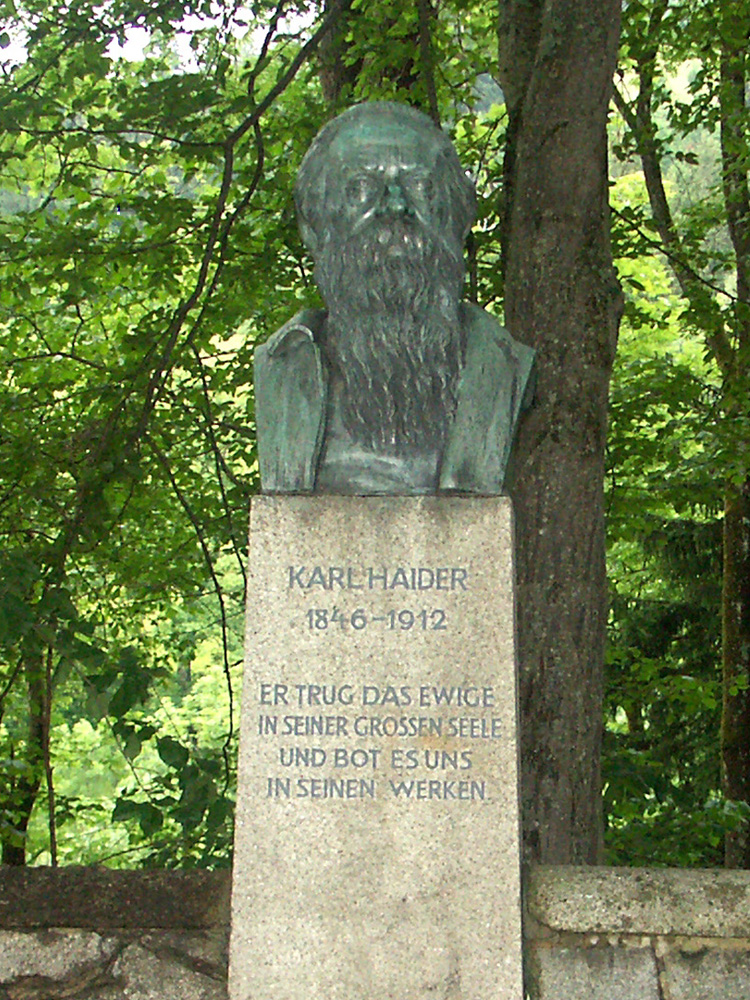
Haider Monument at Schliersee

In 1874 Haider married Katharina, niece to the sculptor Friedrich Brugger. The marriage produced two daughters and a son, the painter Hubert Haider (1879–1971). Katharina died in 1882; Haider could not raise money for the funeral which was financed by the painter Franz von Lenbach. Haider's second marriage was to Ernestine Schwarz in 1890, the same year their son, Ernst (died 1988), was born. In 1896 the family settled in Schliersee, where Haider died on 8 October 1912, age 66. His tomb was designed by the sculptor Hermann Lang. A street in Schliersee was named after him.

== Works ==
- Two girls on the meadow (1870)
- Ebenberg oak (1871)
- Self-portrait (1875)
- Portrait of Katharina Haider (1875)
- Portrait of Elise Greinwald (1877)
- Flower meadow (1878)
- The New Rifle (1880)
- Above all peaks is peace (1886)
- Moni (1888)
- At Schlierseer (1891)
- Spring landscape at Hausham (1896)
- Autumn evening (1896)
- The Ostertal with the Kienberghorn (1897)
- Dante and Beatrice (1902)
- Girl with bouquet of flowers (1904)
- Sacred Grove (1905)
- Self-portrait (1906)
- Overcast sky (1908)
- Above all peaks is peace (1912)
- Thunderscape
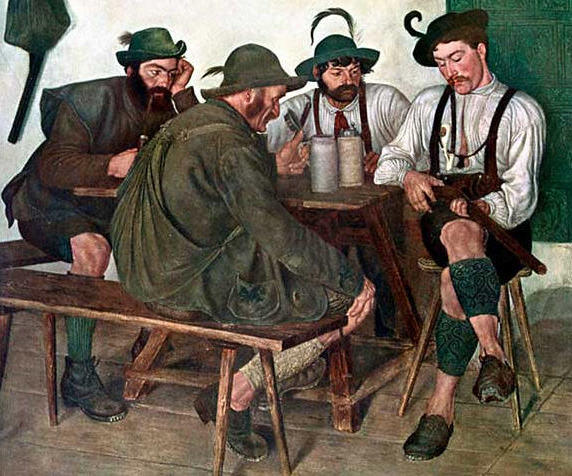
The New Rifle

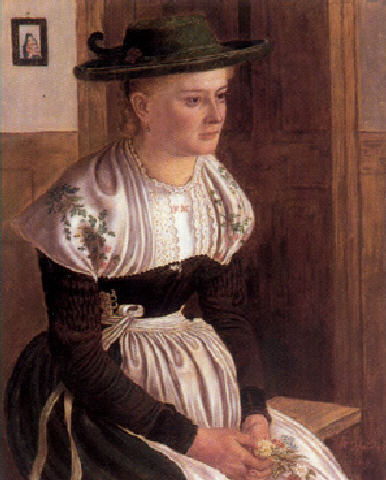
At Schlierseer

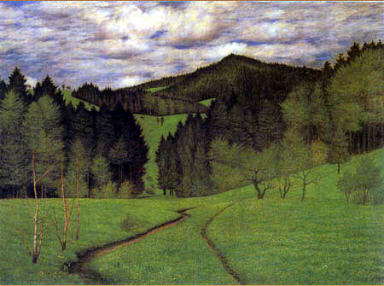
Spring landscape at Hausham

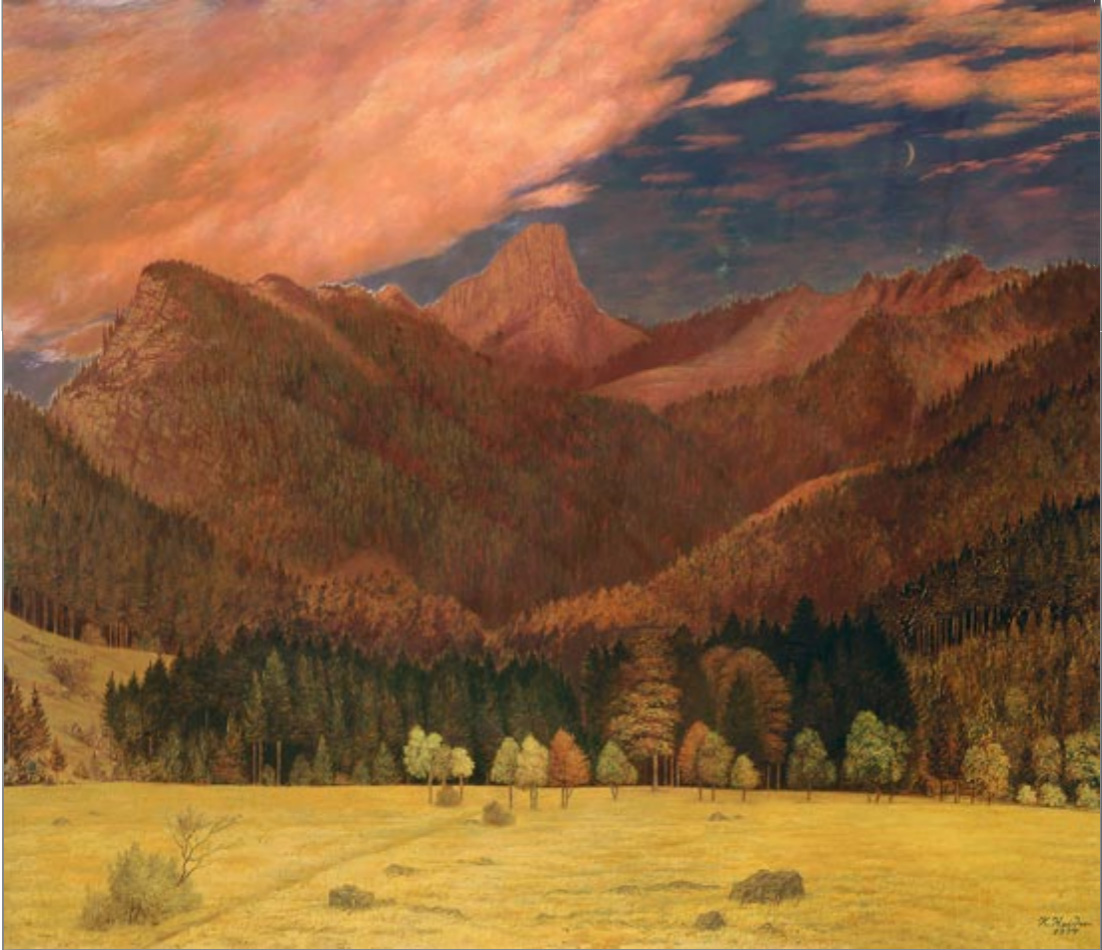
The Ostertal with the Kienberghorn

== Bibliography ==
- Haider, Ernst: Karl Haider. Leben und Werk eines süddeutschen Künstlers. Filser, Augsburg 1926.
- Hartlaub, G. F.; Karl Haider (1846–1912), Gedächtnisausstellung. Städtische Kunsthalle, Mannheim 1924.
- Kutschera, G.; Karl Haider. Universität Dissertation, Innsbruck 1962.
- Kutschera, Gerhild (1966). "Haider, Karl Michael". Neue Deutsche Biographie (in German). Vol. 7. Berlin: Duncker & Humblot. pp. 518–519. (full text online).
- Langewiesche, Karl R.; Vom deutschen Herzen. Werke neuerer deutscher Maler. Langewiesche, Königstein/Taunus 1928. (Die blauen Bücher)
- Partsch, Susanna; "Haider, Karl", in Allgemeines Künstlerlexikon. Die Bildenden Künstler aller Zeiten und Völker (AKL). Vol. 68, p. 11, de Gruyter, Berlin 2010 ISBN 359822818X
- Petzet, Michael; Wilhelm Leibl und sein Kreis. Prestel, Munich 1974, ISBN 3-7913-0087-3.
