= Schlierseer Bauerntheater =

Schlierseer Bauerntheater is a theatre in Schliersee, Bavaria, Germany. It was founded in 1972.

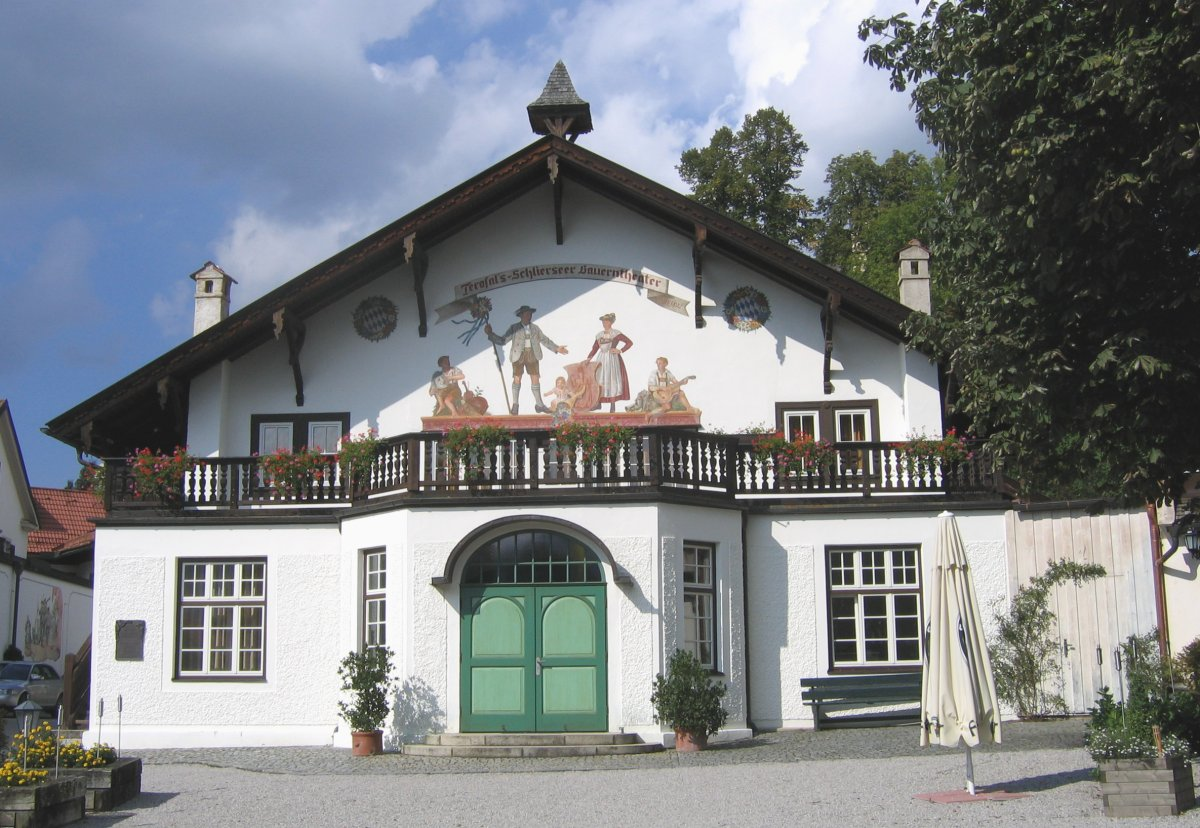
Schlierseer Bauerntheater
