= Till Schmerbeck =

German film producer (born 1969)

- Born: 1969; Munich, West Germany
- Occupation: Film producer
- Years active: 2001 - present

Till Schmerbeck (born 1969 in München) is a German film producer.

== Biography ==
He studied Film production at the Film Academy Baden-Württemberg from 2000 to 2004. The feature film The Longing, which Till Schmerbeck produced, was the first German movie, which could win the grand prize after a couple of years at a famous film festival. The film won the Golden Leopard award at the Locarno International Film Festival.

Till Schmerbeck has his own production company, the Till Schmerbeck Filmproduktion in Berlin.

He lives in Berlin.

== Filmography (selection) ==
- 2002: The Longing (Das Verlangen), (producer)
- 2004: Helden in Gummistiefeln (producer)
- 2005: Der Mann mit dem weissen Bart (short film), (producer)
- 2006: Der Generalmanager oder How To Sell A Tit Wonder (documentary film, directed by Steffen Jürgens), (producer)
- 2007: Blind Fligh (Blindflug), (Co-Producer)
- 2008: Thank You Mr. President (line producer)
- 2009: Résiste - Aufstand der Praktikanten (producer)

== Awards and nominations ==
- 2002: Winner of the Golden Leopard at the Locarno International Film Festival for The Longing
