= Robert Merwald =

German baritone (born 1971)

Robert Merwald (born 1971 in Munich) is a German baritone active in opera, oratorio, and lied, primarily in Germany and Austria.

== Biography ==
He began singing as a boy soprano with the Regensburger Domspatzen. From 1994 he studied singing at the Hochschule für Musik und Theater München in Munich and attended masterclasses with Kurt Moll and Irwin Gage. While a member of the Prinzregententheater opera school and the Akademietheater he performed in works by Mozart, Nicolai and Henze. In 1998 he received a grant from the Deutscher Bühnenverein, and the following year won the Meistersänger-Wettbewerb singing competition in Nürnberg.

His operatic roles at the Tiroler Landestheater in Innsbruck have included the Father in Hänsel und Gretel, Daniello in Krenek's Jonny spielt auf, Silvano in Un ballo in maschera, Papageno in The Magic Flute and Albert in Werther. (He also sang Albert with Nationaltheater Mannheim.) Amongst the opera roles he has sung at the Staatstheater am Gärtnerplatz are Schaunard in La bohème, Graf Dubarry in Die Dubarry, Maximilian in Candide, and Wilhelm Reischmann in Henze's Elegie für junge Liebende

He has sung as a soloist with the Schwäbischer Oratorienchor (Swabian Oratorio Choir) in the Dettingen Te Deum, Israel in Egypt, and Alexander's Feast by Handel as well as in Haydn's The Creation and Bach's Mass in B Minor.

In musical theatre, he appeared in the title role of Ludwig II at the Festspielhaus in Füssen, as José in Man of La Mancha at the Staatstheater am Gärtnerplatz and as Sorel in The Consul at the Orangerie, Neustrelitz.

== Recordings ==
Robert Merwald appears as a soloist with the Vocalensemble Ingolstadt on:

- Mozart: Missa solemnis / Mayr: Te Deum in D major – Georgian Chamber Orchestra, Franz Hauk (conductor). Naxos Records.
- Mayr: Che originali! – Georgian Chamber Orchestra, Franz Hauk (conductor). Guild Records.
- Mayr: La Passione and Stabat Mater No 5 – Georgian Chamber Orchestra, Franz Hauk (conductor). Guild Records.
