= Heinrich Spiess =

German painter

Heinrich Spiess (born in Munich, May 10, 1832; died there, August 8, 1875) was a German painter.

== Biography ==
He was the son of an engraver, completed his studies under Kaulbach, whom he assisted in his cartoon of “The Crusaders,” and executed a celebrated copy of his “Angel carrying a Dead Child to Heaven.” In 1855 he was employed by Kaulbach in decorating the Wartburg. In 1856 he obtained a prize for his “Jacob Wrestling with the Angel,” and in 1861-62 he painted for the museum of Munich the great frescoes relating to the pilgrimage of Duke Henry the Lion to Jerusalem, and to his quelling the disturbances at St. Peter's at the coronation of the emperor Frederick I.
