= Angie Westhoff =

German writer of children's literature (born 1965)

Angie Westhoff (born 1965 in Munich) is a German writer of children's literature.

== Biography ==
Following school, Angie Westhoff studied German Philology and History at LMU Munich and worked as coach and lecturer in international teacher-training. Since 2006, she is writing children's and juvenile literature. In 2013 Angie Westhoff was selected to be one of four new members of the South German literary circle "Die Turmschreiber".

== Publications ==
- Ein Fall für Penelope Klopp Verlag, Hamburg 2007
- Ein neuer Fall für Penelope Klopp Verlag, Hamburg 2007
- Die Klapperschlangen (Band 1-6) Klopp Verlag, Hamburg 2008-2011
- Das Buch der seltsamen Wünsche Klopp Verlag, Hamburg 2010
- Die Nachtflüsterin Klopp Verlag, Hamburg 2011
- Heldengeburtstage Pink, Hamburg 2012
- Die Klapperschlangen (Band 1-6) Oetinger Taschenbuch Verlag, Hamburg 2012/13
- Das Buch der seltsamen Wünsche Oetinger Taschenbuch Verlag, Hamburg 2013
- Rockprinzessin Pink, Hamburg 2013
- Das Dschungelbuch Ellermann Verlag, Hamburg 2013
- Alles wegen Amélie - Paris Oetinger Taschenbuch Verlag, Hamburg 2013
- Amélie v Paříži CooBoo Verlag, Prag 2014
- Der kleine Lord Ellermann Verlag, Hamburg 2014
- Der geheime Club Pink, Hamburg 2015
- Robin Hood Ellermann Verlag, Hamburg 2016
- Robin Hood (Hörbuch) Igel Records, Dortmund 2016
- Bellas zauberhafte Glücksmomente Random House, München 2016
- Das Buch der seltsamen Wünsche. Der 13. Wunsch; Band 2 Oetinger Taschenbuch GmbH, Hamburg 2017

== Awards ==
In 2011, her book Das Buch der seltsamen Wünsche was included in the recommendations by the International Youth-Library (The White Ravens).
