= Richard Hallgarten =

German illustrator and painter (1905–1932)

- Richard Hallgarten
- Born: Richard Victor Charles Anton Hallgarten; 14 January 1905; Munich, Kingdom of Bavaria, German Empire
- Died: 5 May 1932 (aged 27); Holzhausen am Ammersee, Bavaria, Germany
- Other name: Ricki Hallgarten
- Occupations: Painter, graphic artist, illustrator, writer
- Known for: Illustrations for Stoffel fliegt übers Meer; collaboration with Erika Mann
- Parents: Robert Hallgarten (father); Constanze Hallgarten (mother)
- Relatives: George W. F. Hallgarten (brother); Charles Hallgarten (grandfather)

Richard Victor Charles Anton Hallgarten (14 January 1905 – 5 May 1932), generally known as Ricki Hallgarten, was a German painter, graphic artist, book illustrator and author of children's literature. A close childhood friend of Erika Mann and Klaus Mann, he collaborated with Erika on the children's play Jan's Wunderhündchen and illustrated her first children's book, Stoffel fliegt übers Meer (1932).

== Early life and family ==
Hallgarten was born in Munich on 14 January 1905. His father, Robert Hallgarten (1870–1924), was an independently wealthy scholar with doctorates in law and German studies, while his mother, Constanze Hallgarten (1881–1969), was a campaigner for women's rights and the peace movement. His paternal grandfather was the banker and philanthropist Charles Hallgarten. His older brother, George W. F. Hallgarten (1901–1975), later became a historian and political scientist. The family was part of Munich's educated bourgeoisie and had assimilated Jewish ancestry.

The Hallgartens lived at Pienzenauerstraße 15 in Munich's Herzogpark neighbourhood, close to the home of the novelist Thomas Mann and his family. The proximity of these families brought Hallgarten into contact with Thomas Mann's children Erika and Klaus, with whom he developed lasting friendships. The Hallgarten family home became a meeting place within Munich's literary and artistic circles.

In 1919, Hallgarten, Erika and Klaus Mann, and Gretel and Lotte Walter, daughters of the conductor Bruno Walter, established an amateur theatre group called the Laienbund Deutscher Mimiker (Amateur Association of German Mimes). The young performers staged plays in their families' homes and gardens. Members of the group also attended the private Ebermayer Institute run by Ernestine and Ottilie Ebermayer in Munich. Hallgarten's friendship with the Mann siblings was subsequently described by Klaus Mann in his autobiographical works Kind dieser Zeit (Child of This Time) and Der Wendepunkt (The Turning Point).

== Artistic career and travels ==
Hallgarten moved to Berlin in October 1924 in the hope of establishing himself as an artist. His father died the following month. At Christmas 1926, he left for Mexico and subsequently travelled to the United States, where he attempted to pursue an artistic career. In New York City, he supported himself through casual employment, including washing dishes and delivering flowers. Erika and Klaus Mann visited him during their travels in 1927. He returned to Europe in 1929.

From around 1930, Hallgarten spent time in Holzhausen am Ammersee, near Utting am Ammersee, where he rented a cottage in the grounds of the Gasteiger property on Ammersee. He used the setting as a place to paint, draw and write, although he continued to travel to Munich. Erika Mann, concerned about his recurring periods of depression, sought opportunities for him to work on creative projects. She arranged for him to attempt illustrations for Thomas Mann's novella Mario and the Magician, but he abandoned the drawings; the illustrations for the published work were instead undertaken by Hans Meid.

In 1931, Hallgarten and Erika Mann entered a 10,000-kilometre (approximately 6,200-mile) motor rally across Europe, organised with the involvement of Ford and the Automobilclub von Deutschland. The pair won the event, which attracted considerable attention in the German press.

== Literary and artistic work ==
Hallgarten and Erika Mann jointly wrote Jan's Wunderhündchen: Ein Kinderstück in sieben Bildern (Jan's Wonder Puppy: A Children's Play in Seven Scenes) in 1931. The Christmas fairy-tale play was first performed at the Landestheater Darmstadt on 14 December 1932, several months after Hallgarten's death. A contemporary Darmstadt newspaper announced the scheduled performance, identifying both Mann and Hallgarten as the authors.

Hallgarten also prepared an illustrated manuscript entitled 11 Mörder-Bilderbuch (approximately Eleven Murderer Picture Book), possibly intended for Kadidja Wedekind, but it did not reach commercial publication. The surviving original is identified in the Kadidja Wedekind collection at Munich's Monacensia literary archive.

His best-known published illustrations appeared in Erika Mann's children's book Stoffel fliegt übers Meer (Stoffel Flies Across the Sea), issued by Levy & Müller in Stuttgart in 1932. Hallgarten designed the cover and interior pictures. The story concerns a young boy who travels to America aboard an airship to seek help for his family. Hallgarten produced the illustrations in Holzhausen, on the Gasteiger estate. The book appeared after his death and was later reissued with his original artwork.

Some of Hallgarten's prints and drawings are preserved in the Monacensia collection of the Munich City Library. These include undated prints depicting people and horses, prints of couples, and a charcoal drawing from 1927 titled Wartende Familie (Waiting Family). The works are recorded under the collection identifier KM F 283.

== Personal life ==
Hallgarten maintained close personal relationships with members of the Mann family, particularly Erika and Klaus Mann, whom he had known since childhood. The siblings regarded him almost as a brother, and their friendship continued throughout his adult life. Erika Mann was particularly concerned about his emotional well-being and encouraged him to participate in literary, artistic and theatrical projects. Klaus Mann subsequently described their friendship in his autobiographical writings and commemorated Hallgarten in the 1932 essay Ricki Hallgarten: Radikalismus des Herzens (Ricki Hallgarten: Radicalism of the Heart).

=== Sexuality and romantic relationships ===
Hallgarten's personal relationships included both men and women. The German literary biographer Manfred Flügge, in his study Das Jahrhundert der Manns (2015), describes Hallgarten as having successive relationships with partners of both sexes. Although Hallgarten's own understanding of his sexual orientation has not been established, these accounts suggest that he may be characterised retrospectively as bisexual.

His relationship with Klaus Mann, the openly homosexual son of Thomas Mann, has also been described as extending beyond friendship. In The Rest Is Noise: Listening to the Twentieth Century (2007), the American music critic and author Alex Ross identifies Hallgarten as both a friend and an occasional lover of Klaus Mann. The two had been close since childhood and remained members of the same artistic and literary circle throughout Hallgarten's life.

Hallgarten also served as a model for the fictional character Richard Darmstädter in Klaus Mann's novel Treffpunkt im Unendlichen (1932). Darmstädter is portrayed as a psychologically troubled young man who experiences an unhappy homosexual attachment to a young man named Tom and eventually dies by suicide. Flügge discusses the parallels between the fictional character and Hallgarten, while distinguishing literary representation from historical biography. Hallgarten's brother, Wolfgang, later criticised Klaus Mann for the portrayal, believing that the novel had adversely affected his brother.

Among Hallgarten's documented relationships with women, the most significant was with the German-American artist Eva Herrmann (1901–1978), whom he met in New York in 1927. Their romantic involvement lasted until approximately 1930–1931. According to Flügge's biography of Herrmann, she regarded Hallgarten as one of the great loves of her life and remained deeply affected by his death in 1932. Hallgarten reportedly considered marrying her.

He was also romantically attached to the actress Maria Byk, whose real name was Albertine Gellner, and had earlier experienced unrequited love for Lucie Schuler. Both relationships are discussed in Kristina Kargl's examination of Hallgarten's personal history and estate. Despite difficulties in his relationship with Byk, Hallgarten named her as a beneficiary of his will.

=== Health and personal difficulties ===
Hallgarten experienced recurring psychological distress and health problems from an early age. According to family recollections examined by Kargl, he experienced episodes of disorientation during childhood and subsequently underwent medical treatment. Later accounts describe neurological symptoms, including seizures, alongside periods of emotional instability and depression. These descriptions reflect historical testimony rather than independently verifiable modern medical diagnoses.

His psychological difficulties became a source of considerable concern among his friends. Erika Mann attempted to support him through their creative collaborations and shared travels. Eva Herrmann was also aware of his health problems and, following his death, wrote that she had been uncertain how much of his suffering was psychological and how much was physical.

== Death and remembrance ==
Hallgarten died by suicide on 5 May 1932, aged 27, in his rented cottage in the park of Villa Gasteiger at Holzhausen on Ammersee. He had been due to depart the following day on a journey through Asia Minor, Persia and Russia with Erika Mann, Klaus Mann and the writer Annemarie Schwarzenbach. His death led to the cancellation of the planned journey.

Klaus Mann commemorated his friend in the essay Ricki Hallgarten: Radikalismus des Herzens (Ricki Hallgarten: Radicalism of the Heart), written in 1932. He also dedicated his autobiographical book Kind dieser Zeit to Hallgarten. Their friendship features in Mann's later autobiography Der Wendepunkt, and Hallgarten's collaboration with Erika Mann has been discussed in subsequent studies of children's literature and the Mann family.

== Personal correspondence and estate ==
Hallgarten's personal correspondence, including letters and drawings addressed to Erika Mann, is preserved among the Erika Mann papers at the Monacensia literary archive in Munich. These materials provide evidence of the close relationships within his artistic and literary circle.

Hallgarten left a handwritten will dated 24 November 1931, supplemented on 16 March 1932. His estate was valued at approximately 55,000 Reichsmarks. He bequeathed half of his estate to his mother, Constanze Hallgarten, while the remainder was divided among several close associates, including Erika and Klaus Mann, the family confidante Luise Essert, Maria Byk and Doris von Schoenthan.

The will also contained personal instructions concerning his possessions and pets. He asked Elisabeth Mann to care for his dog Wolfram and Irene Gasteiger to take his cat Bastian. He requested cremation without a funeral ceremony and expressly stipulated that his name should not be inscribed on the family gravestone at Munich's Waldfriedhof cemetery. These provisions were documented in probate records subsequently examined by Kargl.

== Selected works ==
- Mann, Erika; Hallgarten, Richard (1931). Jan's Wunderhündchen: Ein Kinderstück in sieben Bildern. Children's play, first performed in Darmstadt in 1932; reissued by Anja Gärtig, Munich, in 2005, with an afterword by Dirk Heißerer. ISBN 978-3-936609-20-2.
- Hallgarten, Richard. 11 Mörder-Bilderbuch. Unpublished illustrated manuscript; held in the Monacensia's Kadidja Wedekind collection.
- Mann, Erika (1932). Stoffel fliegt übers Meer. Stuttgart: Levy & Müller. Cover and illustrations by Richard Hallgarten; reissued by Rowohlt, Reinbek, in 2005, with an afterword by Dirk Heißerer. ISBN 3-499-21331-1.
