= Aiplspitz =

Mountain in Germany

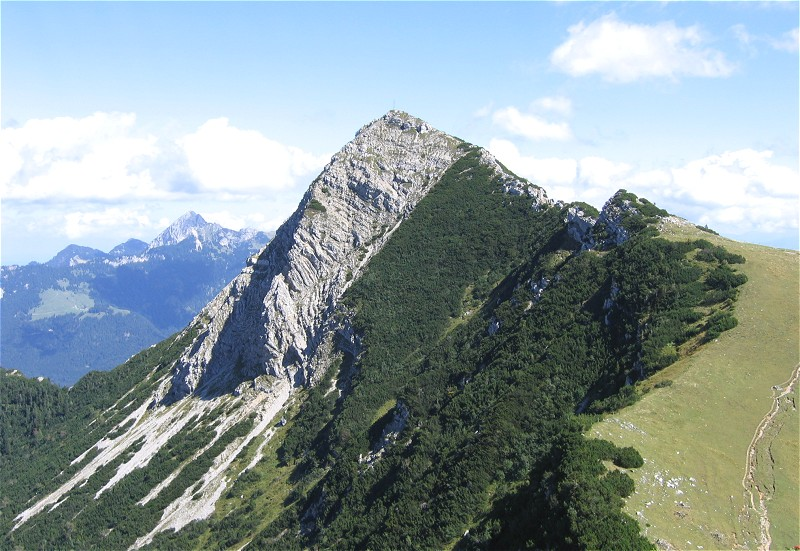

Highest point
- Elevation: 1,759 m (5,771 ft)
- Coordinates: 47°40′25″N 11°55′28″E

Geography
- Location within Bavaria
- Location: Bavaria, Germany

The Aiplspitz is a 1,759 meter high mountain in the Rotwand group east of the Spitzingsee in the Bavarian Prealps, Germany.
