= Ernst Haider =

German painter

Ernst Haider (* 16 November 1890 in Munich; † 27 January 1988 in Starnberg) was a German painter and graphic artist.

== Life ==
Ernst Haider was the son of Bavarian landscape artist and art professor Karl Michael Haider and his second wife Ernestine Schwarz. He enrolled at the Academy of Fine Arts Munich and studied drawing in Angelo Jank's class together with Walther Kerschensteiner. 1947 he was elected for the board of the Kunstverein München. His oevre has been on display in various locations amongst others in the elementary school Gräfelfing in a group display of the literary association Gräfelfin in April 1953. Until his death he lived in the artists' colony in Stockdorf. After his death his paintings had been displayed in a retrospective in Gauting.

== Selected works ==
- 1924: Verschneites Hochtal
- 1926: Oberbayerische Landschaften. Mappe mit 6 Radierungen. München: Selbstverlag Ernst Haider
- 1927: Blick auf St. Moritzer See
- 1935: Sommerliche Weidelandschaft
- 1942: Blick auf Bettwar im Taubertal
- 1954: Akt bei der Morgentoilette
- 1961: Weiblicher Akt mit Kopftuch

== Literature ==
- Ernst Haider: Karl Haider (1846–1912), Gedächtnis-Ausstellung, Glaspalast, 17. Mai bis 21. Juni 1925 / Münchener Neue Sezession. München: Wolf & Sohn, 1925.
- Ernst Haider: Karl Haider. Leben und Werk eines Süddeutschen Malers. Augsburg: Filser, 1926.
- Ernst Haider: Zu meinen Bildern, 1937.
