= Friedrich Brugger =

German sculptor

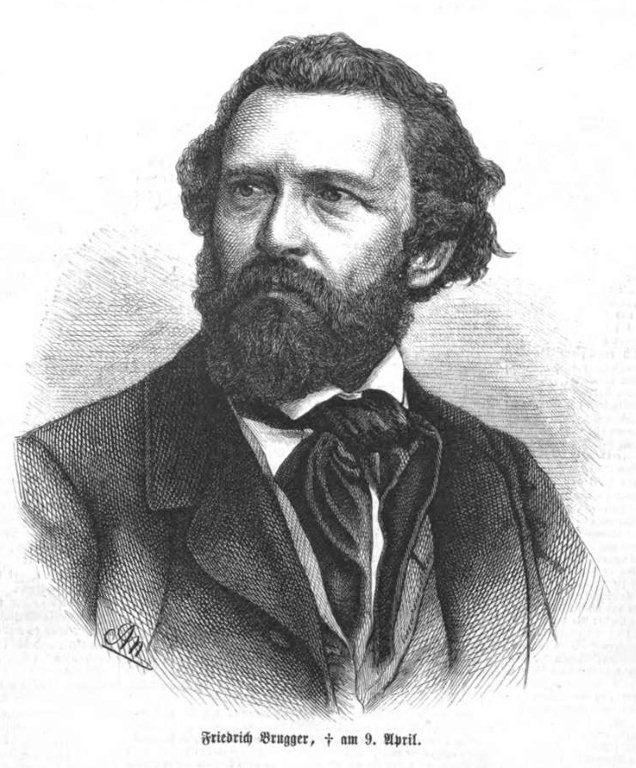
- Friedrich Brugger by Adolf Neumann
- Born: 13 January 1815; Munich
- Died: 8 April 1870 (aged 55); Munich
- Occupation: sculptor

Friedrich Brugger (13 January 1815 – 8 April 1870), was a German sculptor.

Brugger was born 13 January 1815 at Munich. He studied at the Munich Academy of Fine Arts, after which he stayed in Italy from 1841 to 1843. He returned to Munich where he received commissions from Ludwig I of Bavaria, including busts in the Ruhmeshalle and large bronze statues. Together with Johann Martin von Wagner and Johann von Halbig, he created the Quadriga on the Siegestor (Victory Gate) arch in Munich. He designed and modelled the sculptured form for the monument to Maximilian II, cast in 1860 by Ferdinand von Miller, for the central square of the Altes Schloss (Old Palace) on Maximilianstraße in Bayreuth.

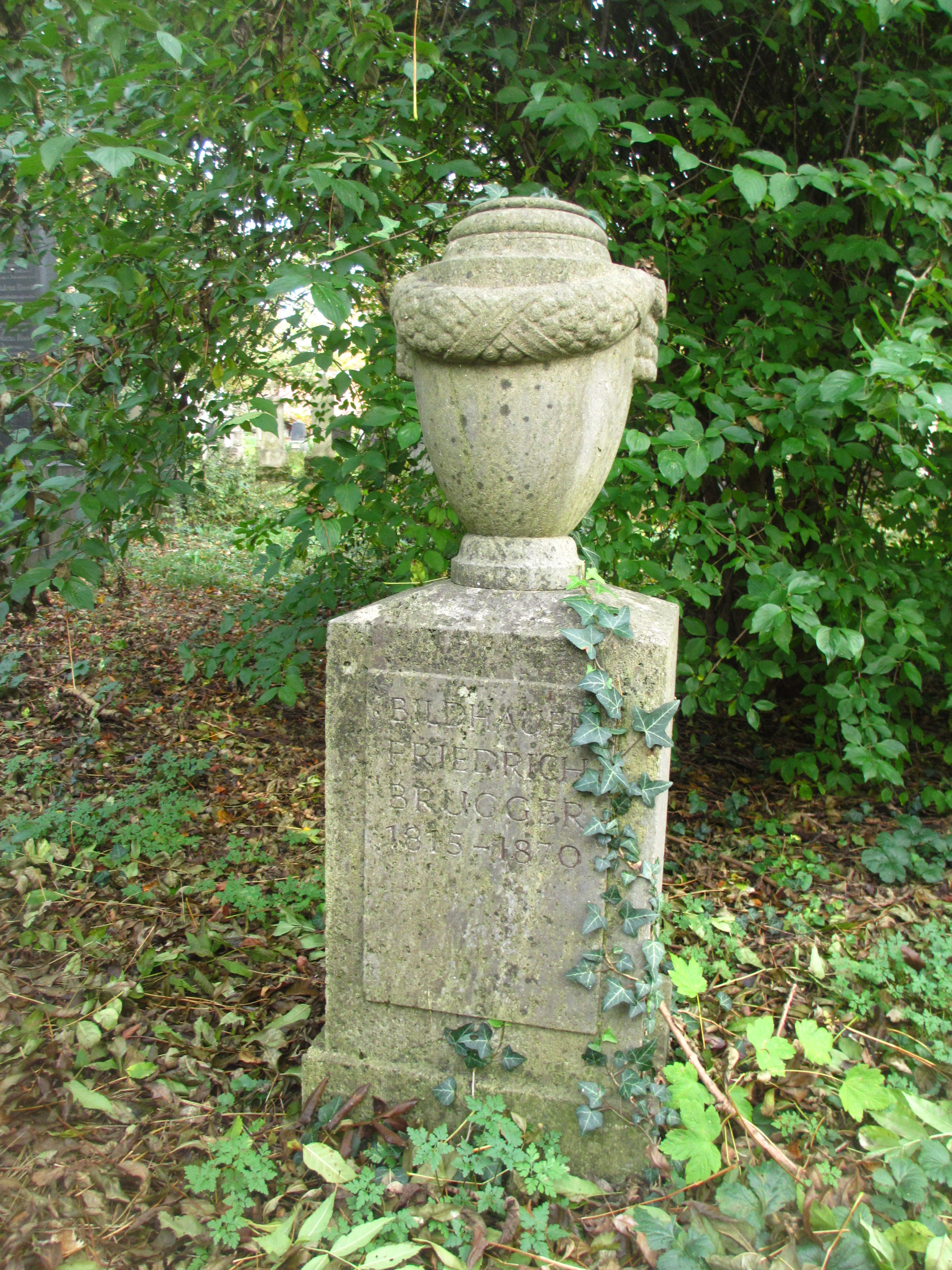
Friedrich Brugger's grave at the Old South Cemetery, Munich

Brugger died 8 April 1870, and is buried in the Alter Südfriedhof (Old South Cemetery) in Munich (Area 16, Row 10, Plot 26; at ).

== Selected works ==
- 1848: Monument to Christoph Willibald Gluck at the Promenadeplatz in Munich
- 1852: Tomb of Johannes von Müller at the Altstädter Friedhof in Kassel (with Leo von Klenze; dismantled 1936, reconstructed 2009)
- 1857: Monument to Jakob Fugger on Philippine-Welser-Strasse in Augsburg
- 1857: Guard portrait by Hermann von Vicari in the Augustiner Museum at Freiburg im Breisgau
- 1858: Monument to Duke Louis the Rich, in Landshut
- 1860: Monument to Carl Philipp von Wrede in Heidelberg (dismantled and melted down, 17 April 1940)
- 1861: Monument to Friedrich Wilhelm Joseph Schelling on the Maximilianstraße, Munich
- 1861: Monument to the Elector Maximilian II at the Promenadeplatz, Munich
- 1867: Monument to Leo von Klenze at the Gärtnerplatz, Munich
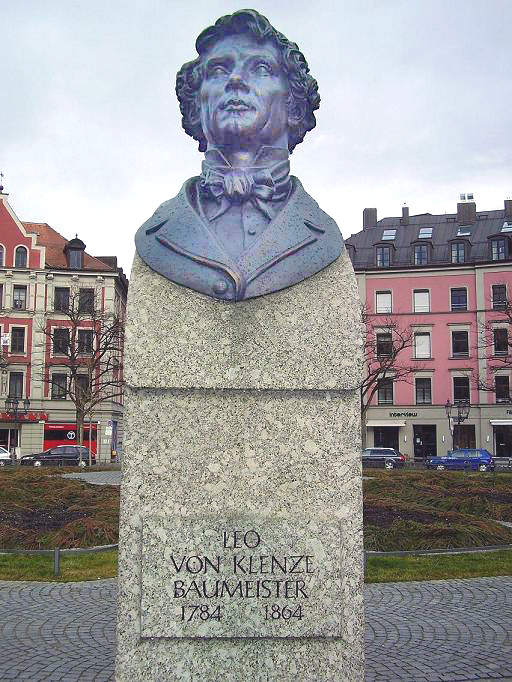
Monument to Leo von Klenze, Munich

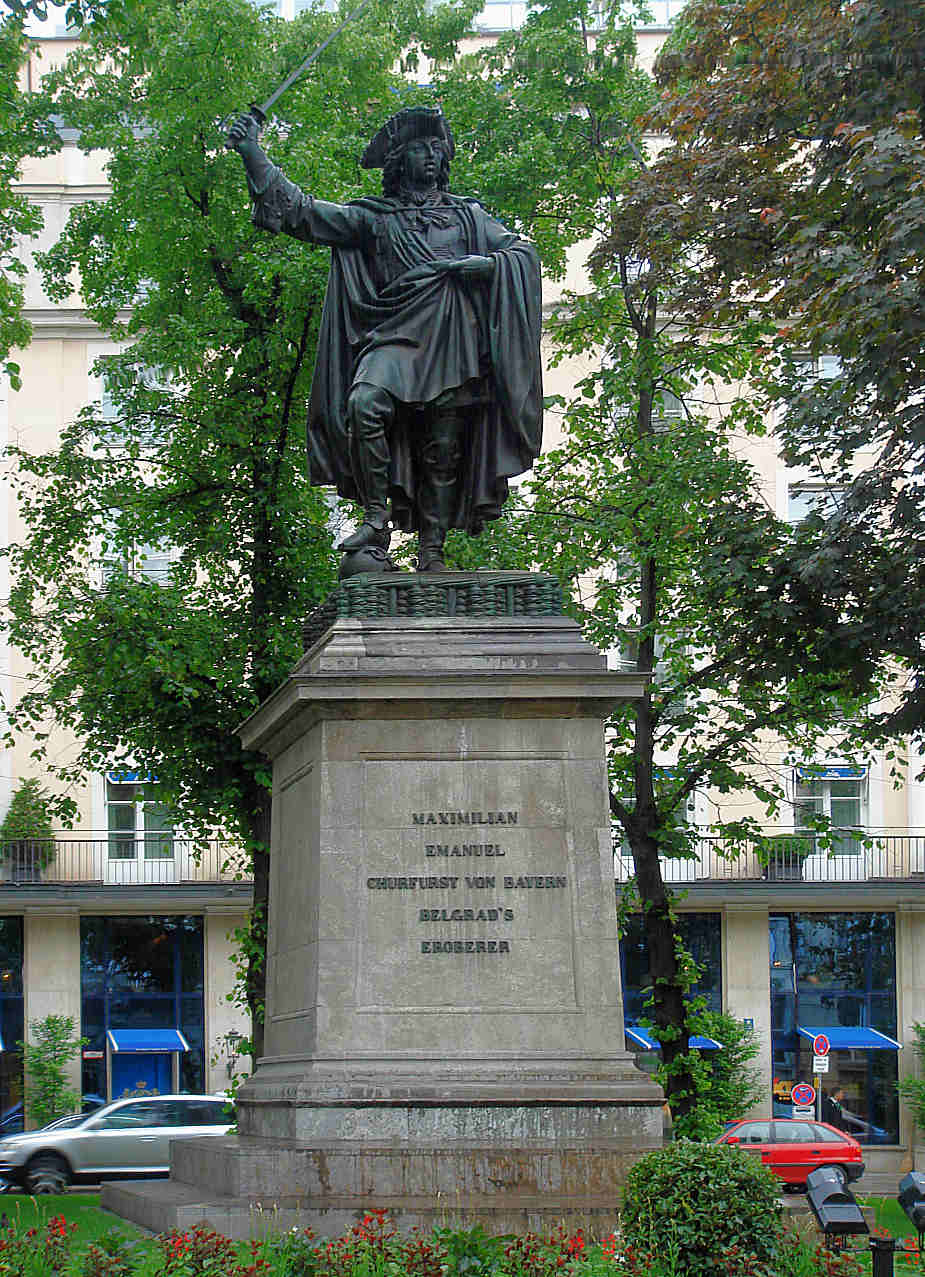
Monument to Max II Emanuel, Munich

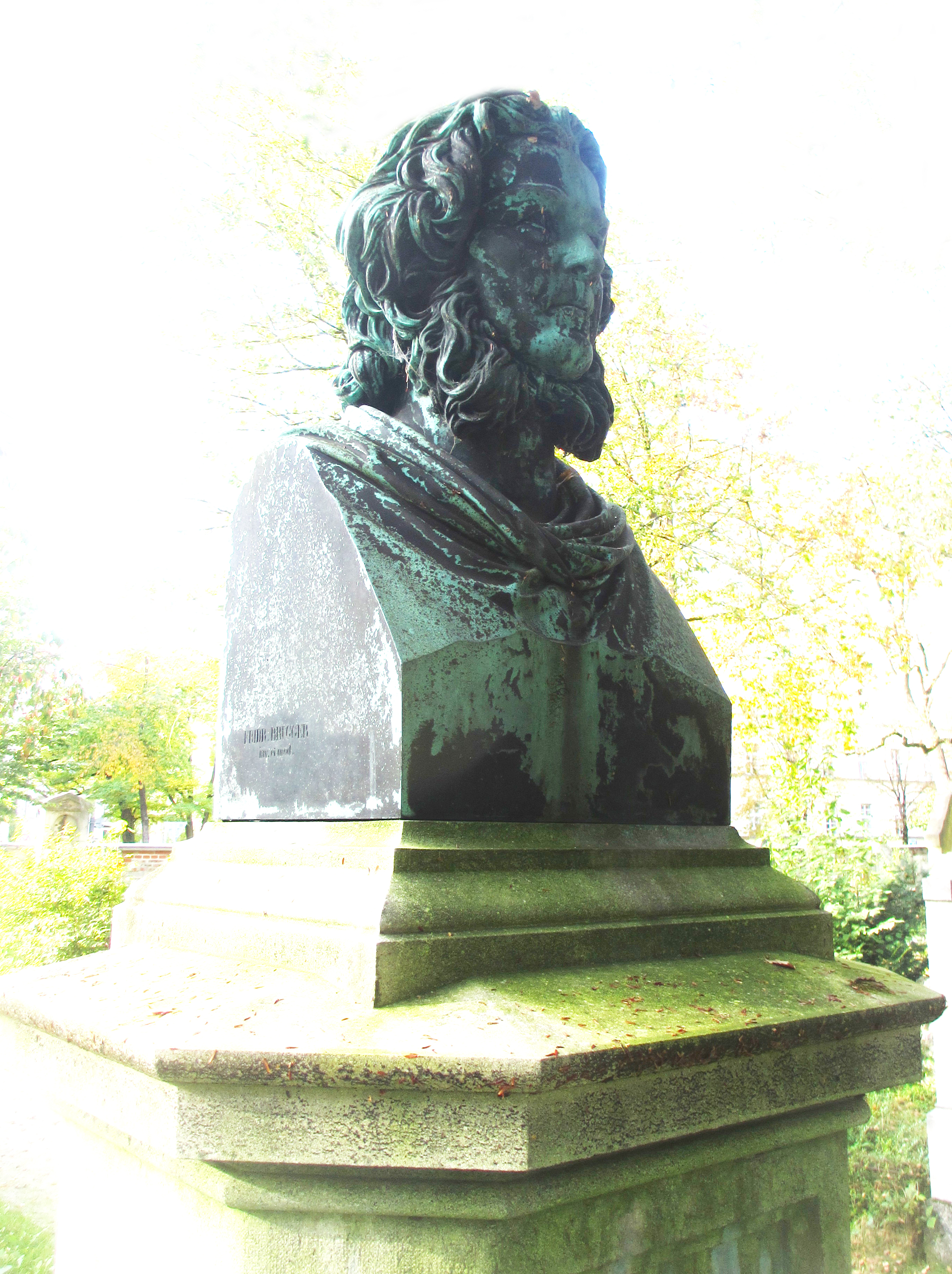
Grave monument bust of Ernst von Lasaulx

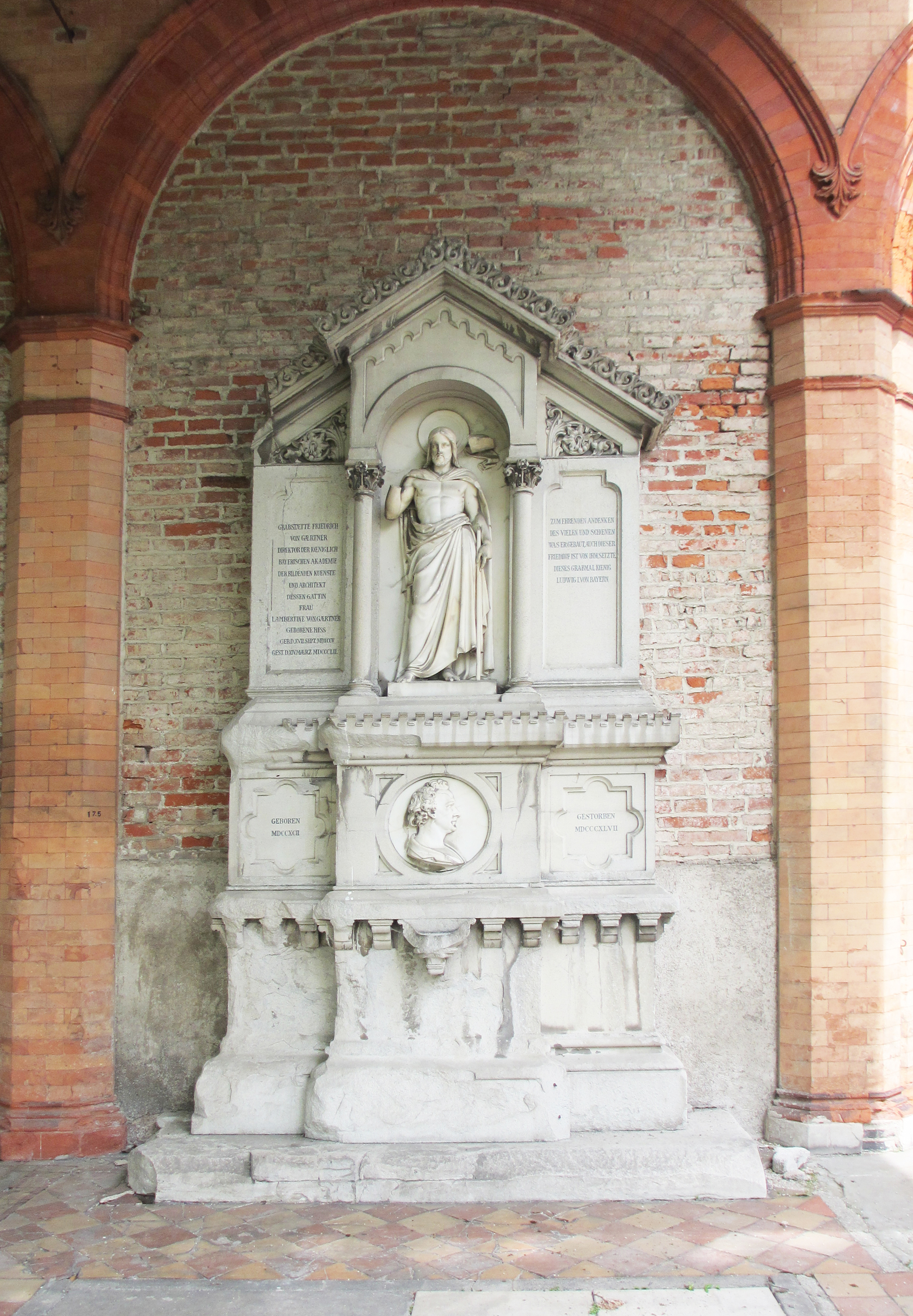
Grave monument to Leo von Klenze

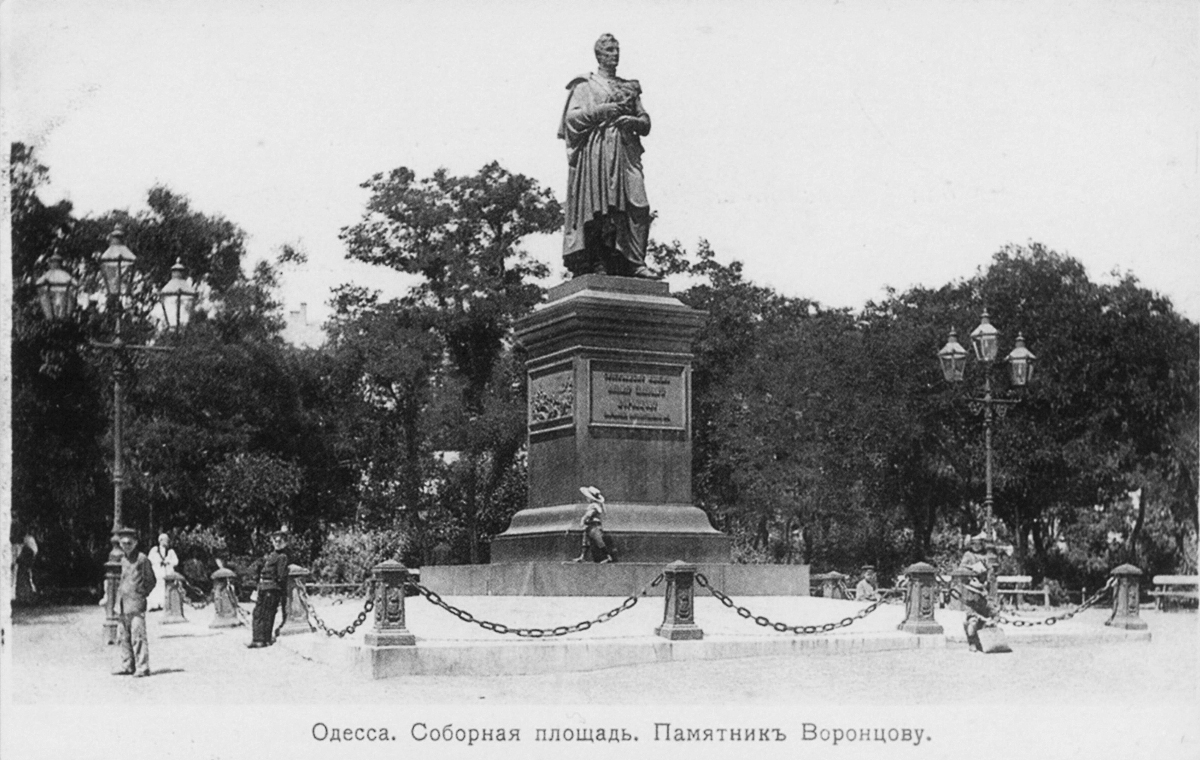
Monument to Mikhail Semyonovich Vorontsov, Odessa

== Bibliography ==
- Pecht, Friedrich; Allgemeine Deutsche Biographie (ADB), "Brugger, Friedrich", Volume 3, Duncker & Humblot, Leipzig 1876, p. 409.
