= Krailling =

- Municipality
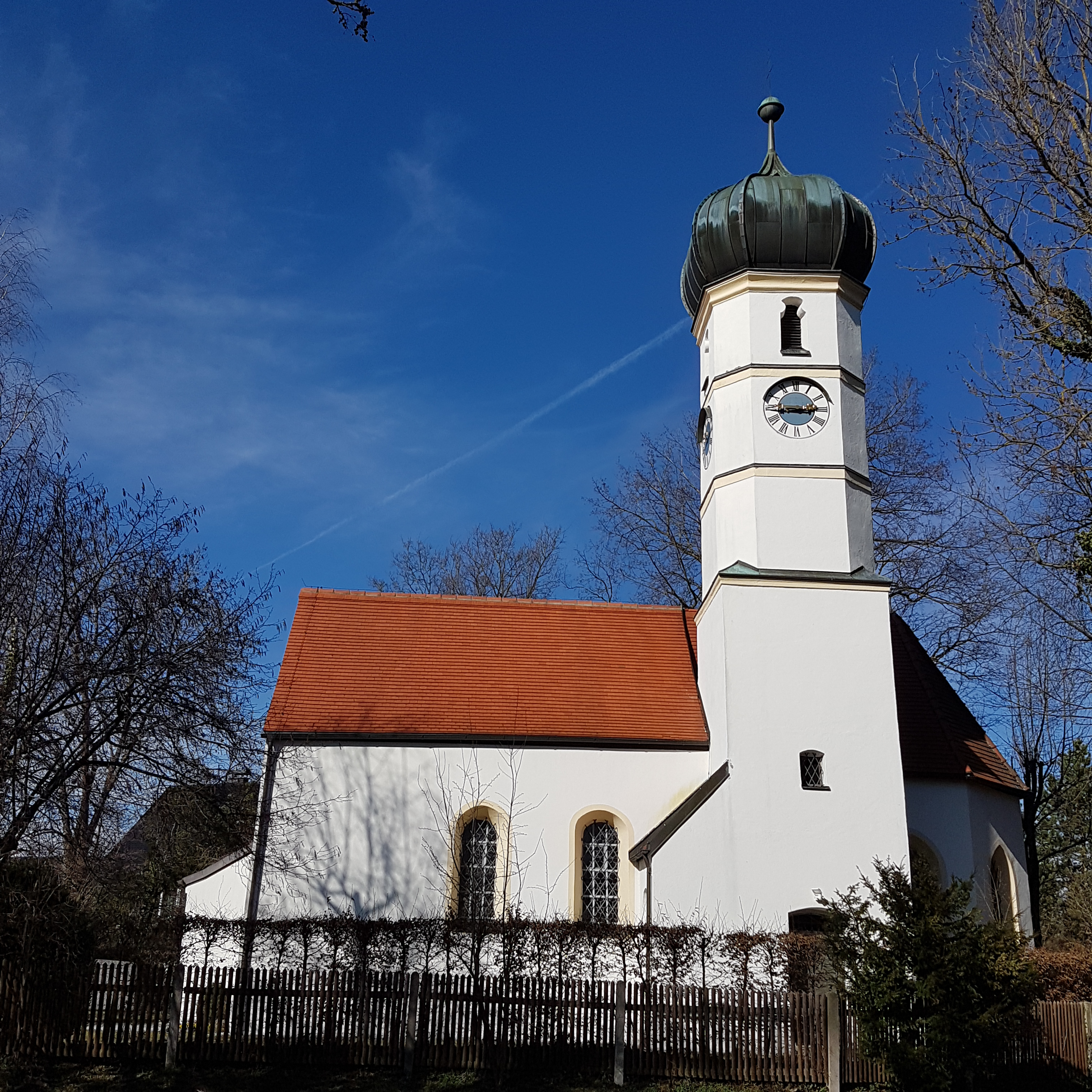
- Church of Saint Margaret

- Coat of arms

- Location of Krailling within Starnberg district
- Interactive map of Krailling
- Location within Germany Location within Bavaria
- Coordinates: 48°05′53″N 11°24′26″E
- Country: Germany
- State: Bavaria
- Admin. region: Oberbayern
- District: Starnberg

Government
  - Mayor (2019–25): Rudolph Haux (FDP)

Area
  - Total: 16 km^{2} (6.2 sq mi)
- Elevation: 548 m (1,798 ft)

Population (2025-12-31)
  - Total: 7,797
  - Density: 490/km^{2} (1,300/sq mi)
- Time zone: UTC+01:00 (CET)
  - Summer (DST): UTC+02:00 (CEST)
- Postal codes: 82152
- Dialling codes: 089
- Vehicle registration: STA
- Website: www.krailling.de

Krailling (German pronunciation: [ˈkʁaɪlɪŋ]) is a municipality in the district of Starnberg in Bavaria, Germany.

== Notable residents ==
- The folk actor Gustl Bayrhammer (1922–1993) died in Krailling and was buried there.
- The sculptor Rudolf Belling (1886–1972) lived and died in Krailling.
- The architect Martin Dülfer (1859–1942) lived in Krailling.
- The baritone Hermann Prey (1929–1998) lived in Krailling, died here and was buried in the Kraillinger cemetery.

== Geography ==
The municipality is located in the Munich planning region. It covers an area of 16.0 km^{2} (6.2 sq mi). The town lies in the Würm Valley, approximately 14 kilometers north of the district capital Starnberg and four kilometers southwest of the city limits of Munich.

The settlement area has merged with that of the municipality of Planegg. It also belongs to the Planegg parish and shares the same postal code. However, unlike Planegg, Krailling is part of the Starnberg district rather than the Munich district. Krailling is the northernmost town in the Starnberg district but is assigned the Munich area code (089). To the south, the settlement area transitions seamlessly into Stockdorf, a district of Gauting.

The municipality comprises four administrative subdivisions (with settlement types in parentheses):

- Hüll (manor estate)
- Frohnloh (church village)
- Krailling (church village)
- Pentenried (church village)

The "KIM" (Krailling Innovation Mile) business park is located in the Kreuzlinger Forst forest area. The municipality also includes the cadastral districts of Frohnloh and Krailling.

== History ==
=== Until the Municipality's Formation ===
The oldest traces of settlement documented here date from 150 to 100 BC. Several pieces of Celtic jewelry, pottery shards, and house posts were discovered on the grounds of the Linnermühle. This makes Krailling, alongside Buchendorf and Steinebach am Wörthsee, one of the few Celtic settlements south of Munich.

From 200 to 300 AD, a pottery kiln and a refuse pit were also found at the site, though no Roman settlement traces were identified. Numerous artifacts, however, confirm a Bavarian (Bajuvarian) settlement along the Würm River from 600 to 900 AD.

Until the late 18th century, Krailling was the seat of a Hofmark (manorial estate) ruled by the Barons of Ruffin. This Hofmark was part of the Electorate of Bavaria. The modern municipality was established in 1818 through the Municipal Edict of 1818, as part of administrative reforms in the Kingdom of Bavaria.

=== 20th Century ===
After World War II, many refugees and expellees (German: Heimatvertriebene) settled in the district of Pentenried, which became profoundly shaped by this population group.
