= William Williamson =

William Williamson may refer to:

- William Williamson (American politician) (1875–1972), US Representative
- William Williamson (Australian politician) (1867–1950)
- William Crawford Williamson (1816–1895), English naturalist
- William D. Williamson (1779–1846), American, Governor of Maine, US Representative
- William Price Williamson (1884–1918), American officer in the U.S. Navy
- William Williamson (canoeist) (1915–1991), Canadian canoeist
- William Richard Williamson (1872–1958), English adventurer and oil company representative
- William Williamson (priest, born 1697) (1697–1765), Anglican priest in Ireland, Archdeacon of Kildare
- William Williamson (priest, born 1645) (1645–1722), Irish Anglican priest, Archdeacon of Glendalough
- Willie Williamson (1944–2021), college football coach
- Bill Williamson (1922–1979), Australian jockey
- Bill Williamson (footballer) (1887–1918), English footballer

== See also ==
- Billy Williamson (disambiguation)
- Williamson (surname)
- Williamson (disambiguation)
