= Lüßbach =

River in Bavaria, Germany

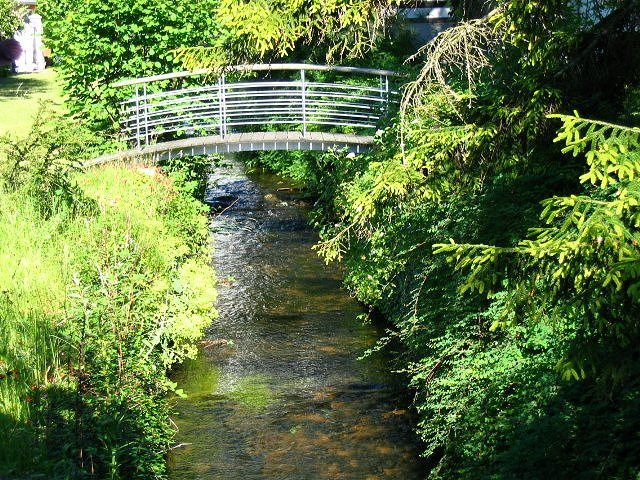
- The Lüßbach in Starnberg

Location
- Country: Germany
- State: Bavaria

Physical characteristics
- Mouth
  - location: Lake Starnberg
  - coordinates: 47.9964°N 11.3571°E
- Length: 21.3 km (13.2 mi)

Basin features
- Progression: Würm→ Amper→ Isar→ Danube→ Black Sea

Lüßbach is a river of Bavaria, Germany. It flows into Lake Starnberg, which is drained by the Würm, near Starnberg.

== See also ==
- List of rivers of Bavaria
