= Maisinger Bach =

River in Germany

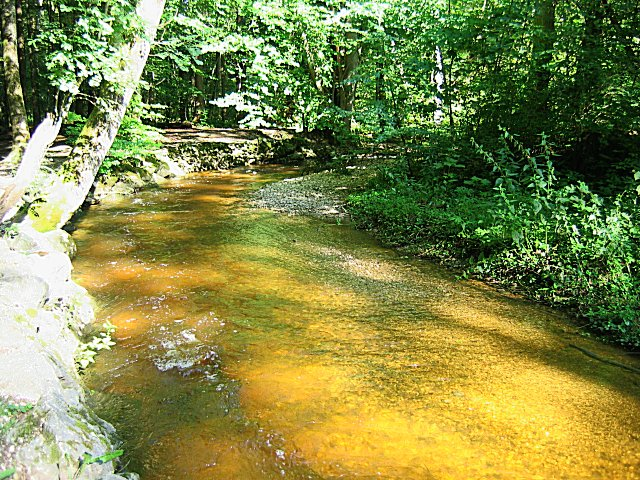
- Gorge of Maisinger Bach

Location
- Country: Germany
- State: Bavaria

Physical characteristics
- Mouth
  - location: Lake Starnberg
  - coordinates: 47.9976°N 11.3501°E
- Length: 42.3 km (26.3 mi)

Basin features
- Progression: Würm→ Amper→ Isar→ Danube→ Black Sea

The Maisinger Bach is a river in Bavaria, Germany. It flows into Lake Starnberg, which is drained by the Würm, in Starnberg. During its course in Starnberg, the Maisinger Bach is called Georgenbach.

Its climate type is temperate oceanic climate, and its length is 42 km.

== See also ==
- List of rivers of Bavaria
