= Schloss Fußberg =

- Gauting, Bavaria, Germany
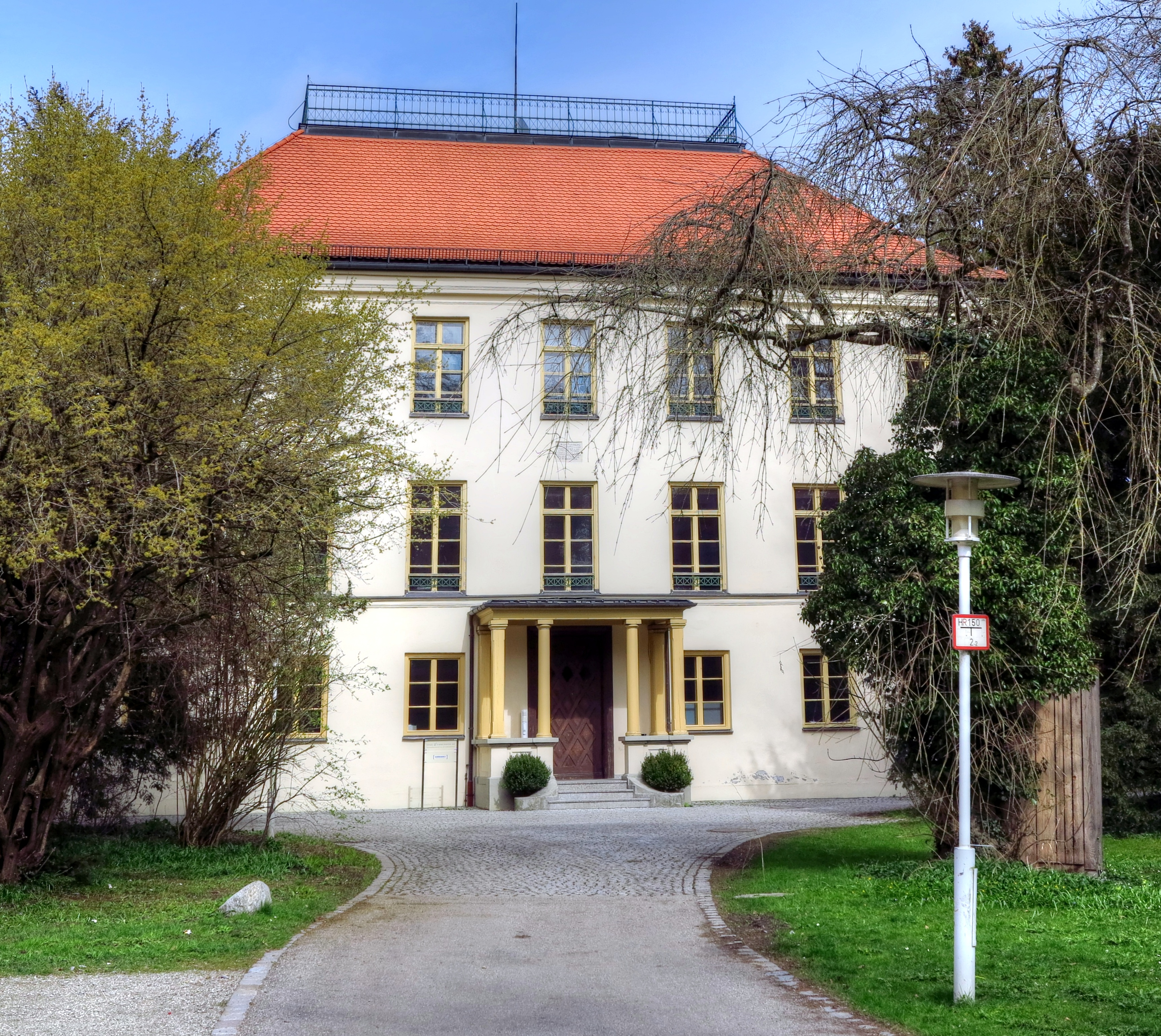
- Facade of the castle

Location
- Location in Bavaria
- Coordinates: 48.0701°N 11.388086°E

Site history
- Built: 1721
- Built by: Paul von Dießen

Schloss Fußberg is a stately house in the village of Gauting, Bavaria, Germany dating from 1721.

== History ==
Schloss Fußberg lies to the north of the historic center of Gauting on the left bank of the Würm. It is named after the 12th century noble family of Fuß, also written as Fuoz, Vuoz or in Latin "pes", followers of the House of Wittelsbach. The original castle was in a loop of the Würm, protected by a moat. The octagonal tower was first documented in 1342. No traces remain. The replacing castle with living quarters and farm buildings was built in the 16th century. It was depicted in 1701 in Michael Wening's Historico-Topographica descriptio Bavariae.

The present building was erected in 1721 on the medieval foundations. It is a baroque building that served as a summer residence for the Andechs Abbey and a resting place on the route to Munich. After the monasteries were secularized, in 1819 the castle was acquired by Karl Theodor Maria, Freiherr von Hallberg-Broich die Anlage. He was an eccentric who had traveled widely. He dressed casually and became known as the "hermit of Gauting". He undertook a project to drain the Erdinger Moos. He painted the doors and windows of the castle vermilion, but since then they have been repainted in white. The Belvedere in the park was built in the 19th century.

The castle was purchased by the community in 1981, and the English-style landscaped park is now open to the public. Most of the building is leased to a private company. The former coach house, which is called "Remise" is a building with a huge hipped roof and curved Art Nouveau dormer windows, is available for art and cultural events. It is used for theater, concerts, lectures, exhibitions and festivals. It can accommodate up to 175 visitors.

In 2017 the "Salettl" reopened, after it was renovated, as an Italian restaurant.

== Gallery ==
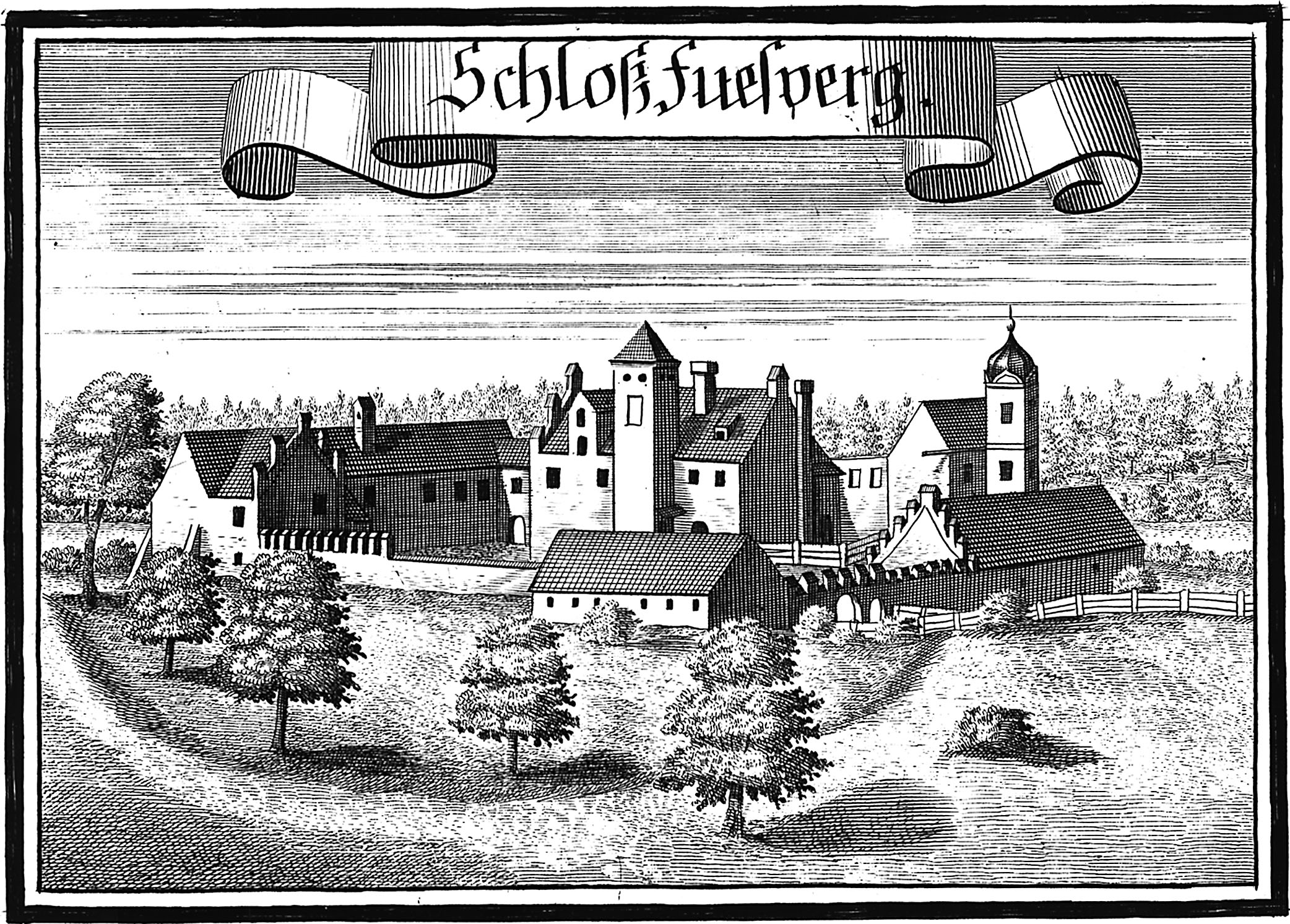
Engraving c. 1700 by Michael Wening

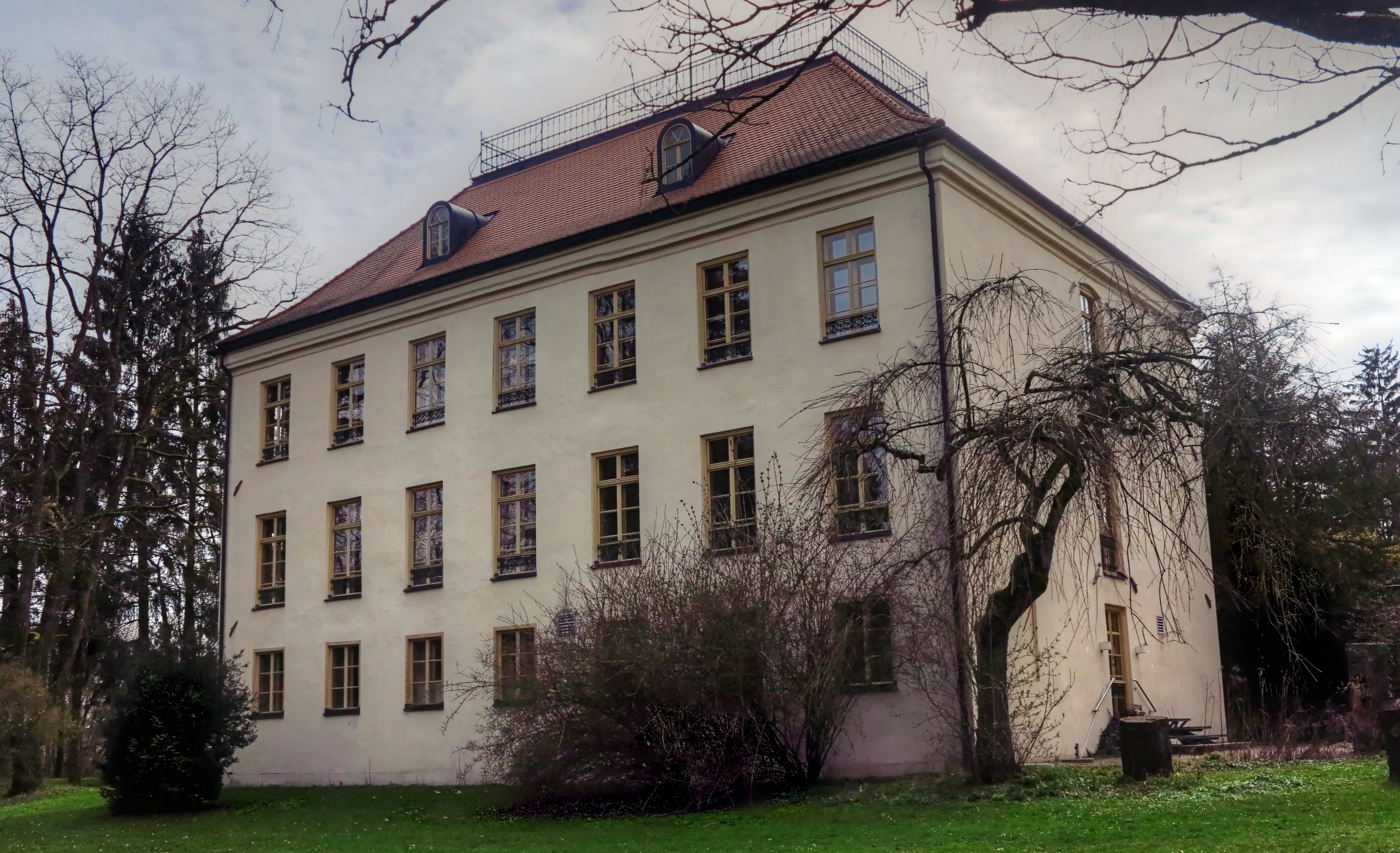
Rear of the house

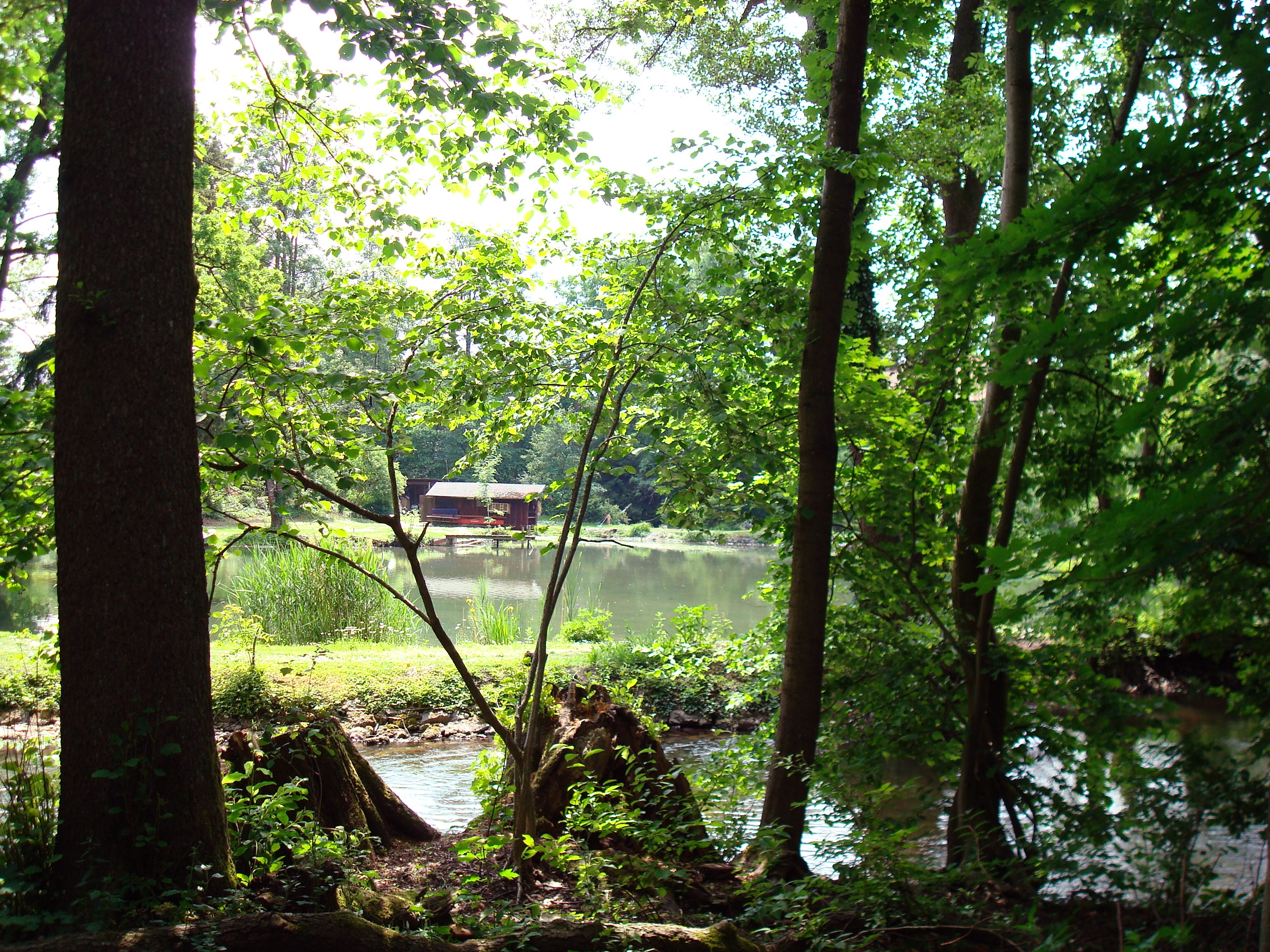
Pond and gardens

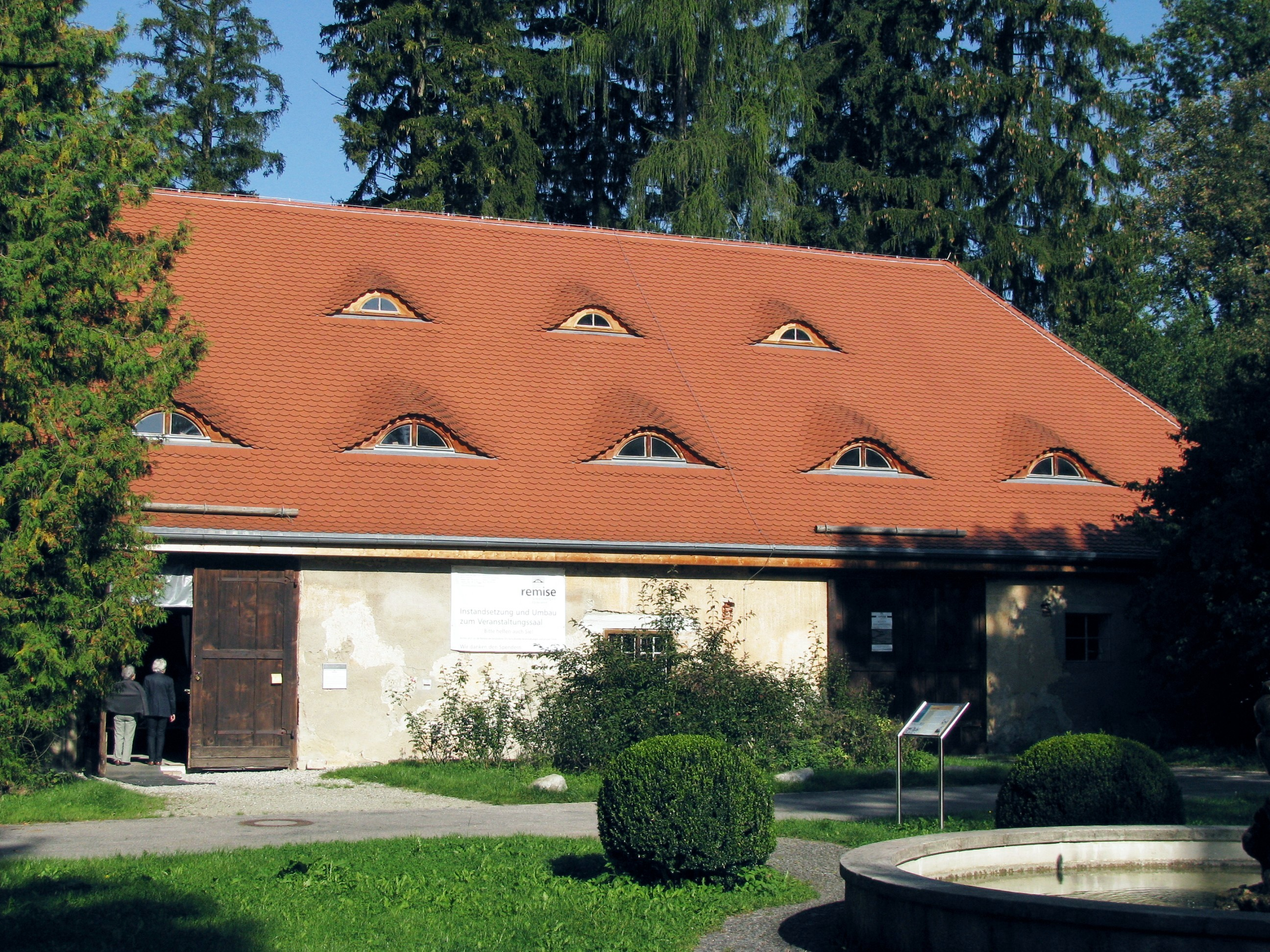
Coach house

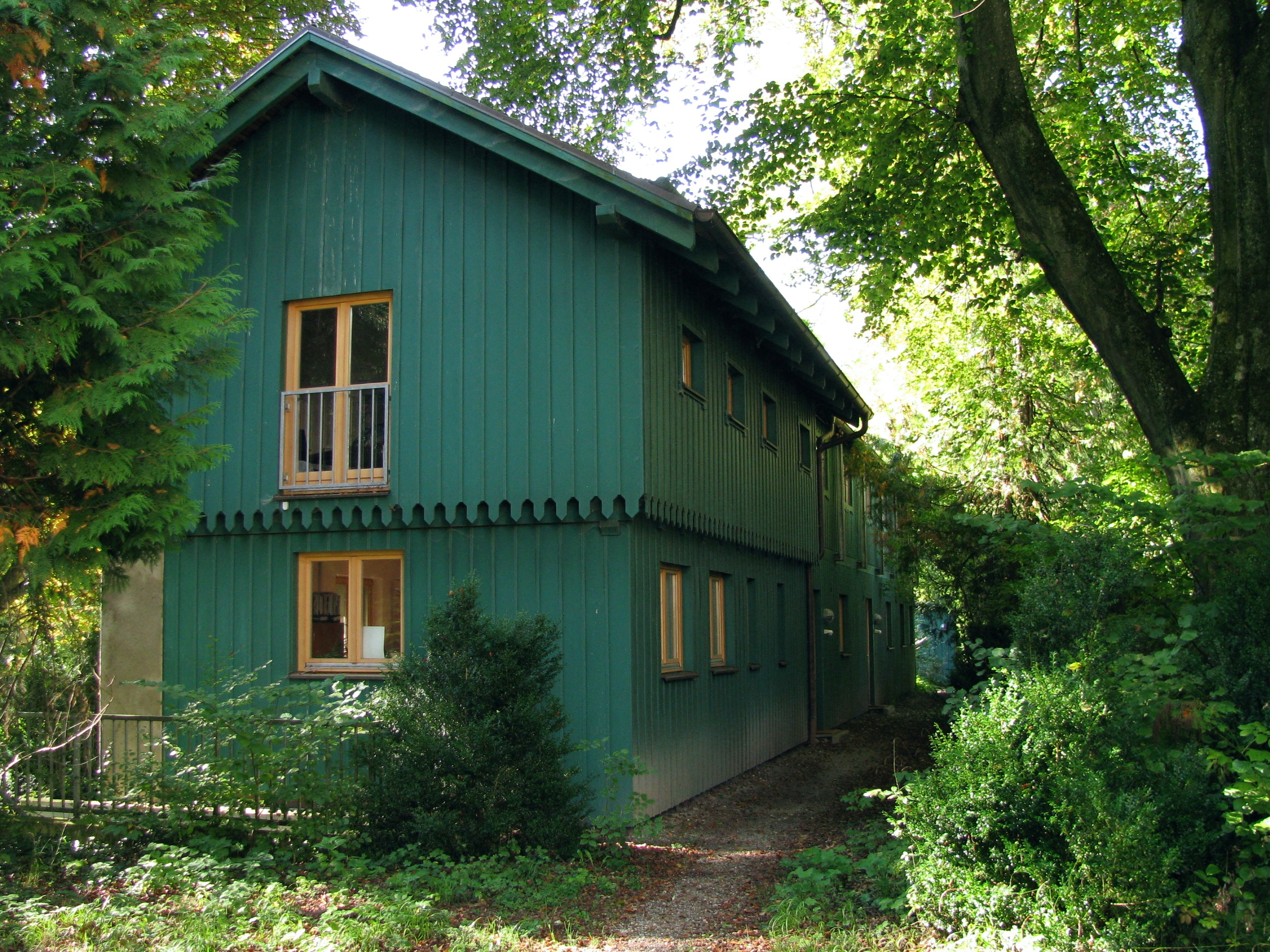
Salettl
