= Billy Williamson =

Billy Williamson may refer to:

- Billy Williamson (footballer, born 1922) (1922–2006), Scottish footballer (Rangers, St. Mirren and Stirling Albion)
- Billy Williamson (footballer, born 1952), Scottish footballer (Aberdeen, Dundee United and Dundee)
- Billy Williamson (guitarist) (1925–1996), American guitarist
- Billy P. Williamson, American football coach, 1898

== See also ==
- William Williamson (disambiguation)
