= Unterbrunn =

- Ortsteil of Gauting
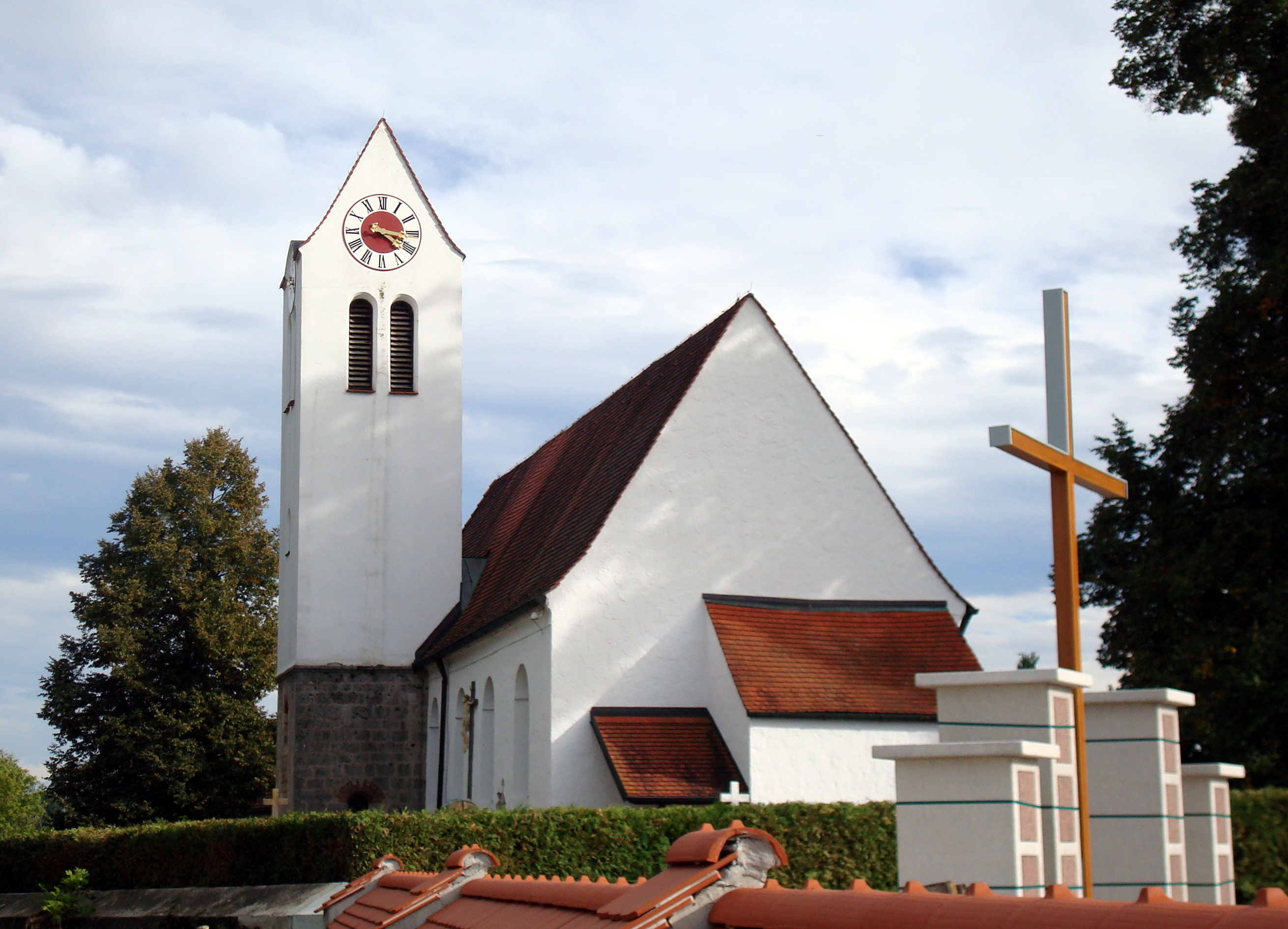
- Church of Saint Lawrence
- Interactive map of Unterbrunn
- Location within Germany Location within Bavaria
- Coordinates: 48°03′59.28″N 11°19′25.69″E
- Country: Germany
- State: Bavaria
- District: Starnberg
- Town: Gauting
- Time zone: UTC+01:00 (CET)
  - Summer (DST): UTC+02:00 (CEST)
- Website: www.unterbrunn.de

The village of Unterbrunn is an Ortsteil (quarter) of the municipality Gauting, in Bavaria, Germany. It lies close to and east of the Oberpfaffenhofen Airfield (with IATA code: OBF).

Unterbrunn has a Roman Catholic parish church with organ pipes housed above the ceiling. It also boasts a private museum, basically eclectic but with many historic farm implements.

== History ==
Maria Himmelfahrt Catholic church located in the center of Unterbrunn was built between 1872 and 1875 as a sandstone block building in Romanized forms.
