= Gauting Indians =

- Logo

Information
- League: Deutsche Baseball Liga (Süd)
- Location: Gauting
- Ballpark: Würmtal Baseball Platz
- Founded: 1991
- Colors: Dark blue, red and white
- Ownership: Sebastian Seigure
- General manager: Thomas Tietze
- Website: www.gauting-indians.de

Former logo

Gauting Indians Baseball und Softball Club e.V., commonly referred to as Gauting Indians, is a baseball and softball club from Gauting, a suburb of Munich. The club's first men's team currently plays in the first division of the Deutsche Baseball Liga. The team rose to the second division in 1996, and since 2004 has played in the first division.

== History ==
The Gauting Indians originated in 1991 as a baseball-focused school project at Gauting's Otto von Taube Gymnasium under the leadership of the future Bundesliga player Florian Deisenhofer. During its first year the group played a number of friendly games against baseball clubs in and around Munich.

The Gauting Indians were formally established as the baseball section of TSV Gauting on January 1, 1992, with an initial membership of 15. In its first year of official play, the Indians finished in first place with an undefeated record in the Landesliga Group A and were promoted to the Bayernliga (Bavarian League). Through reaching the Bayernliga for the 1993 season, the Gauting Indians saw their membership grow, allowing the club to begin offering youth baseball training.

In 1994 the Indians, in their second season in the Bayernliga, reached the final round of the Bavarian Cup. The performance allowed the club's men's team to be promoted to league play. In addition, the club saw similar success that year up and down the organization, seeing a junior team, a softball team and two youth teams also qualify for league play in their respective categories.

The Indians established a second men's team in 1995, giving the club six active teams in different leagues of the Bayerischer Baseball und Softball Verband (Bavarian Baseball and Softball Association). The first men's team finished in second place that year, up to that point the best finish in the club's history. One of the club's youth teams also secured third place in the German School Championships. The club also made its first entry to the international scene in 1995, playing in the Three Lands Tournament in Hungary. The search for a piece of land to construct a field to meet the requirements of the Deutscher Baseball and Softball Verband e.V. (DBV) was successful, and planning subsequently began for Wuermtal Baseball Park.

In 1996 the Indians were promoted to the second division of the Baseball Bundesliga. The club finished second, following the Memmelsdorfer Barons in the second division of the Bundesliga Southwest. In 1997, the first men's team was avoid relegation, finishing fourth with a 19-13 record. The second men's team was similarly unable to secure promotion.

In 1998 the club was able to field two softball teams for the first time, thanks to the incorporation of the Muenchen Academics. Wuermtal Baseball Park was also inaugurated in July of that year, becoming the permanent site of the Indians' home games.

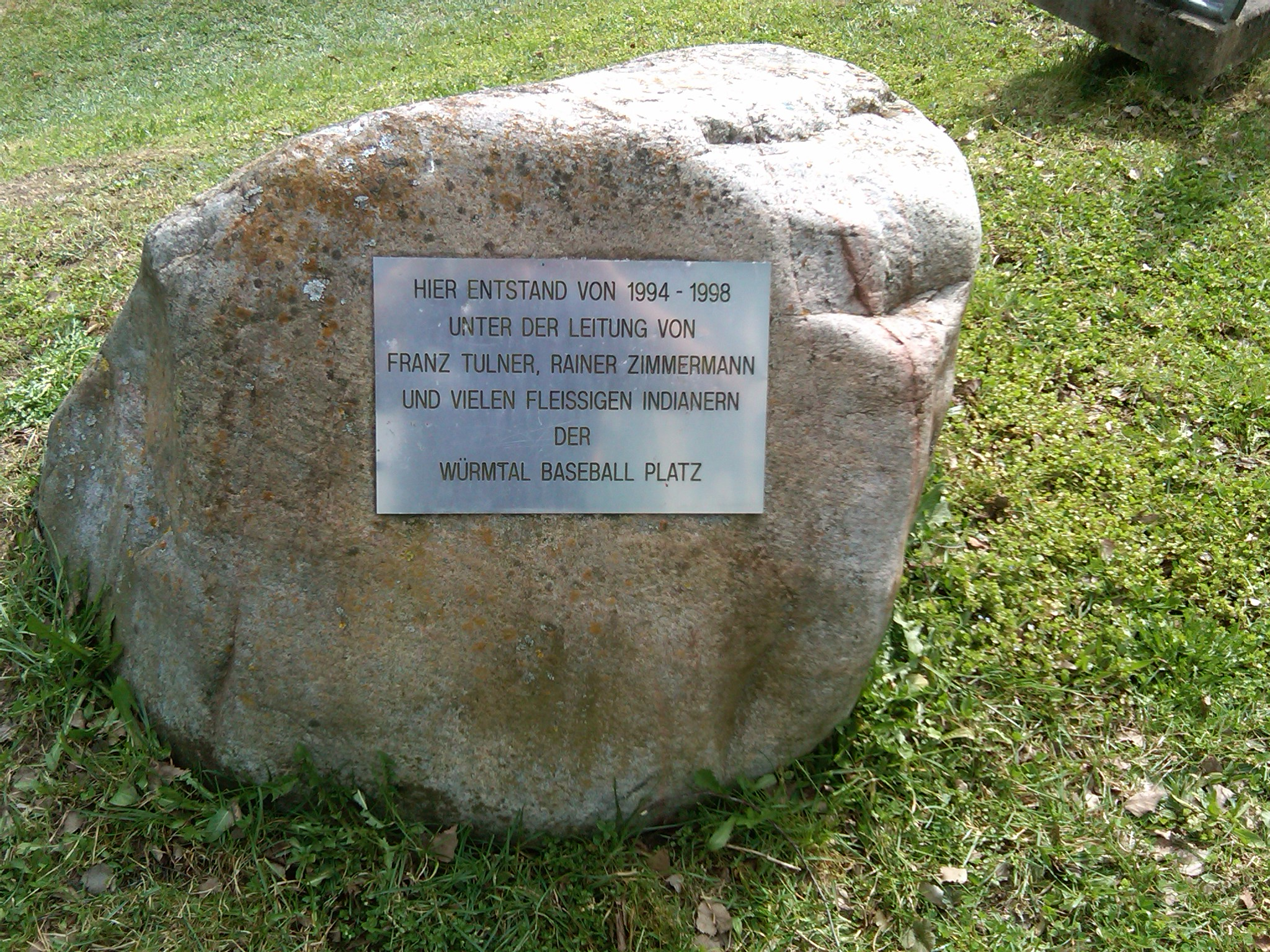
Plaque inscribing Wurmtal Baseball Platz

That year the second men's team was promoted, and the junior team notably took first place at the German Championships in Bonn, becoming the first junior Bavarian team to take the championship. The first men's team finished in seventh place in the second division of the Bundesliga South with a 16-20 record.

In 1999 the Indians were awarded DM10,000 by the Gruene Band of Dresdner Bank in recognition of its work fostering baseball talent. On February 20–21, Gauting hosted the first German championship for indoor baseball. 58 teams and over 60 players participated in the event, which has subsequently occurred annually in Gauting. The Indians finished first in three out of the four categories being used to assess teams in the tournament. The organization's junior and youth teams finished in first place while the women's softball team finished in third place. The first men's team also took on a foreign coach for the first time in club history, Canadian Mike Couliard, but finished in sixth place with a 20-16 record.

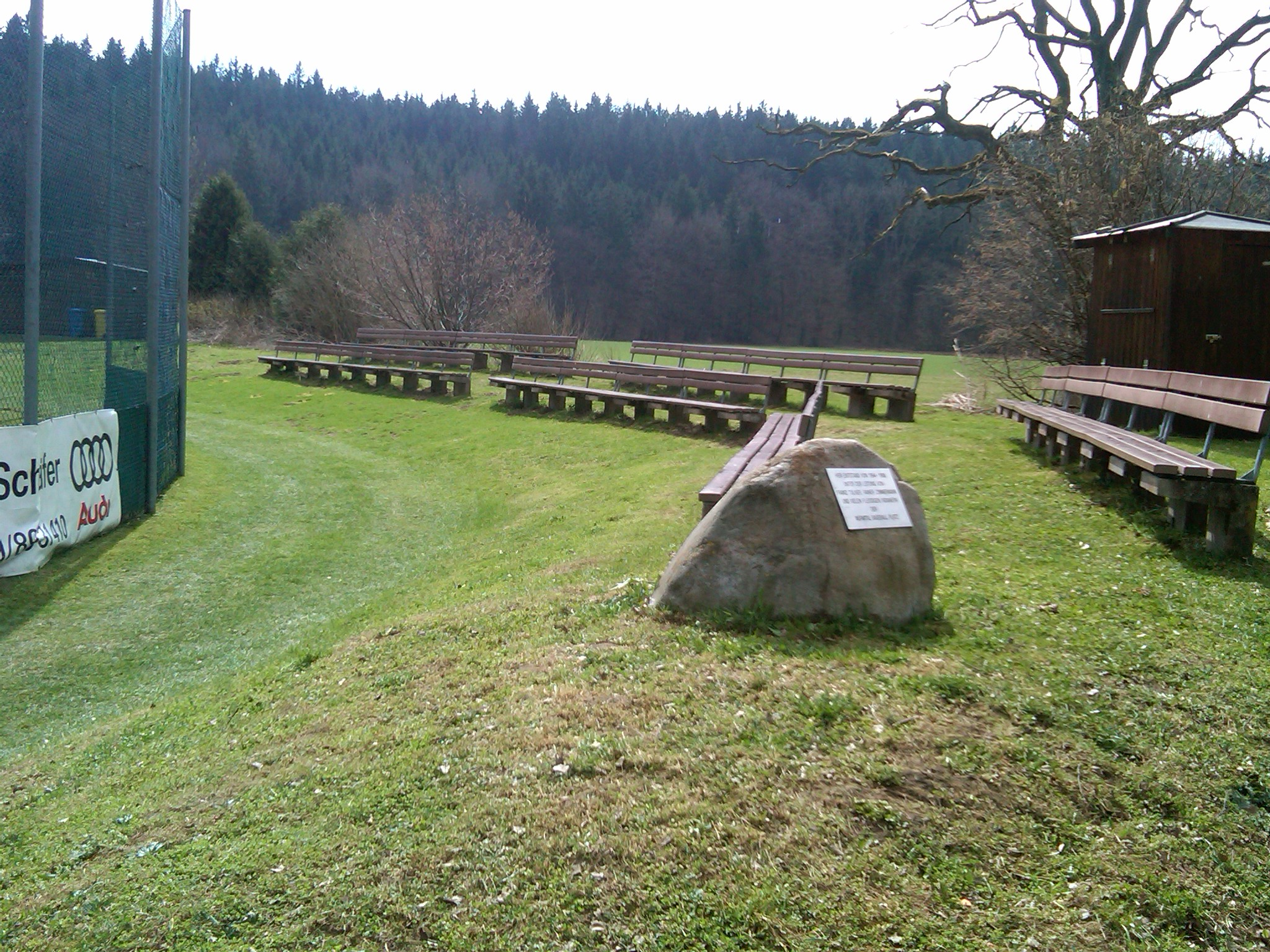
Seating behind home plate

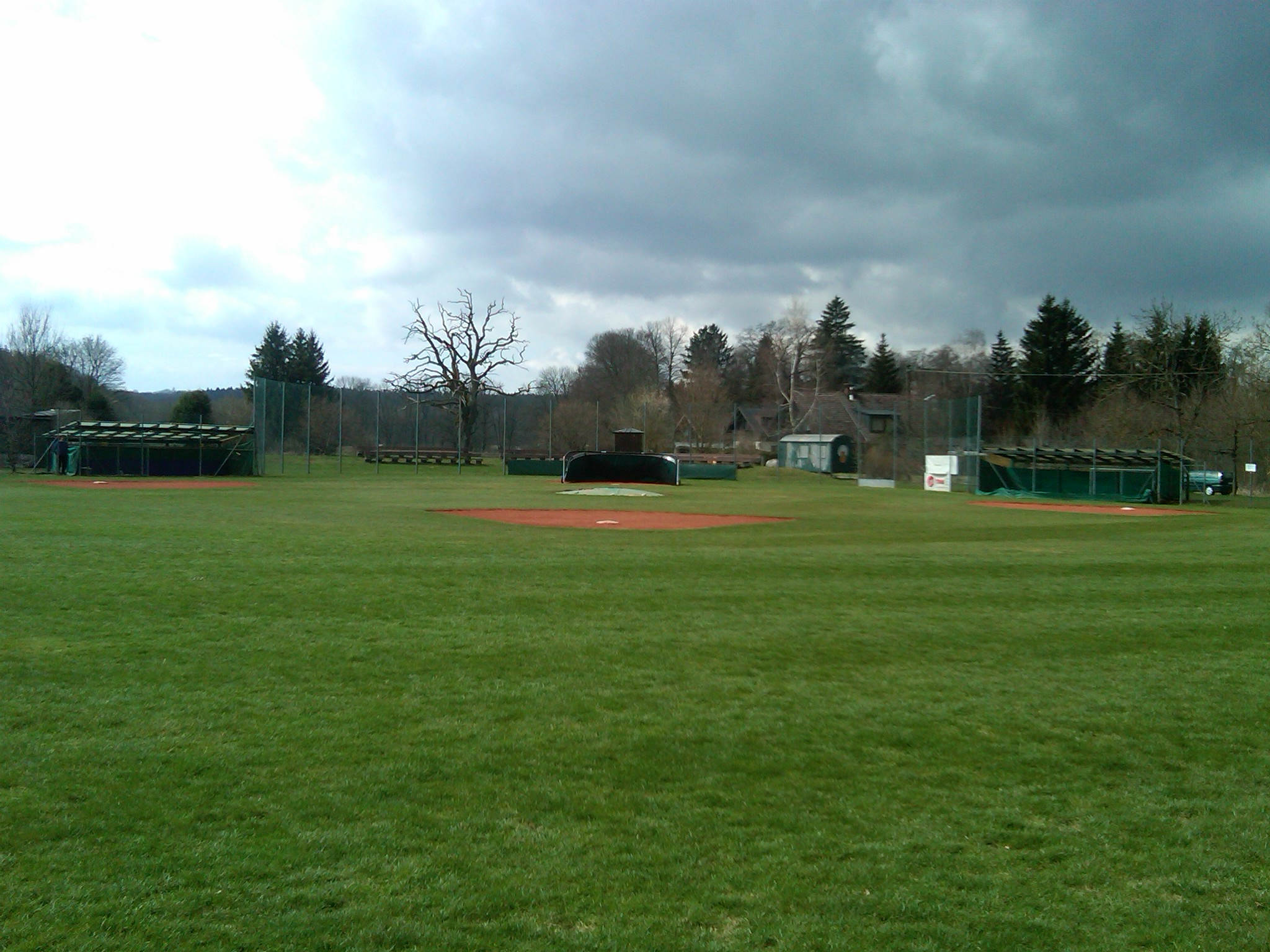
Wurmtal Baseball Platz

The club's first men's team failed to advance to the first division of the Baseball Bundesliga in 2000. Despite importing two American players, Cory Monroe and Marc Hagander, the first men's team finished in fifth place. However, the club's women's softball team the Squaws, named after a racial slur for indigenous American women, finished in second place and qualified for the German championship.

In 2001, seeking to avoid demotion, the first men's for the first time released a manager during the season. Coach Clemes Dauster was put on leave before a decisive final day of play. After winning this final contest, the Indians finished in eighth place could celebrate remaining in the second division.

In 2002, the second men's team was promoted to the Landesliga, the school team made it to the final game of the Bavarian championship, and the youth team won the Bavarian championship and represented the state for the third time in the German championship. They finished in second place to the Paderborn Untouchables. That year the Gauting Indians recorded 140 members participating in six teams in official play, ranking it among the three largest baseball clubs in Bavaria.

In 2003 the Indians expanded to nine teams in official play. Under coach Matthew Laack and with new Italian import Francesco Vitocco, the first men's team succeeded in advancing to the first division of the Bundesliga. The women's team voluntary accepted relegation from the Bundesliga back to the Bayernliga where they finished in third place.

In 2004, in their first season in the first division of the Baseball Bundesliga, the first men's team narrowly avoided demotion. The team had to play an elimination game following the season to determine what team would face relegation, but defeated the Ladenburg Romans to remain in the first division. The second men's team advanced to the Bayernliga, but the club endured the dissolution of the women's softball team, leaving the club without a women's softball team in 2005.

In 2005, the Indians sent eight teams into play, including five youth teams. The first men's team, under coach Michael Almstetter, and supported by imports Ben Regan, Tristan McDonald and Ryan Crotin, finished sixth place with a 19-21 record. The second men's team finished fourth in the Bayernliga.

== Season by season performance (1st Bundesliga) ==
Year	Rank	Games	W	L	Win%	Season Notes
2008	7	28	8	20	.285	
2009	7	24	6	18	.250	
2010	5	28	13	15	.464	
