= Buchendorf =

- Ortsteil of Gauting
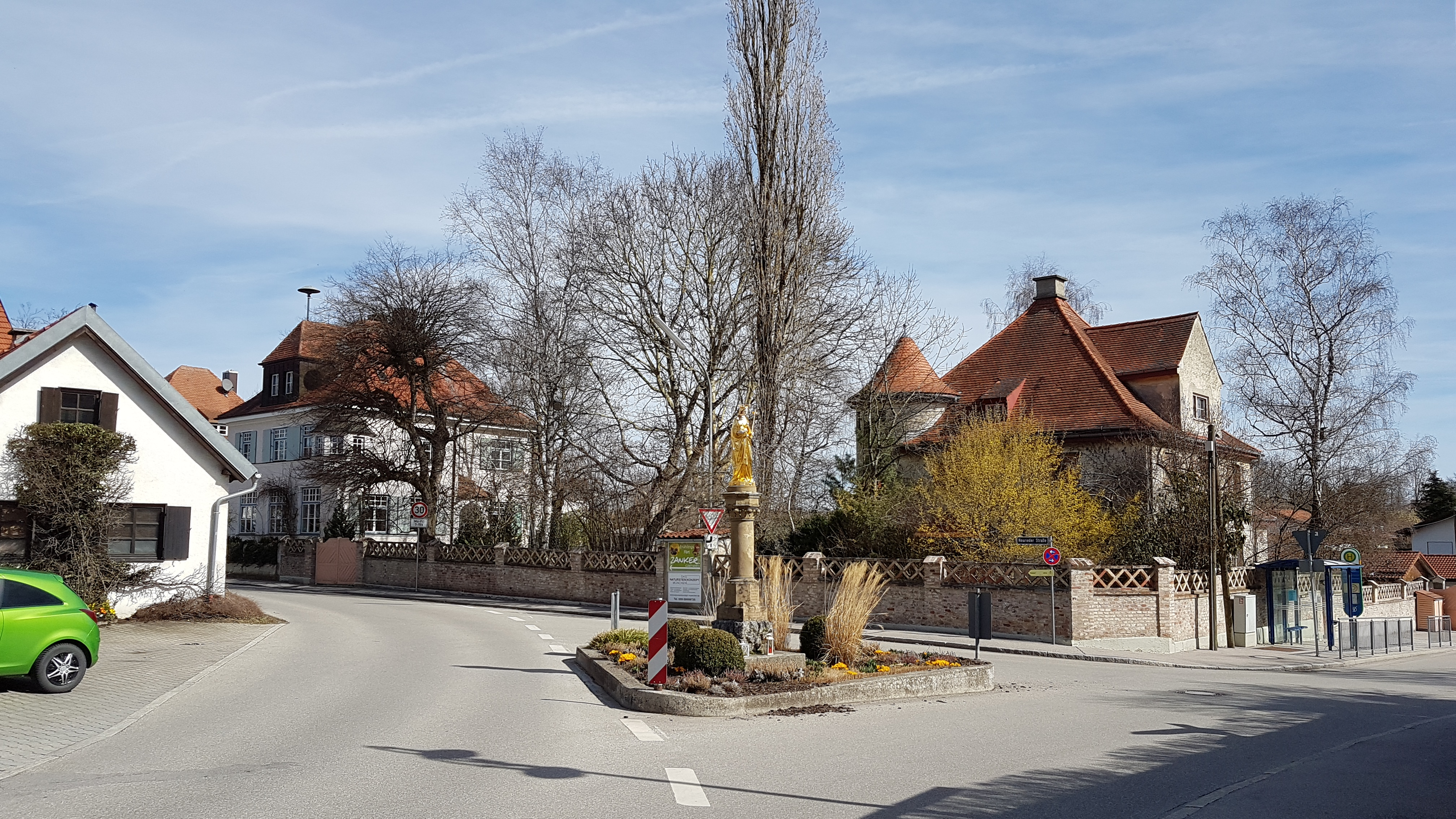
- Buchendorf
- Interactive map of Buchendorf
- Location within Germany Location within Bavaria
- Coordinates: 48°3′N 11°24′E
- Country: Germany
- State: Bavaria
- Admin. region: Oberbayern
- District: Starnberg
- Municipality: Gauting

Area
  - Total: 7.88 km^{2} (3.04 sq mi)
- Elevation: 584 m (1,916 ft)

Population (2021)
  - Total: 822
  - Density: 104/km^{2} (270/sq mi)
- Time zone: UTC+01:00 (CET)
  - Summer (DST): UTC+02:00 (CEST)
- Postal codes: 82131
- Dialling codes: 089

Buchendorf is a village and former municipality in the district of Starnberg in Bavaria, Germany. The village was incorporated into Gauting on 1 January 1978.
