= William Williamson (priest, born 1645) =

William Williamson (1645-1722) was an Irish Anglican priest in the late seventeenth century and the first three decades of the eighteenth.

Williamson was born in Dublin and educated at Trinity College Dublin. He was Archdeacon of Glendalough from 1762 until his death
