= Gauting =

- Municipality
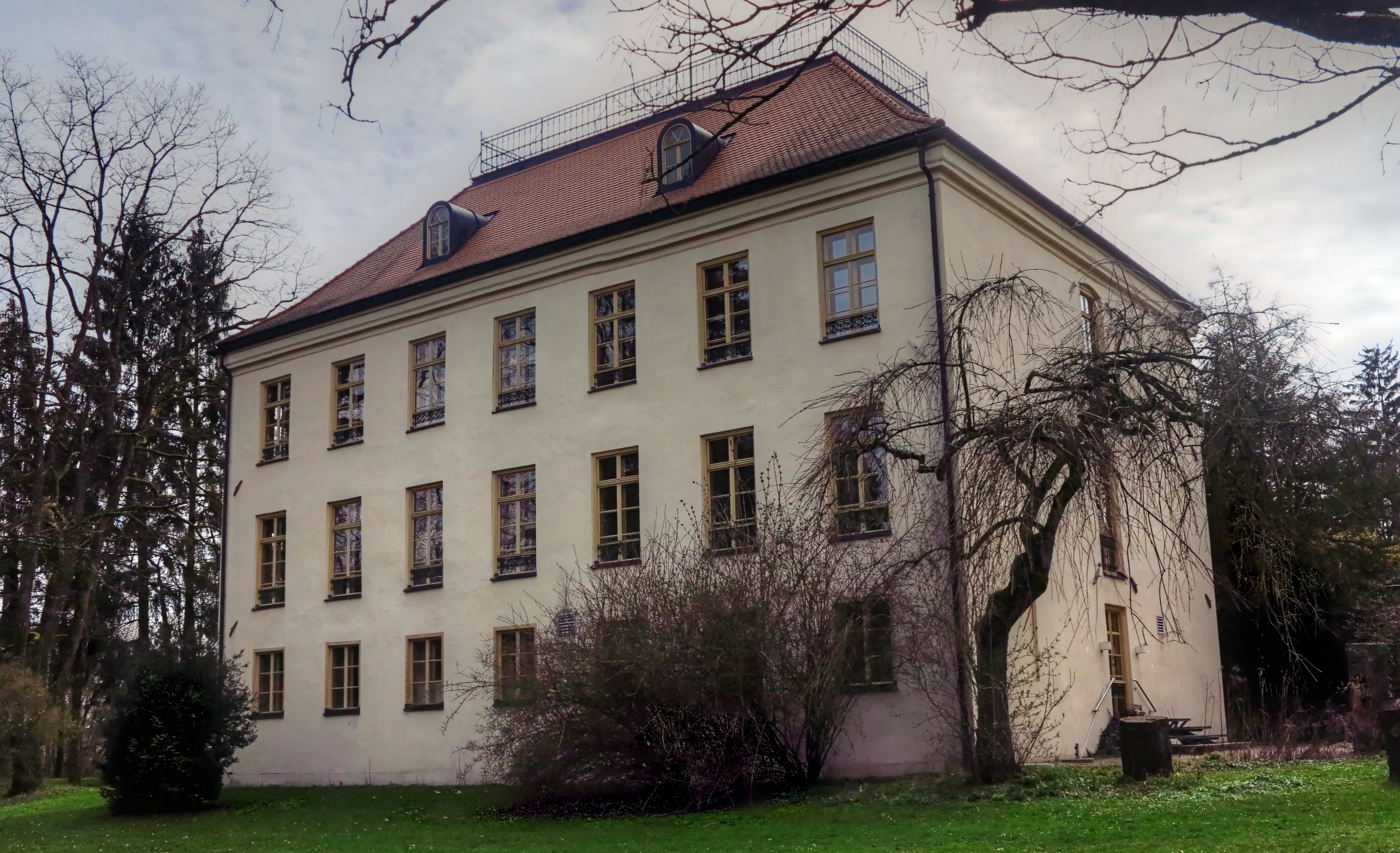
- Fußberg Castle

- Coat of arms

- Location of Gauting within Starnberg district
- Interactive map of Gauting
- Location within Germany Location within Bavaria
- Coordinates: 48°04′04″N 11°22′26″E
- Country: Germany
- State: Bavaria
- Admin. region: Oberbayern
- District: Starnberg

Government
  - Mayor (2020–26): Dr. Brigitte Kössinger (CSU)

Area
  - Total: 55.5 km^{2} (21.4 sq mi)
- Elevation: 564 m (1,850 ft)

Population (2025-12-31)
  - Total: 21,684
  - Density: 391/km^{2} (1,010/sq mi)
- Time zone: UTC+01:00 (CET)
  - Summer (DST): UTC+02:00 (CEST)
- Postal codes: 82131
- Dialling codes: 089
- Vehicle registration: STA
- Website: www.gauting.de

Gauting (German pronunciation: [ˈɡaʊtɪŋ]) is a municipality in the district of Starnberg, in Bavaria, Germany with a population of more than 20,000 inhabitants. It is situated on the river Würm, 17 kilometres (11 mi) southwest of Munich and is a part of the Munich metropolitan area.

== Geography ==
Stockdorf, Grubmühl, Buchendorf, Königswiesen, Hausen, Unterbrunn and Oberbrunn are included under the administration of Gauting. The municipality itself is surrounded by the Forstenrieder Park in the east, Mühltal in the south, Kreuzlinger Forst in the west and Grubmühl in the north.

== History ==
Although the name, Gauting, is first mentioned in 753, settlements in the Gauting area traces back to early Bronze Age and is thus amongst the earliest in upper Bavaria. Cairns in Stockdorf and a large Celtic entrenchment offer evidence of the prehistoric dwellings.

Under the Roman Empire the settlement, then called Bratananium, marked a major crossroad of Via Julia, which connected the provincial capital Augusta Vindelicorum (Augsburg) with Juvavum (Salzburg) and Lake Constance. Many artifacts from that time have been discovered.

A persistent local belief is that Charlemagne was born at the Reismühle, situated at the south edge of Gauting, thus the imperial crown appears in Gauting's coat of arms.

For many years, Gauting existed as a small rural village nestled in the Würm valley. A dramatic rise in population started with the opening of the Munich-Starnberg railroad in 1854. Gauting became popular as a weekend and holiday resort for wealthy citizens of the Bavarian capital, and since then it has become one of the most popular suburban communities adjoining Munich.

=== Gauting during the Third Reich ===
The abolition of the German Communist Party, immediately following the enabling act that gave the Nazi Party dictatorial powers, was one of the first administrative acts to be executed in Gauting in 1933. Soon each member of the communal council had to become a member of the NSDAP. Adolf Hitler and Adolf Wagner, the Gauleiter (district governor) of Upper Bavaria, who lived at Gauting, became honorary citizens. Hermann Nafziger was installed as Nazi-mayor. During the last days of World War II, the 8,000 surviving inmates of the Dachau concentration camp were sent on a so-called death march. Such marches were organized by order of Heinrich Himmler to prevent the inmates from being freed by the approaching allied troops. Many of the hostages died on the way through Gauting to their destination in Bad Tölz. The peaceful invasion of the US forces was possible due to the surrender of Hans Penzl of the Freiheitsaktion Bayern, a Bavarian resistance cell. After the war, the special military hospital for tuberculosis, situated in a former barracks building, was used in 1945 for treating the survivors of the concentration camps by the US Forces. Since many of the casualties were Jewish, a separate Jewish Cemetery was established in Gauting, next to the main cemetery.

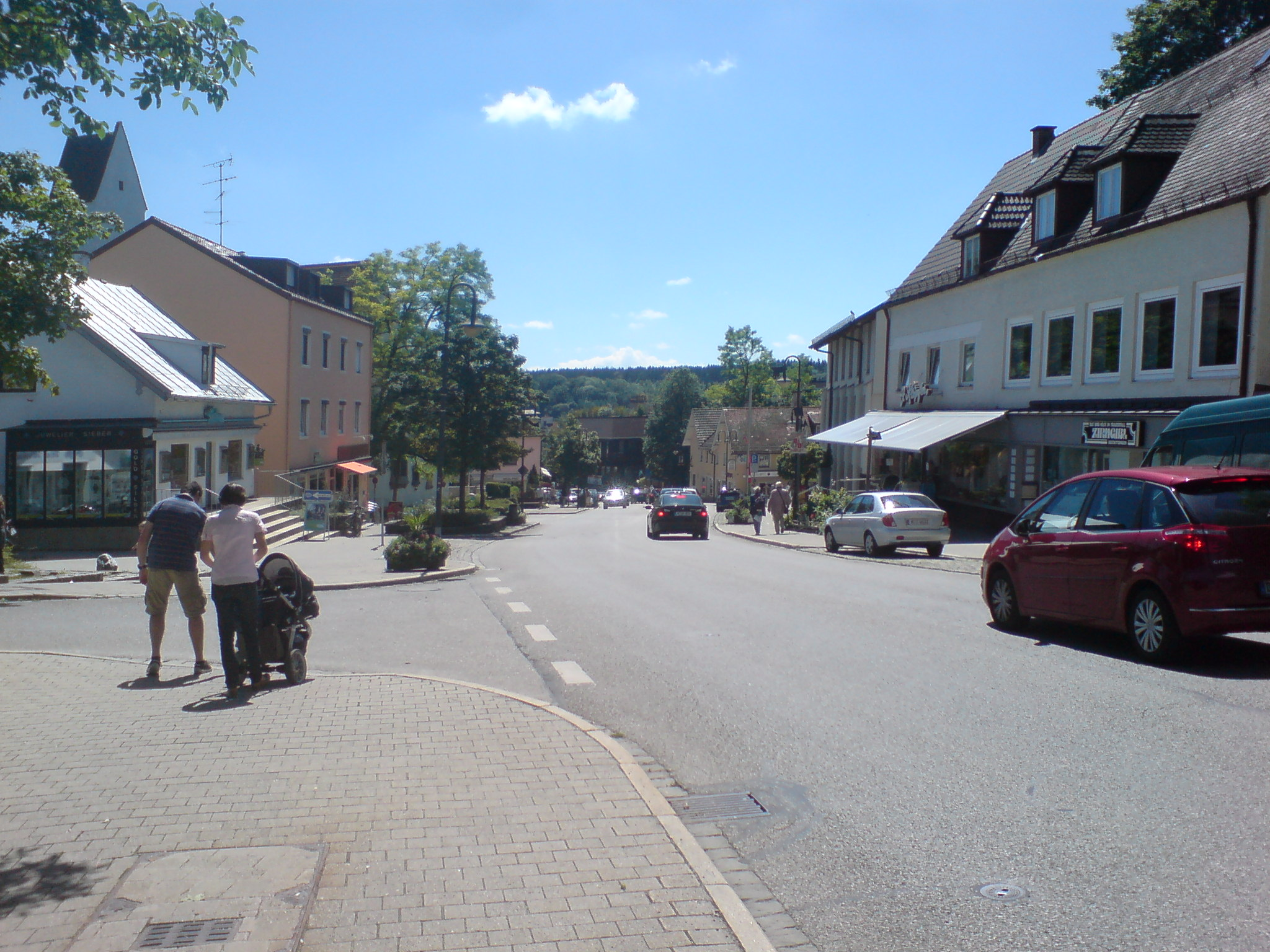
Center of Gauting

== Politics and Economy ==
=== Mayor ===
- 1st Mayor (Erste Bürgermeisterin) Dr. Brigitte Kössinger (CSU)
- 2nd Mayor (Zweiter Bürgermeister) Dr. Jürgen Sklarek (SPD)

=== Communal Council ===
Seats in the communal council
| Year | SPD | CSU | Green | FDP | UBG | FBG | BIG | ÖDP | MfG/Piraten | MiFü | independent | total | turnout (in %) |
|---|---|---|---|---|---|---|---|---|---|---|---|---|---|
| 2020 | 2 | 9 | 8 | 3 | 2 | 0 | 0 | 0 | 3 | 3 | 0 | 30 | 61,1 |
| 2014 | 3 | 9 | 4 | 2 | 1 | 0 | 1 | 1 | 1 | - | 2 | 24 | 59,1 |
| 2008 | 6 | 8 | 3 | 2 | 1 | 1 | 3 | 0 | 0 | - | 0 | 24 | 60,0 |
| 2002 | 6 | 9 | 2 | 3 | 2 | 2 | 0 | 0 | 0 | - | 0 | 24 | 61,8 |

UBG = Unabhängige Bürger Gauting
FBG = Freie Bürgergemeinschaft Gauting
BIG = Bürger in Gauting
MiFü = Miteinander Füreinander
MfG/Piraten = Menschen für Gauting / Piraten (2002-2014 Piraten)

=== Town Partnerships ===
- Clermont-l'Hérault in the Province of Languedoc (France)
- Patchway in South Gloucestershire (England)

=== Bundesnachrichtendienst ===
The German Federal Intelligence Service Bundesnachrichtendienst operates its electronic intelligence department from Stockdorf. During the Cold War, the base was camouflaged as Bundesstelle für Fernmeldestatistik (Federal Institute for Radio Statistics).

== Buildings ==
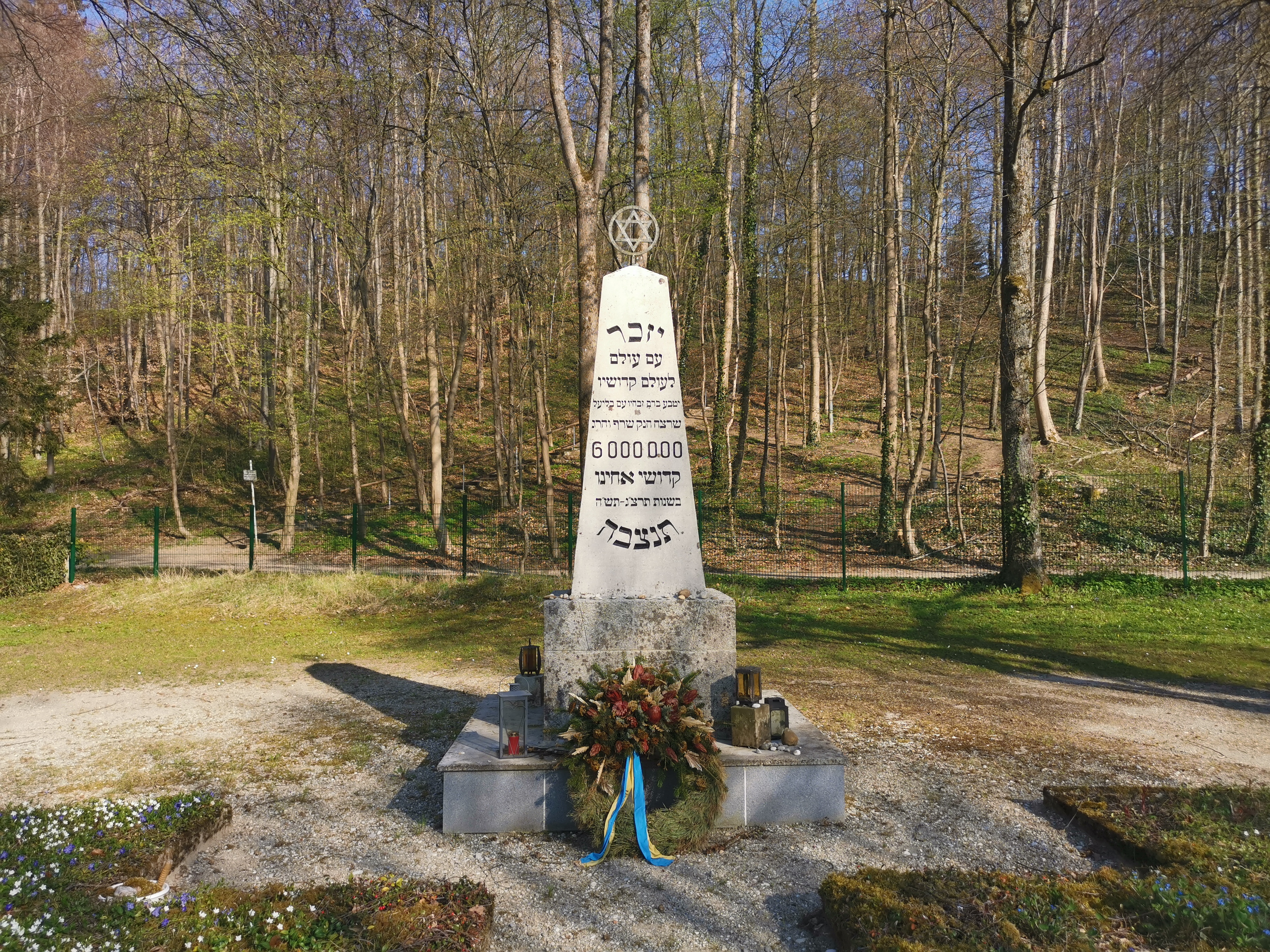
Holocaust Memorial in Gauting at the Jewish cemetery

- Schloss Fußberg, medieval mansion, restructured 1721 and 1894
- Frauenkirche, 15th century, restructured in the 18th century
- Church of St. Benedikt, given as beneficence to Benediktbeuern monastery in the 9th century; was rebuilt in Gothic style (15th century); the present building dates to 1934 and was erected in Nazi style by architect Georg Buchner
- Villa Zerboni ca. 1905 and many representative houses in the so-called "Kolonie" historicistic or Art Nouveau style between 1900 and 1914
- Villa Junkers, built in 1923 by Bernhard Borst in historistic style, later owned by Hugo Junkers

== Sports ==
Gauting is home to the Gauting Indians baseball team, which plays in the first division of the Baseball Bundesliga.

There is a small skate park in the town with a wooden miniramp.

== Transport ==
The municipality has two railway stations: Gauting and Stockdorf. Both are served by the S6 line of the Munich S-Bahn.

== Personalities ==
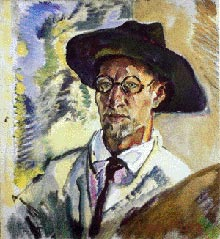
Leo Putz 1914 Self-portrait

- Violinist Julia Fischer lives in Gauting.
- The prize-winner of the Kurzfilm-Oscars 2001 (Quiero ser), Florian Gallenberger, comes from the district of Stockdorf
- Actress Friedl Haerlin was born on 29 December 1901 in Gauting
- Aircraft engineer Hugo Junkers died on 3 February 1935 in Gauting
- Olympic canoeist Ernst Krebs was born on 4 November 1906 in Gauting. He took the gold medal in the kayak-one over 10.000 m at the Olympic Summer Games 1936
- In the 1960s, Loriot lived for several years in the Leo-Putz-Haus, before he moved to a home at Lake Starnberg
- Footballer Rudolf Nafziger was born in Gauting in 1945 and died there in 2008.
- The artist Leo Putz lived in the 1920s in Gauting, where he was also buried
- The Catholic dogmatist Michael Schmaus died in 1993 in Gauting
- Peter Rubin (songwriter) (bourgeois: Peter Kohlhuber), singer, presenter and guitarist, lives in Stockdorf
- Hans-Werner Sinn is an economist, was president of the Ifo Institute for Economic Research 1999-2016
- The actor and lawyer Michael Wolf (actor) lives and practices in Gauting
- Martin Zeil was a member of the Bavarian Landtag for the FDP. From 2008 to 2013 he was Bavarian Minister of State for Economy, Infrastructure, Transport and Technology, and Deputy Prime Minister in the Seehofer Cabinet
- Industrialist Ernst Zimmermann (businessman) was assassinated on 1 February 1985 in his apartment in Gauting by the RAF
