= William Williamson (priest, born 1697) =

Irish Anglican priest

William Williamson (1697–1765) was an Anglican priest in Ireland during the 18th century, most notably serving as Archdeacon of Kildare from 1737 until his death.

Williamson was born in County Antrim and educated at Trinity College, Dublin. He was appointed Treasurer of Christ Church Cathedral, Dublin, in 1705 and became the 4th Canon of Kildare Cathedral in 1720. He is buried at St. Audoen's Church, Dublin.
