= Würm (Amper) =

River in Germany

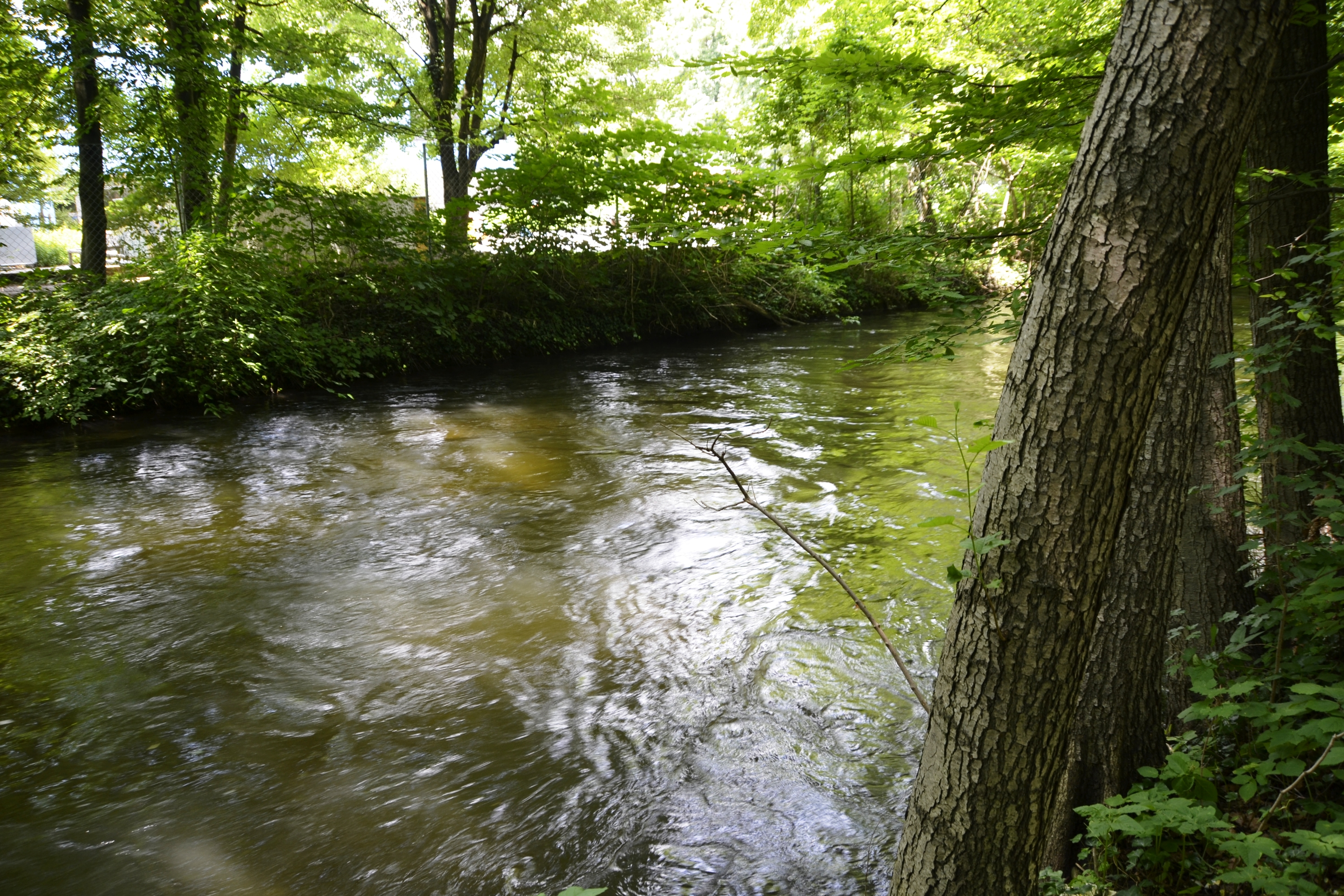
- The Würm in Pasing

Location
- Country: Germany
- State: Bavaria

Physical characteristics
- Mouth
  - location: Amper
  - coordinates: 48.2849°N 11.4745°E
- Length: 39.8 km (24.7 mi)
- Basin size: 429 km^{2} (166 sq mi)

Basin features
- Progression: Amper→ Isar→ Danube→ Black Sea

The Würm (German pronunciation: [vʏʁm]) is a river in Bavaria, Germany, right tributary of the Amper. The length of the river is 39.8 kilometres (24.7 mi), or 76.3 kilometres (47.4 mi) including the Steinbach, the main feed of Lake Starnberg. It drains the overflow from Lake Starnberg and flows swiftly through the villages of Gauting, Krailling, Planegg, Gräfelfing and Lochham as well as part of Munich (in the borough of Pasing) before joining, near Dachau, the Amper, which soon afterwards flows into the Isar and eventually into the Danube. Although the Würm is not a very large river, it is well known as it gave its name to the Würm glaciation.

A small man-made channel extracts water from the river at Pasing to feed the water features at Nymphenburg Palace, before flowing on to join the Isar at the public park Englischer Garten in Munich.

== See also ==
- List of rivers of Bavaria
