= Werdenfelser Land =

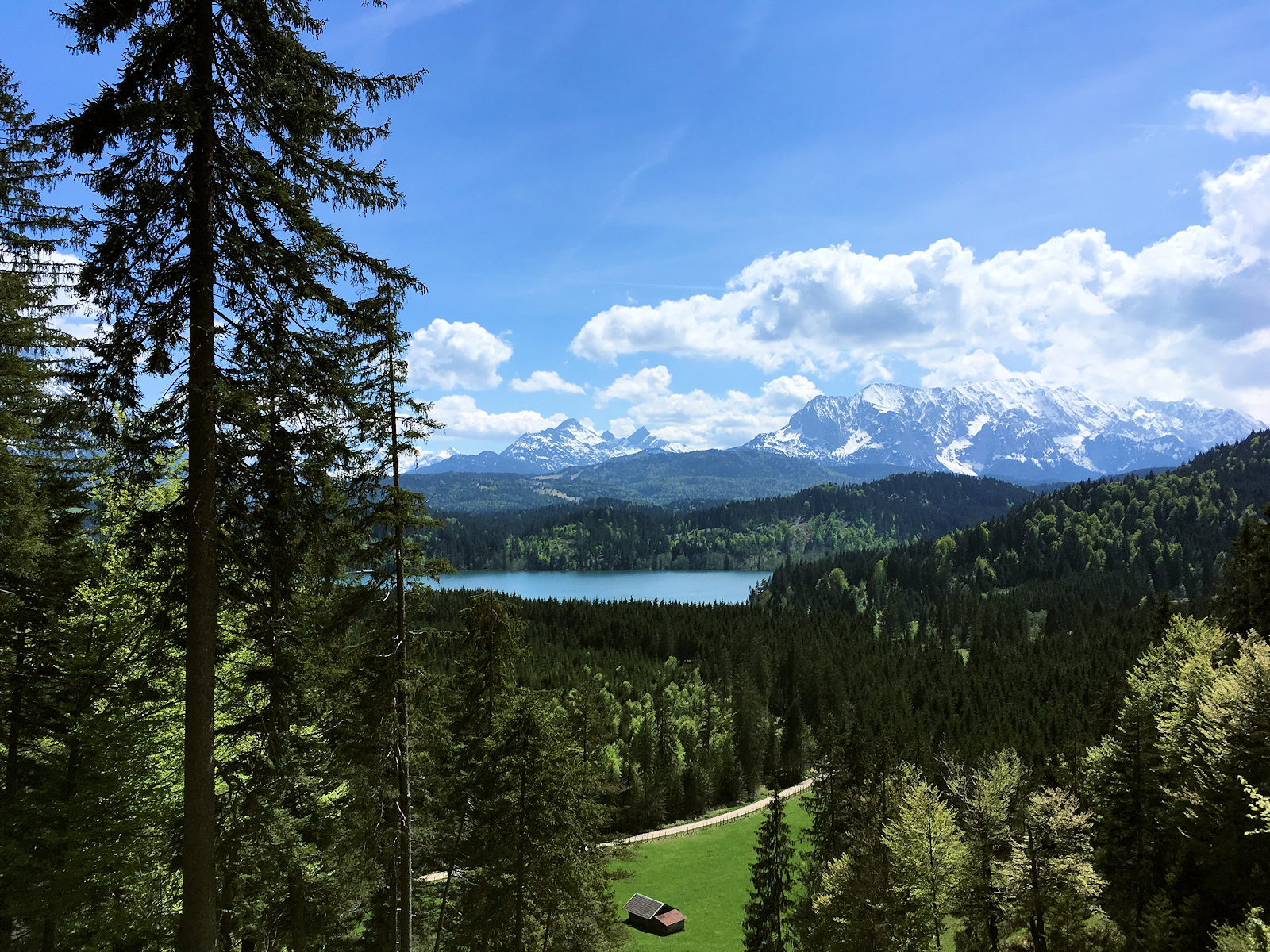
Werdenfelser Land

The Werdenfelser Land is a region of Upper Bavaria that extends from Mittenwald in the south to Farchant. It includes parts of the Bavarian Alps. From the Middle Ages until the Thirty Years' War, the Werdenfelser Land was subject to the Prince-Bishop of Freising, not the Duke of Bavaria.

The region derives its name from the medieval Werdenfels Castle north of Garmisch-Partenkirchen. The castle acted chiefly to secure the military and trade route that ran through the Loisach valley and linked trading posts in Italy and Upper Bavaria. It is sometimes called the Goldener Land after the wealth derived in the Middle Ages and Renaissance from the traffic along this Rottstraße, the main route over the Alps to Augsburg.

== Municipalities ==
Garmisch-Partenkirchen

The cultural centre of the land is the town Garmisch-Partenkirchen. The following municipalities also belong to Werdenfelser Land proper:

- Farchant
- Grainau
- Krün
- Wallgau
- Mittenwald

Werdenfelser territory, or at least culture, is also by some sources said to include the Ammertal municipalities of:

- Ettal
- Oberammergau
- Unterammergau

The widest definition includes all of the Loisach and Ammer valleys as far north as the edge of the Alps along the line of the Bayersoiener See-Staffelsee-Riegsee lakes, incorporating the additional municipalities of:

- Oberau
- Eschenlohe
- Bad Kohlgrub
- Saulgrub
- Bad Bayersoien
- Ohlstadt
- Schwaigen
- Seehausen
- Uffing
- Murnau
- Großweil

== Geography ==
The southern Werdenfelser Land is bordered by the Wetterstein Mountains and the Karwendel. The Zugspitze lies southwest of Garmisch-Partenkirchen and, at 2,962 m above sea level (NN), is the highest peak in Germany. Both the valleys and the Alpine Foreland have been heavily influenced by the last ice age. The lakes were partially formed by groundwater filling the hollows carved out by the glaciers. Later the lakes silted up and formed moors like the Murnauer Moos.

== History ==
In the early Iron Age the Werdenfelser Land was settled by Illyrians. Even at this early stage there were close contacts with Upper Italy over the route of the present-day Brenner-Scharnitz road. From about 500 B.C. Celts invaded this region and mixed with the indigenous population. The Romans in turn conquered the Celts around 15 B.C. and annexed the region to the Province of Raetia. Occasionally the Romans adopted settlement and river names of Veneto-Illyrian or Celtic origin, some of which have survived to the present day (Partenkirchen – Partanum, Isar – Isara). The trade route that was already established by 195 A. D. was upgraded. The Via Claudia Augusta now ran from Augsburg via Partenkirchen and Mittenwald to the Brenner Pass and continued to Bozen (Pons Drusi), where it formed a junction with the older Reschen Pass branch. The Roman road station of Partanum was the predecessor of modern-day Partenkirchen. After the collapse of the Roman Empire and the end of the Migration Period, Bajuwaren settled from about the 6th century A.D. in the valleys.

Werdenfels Castle, erected by Duke Otto of Wittelsbach in 1180 northwest of Partenkirchen, was transferred in 1294 to the Prince-Bishopric of Freising. Control of the northern approaches of the important European trading route by the Freising archbishopric enabled the population of the County of Werdenfels to become relatively wealthy over a long period of time.

With the onset of the Modern Period there was a significant economic boom as a result of stronger trade relations with Italy (see also: Fugger, Welser). The nickname Goldenes Landl ("Little Golden Land") for the Werdenfelser Land comes from this period. This development was ended by the Thirty Years' War and the population became impoverished. Later wars, such as the Wars of the Spanish and Austrian Succession in the early 18th century and Napoleonic Wars of the 19th century, also severely affected the population. In 1803, as a result of Napoleonic rule, the Prince-Bishopric of Freising was toppled and the Werdenfelser Land was given to Bavaria.

1889 saw the advent of a new source of income as the new railway link with Munich brought tourists to the region.

== Sources ==
- Wolfgang Wüst: Umbruch im Goldenen Landl vor 200 Jahren. Der Markt Partenkirchen und die Grafschaft Werdenfels im Säkularisationstrauma, in: Mohr – Löwe – Raute. Beiträge zur Geschichte des Landkreises Garmisch-Partenkirchen 11, hg. v. Verein für Geschichte, Kunst und Kulturgeschichte im Landkreis e. V., Garmisch-Partenkirchen 2006, pp. 141-162.
