= Görmar =

- Ortsteil of Mühlhausen
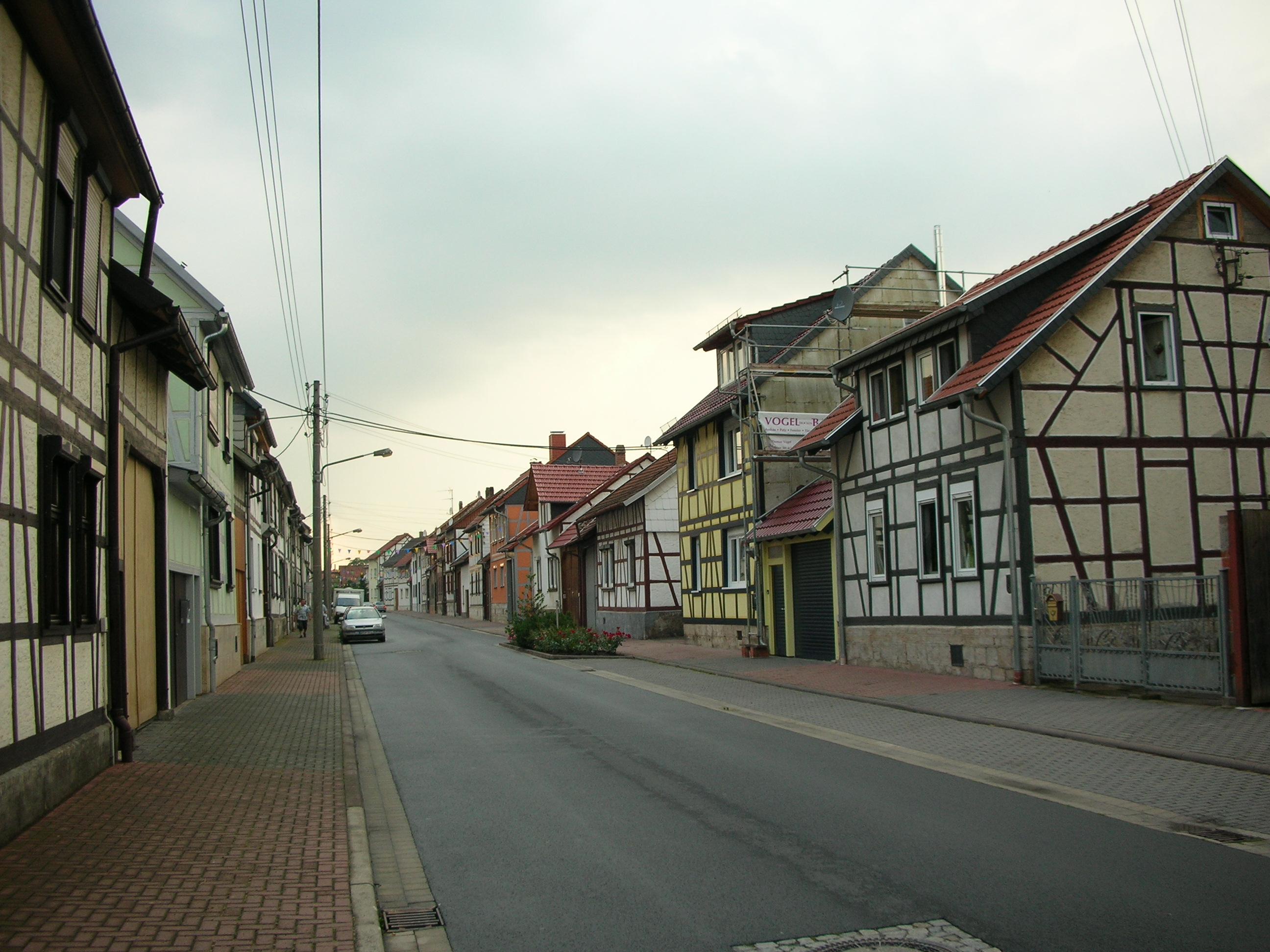
- A street in Görmar
- Interactive map of Görmar
- Location within Germany Location within Thuringia
- Coordinates: 51°12′41″N 10°29′28″E
- Country: Germany
- State: Thuringia
- District: Unstrut-Hainich-Kreis
- Town: Mühlhausen
- First mentioned: 897

Government
  - Mayor: Jörg Schreiber
- Elevation: 196 m (643 ft)

Population (March 2021)
  - Total: 943
- Time zone: UTC+01:00 (CET)
  - Summer (DST): UTC+02:00 (CEST)
- Postal codes: 99974
- Dialling codes: 03601
- Vehicle registration: UH, LSZ, MHL
- Website: muehlhausen.de

Görmar (pronounced [ˈɡœʁmaɐ̯]) is a village and a quarter of the town of Mühlhausen in Thuringia, central Germany.

== Geography ==
Görmar is located to the east of the core town of Mühlhausen on the Bundesstraße (federal highway) 249 to Sondershausen. The village is located in the Thuringian Basin not far from the Unstrut river in an agricultural area. There is hardly any forest in the intensively used gently undulating terrain. The climate is mild, with low precipitation with mostly groundwater-influenced soils.

== History ==
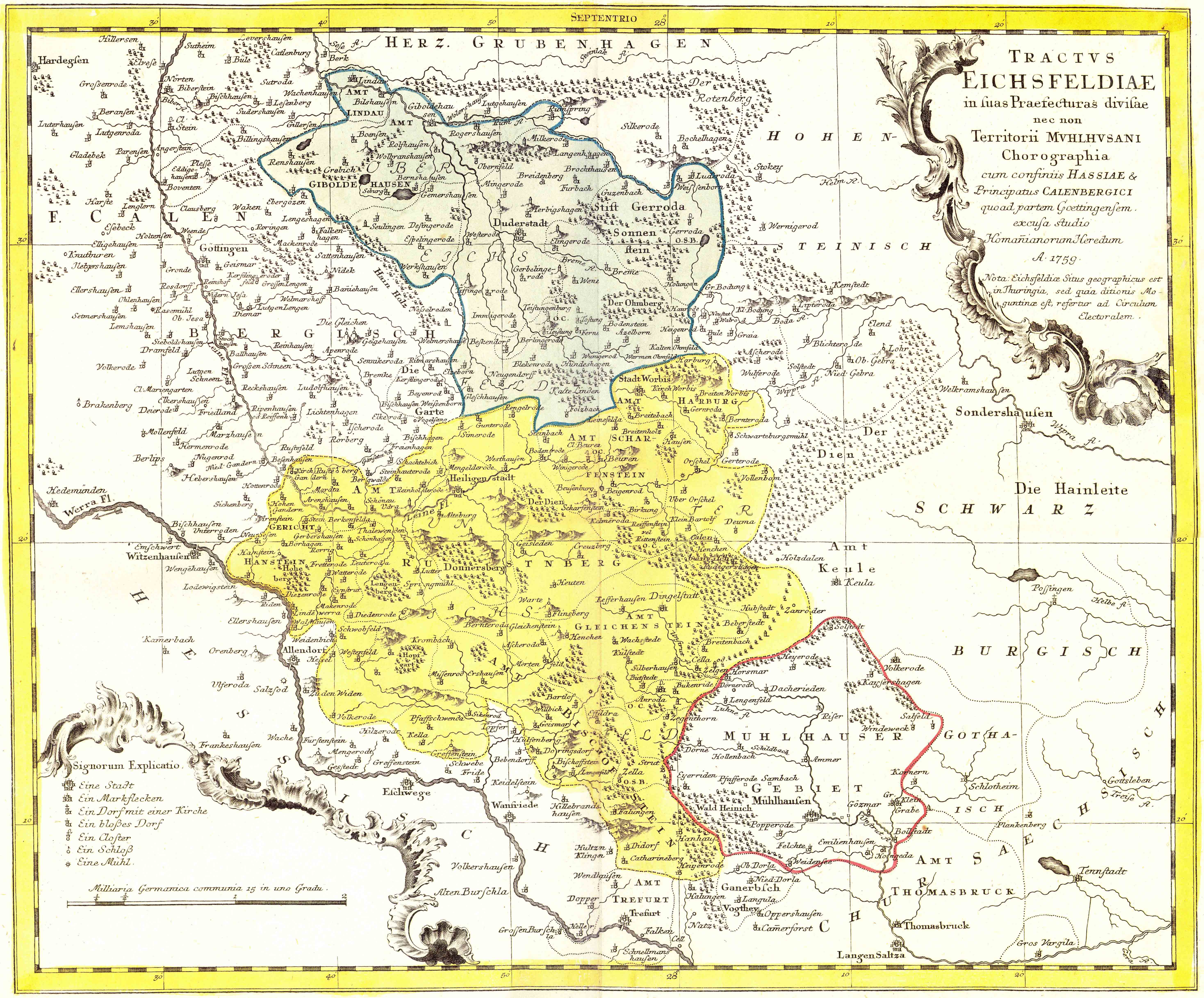
The Eichsfeld region and the territory of the Reichsstadt (imperial city) of Mühlhausen with Görmar around 1759 (The map contains some errors.)

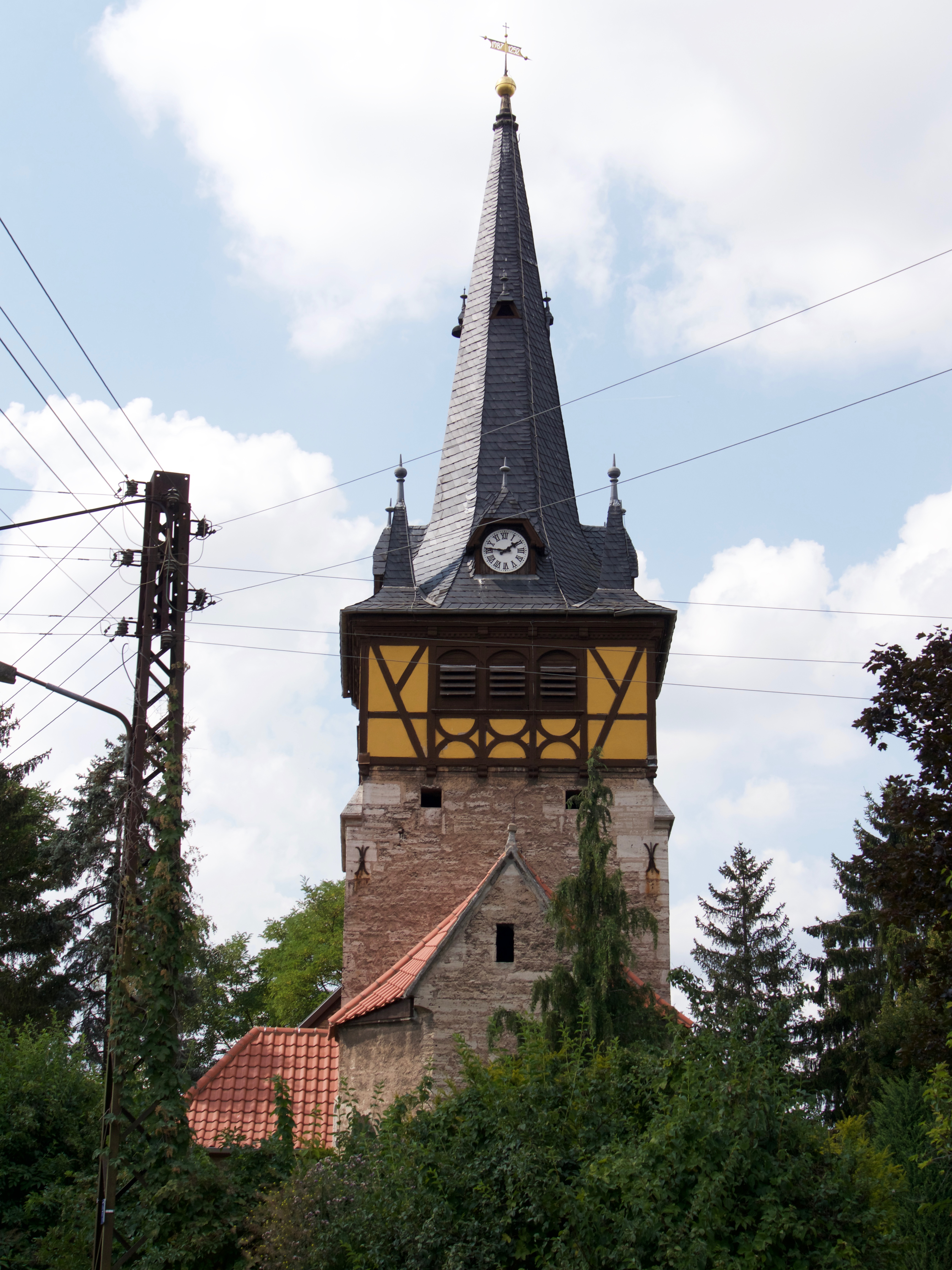
St Martin's Church in Görmar

The village of Görmar was first mentioned in a document on 28 January 897. For the early medieval history of the region, Görmar was important as the central place of the Germar-Mark named after it. Researchers dispute why this larger complex of royal estates in northwestern Thuringia was named after Görmar at the time and not after neighbouring Mühlhausen (for which there is evidence of royal estates itself). This suggests that Görmar may have been an important place in older times, especially as the place name is linguistic-historically much older than the name Mühlhausen, which dates from the Frankish period.

For centuries, Görmar belonged to the sphere of influence of the Reichsstadt (imperial city) of Mühlhausen. In the Peasants' War, on 29 April 1525, the Stadtarmut ("urban poor") of Mühlhausen and the rebellious peasants founded the Vereinigter Mühlhäuser und Thüringer Haufen ("United Mühlhausen and Thuringian Troops") near Görmar, which marched from here into the Frankenhausen rebellion area. In 1565, the population of Goermar (Görmar) was 53.

In 1802, Görmar, together with Mühlhausen, fell to the Kingdom of Prussia, from 1807 to 1813 to the Kingdom of Westphalia (Dachrieden canton) created by Napoleon, and after the Congress of Vienna in 1816, it was assigned to the district of Mühlhausen i. Th. in the Prussian province of Saxony.

On 9 April 1994, Görmar was incorporated into Mühlhausen.

=== Sights ===
- St Martin's Church, Görmar

== Notable people ==
- Johann Lorenz Albrecht (born 8 January 1732 in Görmar; died 29 November 1768 in Mühlhausen), composer
