= German Center for Pediatric and Adolescent Rheumatology =

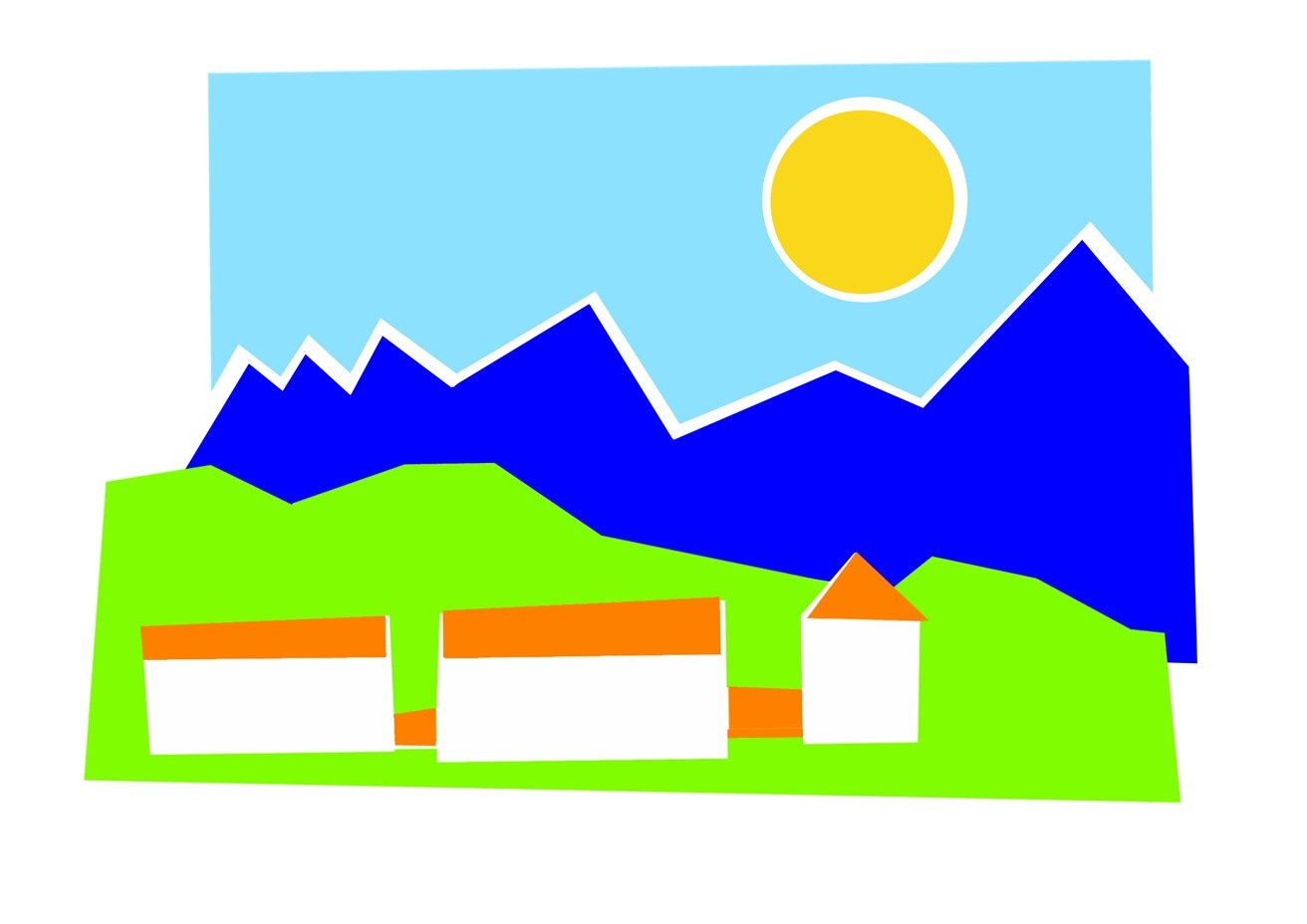

Geography
- Location: Bavaria, DE
- Coordinates: 47°29′16″N 11°06′10″E

Organisation
- Type: Specialist
- Affiliated university: LMU Munich

History
- Founded: 1952

Links
- Website: www.rheuma-kinderklinik.de

The German Center for Pediatric and Adolescent Rheumatology in Garmisch-Partenkirchen (also called the 'Kinderrheumaklinik', i.e. the Pediatric Rheumatology Hospital) is the largest specialized center for the treatment of children and adolescents with rheumatic diseases and chronic pain syndromes in Europe.

== History ==
The Pediatric Rheumatology Hospital evolved out of a pediatric facility for treating tuberculosis. Dr. Elizabeth Stoeber, the first chief of medicine, was able to use funds from the Marshall Plan to convert the facility to a full pediatric hospital. Initially, mainly patients with rheumatic fever were treated. However, by the end of the decade focus shifted towards patients with Still's disease and juvenile idiopathic arthritis.

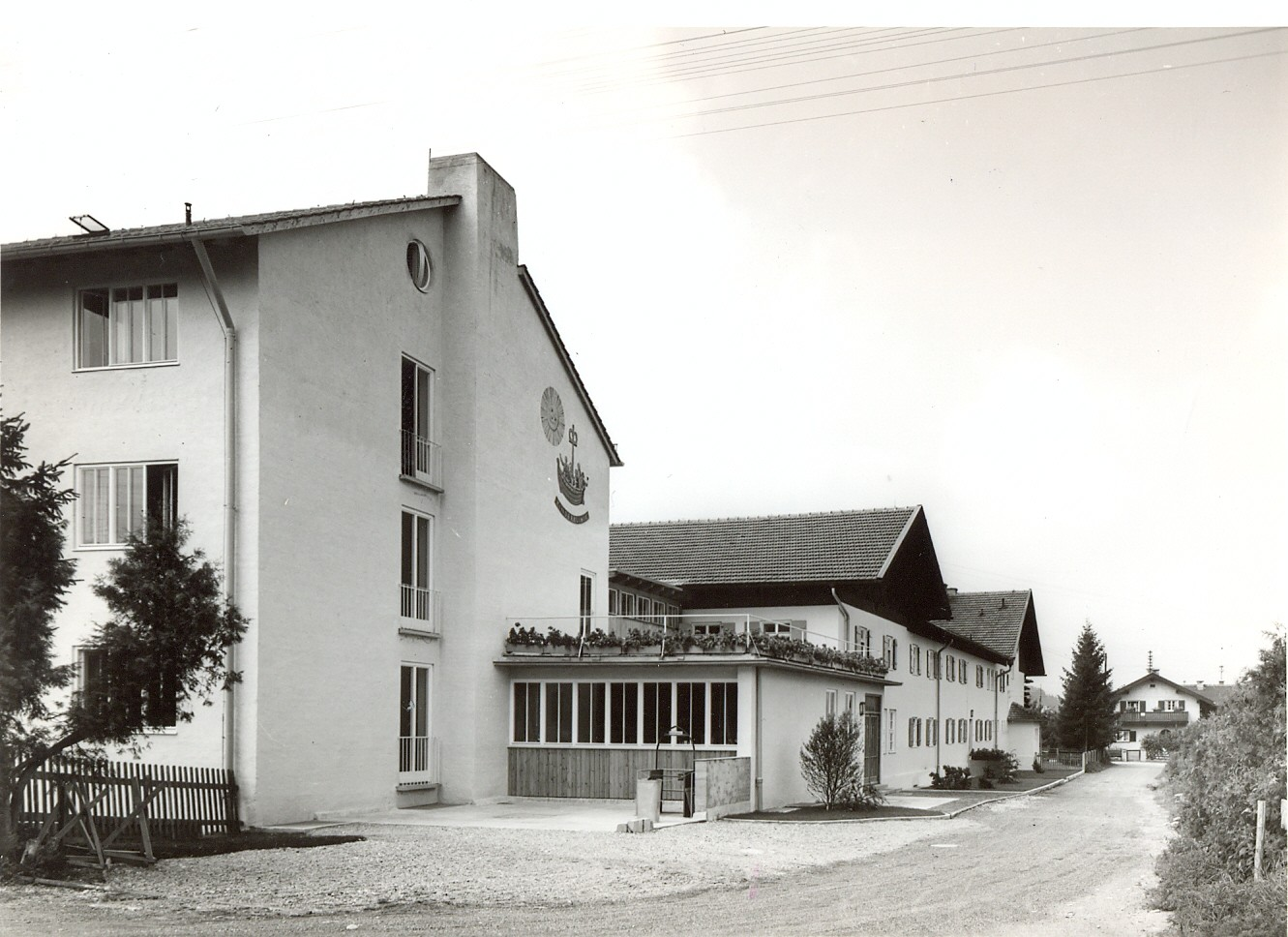
The Pediatric Hospital of the Inner Mission in Garmisch-Partenkirchen with the newly constructed rheumatology wing, approx. 1965

With increasing availability of steroids and non-steroidal antirheumatic drugs as well as the addition of facilities for physiotherapy, the 1960s saw the development of a program for the therapy of the often severely impaired and handicapped children. In addition, hospital schooling starting in 1952 was developed into a full hospital school by 1975. Donation from various sources, especially the German branch of the Lions Club allowed significant expansion of the facilities. By 1971, a new hospital building was inaugurated, including a gymnasium and exercise pool.

The 1980s saw international recognition of pediatric rheumatology as a subspecialty with increasing competition from outpatient clinics in university hospitals. The Pediatric Rheumatology Hospital continued with a focus on clinical work and physiotherapy. Modifications to the building created more space for physiotherapy, occupational therapy and balneotherapy. At the same time, social support was improved by obtaining a house nearby providing lodging and other facilities to families of inpatients.

In 2004, the general hospital wing was moved to the newly constructed Garmisch General Hospital. The Pediatric Rheumatology Hospital, renamed the 'German Center for Pediatric and Adolescent Rheumatology', was now the only facility in Europe exclusively dedicated to treating rheumatic diseases in childhood. Starting in 2002, the hospital building was renovated in several stages. As the Inner Mission sold the hospital in 2010, the Pediatric Rheumatology Hospital was taken over by the chief of medicine, Professor J.-P. Haas with the help of private investors.

== Structure of the Hospital ==
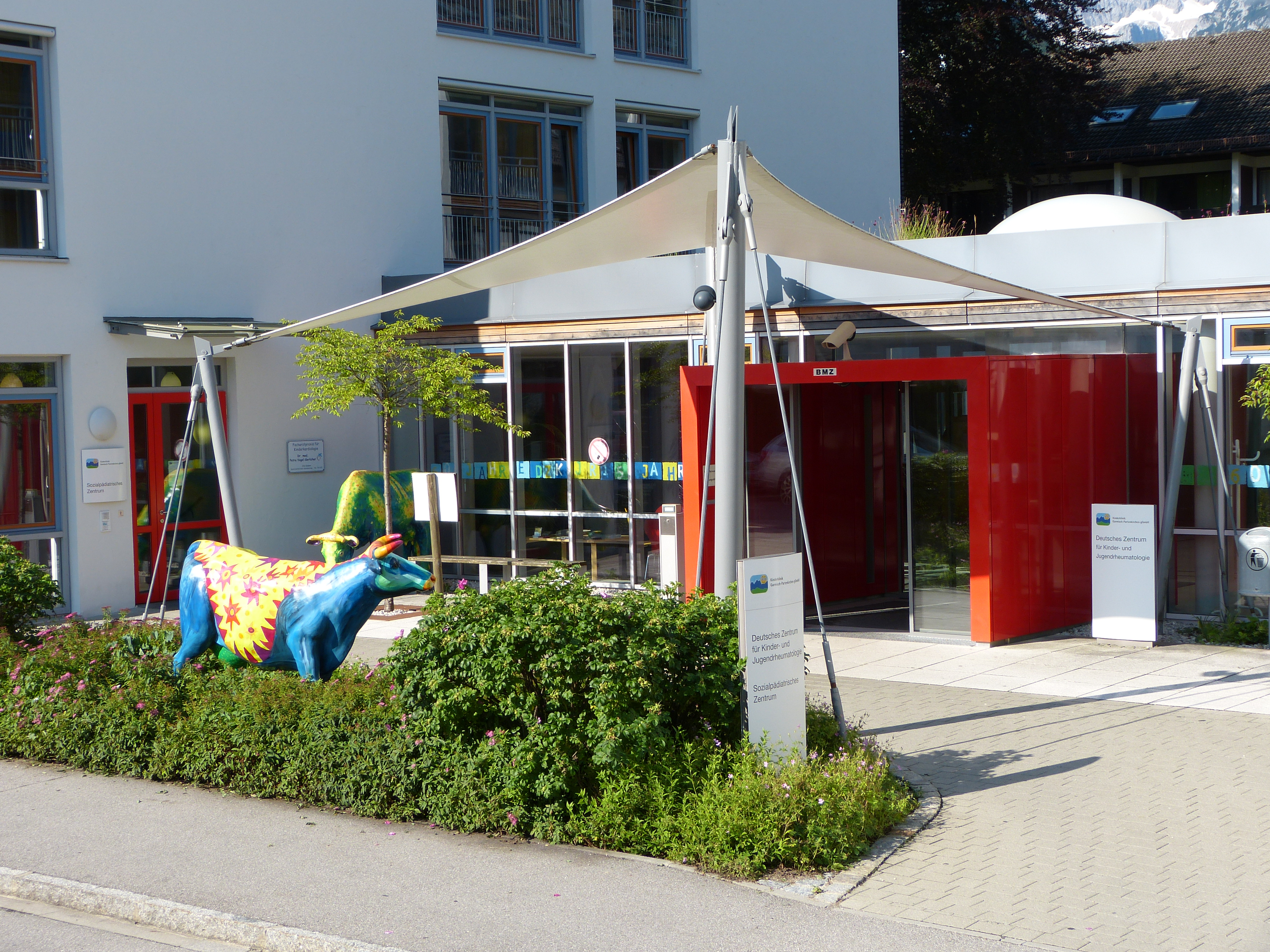
The Center for Pediatric and Adolescent Rheumatology today

The Center for Pediatric and Adolescent Rheumatology treats children and adolescents with rheumatic diseases including juvenile idiopathic arthritis, but also systemic lupus erythematosus, juvenile dermatomyositis, scleroderma and other connective tissue disorders. Patients, originating mostly from Germany, but also a significant number of international patients, are mainly treated as inpatients. A smaller part of patients is also treated on an outpatient basis. Children and adolescents with chronic pain syndromes are treated in a specialized ward setting. Also integrated into the hospital are outpatient facilities for pediatric cardiology and developmentally delayed children.

== The Garmisch Treatment Concept ==
The Pediatric Rheumatology Hospital uses a team-based approach with a multidisciplinary treatment concept. The basis of this concept is to treat the child or adolescent as individual, using five 'columns': medical therapy, nursing therapy, physical therapy, psychosocial and educational therapy and the hospital school. Using these columns, an individual treatment concept is tailored to the needs of the patient during his stay.
