= County of Werdenfels =

Coordinates: 47°31′10″N 11°05′51″E

The County of Werdenfels (German: Grafschaft Werdenfels) in the present-day Werdenfelser Land in South Germany was a county that enjoyed imperial immediacy that belonged to the Bishopric of Freising from the late 13th century until the secularisation of the Bishopric in 1803.

Werdenfels. The county was not contiguous with the Prince-Bishopric of Freising to the north

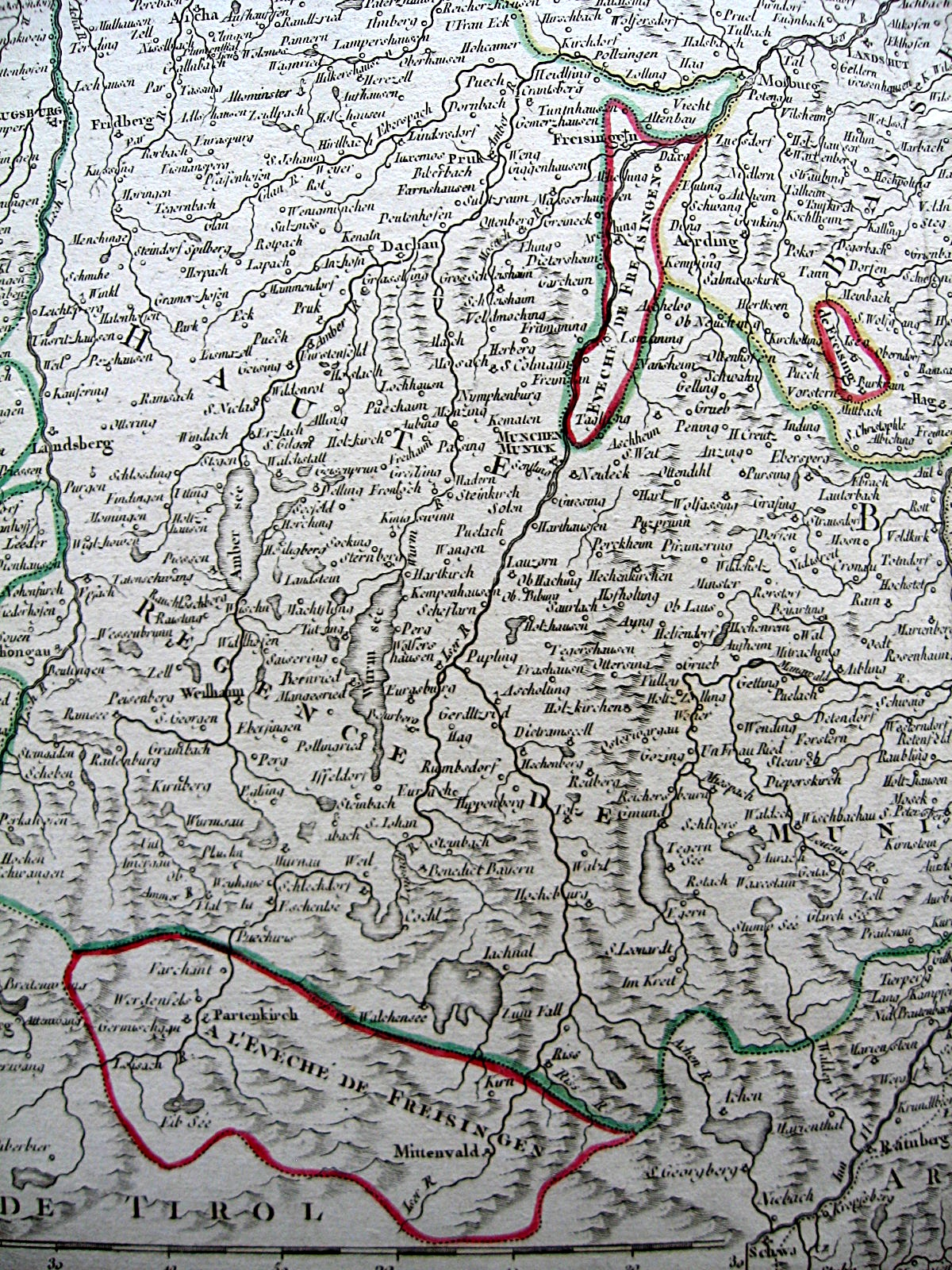
18th-century map showing the County of Werdenfels

The county was administered from Werdenfels Castle. In 1294 Count Perchthold of Eschenloh sold his land to Bishop Emicho of Freising. The county was divided into three administrative areas: Garmisch, Partenkirchen and Mittenwald. The senior judge (Pfleger) had his seat in Garmisch, where he held his hearings (Gerichtstage). Court sessions initially took place at the castle, but in 1632 they were moved to Schwaigwang.

The county had considerable ore and silver deposits. Of even greater economic importance was its control of the trading routes to Italy at the beginning of the Modern Era. Goods that came from the south (spices, fruit, incense, wine) had to be deposited in Mittenwald for a fee while goods coming from the north (copper, brass, cloth, jewellery, metal goods) had likewise to be stored in Partenkirchen for a fee. Only one Werdenfels wagoner guild had the right to transport goods within the county. From 1487 to 1679, the Republic of Venice held its own market in Mittenwald. As a result, the region became quite prosperous and was referred to as the "golden land".

Due to its wealth, the county was coveted by nearby Tyrol and Bavaria and in 1530, Duke William IV of Bavaria offered to the Prince-Bishop to exchange Bavarian territories between the Isar and Amper rivers for Werdenfels but the exchange did not materialize.

After the Thirty Years' War the region gradually lost its importance as a transshipment point. Violin making, founded by Matthias Klotz, brought a certain boom in Mittenwald.

With the secularisation of the Prince-Bishopric of Freising in 1803, Werdenfels went to Bavaria.

== Sources ==
- Albrecht, Dieter: Die Grafschaft Werdenfels. in: Unbekanntes Bayern. Entdeckungen und Wanderungen, München, Süddeutscher Verlag, 1955, ISBN 3-7991-5839-1
- Josef Ostler/Michael Henker/Susanne Bäumler: Grafschaft Werdenfels 1294 - 1802. Katalogbuch zur Ausstellung im Kurhaus Garmisch. Mohr×Löwe×Raute. Beitrage zur Geschichte des Landkreises Garmisch-Partenkirchen Band 2, hrsg. v. Verein für Geschichte, Kunst und Kulturgeschichte im Landkreis e.V., Garmisch-Partenkirchen. 1994.
- Johannes Haslauer: Errichtet um allen Nachbarn Verdruss zu machen. Die Rolle der Bayerischen Akademie der Wissenschaften im politischen Streit um die Grafschaft Werdenfels (1765–1768), in: Zeitschrift für bayerische Landesgeschichte 72 (2009), S. 399–459.
- Prechtl, Johann Baptist: Chronik der ehemals bischöflich freisingischen Grafschaft Werdenfels in Oberbayern mit ihren drei Untergerichten und Pfarreien Garmisch, Partenkirchen und Mittenwald. Zusammengestellt Augsburg 1850. Garmisch, Ostler, 1931
- Wüst, Wolfgang: Umbruch im Goldenen Landl vor 200 Jahren. Der Markt Partenkirchen und die Grafschaft Werdenfels im Säkularisationstrauma, in: Mohr – Löwe – Raute. Beiträge zur Geschichte des Landkreises Garmisch-Partenkirchen 11, hrsg. v. Verein für Geschichte, Kunst und Kulturgeschichte im Landkreis e.V., Garmisch-Partenkirchen 2006, S. 141–162.
