= Garmisch-Partenkirchen =

- Municipality
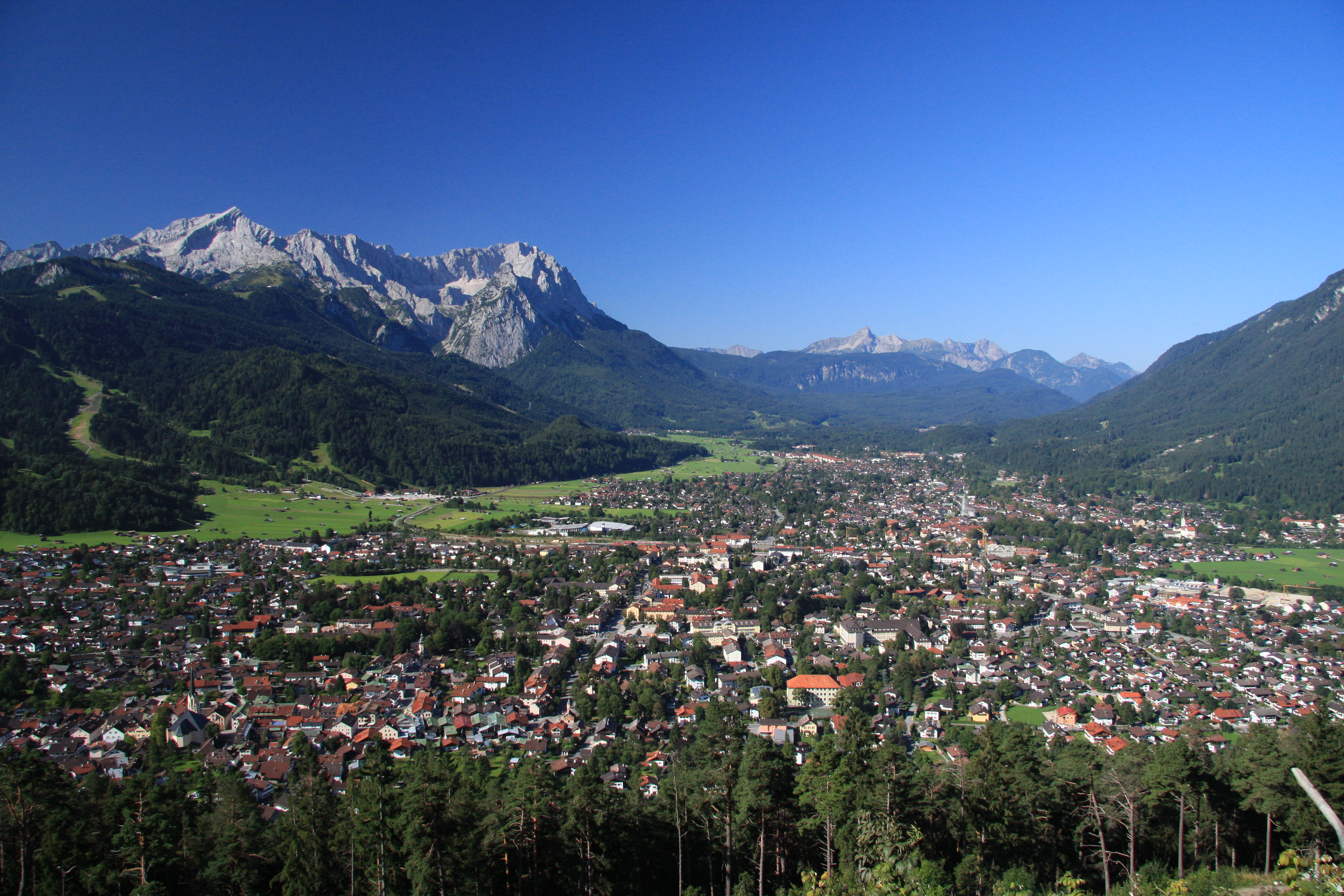
- Garmisch-Partenkirchen in September 2009, Alpspitze and Zugspitze in background left

- Coat of arms

- Location of Garmisch-Partenkirchen within Garmisch-Partenkirchen district
- Interactive map of Garmisch-Partenkirchen
- Location within Germany Location within Bavaria
- Coordinates: 47°30′N 11°5′E
- Country: Germany
- State: Bavaria
- Admin. region: Oberbayern
- District: Garmisch-Partenkirchen

Government
  - Mayor (2020–26): Elisabeth Koch (CSU)

Area
  - Total: 205.66 km^{2} (79.41 sq mi)
- Elevation: 708 m (2,323 ft)

Population (2025-12-31)
  - Total: 28,088
  - Density: 136.57/km^{2} (353.73/sq mi)
- Time zone: UTC+01:00 (CET)
  - Summer (DST): UTC+02:00 (CEST)
- Postal codes: 82467
- Dialling codes: 08821
- Vehicle registration: GAP
- Website: www.gapa.de

Garmisch-Partenkirchen (German pronunciation: [ˈɡaʁmɪʃ paʁtn̩ˈkɪʁçn̩]; Bavarian: Garmasch-Partakurch) is an Alpine ski town in Bavaria, southern Germany. It is the seat of government of the district of Garmisch-Partenkirchen (abbreviated GAP), in the Oberbayern region, which borders Austria. Nearby is Germany's highest mountain, Zugspitze, at 2,962 metres (9,718 ft) above sea level.

The town is known as the site of the 1936 Winter Olympic Games, the first to include alpine skiing, and hosts a variety of winter sports competitions.

== History ==
Garmisch (in the west) and Partenkirchen (in the east) were separate towns for many centuries, and still maintain quite separate identities.

Partenkirchen originated as the Roman town of Partanum on the trade route from Venice to Augsburg and is first mentioned in the year A.D. 15. Its main street, Ludwigsstrasse, follows the original Roman road. Garmisch was first mentioned some 800 years later as Germareskauue, meaning "Germar's gau".

During the late 13th century, the valley, as part of the County of Werdenfels, came under the rule of the prince-bishops of Freising and was to remain so until the mediatization of 1803. The area was governed by a prince-bishop's representative known as a Pfleger (caretaker or warden) from Werdenfels Castle situated on a crag north of Garmisch.

The Europeans' arrival to America at the turn of the 16th century led to a boom in shipping and a sharp decline in overland trade, which plunged the region into a centuries-long economic depression. The valley floor was swampy and difficult to farm. Bears, wolves and lynxes were a constant threat to livestock. The population suffered from periodic epidemics, including several serious outbreaks of bubonic plague. Adverse fortunes from disease and crop failure occasionally led to a witch hunt. Most notable of these were the trials and executions of 1589–1596, in which 63 people—more than 10 per cent of the population at the time—were burned at the stake or garroted.

Werdenfels Castle, where the accused were held, tried and executed, became an object of superstitious terror and was abandoned in the 17th century. It was largely torn down in the 1750s and its stones were used to build the baroque Neue Kirche (New Church) on Marienplatz, which was completed in 1752. It replaced the nearby Gothic Alte Kirche (Old Church), parts of which predated Christianity and might have originally been a pagan temple. Used as a storehouse, armory and haybarn for many years, it has since been re-consecrated. Some of its medieval frescoes are still visible.

Garmisch and Partenkirchen remained separate until their respective mayors were forced by Adolf Hitler to combine the two market towns on 1 January 1935 in anticipation of the 1936 Winter Olympic Games. Today, the united town is casually (but incorrectly) referred to as Garmisch, much to the dismay of Partenkirchen's residents. Most visitors will notice the slightly more modern feel of Garmisch while the fresco-filled, cobblestoned streets of Partenkirchen have a generally more historic appearance. Early mornings and late afternoons in pleasant weather often find local traffic stopped while the dairy cows are herded to and from the nearby mountain meadows.

During World War II, Garmisch-Partenkirchen was a major hospital centre for the German military. On 29 April 1945, Garmisch-Partenkirchen, which had remained undestroyed, was handed over to the US Army without a fight.

== Geography ==
=== Climate ===
Garmisch-Partenkirchen leans towards an oceanic climate, and its winters are colder than the rest of Bavaria. Due to its higher elevation, it is very close to the winters associated with continental climates; it has a relatively wet and snowy climate, with high precipitation year-round. As of 2013, the regions in the west and east of the town were cited as having the highest numbers of thunderstorm days in Europe.

Climate data for Garmisch-Partenkirchen (1991–2020 normals, extremes 1936–present)
| Month | Jan | Feb | Mar | Apr | May | Jun | Jul | Aug | Sep | Oct | Nov | Dec | Year |
|---|---|---|---|---|---|---|---|---|---|---|---|---|---|
| Record high °C (°F) | 19.0 (66.2) | 21.4 (70.5) | 25.3 (77.5) | 29.2 (84.6) | 31.7 (89.1) | 35.1 (95.2) | 36.4 (97.5) | 35.7 (96.3) | 32.0 (89.6) | 27.8 (82.0) | 23.7 (74.7) | 18.6 (65.5) | 36.4 (97.5) |
| Mean daily maximum °C (°F) | 3.2 (37.8) | 5.7 (42.3) | 10.0 (50.0) | 14.5 (58.1) | 18.4 (65.1) | 21.5 (70.7) | 23.4 (74.1) | 23.1 (73.6) | 18.7 (65.7) | 14.5 (58.1) | 8.2 (46.8) | 3.3 (37.9) | 13.7 (56.7) |
| Daily mean °C (°F) | −2.1 (28.2) | −0.5 (31.1) | 3.5 (38.3) | 7.8 (46.0) | 12.1 (53.8) | 15.5 (59.9) | 17.1 (62.8) | 16.6 (61.9) | 12.5 (54.5) | 8.2 (46.8) | 2.7 (36.9) | −1.4 (29.5) | 7.7 (45.9) |
| Mean daily minimum °C (°F) | −5.8 (21.6) | −5.0 (23.0) | −1.7 (28.9) | 1.7 (35.1) | 5.9 (42.6) | 9.6 (49.3) | 11.2 (52.2) | 11.1 (52.0) | 7.5 (45.5) | 3.6 (38.5) | −1.1 (30.0) | −4.6 (23.7) | 2.8 (37.0) |
| Record low °C (°F) | −25.8 (−14.4) | −29.3 (−20.7) | −21.2 (−6.2) | −12.6 (9.3) | −4.6 (23.7) | −0.2 (31.6) | 3.5 (38.3) | 1.8 (35.2) | −2.3 (27.9) | −8.2 (17.2) | −17.3 (0.9) | −24.4 (−11.9) | −29.3 (−20.7) |
| Average precipitation mm (inches) | 77.3 (3.04) | 65.5 (2.58) | 90.3 (3.56) | 87.2 (3.43) | 143.4 (5.65) | 179.7 (7.07) | 172.6 (6.80) | 191.9 (7.56) | 115.4 (4.54) | 91.0 (3.58) | 80.8 (3.18) | 77.8 (3.06) | 1,379.3 (54.30) |
| Average precipitation days (≥ 1.0 mm) | 14.6 | 13.6 | 15.9 | 15.5 | 18.6 | 19.8 | 19.0 | 18.0 | 16.2 | 13.9 | 14.0 | 15.4 | 195.4 |
| Average snowy days (≥ 1.0 cm) | 27.4 | 23.6 | 14.9 | 2.5 | 0.2 | 0 | 0 | 0 | 0 | 0.8 | 8.9 | 21.1 | 99.4 |
| Average relative humidity (%) | 86.2 | 80.9 | 76.2 | 72.2 | 74.1 | 75.8 | 76.4 | 79.3 | 82.6 | 83.5 | 87.0 | 89.3 | 80.3 |
| Mean monthly sunshine hours | 74.6 | 106.1 | 148.6 | 168.8 | 172.1 | 176.2 | 201.1 | 199.5 | 163.7 | 135.3 | 80.2 | 55.7 | 1,665.9 |
Source 1: World Meteorological Organization
Source 2: DWD (extremes)

== Transport ==
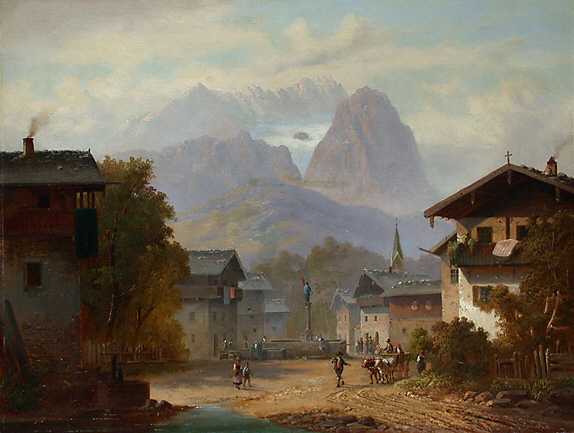
Garmisch-Partenkirchen, painting by Anton Doll

The town is served by the B 2 as a continuation of the A 95 motorway, which ends at Eschenlohe 16 km north of the town.

Garmisch-Partenkirchen station is on the Munich–Garmisch-Partenkirchen line and the Mittenwald Railway (Garmisch–Mittenwald–Innsbruck). Regional services run every hour to Munich Central Station (München Hauptbahnhof) and Mittenwald and every two hours to Innsbruck Central Station (Innsbruck Hauptbahnhof) and Reutte. In addition, there are special seasonal long-distance services, including ICEs, to Berlin, Hamburg, Dortmund, Bremen and Innsbruck.

It is the terminus of the Außerfern Railway to Reutte in Tirol / Kempten im Allgäu and the Bavarian Zugspitze Railway (with sections of rack railway) to the Zugspitze, the highest mountain in Germany.

There are several accessible high and low-level hiking trails from the town that have especially good views.

The nearest airports to the town is Innsbruck Airport which is an hour drive and Munich Airport which is also an hour and half drive from Garmisch-Partenkirchen.

== Sports ==
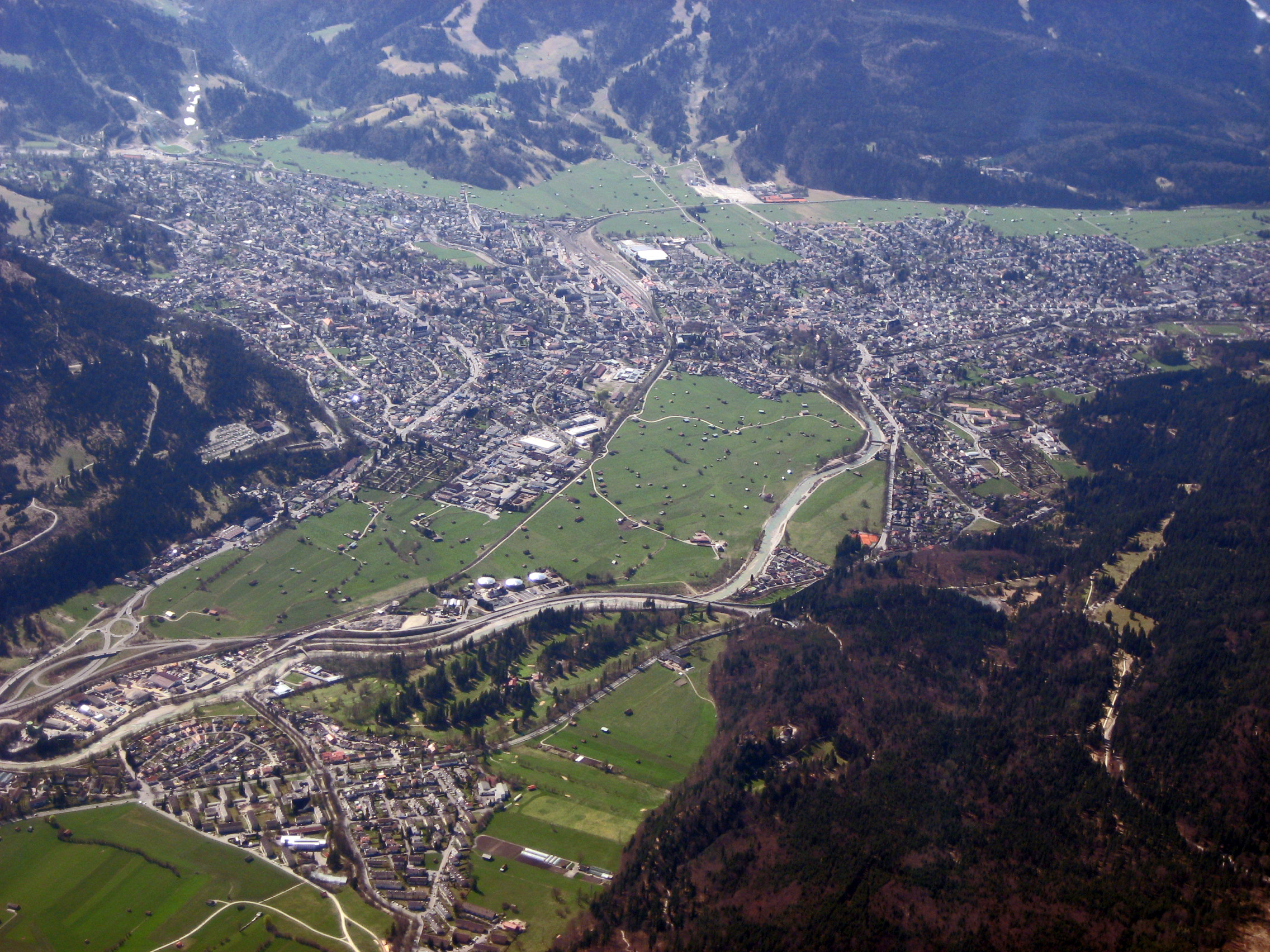
Aerial view of Garmisch-Partenkirchen

Garmisch-Partenkirchen is a favoured holiday spot for skiing, snowboarding, and hiking, having some of the best skiing areas (Garmisch Classic and Zugspitze) in Germany.

It was the site of the 1936 Winter Olympics, the first to feature alpine skiing. It later replaced Sapporo, Japan as the host of the 1940 Winter Olympics, which was cancelled due to World War II. Including the two cancelled cities in 1940, it is the only host city chosen during the World Wars that did not host a subsequent Olympics.

A variety of Nordic and alpine World Cup ski races are held here, usually on the Kandahar Track outside town. Traditionally, a ski jumping contest is held in Garmisch-Partenkirchen on New Year's Day, as a part of the Four Hills Tournament (Vierschanzen-Tournee). The World Alpine Ski Championships were held in Garmisch in 1978 and 2011.

Garmisch-Partenkirchen was a partner in the city of Munich's bid for the 2018 Winter Olympics but the IOC vote held on 6 July 2011 awarded the Games to Pyeongchang. The Winter Olympics were last held in the German-speaking Alps in 1976 in nearby Innsbruck, Austria.

In team sports, the professional former 10-time German champion ice hockey team SC Riessersee play at the Garmisch Olympia Stadium.

The local association football team is 1.FC Garmisch-Partenkirchen.

== Event highlights ==
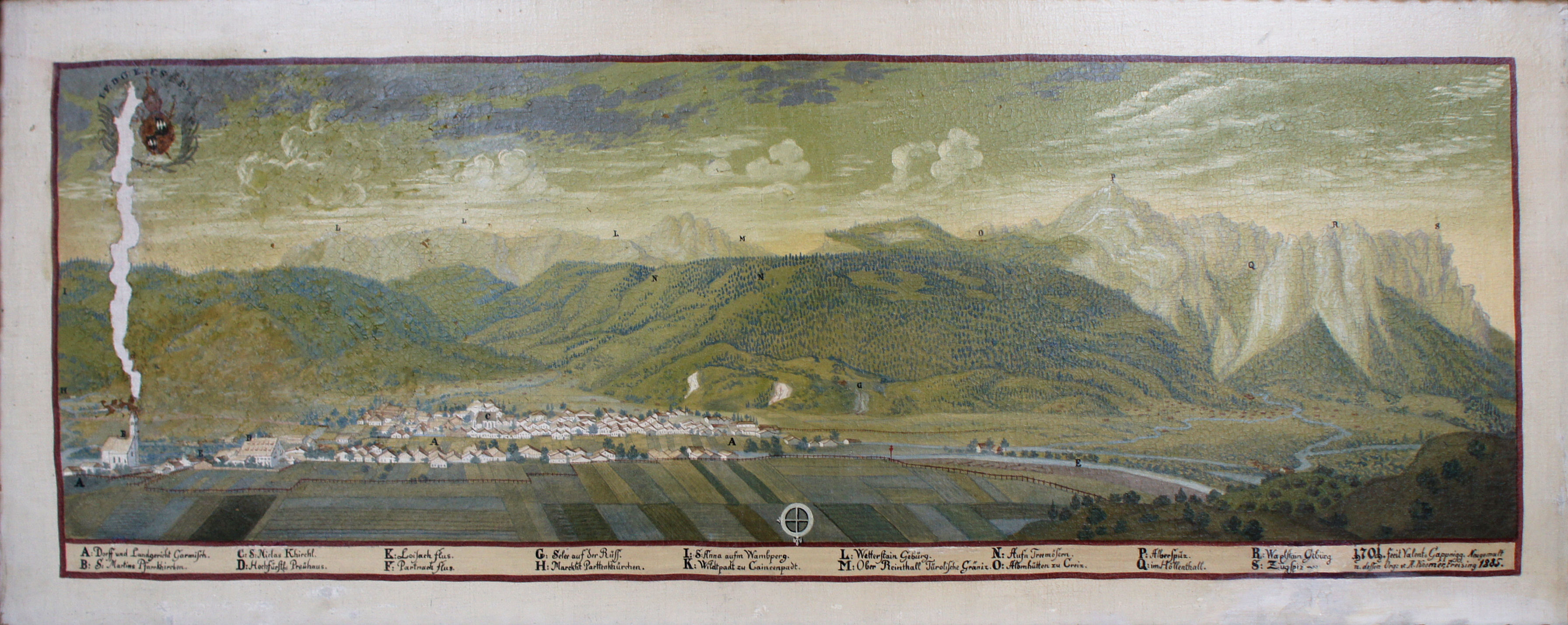
Panorama of Garmisch by Valentin Gappnigg (c. 1700)

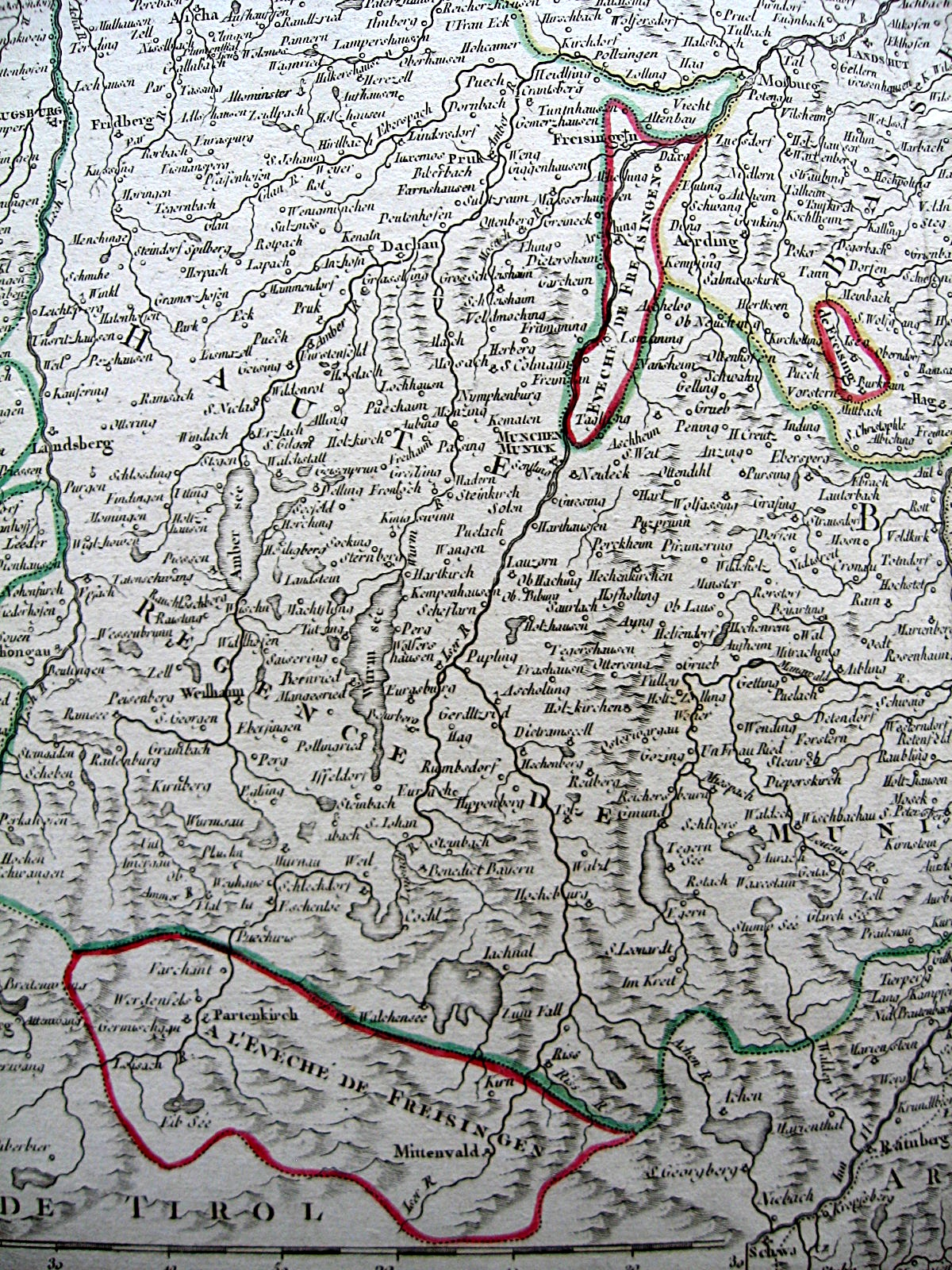
18th-century map showing the County of Werdenfels with Garmisch and Partenkirchen

- January – New Year's Ski Jump
  - 6 January – "Hornschlittenrennen"
- January / February – FIS Alpine Ski World Cup
- February – Historic bob-race on the olympic track at Riessersee
- 30.04. – "Georgimarkt" Partenkirchen
- May–October – "Musik im Park"
- June – Zugspitz Ultratrail trail running around the Zugspitze.
  - Richard-Strauss-Festival
- July The first weekend– BMW Motorbike Days
  - 15.07. - White night
- July / August "Festwoche" Festival in Garmisch and Partenkirchen
- August – "Alpentestival"
- August/September – Straßen.Kunst.Festival (Streetart-Festival)
- November– "Martinimarkt" Garmisch

== Public institutions ==
The George C. Marshall European Center for Security Studies is also located in Garmisch-Partenkirchen. The Marshall Center is an internationally funded and mostly U.S.-staffed learning and conference centre for governments from around the world, but primarily from the former Soviet Union and Eastern European countries. It was established in June 1993, replacing the U.S. Army Russian Institute. Near the Marshall Center is the American Armed Forces Recreation Centers (Edelweiss Lodge and Resort) in Garmisch that serves U.S. and NATO military and their families. A number of U.S. troops and civilians are stationed in the town to provide logistical support to the Marshall Center and Edelweiss Recreation Center. The German Centre for Pediatric and Adolescent Rheumatology, the largest specialized centre for the treatment of children and adolescents with rheumatic diseases in Europe, has been active in Garmisch-Partenkirchen since 1952.

== Twin towns – sister cities ==
Garmisch-Partenkirchen is twinned with:

- Aspen, United States
- Chamonix-Mont-Blanc, France
- Lahti, Finland

== Notable people ==
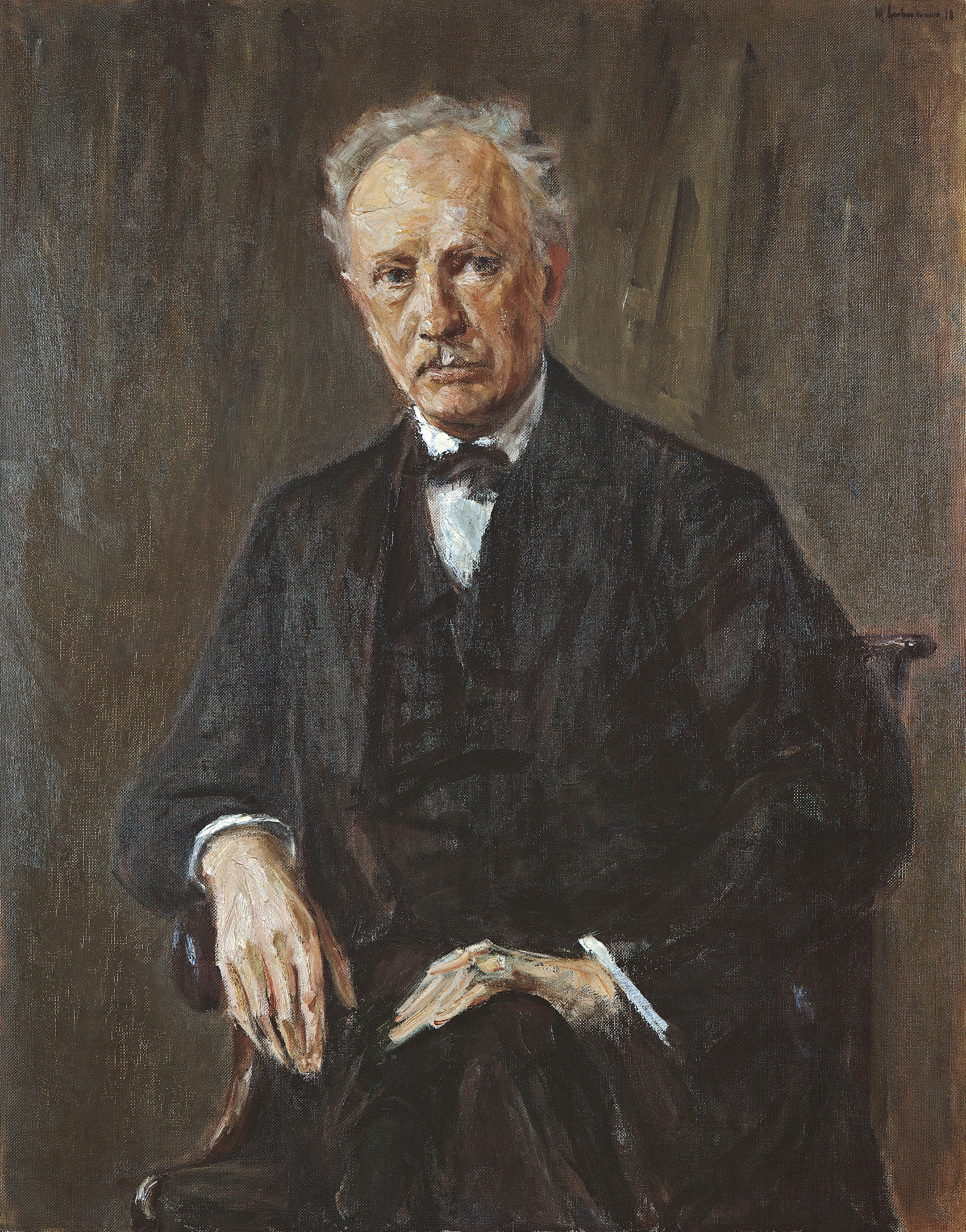
Portrait of Richard Strauss, 1918

- Hans Peter Blochwitz (born 1949), lyric tenor, sings parts in Mozart operas
- Marina Anna Eich (born 1976), film actress and producer
- Michael Ende (1929–1995), writer of fantasy and children's fiction, best known for The Neverending Story
- Alfred Gerstenberg (1893–1959), Luftwaffe general
- Franz Klarwein (1914–1991), operatic tenor, husband of Sári Barabás
- Hermann Levi (1839–1900), Jewish orchestral conductor
- Ulla Mitzdorf (1944–2013), scientist, substantially contributed to diverse areas including physics, chemistry, psychology, physiology, medicine and gender studies
- Christoph Hermann Probst (1918–1943), student of medicine and member of the White Rose (Weiße Rose) resistance group
- Robert Rosner (born 1947), astrophysicist and founding director of the Energy Policy Institute at the University of Chicago
- Wolfgang Seiler (born 1940), biogeochemist and climatologist; after he retired, he was environmental officer (voluntary) for the town
- Hank Smith (1934–2002), Canadian country music singer
- Michaela Steiger (born 1964), actress for theatre, film, television
- Richard Strauss (1864–1949), leading German composer of the late Romantic and early modern eras.
- Ludwig Thoma (1867–1921), author, publisher and editor, who gained popularity through his partially exaggerated description of everyday Bavarian life

=== Notable people in sports ===
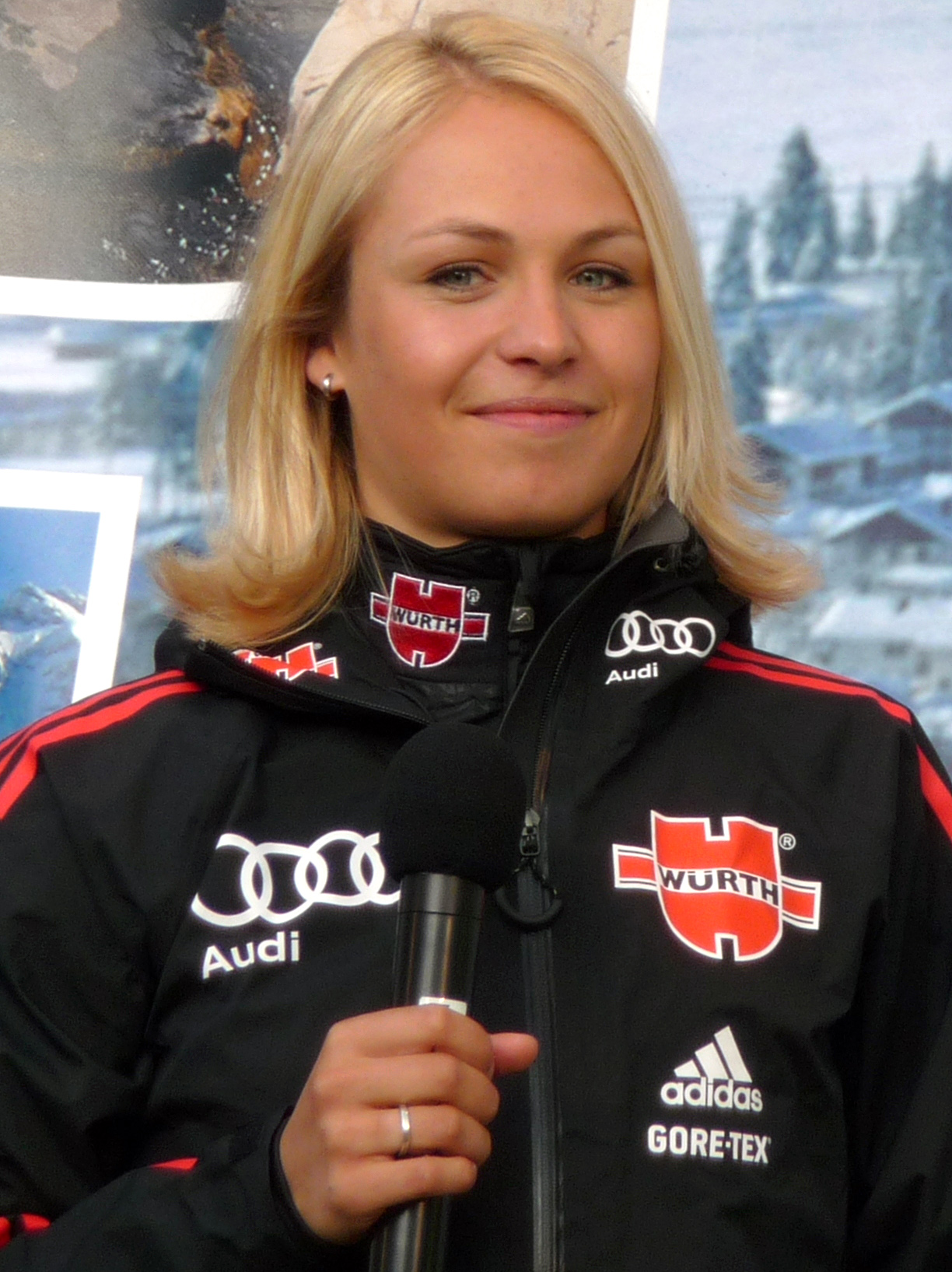
Magdalena Neuner, 2011

- Pepi Bader (1941–2021), bobsledder
- Martina Beck (née Glagow) (born 1979), biathlete
- Armin Bittner (born 1964), alpine skier
- Laura Dahlmeier (1993–2025), biathlete, double Olympic gold medalist
- Stefan Gaisreiter (born 1947), bobsledder
- Miriam Gössner (born 1990), biathlete
- Käthe Grasegger (1917–2001), alpine skier
- Maria Höfl-Riesch (born 1984), alpine skier
- Reinhard E. Ketterer (born 1948), figure skater
- Hanns Kilian (1905–1981), bobsledder
- Rosi Mittermaier (1950–2023), alpine ski racer, double Olympic gold medalist
- Magdalena Neuner (born 1987), six-time biathlon world champion, Olympic champion, Biathlon World Cup winner
- Christian Neureuther (born 1949), alpine ski racer
- Felix Neureuther (born 1984), alpine skier
- Michael Pössinger (1919–2003), bobsledder
- Susanne Riesch (born 1987), alpine skier
- Thaddäus Robl (1877–1910), cyclist
- Andrea Schöpp (born 1965), curler
- Hans-Joachim Stuck (born 1951), racing driver
- Monika Wagner (born 1965), curler
- Matthias Wörndle (1909–1942), cross-country skier
- Roman Wörndle (1913–1942), alpine skier

== Points of interest ==
South of Partenkirchen is the Partnach Gorge, where the Partnach river surges spectacularly through a narrow, 2-kilometre-long (1 mi) gap between high limestone cliffs. The Zugspitze (local name "Zugspitz") is south of Garmisch near the village of Grainau. The highest mountain in Germany, it actually straddles the border with Austria. Also overlooking Garmisch-Partenkirchen is Germany's fourth-highest mountain, the Leutasch Dreitorspitze ("Three-Gate Peak", a name derived from its triple summit).

The King's House on Schachen, a small castle built for Ludwig II of Bavaria, is also located in the mountains south of Garmisch-Partenkirchen. Its grounds contain the Alpengarten auf dem Schachen, an alpine botanical garden.
