= Michaela Steiger =

German actress

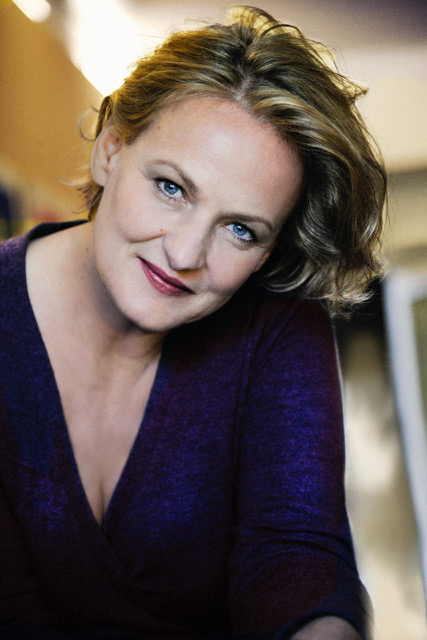
- Born: 1964 (age 61–62); Garmisch-Partenkirchen, West Germany
- Occupation: Actor
- Years active: 1988–present

Michaela Steiger (born 1964) is a German actress in theatre, film and television. Steiger was born in Garmisch-Partenkirchen and completed her acting training in New York with Susan Batson (Actors Studio) and Herbert Berghof. Her first permanent engagement was in Theater Basel where she worked under the direction of Frank Baumbauer with the directors Jossi Wieler (Schiller's Don Carlos), Andreas Kriegenburg, Frank Castorf (Sophokles’ Aias) and Barbara Frey (after Sylvia Plath Ich kann es besonders schön). Then she moved to the Düsseldorfer Schauspielhaus from 1993 to 1996. She became a member of the ensemble of the Schaubühne in Berlin under director Thomas Ostermeier. Steiger had numerous guest engagements at the Hamburger Schauspielhaus, Schauspiel Frankfurt, Maxim Gorki Theater Berlin, Schauspielhaus Zürich and the Munich Kammerspiele (Christine in "Mourning must carry Elektra", directed by Stefan Pucher, Ms. Prantl in "Faith, Love, Hope", directed by Stephan Kimmig). From 2011 to 2016 she was a member of the ensemble at the Residenztheater in Munich, where she worked with directors Martin Kušej, Katrine Wiedemann, Daniela Löffner and Bernhard Mikeska, among others. She has been associated with the Düsseldorfer Schauspielhaus since the 2016/17 season. She is also involved in various film and television productions.

== Theatre ==
Düsseldorfer Schauspielhaus (seit 2016)

- Gilgamesh, director: Roger Vontobel
- Fabian, director: Bernadette Sonnenbichler
- Medea, director: Roger Vontobel
- Der zerbrochene Krug, director: Laura Linnenbaum

Münchner Kammerspiele (2018–2019)

- What they want to hear, director: Lola Arias

== Film ==
- Weil ich schöner bin (director: Frieder Schlaich, 2012)
- Revolution Now! (director: Nuran David Calis, 2013)
