= Werdenfels Castle =

- Garmisch-Partenkirchen-Burgrain
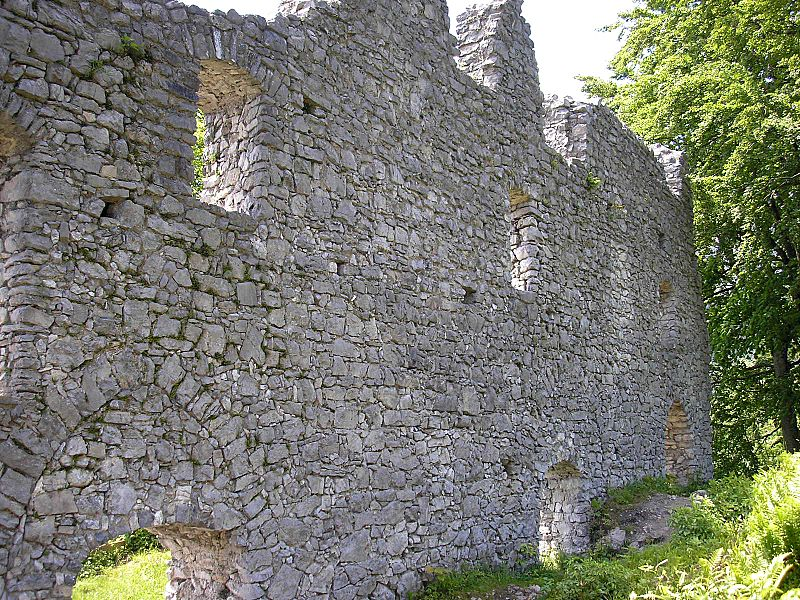
- The north side of the palas

Site information
- Type: hill castle, spur castle
- Code: DE-BY
- Condition: ruin

Location
- Location within Bavaria Location within Germany
- Coordinates: 47°30′59″N 11°05′31″E
- Height: 795 m above sea level (NN)

Site history
- Built: around 1230
- Materials: natural stone construction from limestone

Garrison information
- Occupants: administrative centre of the County of Werdenfels

The ruins of Werdenfels Castle (German: Burg Werdenfels) stand about 80 metres above the Loisach valley between Garmisch and Farchant in the county of Garmisch-Partenkirchen in Upper Bavaria. The spur castle was used until 1632 as the administrative centre of the County of Werdenfels, but began to fall into disrepair thereafter.

The castle ruins are freely accessible and are a popular hiking destination with a good view of Garmisch-Partenkirchen and the Wetterstein Mountains.

== Location ==
The castle is located at an elevation of 795 m above sea level (NN) northwest of Garmisch-Partenkirchen on an eastern spur of the Kramerspitz in the Ammergau Alps. It stands about 80 metres above the valley floor and is easy to reach on well-signposted paths. The rocky terrain falls steeply from northwest to southeast into the valley, whilst southwest of the castle the land climbs rapidly. This typical castle situation enabled long-distance surveillance of the important trading route in the valley, but it was not possible to protect it directly as the castle was just too far away.

== History ==
The foundation date of the castle has been hotly disputed in castle research circles. However, it was probably built between 1180 and 1230. Its owner and the purpose of the original fortification are also unknown.

In 1249, ownership of the fortress was transferred to the Prince-Bishopric of Freising and it was occupied with guardians (Burghütern) or governors (Pfleger). In 1294 Count Berthold III of Eschenlohe gave the Bishopric part of his county and was appointed as the castle guardian. After the creation of Freising territory, the County of Werdenfels, the castle served as the administrative and juridical centre. However, not all governors took up residence in the castle. The county was generally regarded as "the best part of the Imperial Principality of Freising" (Carolus Meichelbeck). It supplied "chamois and red deer venison and game... wood, marble" that could be transported on the rivers Isar and Loisach directly to the cathedral town.

In the 15th century, Freising had to enfeoff the castle several times due to financial difficulties. The structural condition of the castle seems to have deteriorated to the beginning of the 17th century such that the governor's seat was moved in 1632 into a new administrative building on the Wang. From 1676 the fortress was exploited as a quarry. For example, numerous stone blocks from castle were re-used for the new baroque parish churches of Farchant and Garmisch.

As part of the seizure of church land in the Napoleonic era, the castle and county went to the Kingdom of Bavaria. Its population of roughly 5,000 which had hitherto enjoyed imperial immediacy found it difficult at first to get used to their new masters. An 1806 document by a Munich official complains that "many Werdenfelßer still have no Bavarian heart!"

In 1822 the Bavarian privy council, Ignaz von Rudhart, acquired the ruins, since when it has been privately owned.

In 1905-06, the walls were secured and partially rebuilt. After the tops of the walls were secured in 1961/63, further restoration finally began in 1986; this has continued sporadically since.

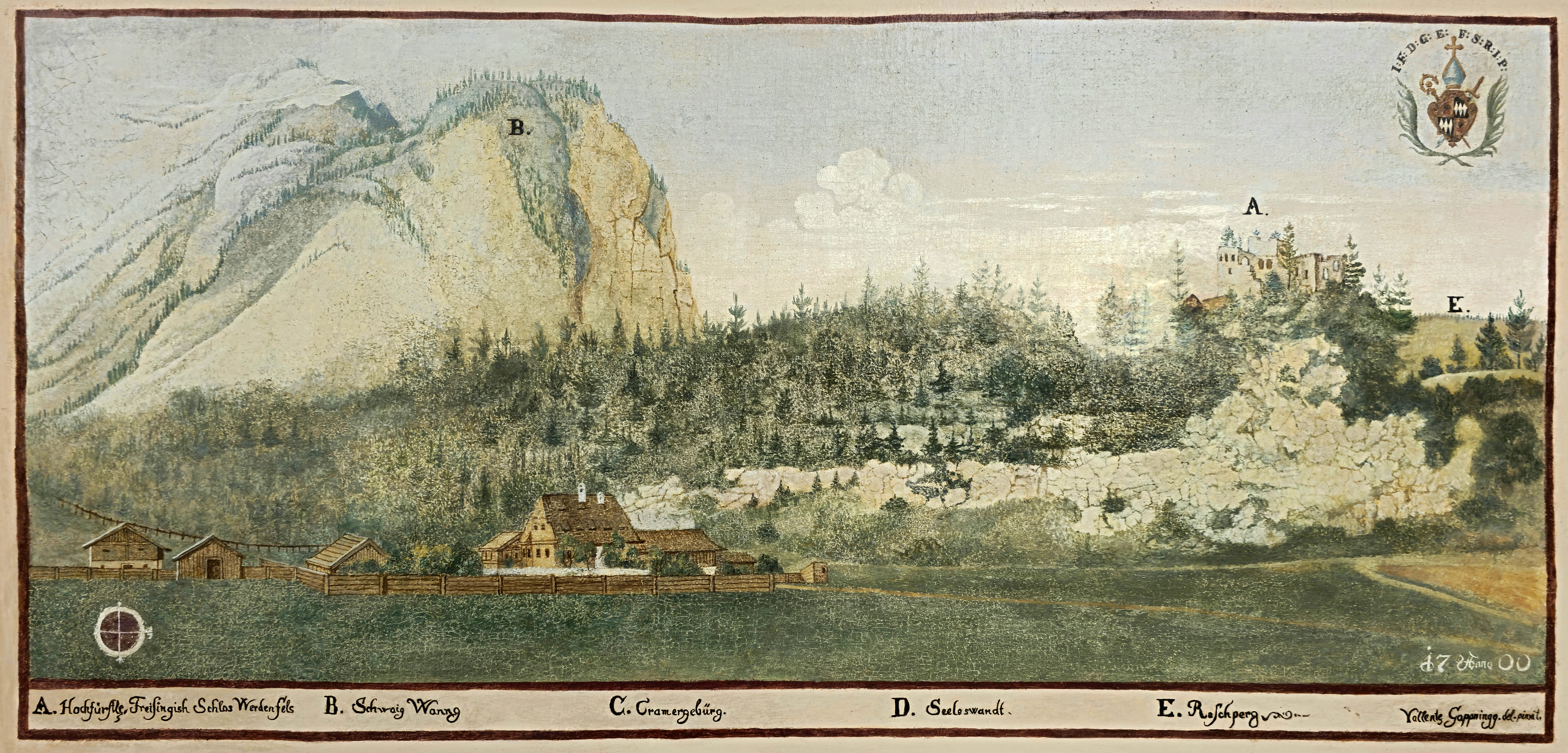
Werdenfels Castle and Schwaigwang in 1700

== Description ==
The construction material for the castle was the local limestone, which was quarried in the Schlosswald ("Castle Wood") above the fortification. Of interest here are the remains of six ring-shaped lime kilns which were archaeologically investigated in 1997.

To the south and west a shallow neck ditch guards the position. The approximately square, elevated inner ward (27.6 × 24.8 metres) has two outer wards to the north and west dating to the 14th and 15th centuries.

The bergfried rose at or over the northwestern corner of the inner ward, but was completely demolished around 1728/30 leaving a pile of rubble today. The tower was also used in the 15th and 16th centuries as a gaol. Better preserved are the north side and an internal wall of the palas (24.8 × 11.4 metres) and the stonework of the two outer wards with its – largely renovated – 'Mittertor ("Central Gate").

The partially preserved north wall of the palas is pierced on the ground floor by three large pointed arches whose actual function remains a puzzle.

In its last phase of expansion, the castle was probably more of an administrative seat than a fortification and would not have withstood a serious siege for very long. The wall thicknesses only average about 90 centimetres and the main direction of attack was not reinforced or protected by flanking towers. The most defensible part of the castle was the high medieval bergfried of which little is known apart from a few 17th and 18th century illustrations.

Werdenfels Castle's weaknesses as a fortification had been noted by castle researcher, Otto Piper. He recognised that the fortress "so far as the remaining walls are concerned, conspicuously lacks the positions and facilities for a sustained defence“. As a result of his research he finally came to the conclusion that the ruins "no longer correspond to the older castle".

The associated domestic yard lay to the south, below the castle in the valley roughly where the old district office (Amtshaus) is today (Schwaige Wang).

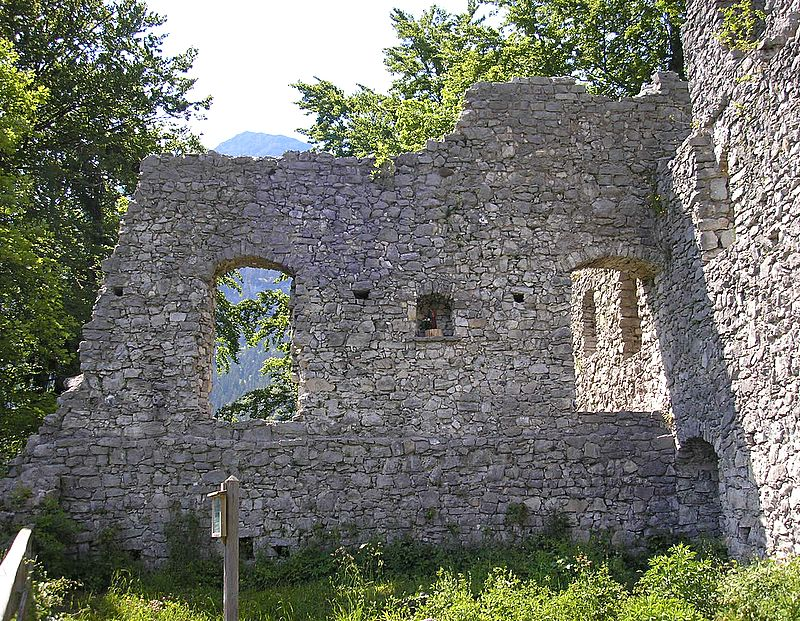
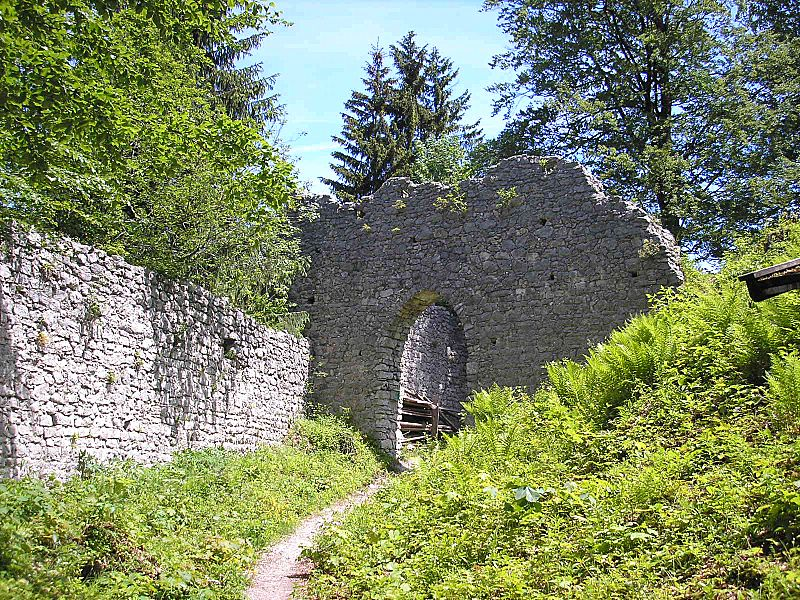
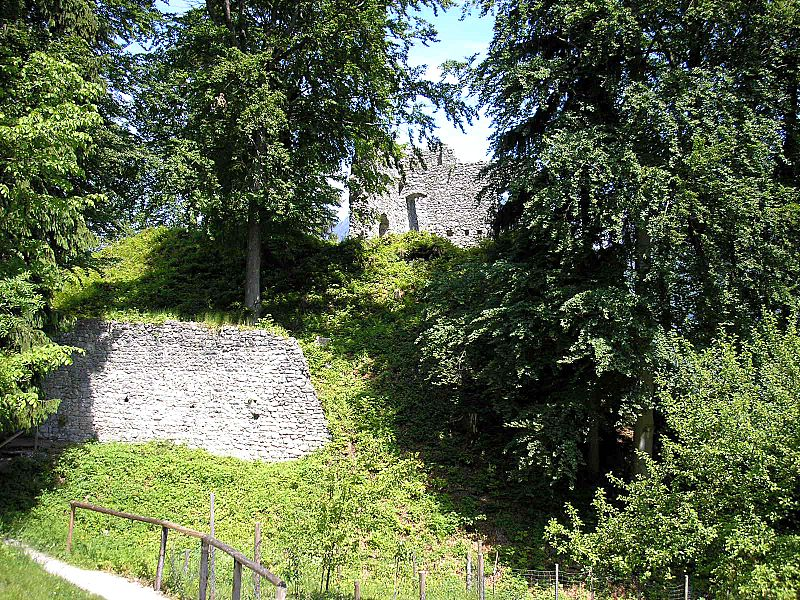
Left: the interior of the palas with its internal wall. Centre: the first outer wall and the Mittertor. Right: the west side with the wall of the outer ward and the palas.

== Literature ==
- Heinrich Spichtinger: Werdenfels, Geschichte einer Burg. – Garmisch-Partenkirchen, 1991.
- Josef Ostler, Michael Henker, Susanne Bäumler: Grafschaft Werdenfels 1294 - 1802. Garmisch-Partenkirchen, 1994.
- Michael Weithmann: Ritter und Burgen in Oberbayern - Streifzüge ins mittelalterliche Land zwischen Alpen, Donau, Lech und Salzach. Dachau, 1999, ISBN 3-89251-276-0.
- Joachim Zeune, Heinrich Spichtinger: Burg Werdenfels – Kleiner Führer. – Garmisch-Partenkirchen, ca. 2000.
- Werner Meyer: Burgen in Oberbayern - Ein Handbuch von Werner Meyer. Verlag Weidlich, Würzburg, 1986, ISBN 3-8035-1279-4, pp. 129-131.
