= Germar =

Germar is a German-language masculine given name and surname:

== Given name ==
- Germar Rudolf (born 1964), German chemist and Holocaust denier

== Family name ==
- Ernst Friedrich Germar (1786–1853), German professor, director of the Mineralogical Museum at Halle, and an entomologist
- Manfred Germar (born 1935), West German athlete
- Germar (noble house) is a Thuringian noble family from Görmar, Mühlhausen
