= King's House on Schachen =

Alpine chalet of Ludwig II of Bavaria

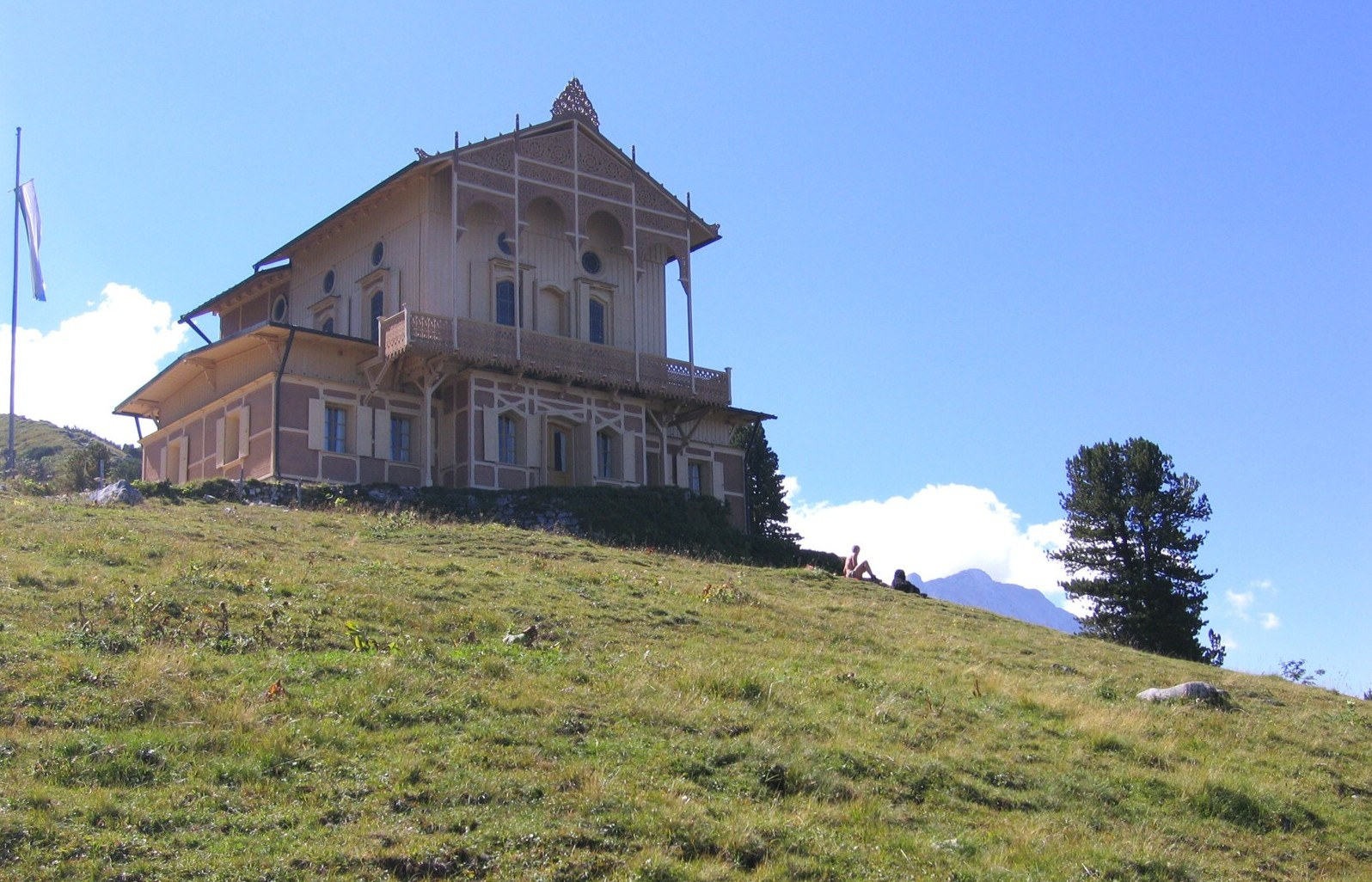
- View of the King's House

- Location within Bavaria Location within Germany

General information
- Type: Hunting lodge
- Architectural style: Timber framed
- Location: Garmisch-Partenkirchen, Germany
- Coordinates: 47°25′10.91″N 11°6′45.31″E
- Completed: 1869–1872

Technical details
- Floor count: 2

Design and construction
- Architect: Georg von Dollmann

Website
- www.schloesser.bayern.de/deutsch/schloss/objekte/schachen.htm

UNESCO World Heritage Site
- Part of: The Palaces of King Ludwig II of Bavaria: Neuschwanstein, Linderhof, Schachen and Herrenchiemsee
- Criteria: Cultural: iv
- Reference: 1726-003
- Inscription: 2025 (47th Session)
- Area: 0.025 ha (0.062 acres)
- Buffer zone: 3,773 ha (9,320 acres)

The King's House on Schachen (German: Königshaus am Schachen) is a small villa (Schlösschen) at Schachen, Wetterstein Formation, about 10 km south of Garmisch-Partenkirchen, Bavaria, Germany, built by Ludwig II of Bavaria. The house was constructed between 1869 and 1872.

== Location ==
The King's House on Schachen is located at Schachen, at an altitude with a view of the dramatic mountain backdrop of the Wetterstein Formation, about 10 km south of Garmisch-Partenkirchen, Bavaria. It can only be reached via a 10 km forest road, or a three-hour hike, ascending 1000m either from Schloss Elmau or Garmisch-Partenkirchen, which provides a view of Zugspitze amongst others.

== History ==
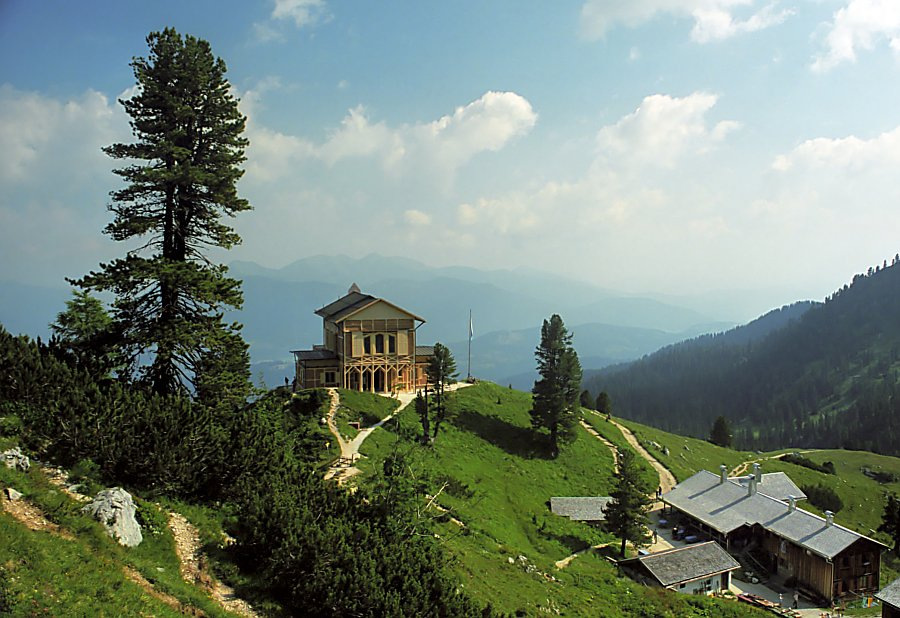
View from the rear side

The King's House on Schachen was built between 1869 and 1872 for Ludwig II of Bavaria and designed by architect Georg von Dollmann. It is often described as a hunting lodge, though Ludwig never used it for this purpose, as he didn't like to hunt, instead utilizing it for birthday and anniversary celebrations. The building is the least-known of the palaces built by Ludwig. The main hall known as the "Turkish or Moorish Room" occupies the entire upper-floor of the house, and is elaborately decorated in an Oriental fashion, more precisely in an overloaded mix of styles. The extravagant upstairs interior stands in stark contrast to the exterior and ground floor, which are rather modestly built in the style of alpine chalets, as they were often built as excursion restaurants.

In 2025, the house was designated as a World Heritage Site by UNESCO.

== Alpengarten auf dem Schachen ==
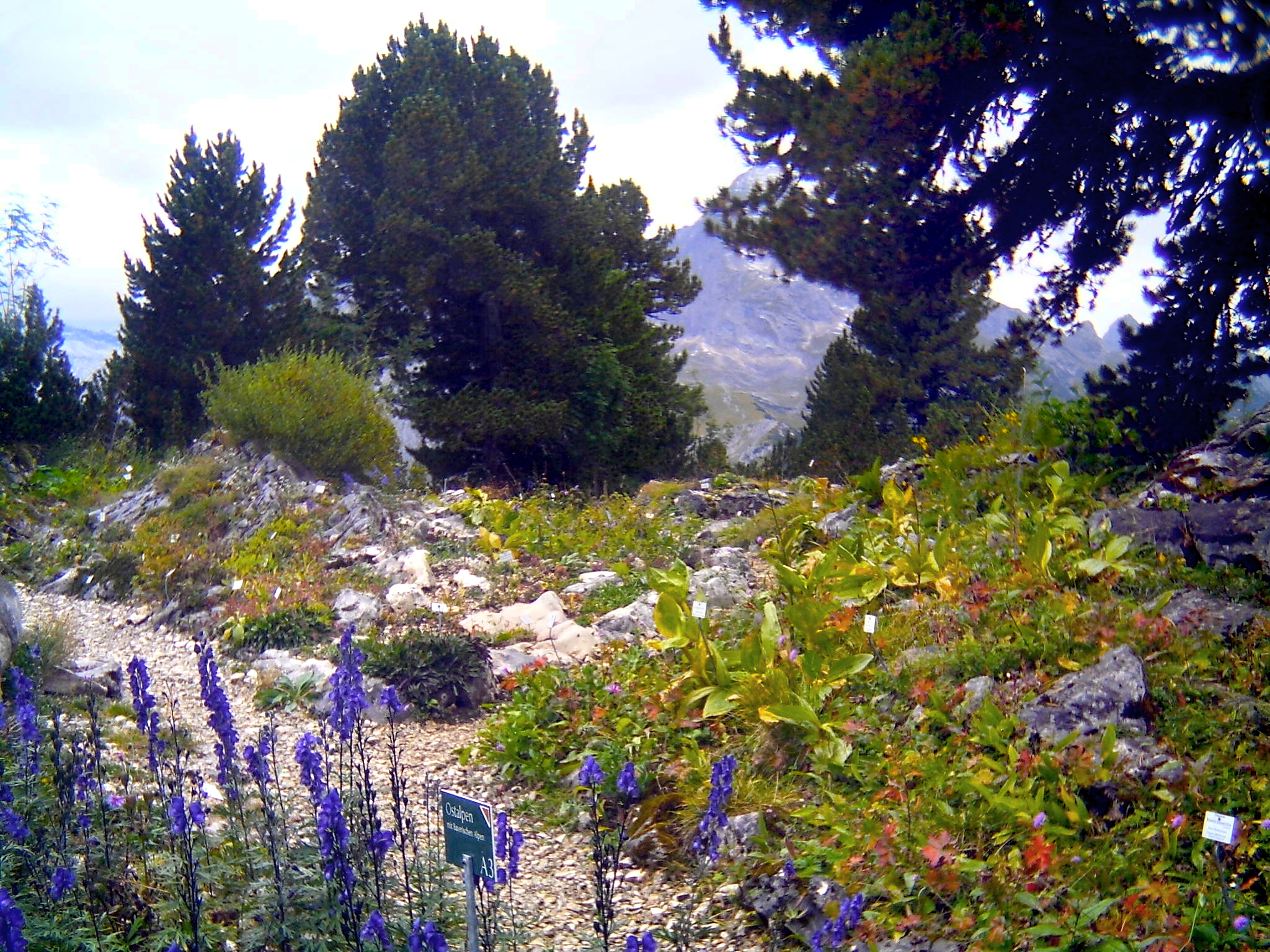
Alpinum adjacent to the King's House on Schachen

Adjacent to the house itself is the Alpengarten auf dem Schachen on about one hectare, an alpine botanical garden at about 2000m altitude, which contains over 1,000 plant species from the Alps to the Himalayas. It is maintained by the Botanischer Garten München-Nymphenburg, open during the summer months daily from 8 am to 5 pm, admission cost 2.50 euros as of 2018. Although the Wetterstein Mountains are primarily limestone, the limestone and dolomite weather differently: dolomite decomposes into a shard and splinter debris on which some plants thrive particularly well. Lime weathers chemically, calcifications arise, in which water quickly seeps away. On the other hand, the sandstone provides for loamy and low-limestone soils that hold water well.

Altogether 42 plant beds are assigned to different geographical regions, the flora of the Bavarian forest, the Alps, Carpathians, Patagonia, the Rocky Mountains – and the Himalayas.

== Gallery ==
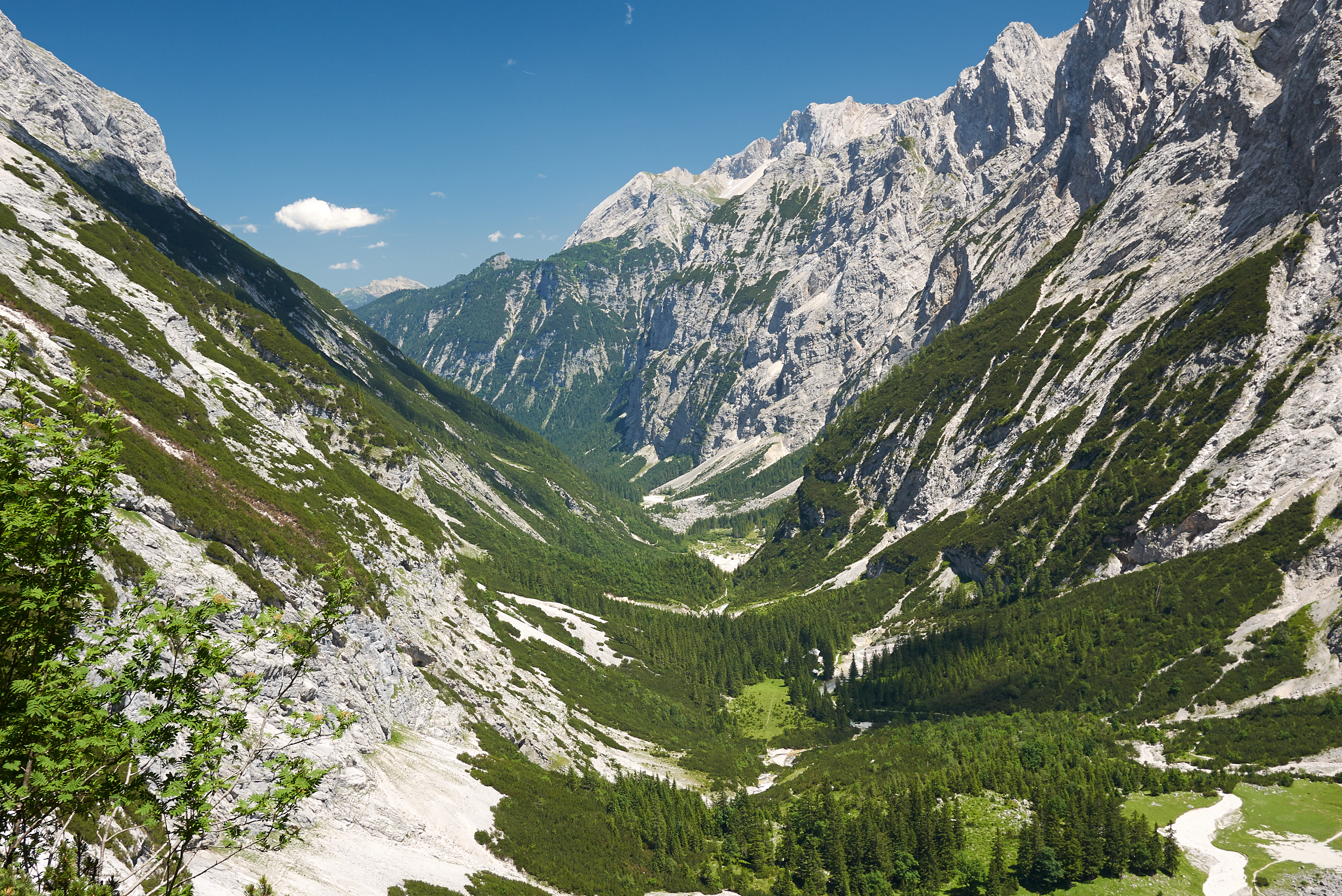
The Reintal valley

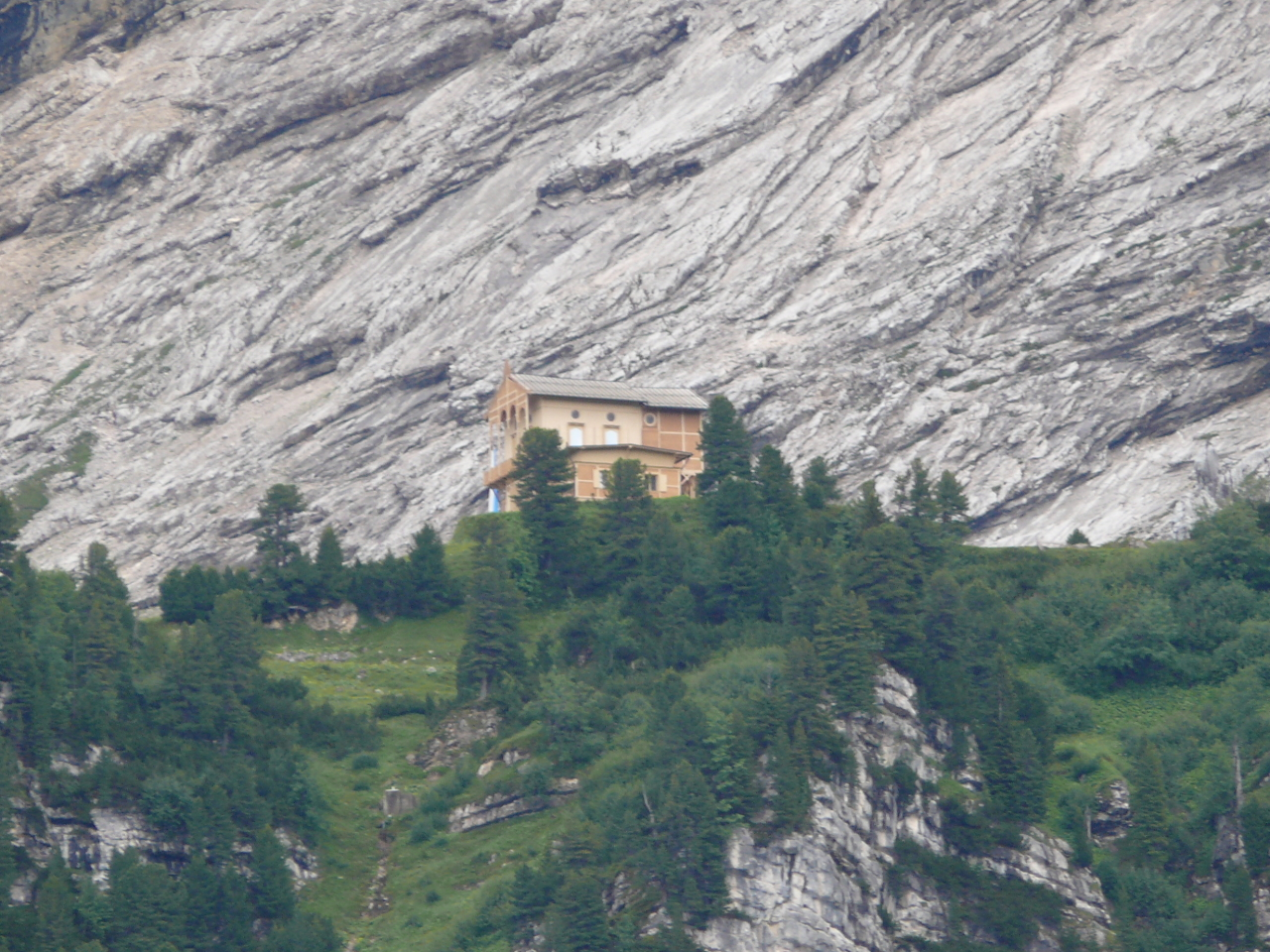
King's House taken from the Bockhütte in Reintal

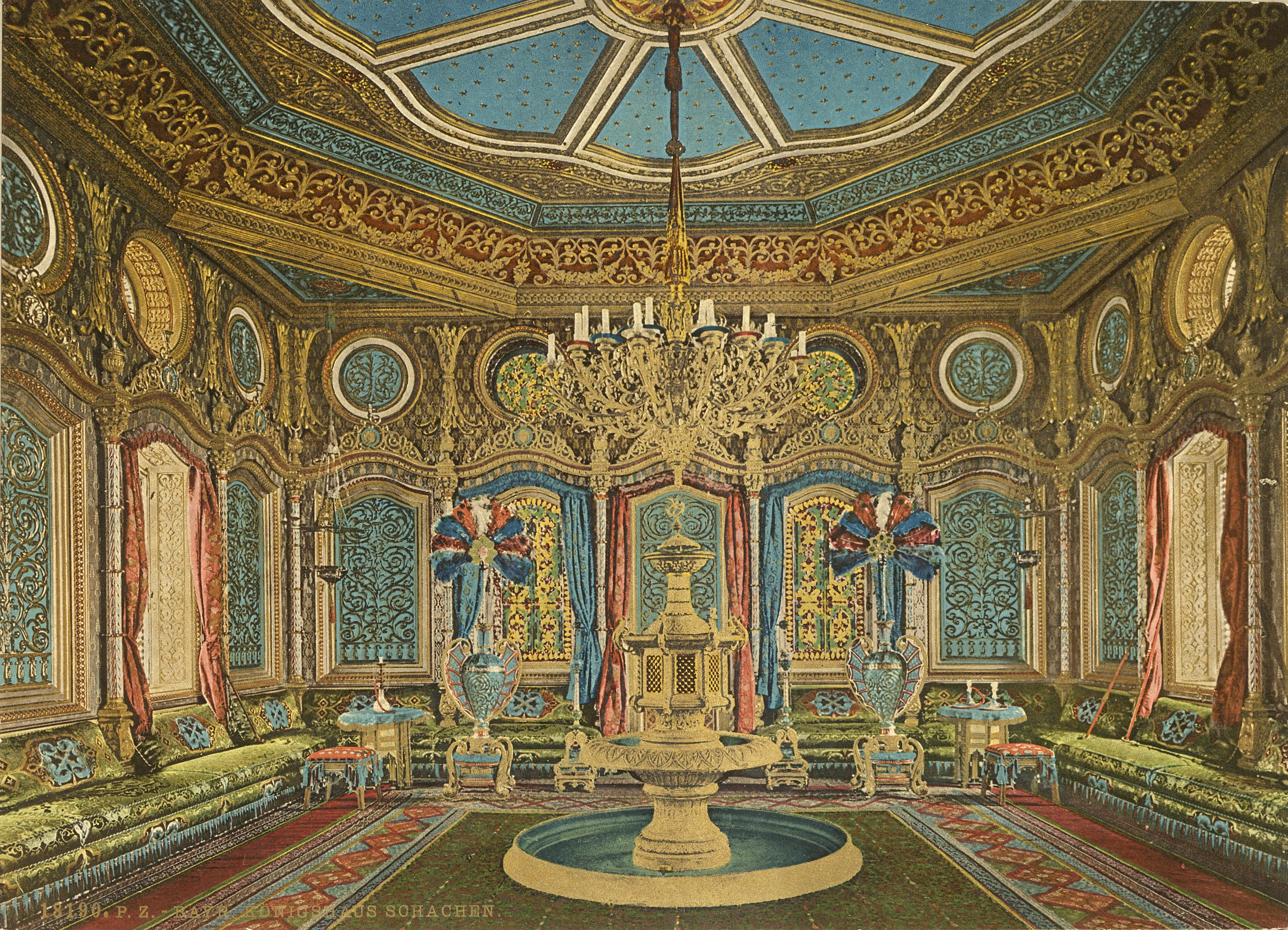
Illustrations of the Moorish Hall at the time it was built

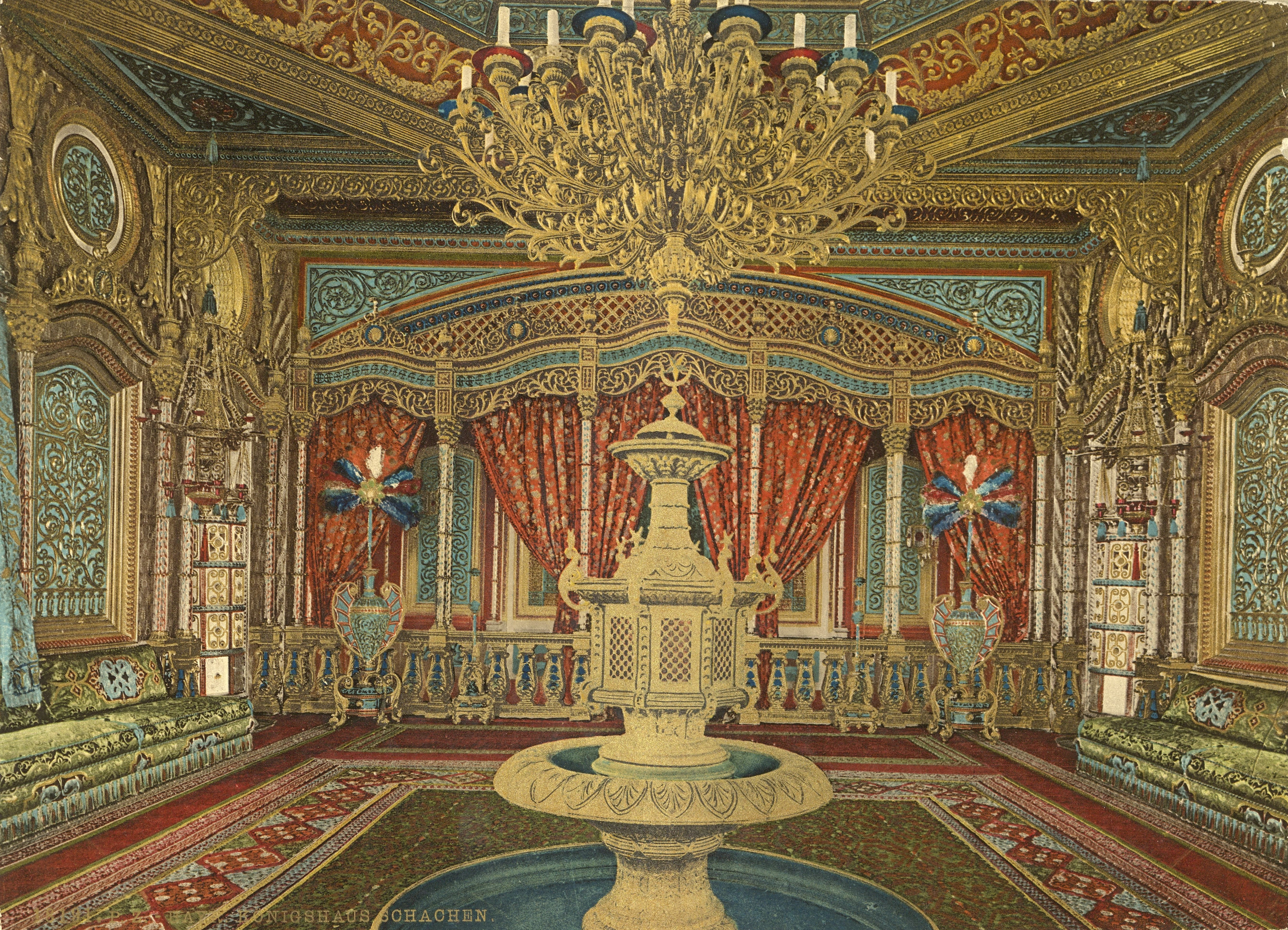
