= Frankish colonisation =

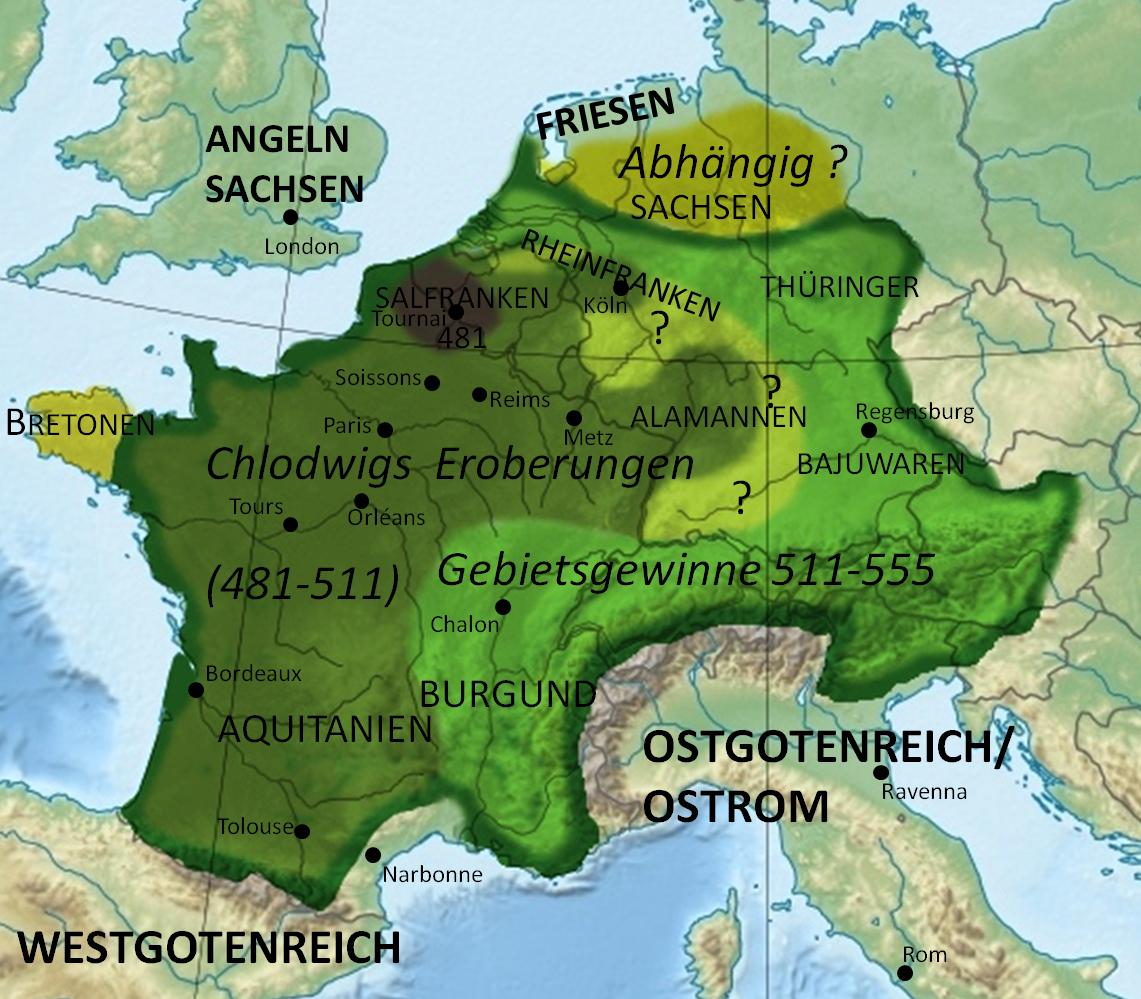
Expansion of the Merovingian Frankish Empire from the entry into government of Chlodwig (481) to the death of Theudebald (555), including presumably dependent territories

The Frankish colonisation (German: Fränkische Landnahme) refers to the colonisation of regions in present-day Germany (mainly in the Rhine-Main-Danube region) by the Franks from the 5th to the 8th centuries. It marked the end of the Migration Period in this region, because it resulted in the establishment of largely stable political and social systems.

The beginning of this colonisation and associated land appropriation came as the Merovingian king, Clovis I, defeated the Alemanni around 496 A. D. at the Battle of Zülpich.

Linked to this colonisation was an extension of Frankish rule towards the east; Francia was now divided into Neustria (part of West Francia, an area largely coextensive with present-day France), Austrasia (part of East Francia, largely coextensive with present-day Germany, initially without Saxony and Bavaria/Austria, yet including Alsace-Lorraine) and Burgundy, which, however, constantly strove to preserve its independence.

Characteristic of Frankish colonisation are the row graves and certain suffixes associated with the founding of many settlements. These include -heim, -hausen/-husen, -rod, -ingen and -weiler/-wiler. After 780 A. D. no new villages are founded with these suffixes, nor is there any evidence of later row graves. It is assumed therefore that burials now took place at the churches of the local settlement.
