= Prince-Bishopric of Freising =

Ecclesiastical principality of the Holy Roman Empire

Prince-Bishopric of Freising Fürstbistum Freising (German)
- 1294–1802
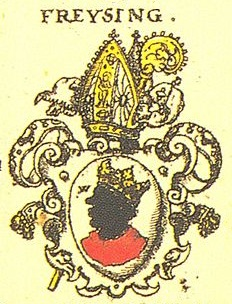
- Coat of arms
- Status: Prince-Bishopric
- Capital: Freising
- Government: Ecclesiastical principality
- Historical era: Middle Ages, Early modern period
  - Bishopric established: 739
  - Imperial immediacy: 1294
  - Joined Bavarian Circle: 1500
  - Mediatised to Bavaria and Austria: 1802
- Today part of: Germany

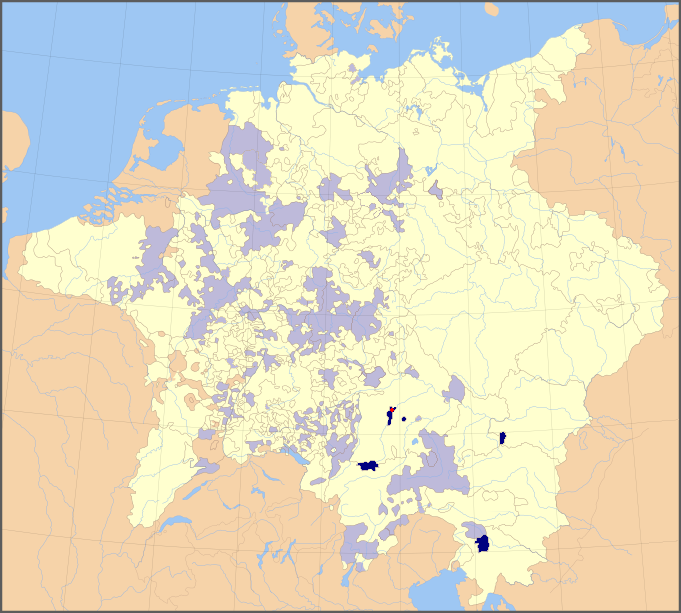
Territories belonging to ecclesiastical principalities (in blue), with the Prince-Bishopric of Freising in dark blue

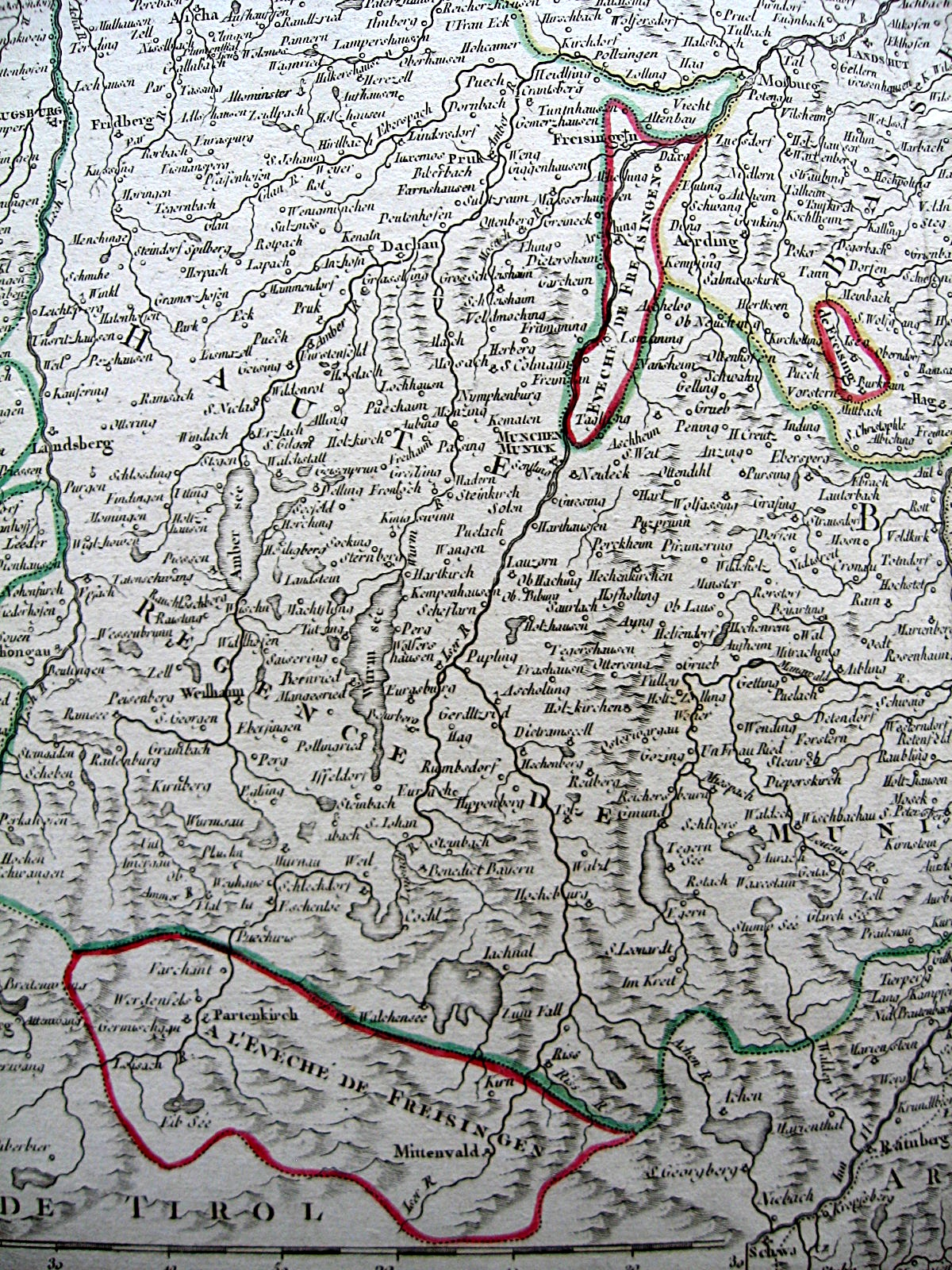
The Bishopric's three western enclaves: Freising-Isserain, Burgrain and Werdenfels.

The coat of arms of Pope Benedict XVI, former archbishop of Munich and Freising, is replete with Freising iconography: the Crowned Moor of Freising and St. Corbinian's saddled bear.

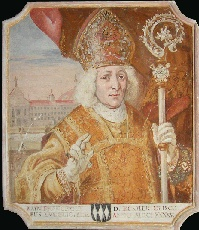
Prince-Bishop Johann Franz Ecker, 1696–1727

The Prince-Bishopric of Freising (German: Hochstift Freising) was an ecclesiastical principality of the Holy Roman Empire from 1294 until its secularisation in the early years of the 19th century.

The Prince-Bishopric of Freising should not be confused with the diocese of Freising, which was considerably larger and over which the prince-bishop's authority was that of an ordinary bishop and therefore limited to spiritual and pastoral matters.

== Geography ==
While the prince-bishopric's territory was comparatively small, it was very fragmented and its lands were dispersed over a wide area, from central Bavaria and Tyrol in the west to Austria, Styria and Carniola in the east (see map).

In 1800, the 15,000 subjects of the Prince-Bishop lived in the following areas:

- Immediate lordships:
  - the City of Freising on the Isar river, located about 35 km (22 mi) north of Munich, with a population of approximately 4,000 (as of 1800 AD)
  - the adjacent County of Ismaning (also called Yserrain), a narrow band of territory stretching along the east bank of the Isar (Yser) river, from Freising in the north to the outskirts of Munich in the south
  - the exclave of Burgrain centred around Isen Abbey, east of Yserrain
  - the County of Werdenfels, located between Munich and Innsbruck, with the towns of Garmisch, Partenkirchen and Mittenwald.
- Mediate estates:
  - several small territories in Old Bavaria (Altbayern)
  - Entersdorf, Hollenburg, Ulmerfeld, and Waidhofen in Austria (present-day Lower Austria)
  - Wölz in Styria
  - Innichen (San Candido) in Tyrol (present-day South Tyrol, Italy)
  - Bischoflack (Škofja Loka) and Klingenfels (Klevevž) in Carniola (present-day Slovenia)
  - County of Cadore in the Patria del Friuli.

== History ==
=== Foundation ===
The Benedictine abbey of Freising was founded by Saint Corbinian circa 723–730 although it was only in 739 that the diocese as such was established by Saint Boniface.

In 783, Bishop Atto von Kienberger acquired the town of Innichen (San Candido) in the South Tyrol after having delivered on his promise to the lord of the area, Duke Tassilo III of Bavaria, to build a Benedictine convent there. He then acquired the lordship of Burgrain in 808. Emperor Otto II donated the lordship of Bischoflack in Carniola (now Škofja Loka, Slovenia) in 973 and Henry II the lordships of Wölzer and Katschtal (Styria) in 1007. About 250 years later, the possessions of the bishops were to increase substantially with the acquisition of the rich county of Werdenfels in the late 13th century.

In 1294, the bishop was raised to the status of prince-bishop and thus became an Estate of the Empire enjoying imperial immediacy. A few years later, Duke Ludwig of Bavaria sold several towns along the Isar River to the bishop. That area became known as the county of Yserrain.

In contrast to the prince-bishopric which was made of several disparate small enclaves, the diocese of Freising, administered by the same bishop, was very large and covered most of the surrounding duchy of Bavaria, including the capital Munich. This was to remain a source of friction with the increasingly ambitious House of Wittelsbach whose dukes/electors tried more than once to bring Freising under their authority. The prince-bishops were nevertheless able to maintain their independence despite the fact that the Wittelsbach, the most powerful Catholic dynasty of the Holy Roman Empire after the Habsburg, succeeded now and then to have one of their own elected to the episcopal See.

As with all German prince-bishoprics, the canons of the cathedral chapter were solely responsible for electing a new prince-bishop, although outside interference from the Emperor and powerful neighbours, such as the Bavarian Wittelsbach, was to be expected.

Freising was incorporated into the Bavarian Circle when the imperial circles were set up in the early years of the 16th century. The prince-bishop had seat and voice in the Reichstag as a member of the Ecclesiastical Bench of the College of Ruling Princes.

Like other parts of the Holy Roman Empire, Freising did not escape the ravages of the Thirty Years' War and while it paid the ransom demanded by the Swedish King Gustavus Adolphus in 1632, the city was still pillaged. There was then to be famine and pestilence when the Swedes invaded again in 1646. A dark chapter of the history of Freising in the late 17th century was the trial and execution of several Freising children during the witch hunts that desolated Germany at the time.

=== Golden Era ===
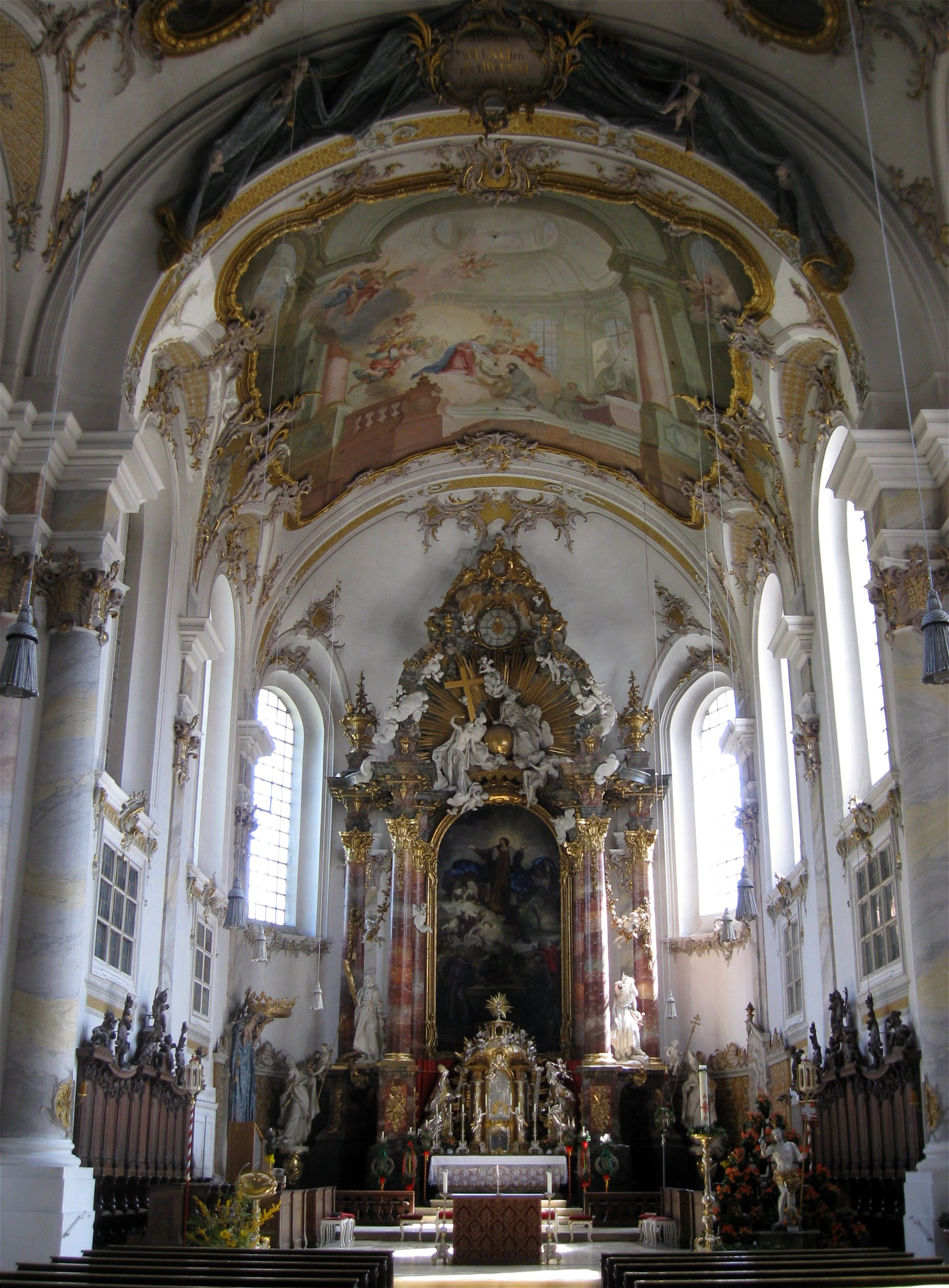
The rococo interior of St. Peter and Paul Parish Church, Freising

Freising was to reach its peak under Prince-Bishop Johann Franz Ecker von Kapfing und Liechtenech (1696–1727) who founded the first Hochschule (high school) in 1697 and carried out extensive renovations of the cathedral church on the occasion of the 1000th anniversary of the diocese (1724). He also commissioned the Benedictine monk Karl Meichelbeck to write a new chronicle of the diocese, Historia frisingensis, considered by many to be one of the first examples of critical historical research in Germany.

=== End of the Prince-Bishopric ===
Like the great majority of the German ecclesiastical principalities, Freising was secularised in the course of the mass secularisations of 1802–03. In November 1802, Bavarian officials and troops entered the city and the territory of the prince-bishopric was annexed to Bavaria, except for the distant Styrian and Slovenian enclaves which were annexed by Austria.

Church property was expropriated and the former capital city of the prince-bishops became one more small country town of the new kingdom. In 1821, the former diocese of Freising was absorbed into the newly created Archdiocese of Munich and Freising, whose seat was transferred to Munich.

=== The Freising Manuscripts ===
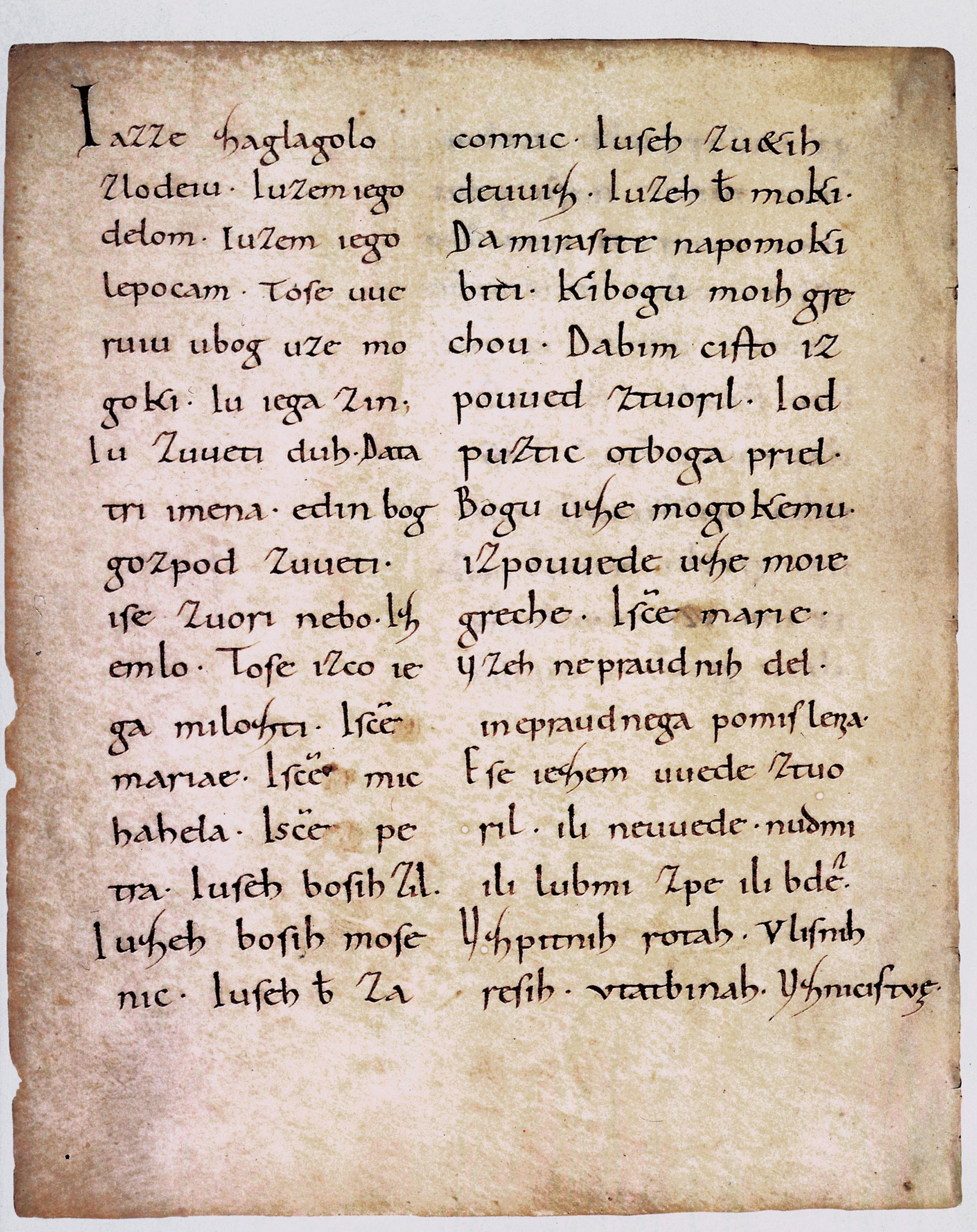
Page of the Freising Manuscripts in Slovene

The name of Freising is associated with the Freising Manuscripts, a unique manuscript of the late Carolingian period which owes its fame primarily to its few pages written in Slovene, the oldest known text in that language. The late 10th-century document dates from the time of Bishop Abraham of Freising. Like his predecessors, Bishop Abraham had been actively involved in missionary work among the Slavic populations east of the Alps, which explains why an area of Slovenia (Skofja Loka) was to become part of the distant Prince-Bishopric of Freising for several centuries.

The manuscript came to light after the content of the rich episcopal library of Freising was transferred to Munich after the secularisation of Freising in 1802–03.

== Books ==
- Georg Urban Zacher (1843). Eine alte Grenzbeschreibung des Hochstifts Freysing. Oberbayerisches Archiv, Bd. 4, pp. 425–428.
- Stahleder/Steigelmann (1974). Historischer Atlas von Bayern: Hochstift Freising. Altbayern, Reihe I, Heft 33.
- Dieter Albrecht (1955). Historischer Atlas von Bayern: Grafschaft Werdenfels (Hochstift Freising). Altbayern, Reihe I, Heft 9.
