= Bundesstraße 23 =

Federal highway in Germany

B 23
- Bundesstraße 23

Route information
- Length: 59.2 km (36.8 mi)

Major junctions
- North end: Peiting
- South end: Austrian border near Garmisch-Partenkirchen

Location
- Country: Germany
- States: Bavaria

Highway system
- Roads in Germany; Autobahns; List; Federal; List; State; E-roads

The Bundesstraße 23 (abbr. B23) is a German federal highway (German: Bundesstraße) in Bavaria that runs about 59.2 kilometres, from Peiting to the Austrian border near Garmisch-Partenkirchen. This highway (partially), along with the Bundesstraße 17 and Bundesstraße 472 highways, constitute the “German Alpine Road” (German: Deutsche Alpenstraße). Coupled with the Bundesstraße 2 highway, it passes through cities such as Mittenwald, Innsbruck and the Brenner Pass.

== Course ==
The B 23 starts at the B 472 (bypass Schongau - Peiting) exit Peiting-south in the Weilheim-Schongau district and initially leads to Rottenbuch. A few years ago, this stretch was in a poor state of development, during which some more serious accidents have occurred. In recent years, this segment has been widened.

After the main through-road of Rottenbuch reaches the line the “Echelsbacher Brücke”. The 183 m long and 76 m high arch bridge spanning the Ammer. On the bridge there is also the border of the district of Garmisch-Partenkirchen.

The road passes Bad Bayersoien and reaches Saulgrub. Currently, a local diversion around Saulgrub is being built to ease traffic congestion from through traffic. In Saulgrub, the B 23 meets the Ammergau Railway (Murnau / Oberammergau) for the first time.

It follows village Unterammergau. The road pass the local diversion of Oberammergau and reach Ettal. After the road cross the village, it achieve the “Ettaler Sattel” (869 NHN) the highest point on the route. The way winding along twisting road into Loisachtal. Here reaches the route Oberau and the Bundesstraße 2. The two roads run parallel to six kilometers (3.7 miles) towards the south. After the bypass Farchant separates the B 23 from the B 2 and runs in a southwesterly direction to Garmisch-Partenkirchen.

After B 23 has crossed Griesen, the route ends at the border with Austria (Tyrol), where it merges into the Austrian B 187 (towards Lermoos, Fernpassstraße, Inn valley).

== History ==
=== Origins ===
Probably in the Roman period, but no later than at the time Louis IV, there was a connection between the Via Claudia in the Lech Valley to the Brenner road in the Loisach Valley.

The most difficult part of this route led from Rottenbuch to Bad Bayersoien by Echelsbach gorge. Therefore between 8 November 1928 and 27 April 1930 Echelsbacher Brücke was built for 900,000 ℛ︁ℳ︁.

=== Former routes and designations ===
The Bundesstraße 23 arise from Reichsstraße 23 at 1949. At that time, the R 23 began in Peiting at the intersection "Schongauer Straße" / "Oberere Straße" / "Guggenbergerstraße" at the then R 17 and ended in Oberau at the junction with the R 2. With the introduction of the Bundesstraßen the B 23 was extended on Farchant to Garmisch-Partenkirchen. There they led to the B 24.

=== Alterations ===
The Local diversion Oberammergau opened to traffic in 1989.

The extension of the route from Garmisch-Partenkirchen to the Austrian border at Griesen in 1991. The B 24 was integrate in the new B 23. The remainder in Garmisch-Partenkirchen municipality was downgraded.

In 1991, following the release a segment of the bypass Schongau - Peiting the beginning of the B 23 changed to B 17 exit Peiting-West. The main through-road of Peiting was downgraded to a state road (German: Staatsstraße). The relocation to the present location was made after completion of bypass Schongau - Peiting in 1997

In May 2000 the Farchanter Tunnel was opened.

=== Further expansion ===
Currently (March 2010) the following expansion in planning or under construction:

- Eastern local diversion Saulgrub (Progress since February 2009 under construction)
- Local diversion Oberau (urgent needs in the Federal Transport Infrastructure Plan 2003)
- Garmisch-Partenkirchen western local diversion with Kramertunnel (planning: an action against the zoning decision on 23 June 2009)

== Tourism ==
=== Scenic Routes ===
Between the St2059 (near Rottenbuch) and Garmisch-Partenkirchen, leads the “German Alpine Road” (German: Deutsche Alpenstraße) along the B 23.

=== Attractions ===
Among the sights along the route:

- "Augustiner-Chorherrenstift" in Rottenbuch
- "Echelsbacher Brücke" between Rottenbuch and Bad Bayersoien
- with "Lüftlmalerei" decorated facades in Oberammergau
- Oberammergau Passion Play
- Linderhof Palace between Oberammergau and Ettal
- Ettal Abbey

=== Scenic routes ===
The entire route is scenic. Put the divided:

- Alpine foothills (Peiting till Saulgrub)
- Ammergau Alps (Saulgrub till Ettal)
- Bavarian Prealps and Loisachtal (Ettal till Garmisch-Partenkirchen)
- Wetterstein with Zugspitze (Garmisch-Partenkirchen till Austrian border)

=== Spas ===
Along the route are the spas Bad Bayersoien, Bad Kohlgrub and Ettal.

== See also ==
- List of federal highways in Germany
