= Grafenaschau station =

Railway station in Germany

Grafenaschau
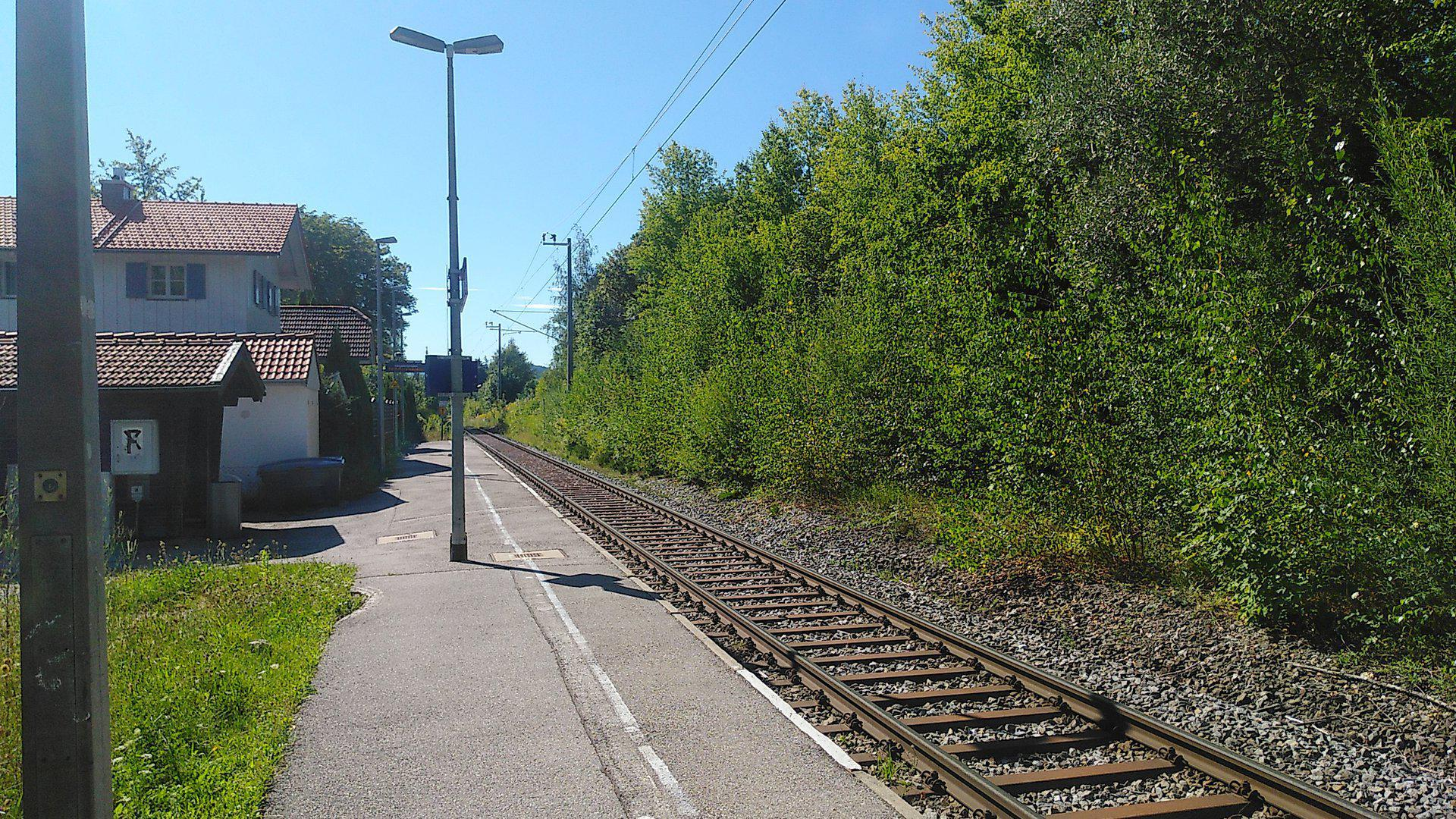
- The station platform in 2020

General information
- Location: Moosrainer Straße 1 Murnau am Staffelsee, Bavaria; Germany
- Coordinates: 47°40′01″N 11°08′15″E
- Owner: DB Netz
- Operator: DB Station&Service
- Lines: Ammergau Railway (KBS 963)
- Distance: 5.6 km (3.5 mi) from Murnau
- Platforms: 1 side platform
- Tracks: 1
- Train operators: DB Regio Bayern

Other information
- Station code: 2228
- DS100 code: MGRA
- IBNR: 8002343
- Category: 7

Services
Preceding station	DB Regio Bayern	Following station
Bad Kohlgrub towards Oberammergau	RB 63	Seeleiten-Berggeist towards Murnau
Location

Grafenaschau station (German: Haltepunkt Grafenaschau) is a railway station in the municipality of Murnau am Staffelsee, in Bavaria, Germany. It is located on the Ammergau Railway of Deutsche Bahn. The station is named for the village of Grafenaschau in the municipality of Schwaigen, located roughly 3 kilometres (1.9 mi) to the southwest.

== Services ==
As of the December 2021 timetable change, the following services stop at Grafenaschau:

- RB: hourly service between Oberammergau and Murnau.
