= Bad Kohlgrub station =

Railway station in Bad Kohlgrub, Germany

Bad Kohlgrub
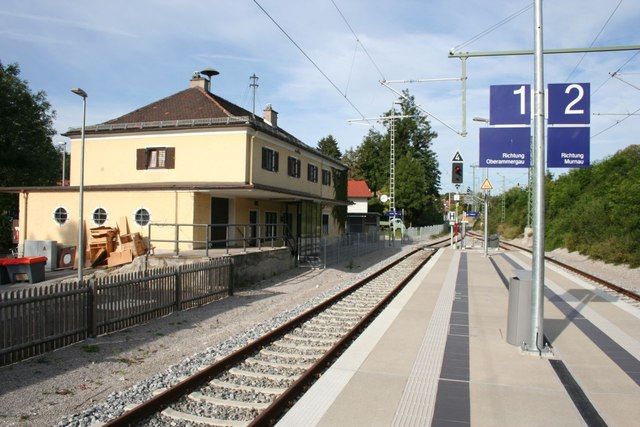
- The station platform in 2012

General information
- Location: Bahnhofstr. 19; Bad Kohlgrub, Bavaria; Germany
- Coordinates: 47°40′05″N 11°03′30″E
- Owner: DB Netz
- Operator: DB Station&Service
- Lines: Ammergau Railway (KBS 963)
- Distance: 11.7 km (7.3 mi) from Murnau
- Platforms: 1 island platform
- Tracks: 2
- Train operators: DB Regio Bayern
- Connections: Regionalverkehr Oberbayern buses

Other information
- Station code: 290
- DS100 code: MBKG
- IBNR: 8000716
- Category: 6

Services
Preceding station	DB Regio Bayern	Following station
Bad Kohlgrub Kurhaus towards Oberammergau	RB 63	Grafenaschau towards Murnau
Location

Bad Kohlgrub station (German: Bahnhof Bad Kohlgrub) is a railway station in the municipality of Bad Kohlgrub, in Bavaria, Germany. It is located on the Ammergau Railway of Deutsche Bahn.

== Services ==
As of the December 2021 timetable change, the following services stop at Bad Kohlgrub:

- RB: hourly service between Oberammergau and Murnau.
