= Altenau (Bay) station =

Railway station in Saulgrub, Germany

Altenau (Bay)
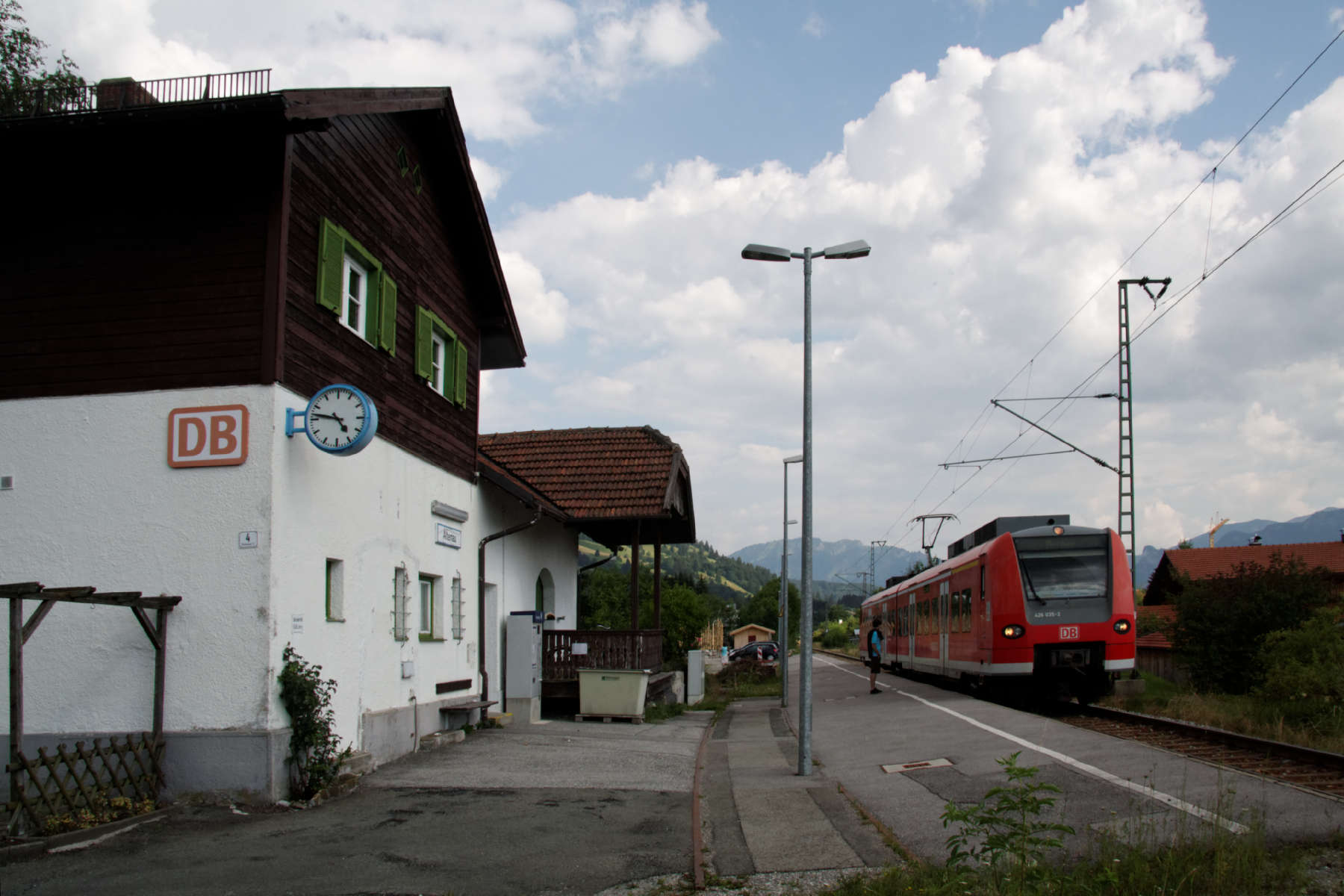
- The station in 2011

General information
- Location: Wurmansauer Str. 4 Saulgrub, Bavaria; Germany
- Coordinates: 47°38′54″N 11°01′03″E
- Owner: DB Netz
- Operator: DB Station&Service
- Lines: Ammergau Railway (KBS 963)
- Distance: 16.6 km (10.3 mi) from Murnau
- Platforms: 1 side platform
- Tracks: 1
- Train operators: DB Regio Bayern
- Connections: Regionalverkehr Oberbayern buses

Other information
- Station code: 82
- DS100 code: MALT
- IBNR: 8000515
- Category: 7

Services
Preceding station	DB Regio Bayern	Following station
Unterammergau towards Oberammergau	RB 63	Saulgrub towards Murnau
Location

Altenau (Bay) station (German: Haltepunkt Altenau (Bay)) is a railway station in the municipality of Saulgrub, in Bavaria, Germany. It is located on the Ammergau Railway of Deutsche Bahn.

== Services ==
As of the December 2021 timetable change, the following services stop at Altenau (Bay):

- RB: hourly service between Oberammergau and Murnau.
