= Saulgrub station =

Railway station in Saulgrub, Germany

Saulgrub
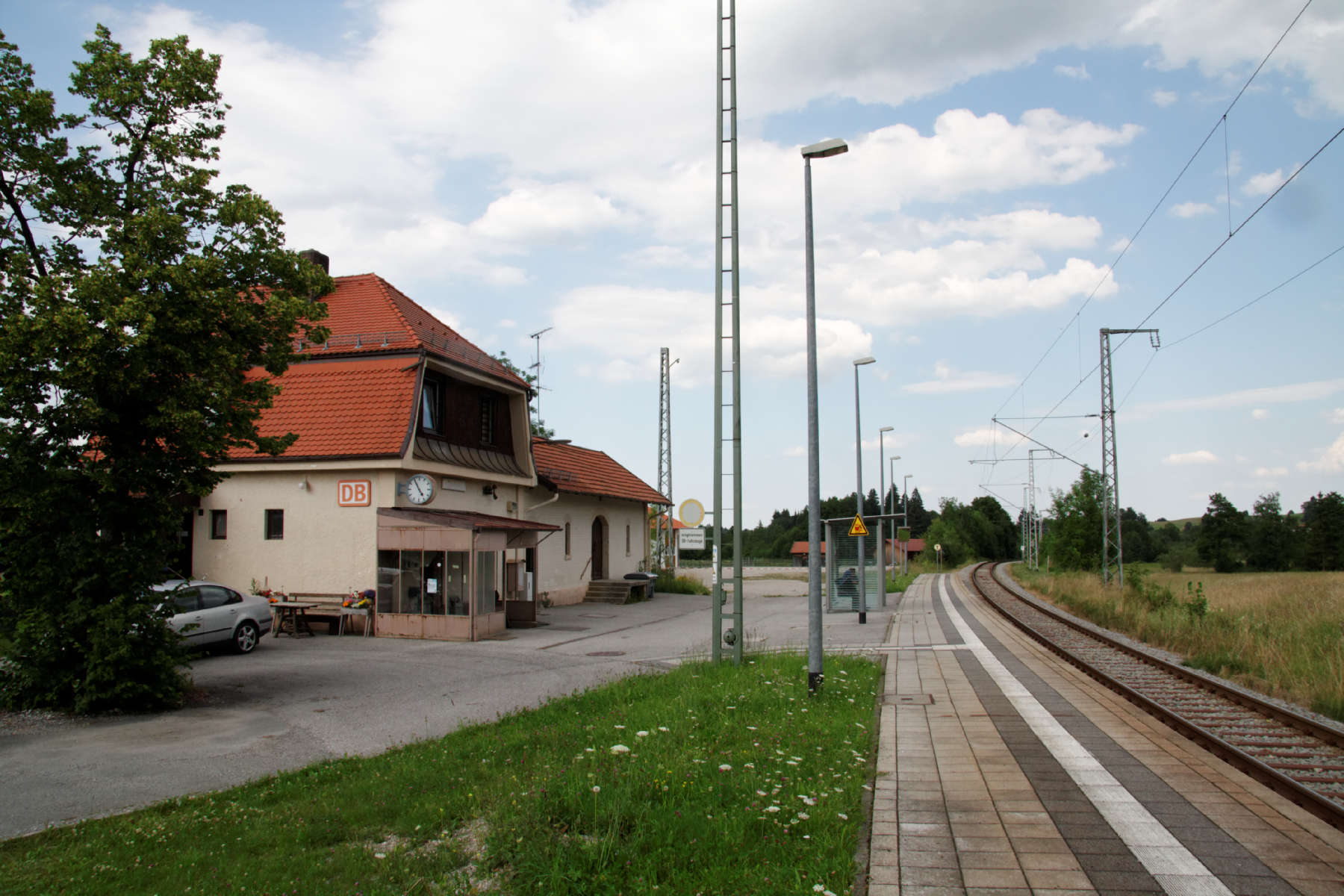
- The station in 2011

General information
- Location: Bahnhofplatz 4 Saulgrub, Bavaria; Germany
- Coordinates: 47°39′58″N 11°01′31″E
- Owner: DB Netz
- Operator: DB Station&Service
- Lines: Ammergau Railway (KBS 963)
- Distance: 14.3 km (8.9 mi) from Murnau
- Platforms: 1 side platform
- Tracks: 1
- Train operators: DB Regio Bayern
- Connections: Regionalverkehr Oberbayern buses

Other information
- Station code: 5521
- DS100 code: MSGB
- IBNR: 8005302
- Category: 7

Services
Preceding station	DB Regio Bayern	Following station
Altenau (Bay) towards Oberammergau	RB 63	Bad Kohlgrub Kurhaus towards Murnau
Location

Saulgrub station (German: Haltepunkt Saulgrub) is a railway station in the municipality of Saulgrub, in Bavaria, Germany. It is located on the Ammergau Railway of Deutsche Bahn.

== Services ==
As of the December 2021 timetable change, the following services stop at Saulgrub:

- RB: hourly service between Oberammergau and Murnau.
