= Bad Kohlgrub Kurhaus station =

Railway station in Germany

Bad Kohlgrub Kurhaus
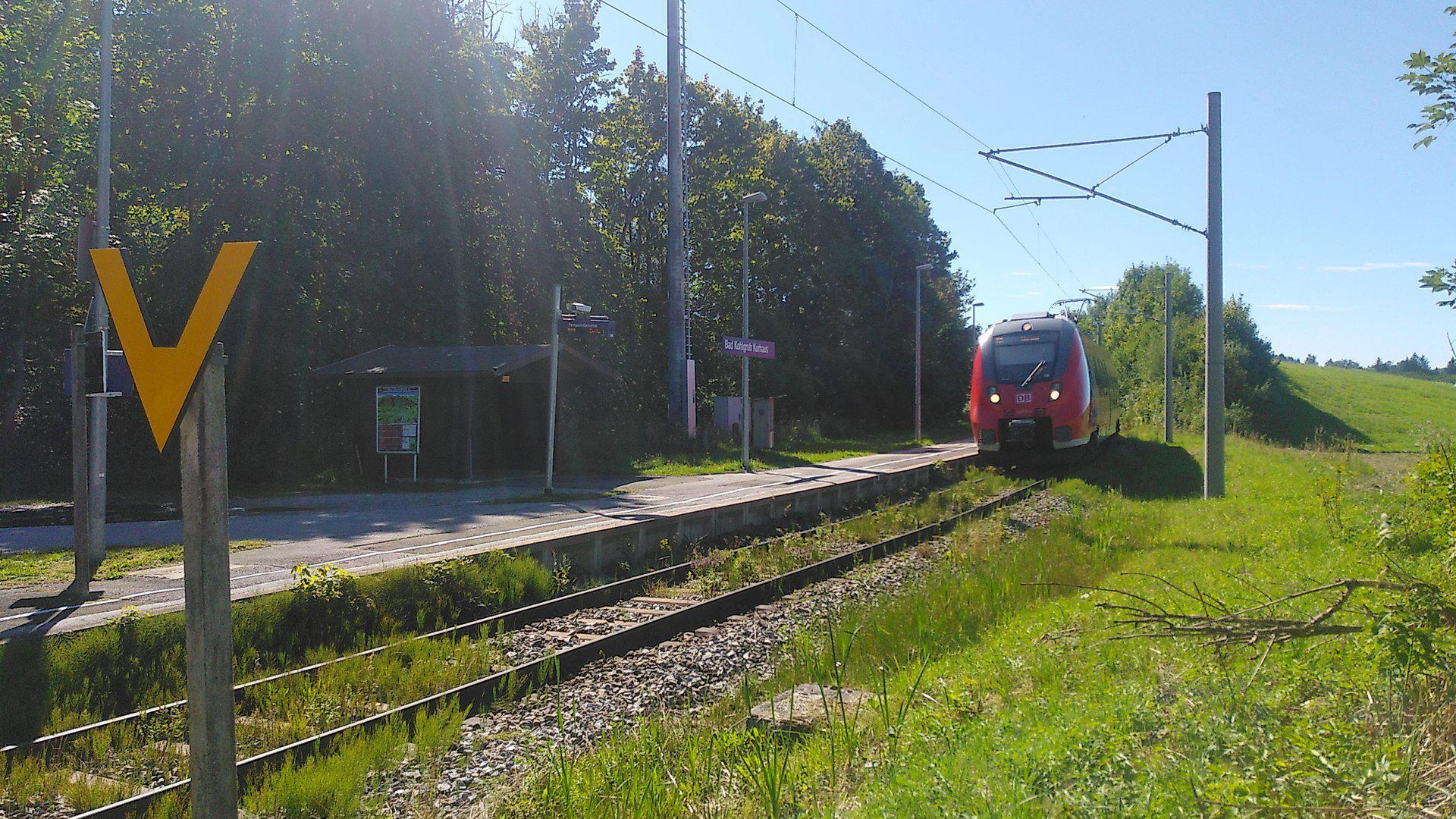
- The station in 2020

General information
- Location: Saulgruber Straße 30; Bad Kohlgrub, Bavaria; Germany
- Coordinates: 47°40′13″N 11°02′21″E
- Owner: DB Netz
- Operator: DB Station&Service
- Lines: Ammergau Railway (KBS 963)
- Distance: 13.1 km (8.1 mi) from Murnau
- Platforms: 1 side platform
- Tracks: 1
- Train operators: DB Regio Bayern
- Connections: Regionalverkehr Oberbayern buses

Other information
- Station code: 291
- DS100 code: MBKK
- IBNR: 8000717
- Category: 7

Services
Preceding station	DB Regio Bayern	Following station
Saulgrub towards Oberammergau	RB 63	Bad Kohlgrub towards Murnau
Location

Bad Kohlgrub Kurhaus station (German: Haltepunkt Bad Kohlgrub Kurhaus) is a railway station in the municipality of Bad Kohlgrub, in Bavaria, Germany. It is located on the Ammergau Railway of Deutsche Bahn.

== Services ==
As of the December 2021 timetable change, the following services stop at Bad Kohlgrub Kurhaus:

- RB: hourly service between Oberammergau and Murnau.
