= Seeleiten-Berggeist station =

Railway station in Germany

Seeleiten-Berggeist
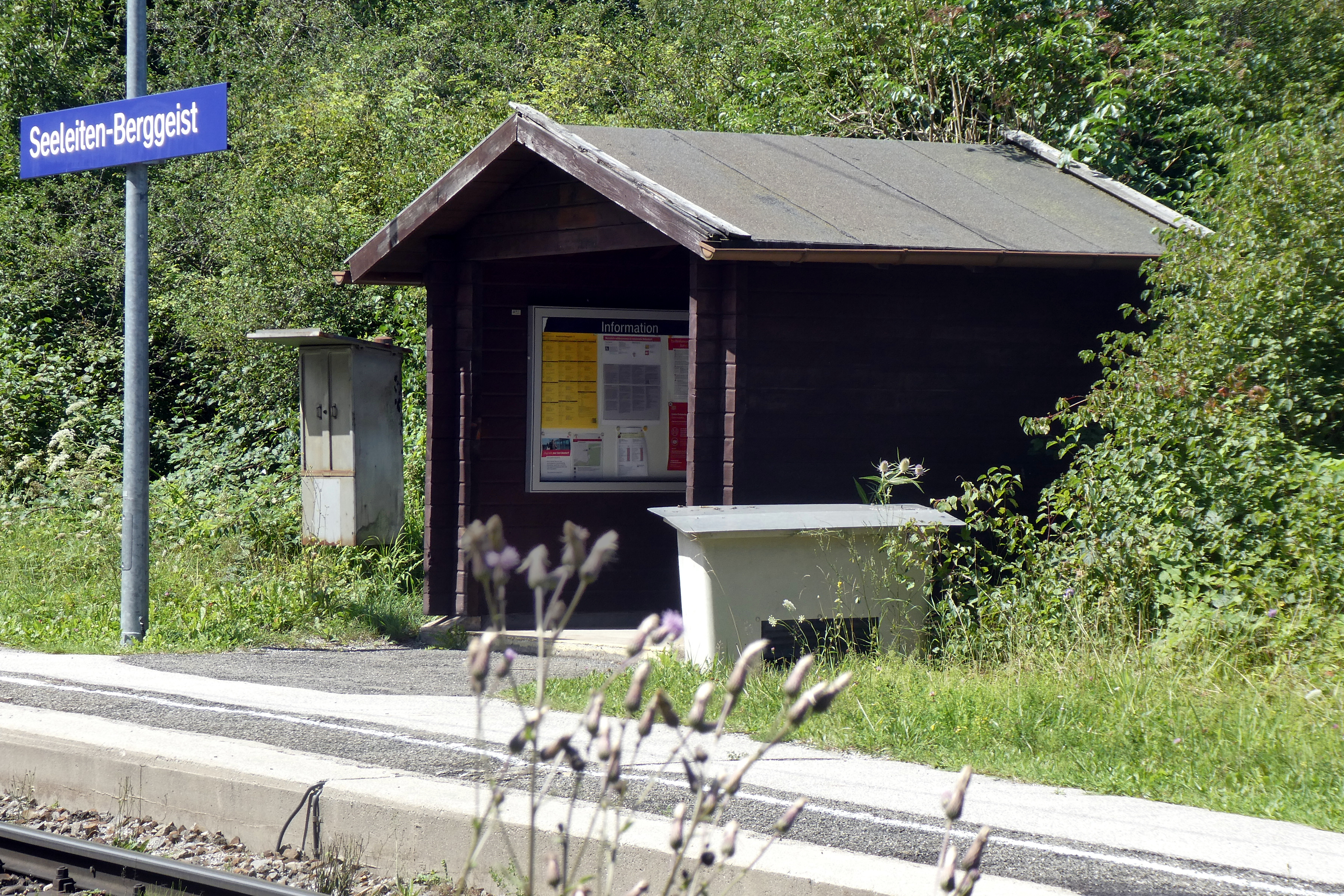
- The station platform in 2020

General information
- Location: Berggeist 1 Murnau am Staffelsee, Bavaria; Germany
- Coordinates: 47°40′16″N 11°09′57″E
- Owner: DB Netz
- Operator: DB Station&Service
- Lines: Ammergau Railway (KBS 963)
- Distance: 3.3 km (2.1 mi) from Murnau
- Platforms: 1 side platform
- Tracks: 1
- Train operators: DB Regio Bayern
- Connections: Regionalverkehr Oberbayern buses

Other information
- Station code: 5789
- DS100 code: MSEB
- IBNR: 8005506
- Category: 7

Services
Preceding station	DB Regio Bayern	Following station
Grafenaschau towards Oberammergau	RB 63	Murnau Ort towards Murnau
Location

Seeleiten-Berggeist station (German: Haltepunkt Seeleiten-Berggeist) is a railway station in the municipality of Murnau am Staffelsee, in Bavaria, Germany. It is located on the Ammergau Railway of Deutsche Bahn.

== Services ==
As of the December 2021 timetable change, the following services stop at Seeleiten-Berggeist:

- RB: hourly service between Oberammergau and Murnau.
