= Unterammergau station =

Railway station in Germany

Unterammergau
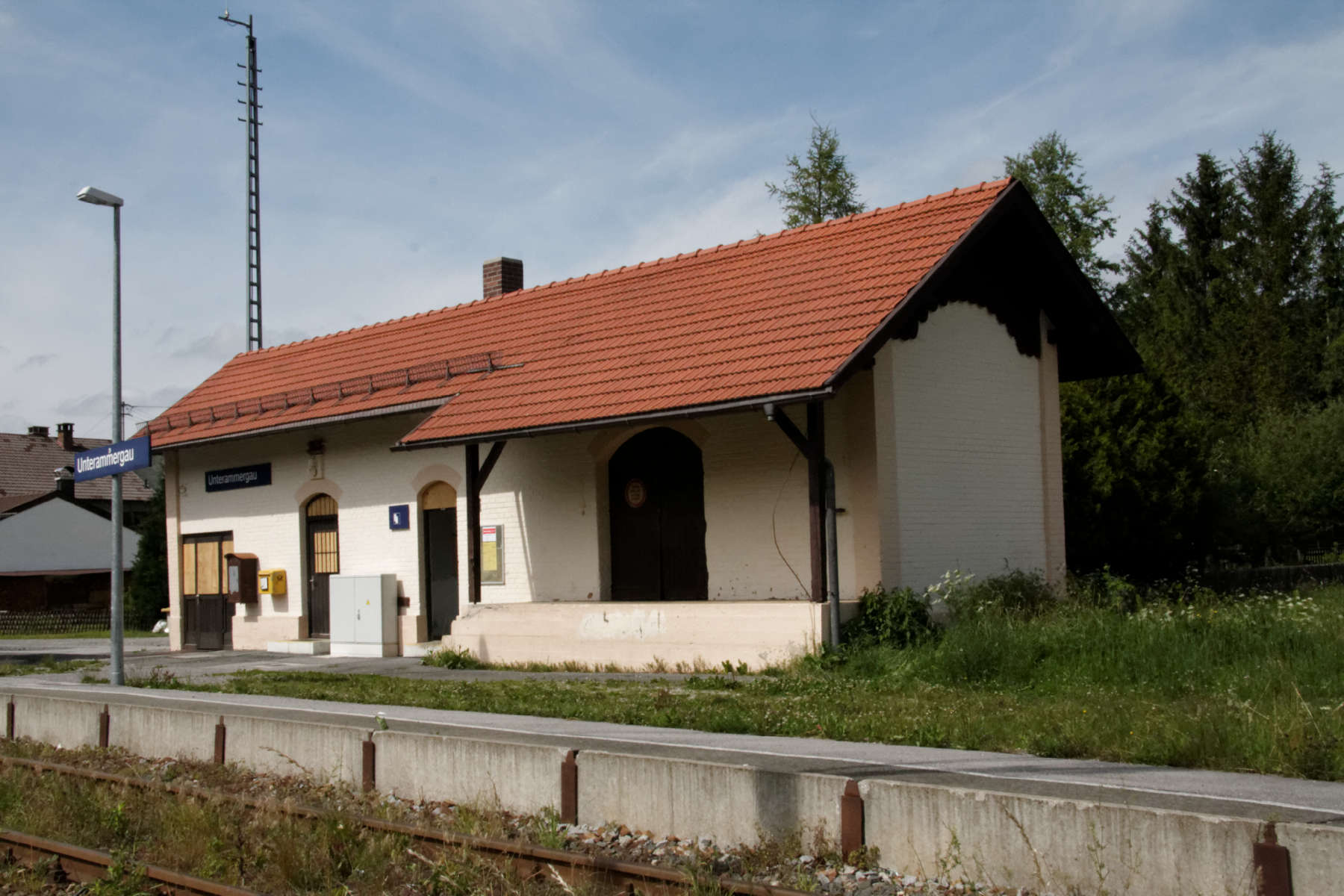
- The station in 2011

General information
- Location: Am Bahnhof 2 Unterammergau, Bavaria; Germany
- Coordinates: 47°37′03″N 11°01′48″E
- Elevation: 830 m (2,720 ft)
- Owner: DB InfraGO
- Operator: DB InfraGO
- Lines: Ammergau Railway (KBS 963)
- Distance: 20.4 km (12.7 mi) from Murnau
- Platforms: 1 side platform
- Tracks: 1
- Train operators: DB Regio Bayern
- Connections: Regionalverkehr Oberbayern buses

Other information
- Station code: 6341
- DS100 code: MUAG
- IBNR: 8005975
- Category: 7

Services
Preceding station	DB Regio Bayern	Following station
Oberammergau Terminus	RB 63	Altenau (Bay) towards Murnau
Location

Unterammergau station (German: Haltepunkt Unterammergau) is a railway station in the municipality of Unterammergau, in Bavaria, Germany. It is located on the Ammergau Railway of Deutsche Bahn.

== Services ==
As of the December 2021 timetable change, the following services stop at Unterammergau:

- RB: hourly service between Oberammergau and Murnau.
