= Murnau Ort station =

Railway station in Murnau am Staffelsee, Germany

Murnau Ort
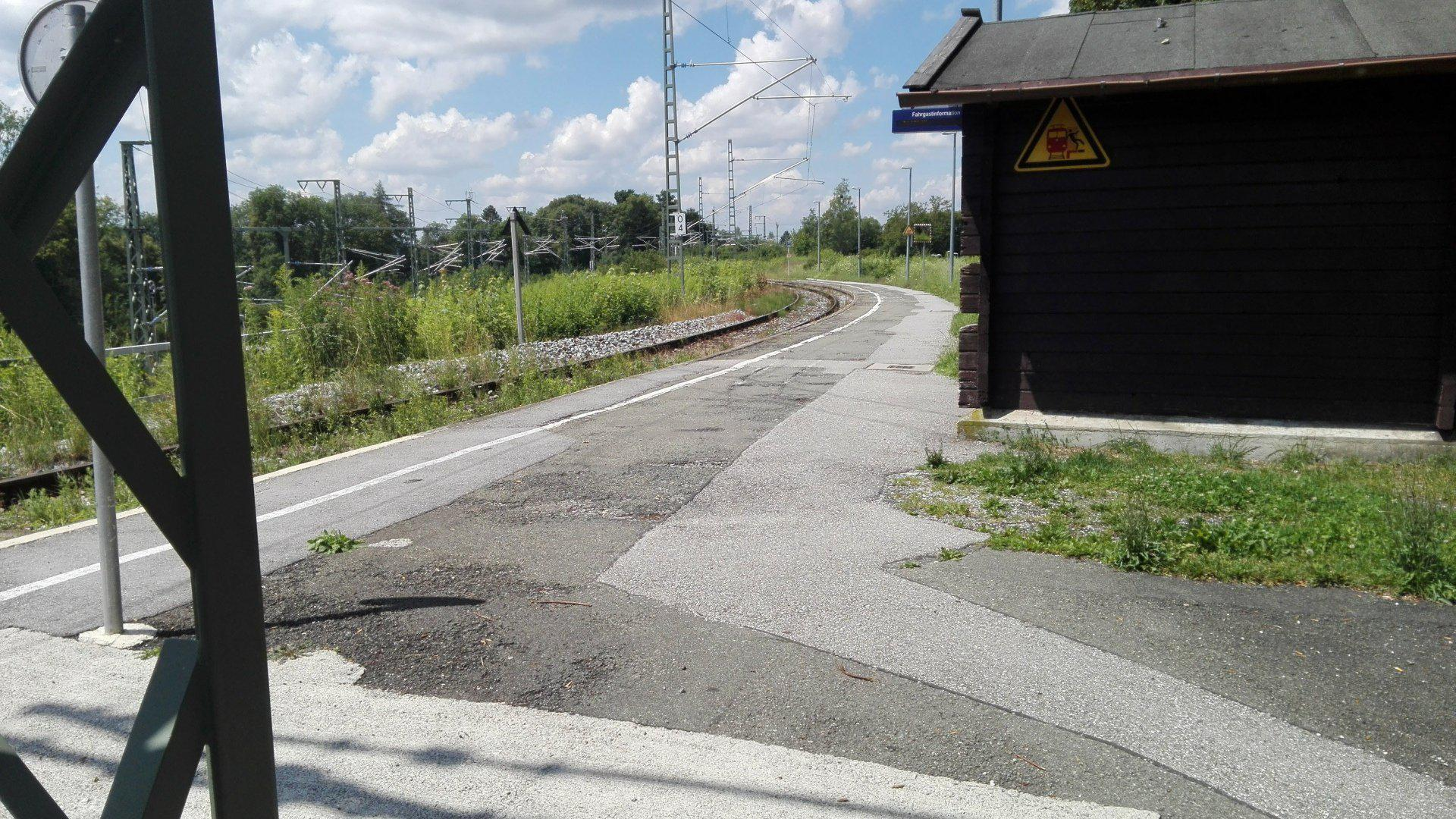
- The station platform in 2018

General information
- Location: Kellestraße 1 Murnau am Staffelsee, Bavaria; Germany
- Coordinates: 47°40′43″N 11°11′45″E
- Owner: DB Netz
- Operator: DB Station&Service
- Lines: Ammergau Railway (KBS 963)
- Distance: 0.4 km (0.25 mi) from Murnau
- Platforms: 1 side platform
- Tracks: 1
- Train operators: DB Regio Bayern

Other information
- Station code: 4285
- DS100 code: MUO
- IBNR: 8004186
- Category: 7

Services
Preceding station	DB Regio Bayern	Following station
Seeleiten-Berggeist towards Oberammergau	RB 63	Murnau Terminus
Location

Murnau Ort station (German: Haltepunkt Murnau Ort) is a railway station in the municipality of Murnau am Staffelsee, in Bavaria, Germany. It is located on the Ammergau Railway of Deutsche Bahn. The double-tracked Munich–Garmisch-Partenkirchen railway passes underneath directly west of the station platform.

== Services ==
As of the December 2021 timetable change, the following services stop at Murnau Ort:

- RB: hourly service between Oberammergau and Murnau.
