= Kay Blankenburg =

German politician

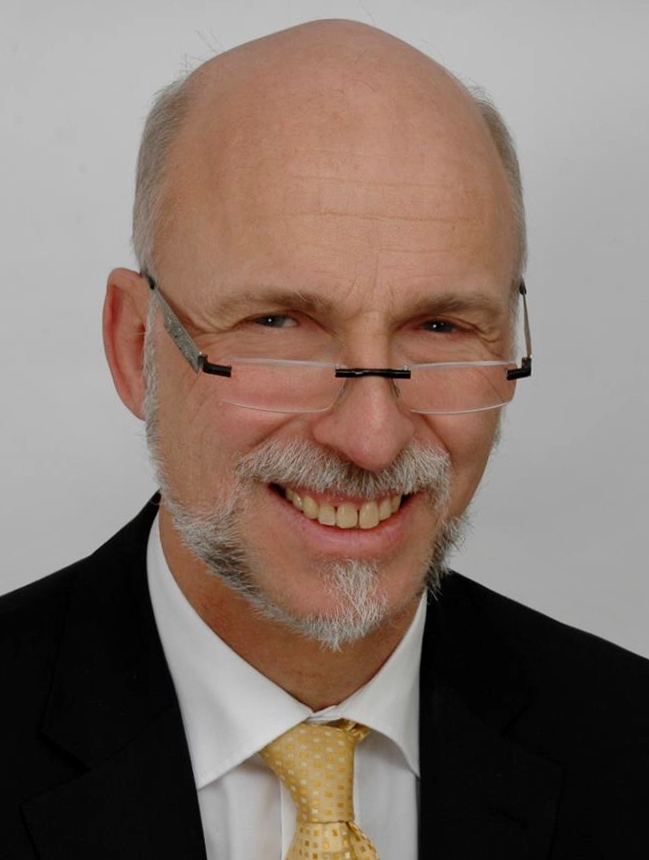
Kay Blankenburg (2013)

Kay Blankenburg (born 2 December 1957, in Bamberg, Germany) is a German lawyer and local politician of the SPD. He was lord mayor of Bad Kissingen from 2008 to 2020.

== Career ==
After graduating in 1977 in Bamberg, and the military service in Murnau and Ingolstadt, Blankenburg studied law at the University of Würzburg. In 1986 he completed the first and, after the clerkship in Oberlandesgericht, Bamburg, in 1989 the second legal state exam. Then he settled in Bad Kissingen. Between 1990 and 1996, he was a lecturer in adult education. Since 1999, he has been appointed a lecturer in the training of junior lawyers by the Bavarian Ministry of Justice.

In the local elections in 1996, Blankenburg first became known to the city council of Bad Kissingen. In March 2008, he was elected lord mayor (in German: Oberbürgermeister) and in March 2014, he won his re-election for another six years with 68.3 percent of the votes against his challenger of the CSU. In 2020 he didn't run again in the election.
