= Bad Kohlgrub =

- Municipality
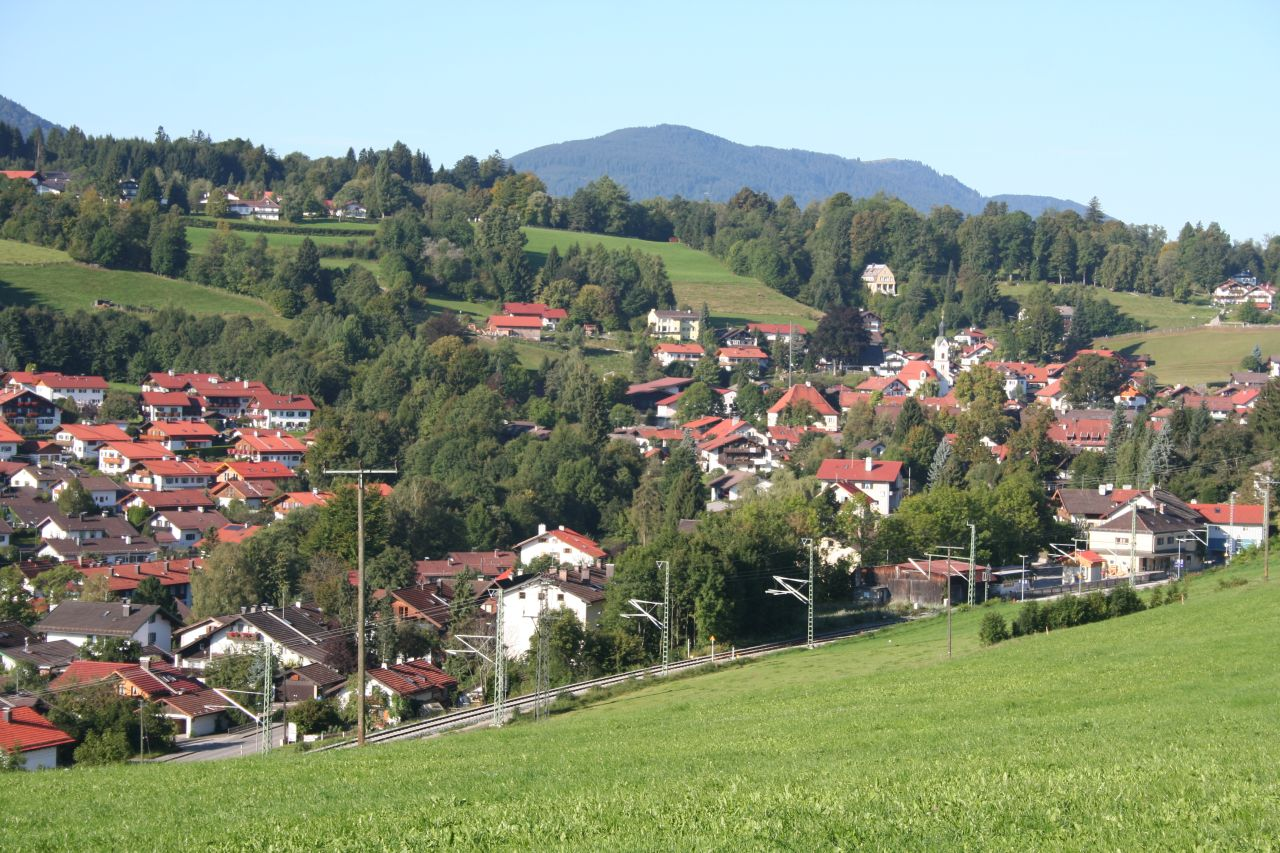
- Bad Kohlgrub from the northeast

- Coat of arms

- Location of Bad Kohlgrub within Garmisch-Partenkirchen district
- Interactive map of Bad Kohlgrub
- Location within Germany Location within Bavaria
- Coordinates: 47°40′N 11°03′E
- Country: Germany
- State: Bavaria
- Admin. region: Oberbayern
- District: Garmisch-Partenkirchen

Government
  - Mayor (2018–24): Franz Degele (FW)

Area
  - Total: 32.66 km^{2} (12.61 sq mi)
- Elevation: 828 m (2,717 ft)

Population (2025-12-31)
  - Total: 2,898
  - Density: 88.73/km^{2} (229.8/sq mi)
- Time zone: UTC+01:00 (CET)
  - Summer (DST): UTC+02:00 (CEST)
- Postal codes: 82433
- Dialling codes: 08845
- Vehicle registration: GAP
- Website: www.bad-kohlgrub.de

Bad Kohlgrub is a German municipality in the district of Garmisch-Partenkirchen, in Bavaria. It lies 12 kilometres (7.5 mi) west of Murnau am Staffelsee and 8 kilometres (5.0 mi) north of Oberammergau, and is connected to both by the Ammergau Railway.

Skiing facilities include 4 ski lifts, 4 pistes and 30 kilometres (19 mi) of cross-country skiing trails. A chairlift (opened 1954) south of the town leads up to the Hörnlehütte below the summit of the Hörnle mountain (1,547 metres/5,075 ft).

== Geography ==
The municipality is located in the Oberland region at an elevation of 800–900 meters above sea level, at the foot of the Hörnle, part of the Ammergau Alps. Approximately eight kilometers east of the town lie the Staffelsee lake and the Murnauer Moos peatland. The municipality includes numerous hamlets. It is situated within the Ammergau Alps Nature Park.

== History ==
Pre-Municipality Era

Until 1803, Bad Kohlgrub was alternately under the jurisdiction of Ettal Monastery and Rottenbuch Monastery, though it effectively formed its own Hofmark Kohlgrub (a type of manorial estate). Ettal Monastery also exercised high judicial authority over the Hofmark. During administrative reforms in the Kingdom of Bavaria, the modern municipality was established in 1818 under the Municipal Edict, belonging to the Schongau Regional Court.

The town’s name originates from historic charcoal-burning activities (Köhlertätigkeit), referring to the production of charcoal in kilns.

In 1663, only two families survived a plague outbreak. They vowed to build a church if spared, resulting in the Rochuskirche (St. Rochus Church), named after the patron saint of plague victims. The church, located north of the town on a hill, was expanded in Baroque style in 1733. Similar vows led to traditions like the Oberammergau Passion Play.

19th Century

The town first gained recognition as a spa ("Bad") in 1871 when a facility centered around ferruginous mineral springs (Stahlquellen) was established in the Gagers district. After these springs dried up, the town shifted to promoting its moorland’s therapeutic properties. Locals had long recognized the healing effects of the surrounding high moor for ailments like gout, sciatica, and women’s health issues.

20th Century

In 1913, the municipality was transferred from the Schongau administrative district to the Garmisch district. The town officially received the title "Bad" (spa) in its name on July 13, 1948.

Population Growth

Between 1988 and 2018, the population grew from 1,986 to 2,841—an increase of 855 residents (43.1%), the highest percentage growth in the district during this period. The town has become an attractive residential area for young families due to its robust infrastructure, including childcare facilities, a primary and secondary school, sports and recreational opportunities, and active community organizations.

== Transport ==
The municipality has two railway stations, Bad Kohlgrub and Bad Kohlgrub Kurhaus, on the Ammergau Railway.
