= Unterammergau (Verwaltungsgemeinschaft) =

- Verwaltungsgemeinschaft
- Location of Unterammergau within Garmisch-Partenkirchen district
- Interactive map of Unterammergau
- Location within Germany Location within Bavaria
- Coordinates: 47°37′N 11°02′E
- Country: Germany
- State: Bavaria
- Admin. region: Upper Bavaria
- District: Garmisch-Partenkirchen
- Seat: Unterammergau
- Subdivisions: 2 municipalities

Area
  - Total: 44.67 km^{2} (17.25 sq mi)

Population (2025-12-31)
  - Total: 2,443
  - Density: 54.69/km^{2} (141.6/sq mi)
- Time zone: UTC+01:00 (CET)
  - Summer (DST): UTC+02:00 (CEST)

Unterammergau is a Verwaltungsgemeinschaft (municipal association) in the district of Garmisch-Partenkirchen in Bavaria, Germany. Its seat is in Unterammergau.

It consists of the following municipalities:

1. Ettal
2. Unterammergau
