= Saulgrub =

- Municipality
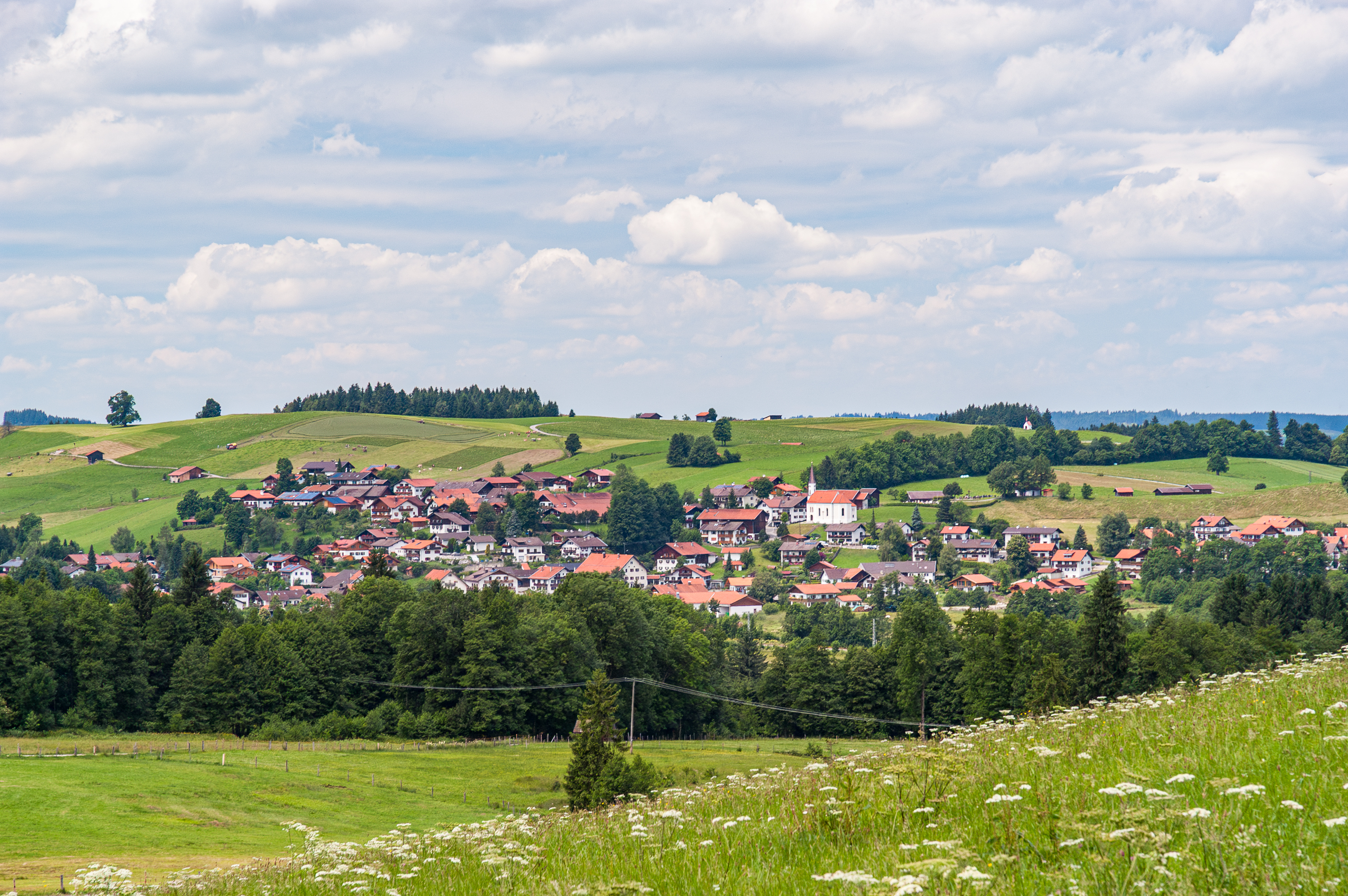
- General view of Saulgrub

- Coat of arms

- Location of Saulgrub within Garmisch-Partenkirchen district
- Interactive map of Saulgrub
- Location within Germany Location within Bavaria
- Coordinates: 47°40′N 11°2′E
- Country: Germany
- State: Bavaria
- Admin. region: Oberbayern
- District: Garmisch-Partenkirchen
- Municipal assoc.: Saulgrub

Government
  - Mayor (2020–26): Rupert Speer

Area
  - Total: 35.49 km^{2} (13.70 sq mi)
- Elevation: 859 m (2,818 ft)

Population (2025-12-31)
  - Total: 1,632
  - Density: 45.98/km^{2} (119.1/sq mi)
- Time zone: UTC+01:00 (CET)
  - Summer (DST): UTC+02:00 (CEST)
- Postal codes: 82442
- Dialling codes: 08845
- Vehicle registration: GAP
- Website: gemeinde-saulgrub.de

Saulgrub is a municipality in the district of Garmisch-Partenkirchen, in Bavaria, Germany.

== Transport ==
The municipality has two railway stations, Altenau (Bay) and Saulgrub, on the Ammergau Railway.
