= Saulgrub (Verwaltungsgemeinschaft) =

- Verwaltungsgemeinschaft
- Location of Saulgrub within Garmisch-Partenkirchen district
- Interactive map of Saulgrub
- Location within Germany Location within Bavaria
- Coordinates: 47°40′N 11°01′E
- Country: Germany
- State: Bavaria
- Admin. region: Upper Bavaria
- District: Garmisch-Partenkirchen
- Seat: Saulgrub
- Subdivisions: 2 municipalities

Area
  - Total: 53.13 km^{2} (20.51 sq mi)

Population (2025-12-31)
  - Total: 2,943
  - Density: 55.39/km^{2} (143.5/sq mi)
- Time zone: UTC+01:00 (CET)
  - Summer (DST): UTC+02:00 (CEST)

Saulgrub is a Verwaltungsgemeinschaft (municipal association) in the district of Garmisch-Partenkirchen in Bavaria, Germany. Its seat is in Saulgrub.

It consists of the following municipalities:

1. Bad Bayersoien
2. Saulgrub
