= Unterammergau =

- Municipality
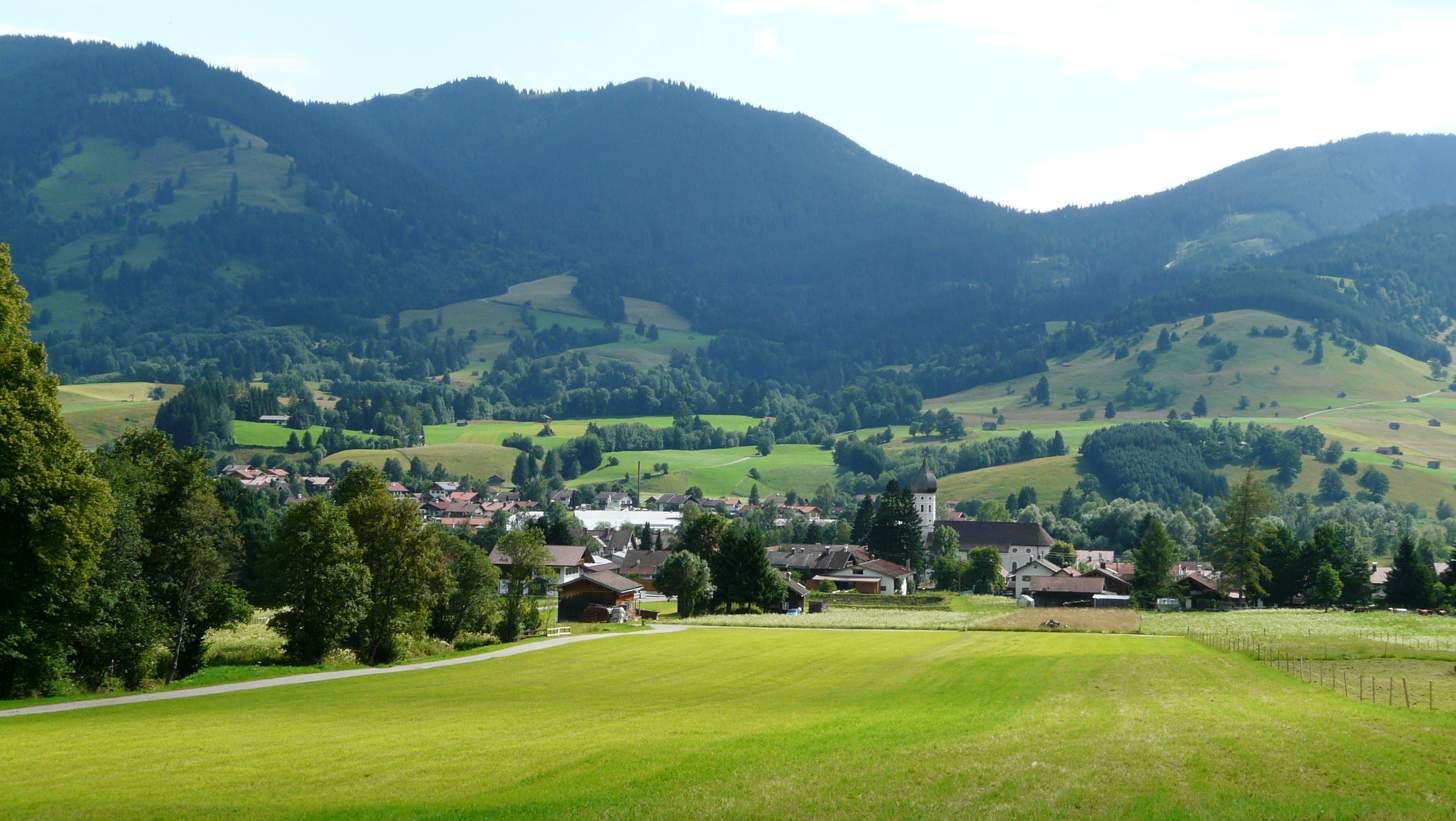
- Unterammergau seen from the west

- Coat of arms

- Location of Unterammergau within Garmisch-Partenkirchen district
- Interactive map of Unterammergau
- Location within Germany Location within Bavaria
- Coordinates: 47°36.9′N 11°1.7′E
- Country: Germany
- State: Bavaria
- Admin. region: Oberbayern
- District: Garmisch-Partenkirchen
- Municipal assoc.: Unterammergau

Government
  - Mayor (2020–26): Robert Stumpfecker

Area
  - Total: 29.90 km^{2} (11.54 sq mi)
- Elevation: 836 m (2,743 ft)

Population (2025-12-31)
  - Total: 1,759
  - Density: 58.83/km^{2} (152.4/sq mi)
- Time zone: UTC+01:00 (CET)
  - Summer (DST): UTC+02:00 (CEST)
- Postal codes: 82497
- Dialling codes: 08822
- Vehicle registration: GAP
- Website: www.unterammergau.de

Unterammergau is a municipality in the district of Garmisch-Partenkirchen, in Bavaria, Germany. It is the site of the 11th-century Chapel of St Leonhard, patron saint of horses, which is the terminus of the annual Leonhardritt and Blessing of the Animals.

== Transport ==
The municipality has a railway station, Unterammergau, on the Ammergau Railway.

== See also ==
- Oberammergau
