= Bad Bayersoien =

Place in Bavaria, Germany

- Municipality
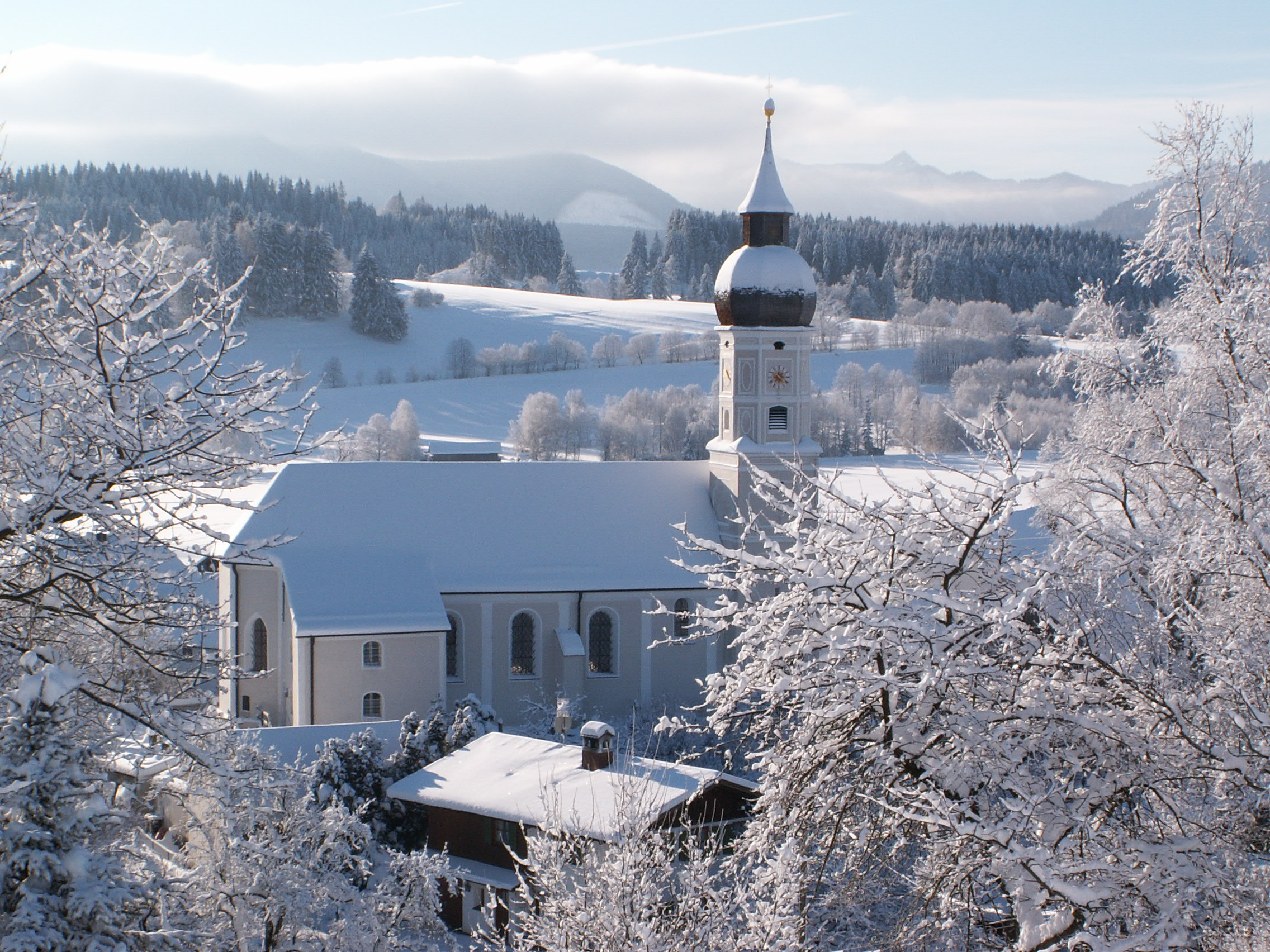
- Saint George Church in winter

- Coat of arms

- Location of Bad Bayersoien within Garmisch-Partenkirchen district
- Interactive map of Bad Bayersoien
- Location within Germany Location within Bavaria
- Coordinates: 47°41′N 11°00′E
- Country: Germany
- State: Bavaria
- Admin. region: Oberbayern
- District: Garmisch-Partenkirchen
- Municipal assoc.: Saulgrub

Government
  - Mayor (2020–26): Gisela Kieweg (Ind.)

Area
  - Total: 17.65 km^{2} (6.81 sq mi)
- Elevation: 812 m (2,664 ft)

Population (2025-12-31)
  - Total: 1,311
  - Density: 74.28/km^{2} (192.4/sq mi)
- Time zone: UTC+01:00 (CET)
  - Summer (DST): UTC+02:00 (CEST)
- Postal codes: 82435
- Dialling codes: 08845
- Vehicle registration: GAP
- Website: www.bad-bayersoien.de

Bad Bayersoien is a German municipality in the district of Garmisch-Partenkirchen, in Bavaria.

In August 2023, it made international headlines when a hailstorm destroyed roof tiles, pierced roof-mounted solar panels and cars were dented from golf ball sized hail due to a supercell event.

== Gallery ==
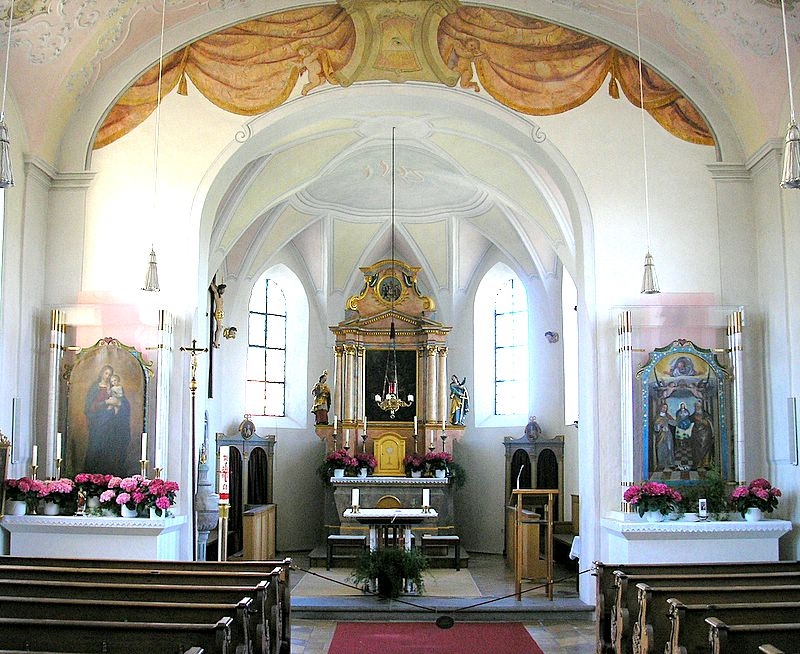
Gothic Altar of Saint George's church

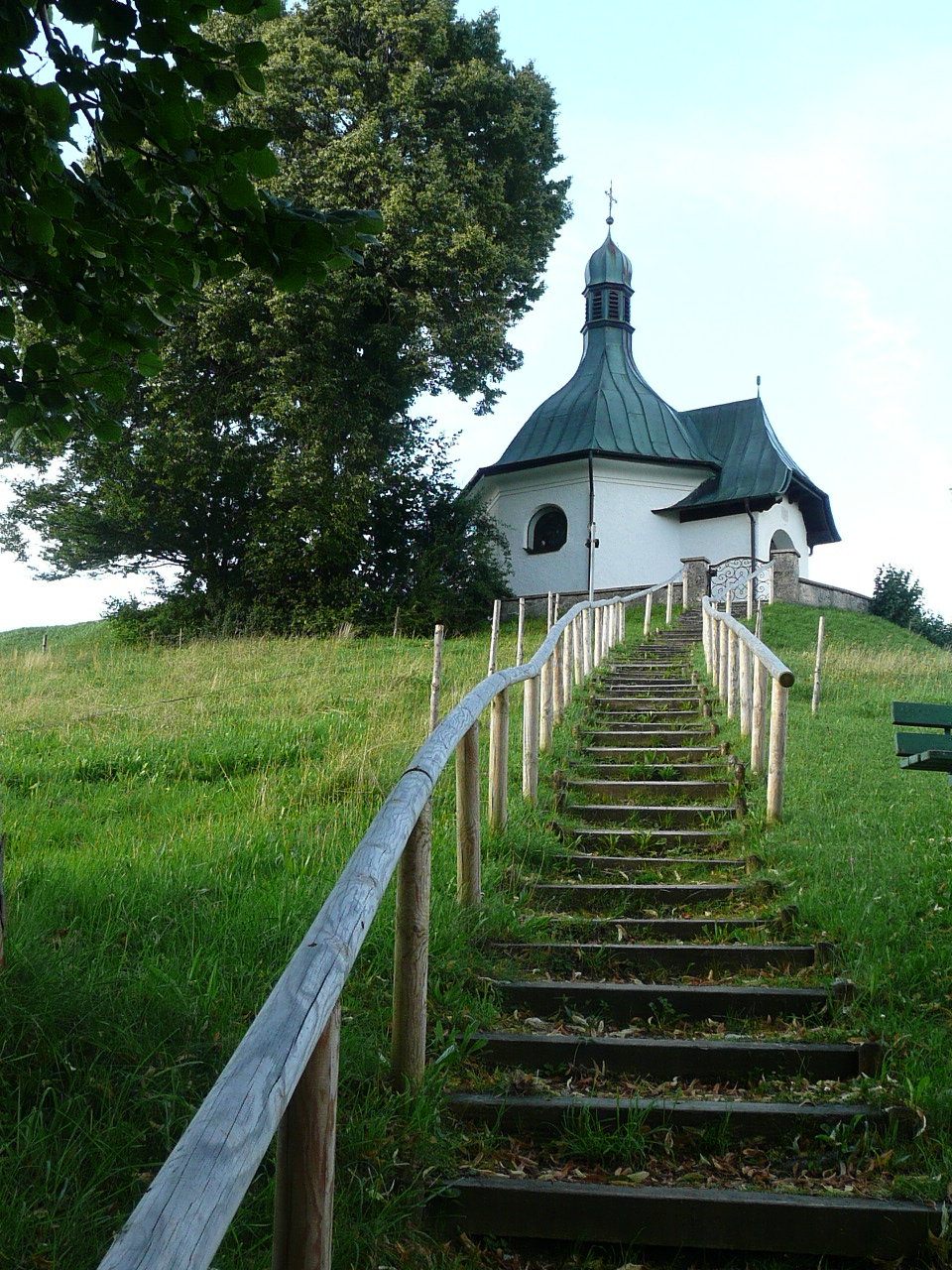
Chapel

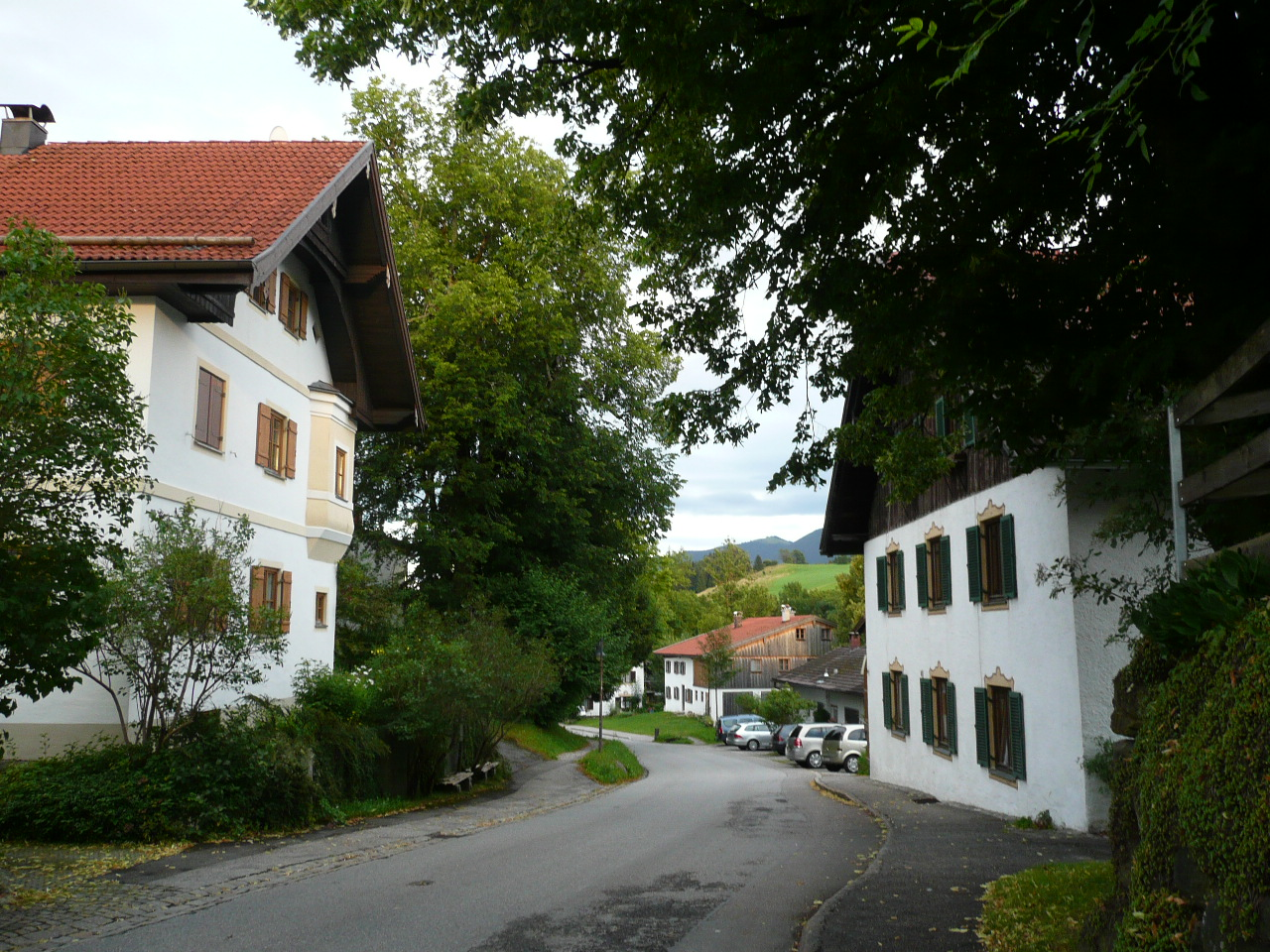
Houses
