= Schwaigen =

- Municipality
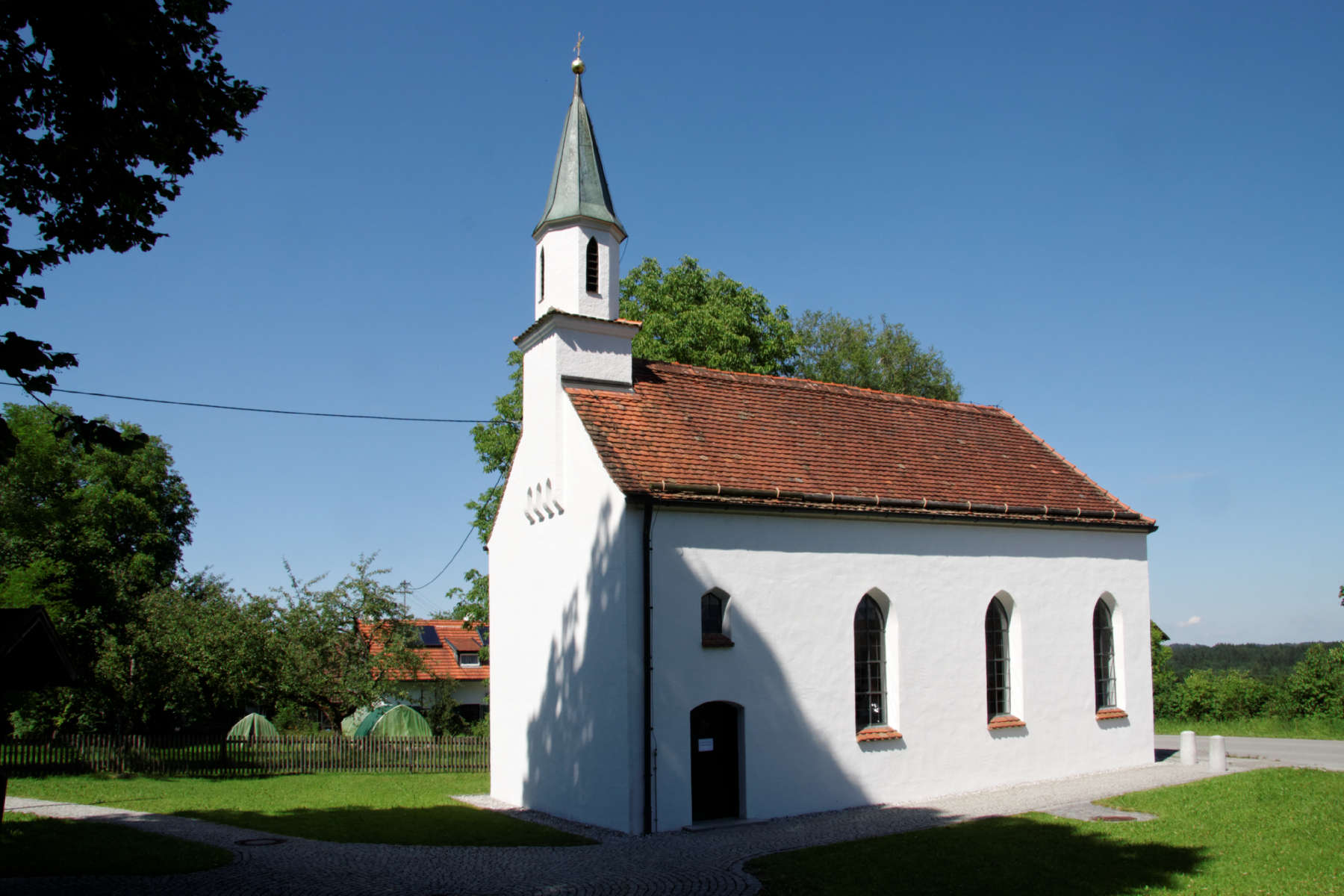
- Church of Saint Wolfgang in Grafenaschau

- Coat of arms

- Location of Schwaigen within Garmisch-Partenkirchen district
- Interactive map of Schwaigen
- Location within Germany Location within Bavaria
- Coordinates: 47°37′N 11°9′E
- Country: Germany
- State: Bavaria
- Admin. region: Oberbayern
- District: Garmisch-Partenkirchen
- Municipal assoc.: Ohlstadt

Government
  - Mayor (2020–26): Hubert Mangold

Area
  - Total: 23.58 km^{2} (9.10 sq mi)
- Elevation: 656 m (2,152 ft)

Population (2025-12-31)
  - Total: 603
  - Density: 25.6/km^{2} (66.2/sq mi)
- Time zone: UTC+01:00 (CET)
  - Summer (DST): UTC+02:00 (CEST)
- Postal codes: 82445
- Dialling codes: 08841
- Vehicle registration: GAP
- Website: www.schwaigen.de

Schwaigen is a municipality in the district of Garmisch-Partenkirchen, in Bavaria, Germany.
