= Garmisch-Partenkirchen (district) =

Coordinates: 47°35′N 11°10′E

- District
- Flag Coat of arms
- Country: Germany
- State: Bavaria
- Adm. region: Upper Bavaria
- Capital: Garmisch-Partenkirchen

Government
  - District admin.: Anton Speer (FW)

Area
  - Total: 1,012 km^{2} (391 sq mi)

Population (31 December 2025)
  - Total: 89,350
  - Density: 88.29/km^{2} (228.7/sq mi)
- Time zone: UTC+01:00 (CET)
  - Summer (DST): UTC+02:00 (CEST)
- Vehicle registration: GAP
- Website: landratsamt-gap.de

Garmisch-Partenkirchen (Bavarian: Garmasch-Partakurch) is a Landkreis (district) in Bavaria, Germany. It is bounded by (from the west and clockwise) the districts of Ostallgäu, Weilheim-Schongau and Bad Tölz-Wolfratshausen, and by the Austrian state of Tyrol.

== History ==
In medieval times the alpine lands were owned by the bishops of Freising and the abbots of Ettal Abbey. In 1803, when the clerical states of Germany were dissolved, the region was acquired by Bavaria.

== Geography ==
The district is located in the Bavarian Alps and includes the highest mountain of Germany, the Zugspitze (2,962 m). The highest peaks are grouped along the Austrian border, where the mountain ridges of the Wettersteingebirge and the Karwendelgebirge rise. Between them the Isar river runs northwards. North of these ridges is a valley housing the tourist resort of Garmisch-Partenkirchen. The valley together with the surrounding mountains is called the Werdenfelser Land. Further north the ridges of the Ammergebirge and the Estergebirge rise, which are still over 2000 m high. In the northernmost parts of the district there is alpine uplands (about 600 m high). Here the Staffelsee is located, a lake of 8 km^{2}.

== Coat of arms ==
The coat of arms displays:

- a lion with the head of a griffin, being the symbol of Steingaden Abbey
- a portrait of a moor, often used in European coats of arms (https://blackcentraleurope.com/sources/1000-1500/moors-on-crests/
- the white and blue checked pattern of Bavaria

== Towns and municipalities ==
Clickable map of towns and municipalities in the district

The district includes no towns. All places have the status of municipalities, of which three have the status of Markt ("market municipality"). Several municipalities cooperate in a Verwaltungsgemeinschaft.

Märkte
1. Garmisch-Partenkirchen
2. Mittenwald
3. Murnau am Staffelsee
Municipalities
1. Bad Kohlgrub
2. Farchant
3. Grainau
4. Krün

5. Oberammergau
6. Oberau
7. Uffing
8. Wallgau

Verwaltungsgemeinschaften
| 1. Ohlstadt; 1. Eschenlohe; 2. Großweil; 3. Ohlstadt^{1}; 4. Schwaigen | 2. Saulgrub; 1. Bad Bayersoien; 2. Saulgrub^{1} | 3. Seehausen am Staffelsee; 1. Riegsee; 2. Seehausen am Staffelsee^{1}; 3. Spatzenhausen | 4. Unterammergau; 1. Ettal; 2. Unterammergau^{1} |
^{1}seat of the Verwaltungsgemeinschaft
