= Murnau am Staffelsee =

Murnau
- Municipality
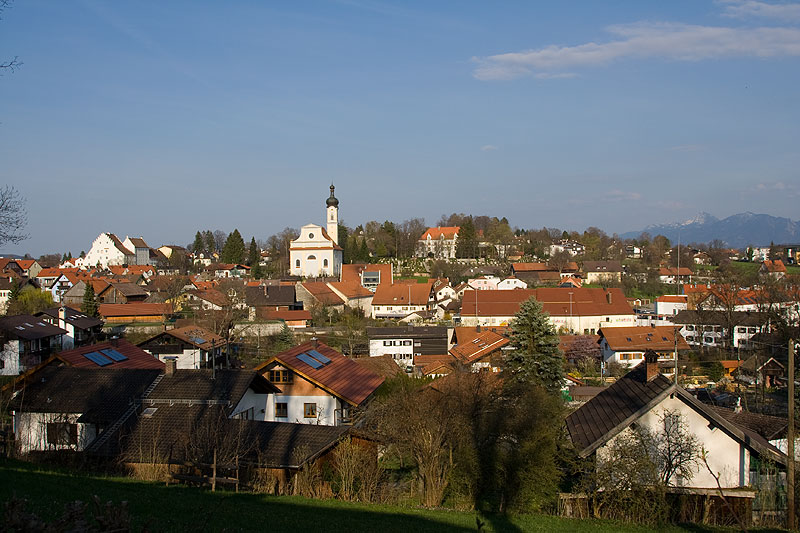
- Murnau in 2007

- Coat of arms

- Location of Murnau within Garmisch-Partenkirchen district
- Interactive map of Murnau
- Location within Germany Location within Bavaria
- Coordinates: 47°41′N 11°12′E
- Country: Germany
- State: Bavaria
- Admin. region: Oberbayern
- District: Garmisch-Partenkirchen

Government
  - Mayor (2020–26): Rolf Beuting (ÖDP)
  - Governing parties: ÖDP/ Bürgerforum Murnau

Area
  - Total: 38.05 km^{2} (14.69 sq mi)
- Elevation: 650–730 m (2,130–2,400 ft)

Population (2025-12-31)
  - Total: 12,057
  - Density: 316.9/km^{2} (820.7/sq mi)
- Time zone: UTC+01:00 (CET)
  - Summer (DST): UTC+02:00 (CEST)
- Postal codes: 82418
- Dialling codes: 0 8841
- Vehicle registration: GAP
- Website: www.murnau.de

Murnau am Staffelsee (often shortened to Murnau) is a market town in the district of Garmisch-Partenkirchen, in the Oberbayern region of Bavaria, Germany.

The market originated in the 12th century around Murnau Castle. Murnau is on the edge of the Bavarian Alps, about 70 kilometres (43 mi) south of Munich. Directly to its west is the Staffelsee lake and to the south are the peaks and ridges of the Ammergau Alps beginning with the Hörnle and extending up to the Ettaler Manndl, southwest of the Wetterstein. This mountain range is formed by the Zugspitze and the Alpspitze in the south as well as the Estergebirge with their striking Kistenkar and the Walchensee mountains including Heimgarten and Herzogstand in the southeast. To the south is the largest continuous wetland of its kind in Central Europe.

== History ==
The area around Murnau was already settled in pre-Christian times. From the reign of Septimius Severus, a Roman road called Via Raetia led above the Brenner Pass and Seefeld Saddle through the upper Isar-Loisachtal valleys all the way to Augsburg. The road continued under the name Via Imperii as an imperial road and trade route until the 19th century. Signs of Celtic and Roman settlements have been found on the now-eroded moss area around the Moosberg in the Murnauer Moos. At that time Murnau was no more than a stopping-off point for travellers, called Murau or Mureau. The name Murnau comes from Mure ("mudslide") and Aue ("meadow"), referring to the Murnauer Moos and Loisachtal.

=== Middle Ages ===
Murnau was first documented in 1150. The first official mention of the church of Saint Nicholas was in a document of 1300, and the castle (Schlossmuseum) is first mentioned in 1324. In 1350 Louis V, Duke of Bavaria granted Murnau the Blutbann (the right of high justice), the Niederlagerecht (the staple right), and the right to hold a market weekly on Wednesdays and at Michaelmas. It retains the title of "Markt" ("market") to this day.

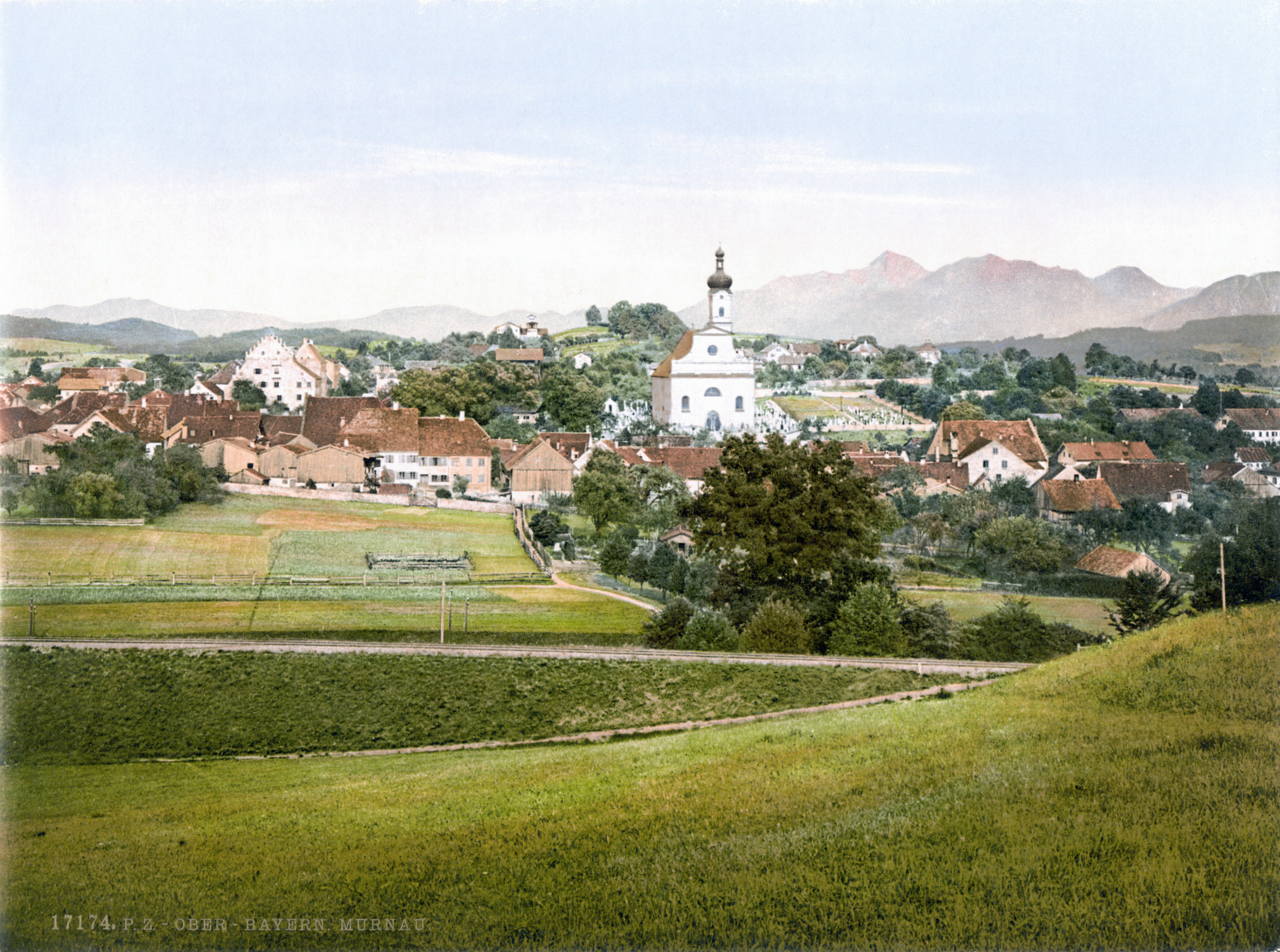
Murnau, ca. 1900

=== Modern era ===
From 1632 to 1648, Murnau was occupied by Swedish and French troops during the Thirty Years' War. Plague broke out in 1634. The church of Saint Nikolaus was rebuilt between 1717 and 1734. In 1722 the town was granted the right to hold the Leonhardimarkt and Skapuliermarkt fairs.

In 1803 the Ettal Abbey was dissolved, the office of Pfleger was abolished and Murnau was assigned to the district court of Weilheim. The town suffered a major fire in 1835 and subsequently was almost completely rebuilt, leading to the enclosed townscape seen today. In 1879 the Weilheim to Murnau railway opened. Ten years later in 1889 the connection to Garmisch opened, followed by the line to Oberammergau in 1900.

=== 20th century ===
In 1908 two pairs of artists (Gabriele Münter and Vassily Kandinsky; and Marianne von Werefkin and Alexej Jawlensky) stayed in Murnau at the same time to paint together. Through their pictures of Murnau and its scenery, which they continued to paint until 1914, the market town became famous to a worldwide art audience. In the history of art, this period before the First World War is called the "Murnau Era".

This period is directly connected to these four artists and marks stylistically the development from expressionism to abstract art. Today, the Münter-Haus ("Russian House"), where Münter moved in 1909 with Kandinsky, is one of the most prominent cultural attractions of Murnau; as is also the Castle Museum with its art collection.

From 1923 to 1933 the author Ödön von Horváth lived and worked in Murnau; he was an opponent of the Nazis. In 1924 a private girls' high school (later a Gymnasium) was founded. A new hospital, founded by Dr. hc James Loeb, was built in 1932.

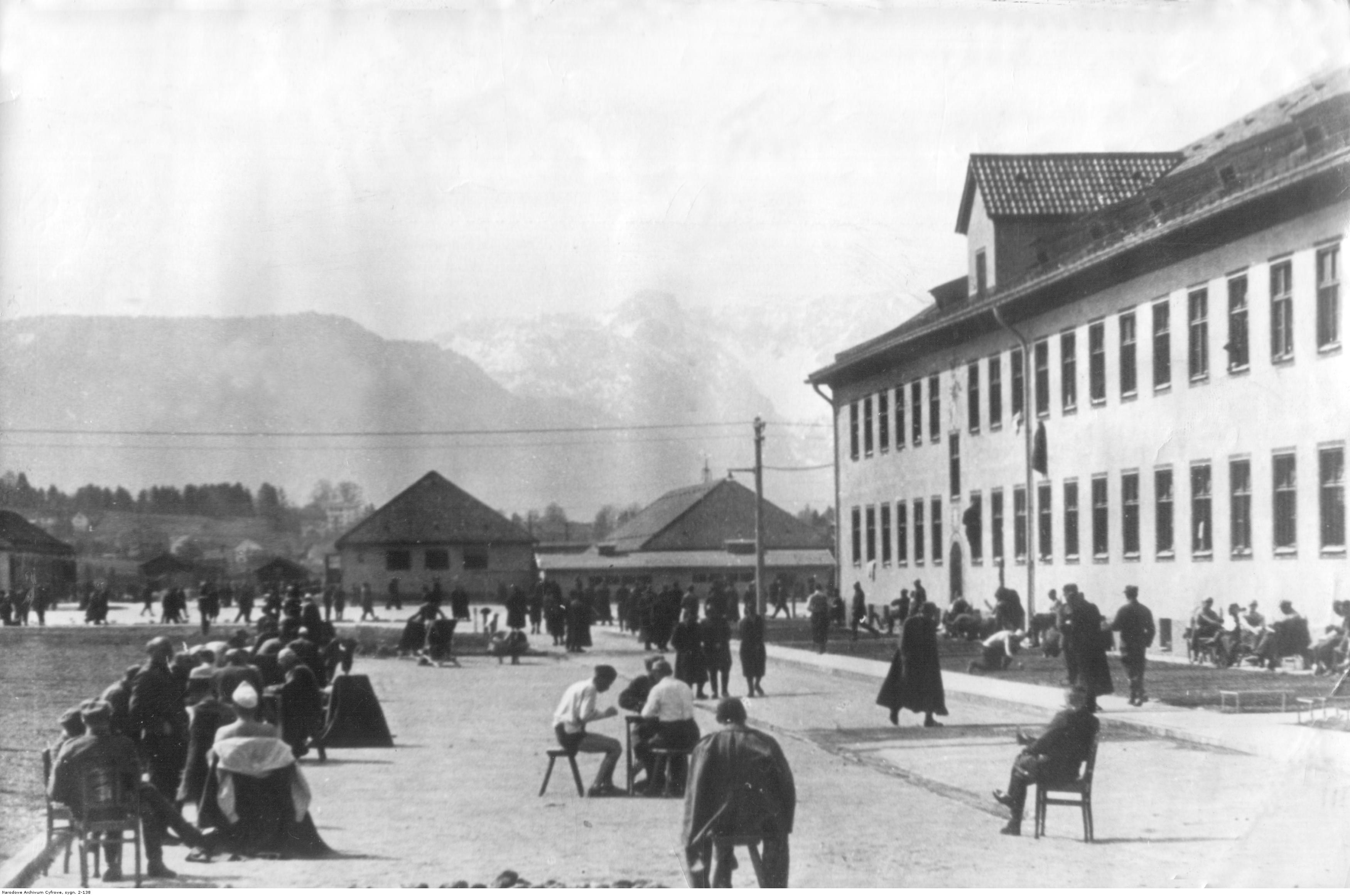
Oflag VII-A POW camp during World War II

Some citizens of Murnau took part in Hitler's putsch in Munich and received the Blood Order. During the Nazi era, Murnau received a garrison of mountain troops for the first time. During World War II, Polish officers were imprisoned in the Werdenfelser barracks, which housed the Oflag VII-A POW camp. In 1941, the Oflag 57 POW camp was established in Murnau, but was soon relocated to Ostrołęka in German-occupied Poland.

Christoph Probst was born and raised in Murnau. In Munich he joined the White Rose, an anti-Nazi group. The Gestapo arrested a few of its inner circle. Along with the Geschwister Scholl, the 23-years-old Probst was found guilty after a two-hour trial, and beheaded by guillotine the same day February 22, 1943.

After the Second World War, the town was part of West Germany. In 1953 the trade association's accident clinic opened in the southeast of the town, and has since been regularly expanded. The Goethe Institute opened its gates in 1954, and in 1956 and in 1971 the barracks were occupied by the army again. Numerous country houses, including some villas and a sports hall, which was built by Emanuel von Seidl, were demolished in the 1960s and 70s. The Staffelsee high school was extended to a full school in 1967. On 1 July 1972 Murnau was separated from the administrative district of Weilheim and transferred to that of Garmisch-Partenkirchen. On 12 March 1979 the name of the municipality of Murnau was officially changed to Murnau am Staffelsee.

In 1979 a youth centre was opened, and in 2006 it acquired its own building, the Erlhaus, named after its founder. In 1980 The Murnauer Moss became a nature reserve. In 1993 the Castle Museum opened. From 1998 to 2000 Murnau's historic centre underwent restoration. The redesigned Münterhaus reopened in 1999. In 2000 the pedestrian zone and the underground car park were inaugurated.

Murnau is also a garrison location for the German army: it was a location of the 22nd Mountain Infantry Brigade 22; from 1981 the 22nd Armoured Infantry Brigade, and later the 22nd Tank Brigade which was part of the 1st Mountain Infantry Division in Garmisch-Partenkirchen. On 21 March 1993 this association was dissolved. Since 1966 Murnau has also accommodated a distance registration battalion. First founded as the mountain distant registration company 8 (1956) in Mittenwald, the mountain distant registration battalion 8 (later renamed as Gebirgsfernmeldelehrbataillon 8, afterwards Gebirgsstabsfernmeldelehrbataillon 8) moved to Murnau, where it has been stationed until 31 March 1994 in the former Kemmel barracks (named after a mountain in Belgium).

On 1 April 1994 they moved to the substantially smaller but more modern Werdenfelser barracks on the northern edge of Murnau. Since the 1 January 1996 Murnau soldiers are represented regularly in international missions of the German army (IFOR, SFOR, EUFOR, FOX TERRIER TF, KFOR, ISAF). Initially, according to the structural plans of the army, the base Murnau should have been dissolved completely.

In the end, only the driving school company was disbanded. Since the publication of the stationing concept in November 2004 there is a stable structure for the Werdenfelser barracks. In addition the 5th company of the 451th military police battalion and the Murnau medical unit are stationed in the Werdenfelser barracks.

=== 21st century ===
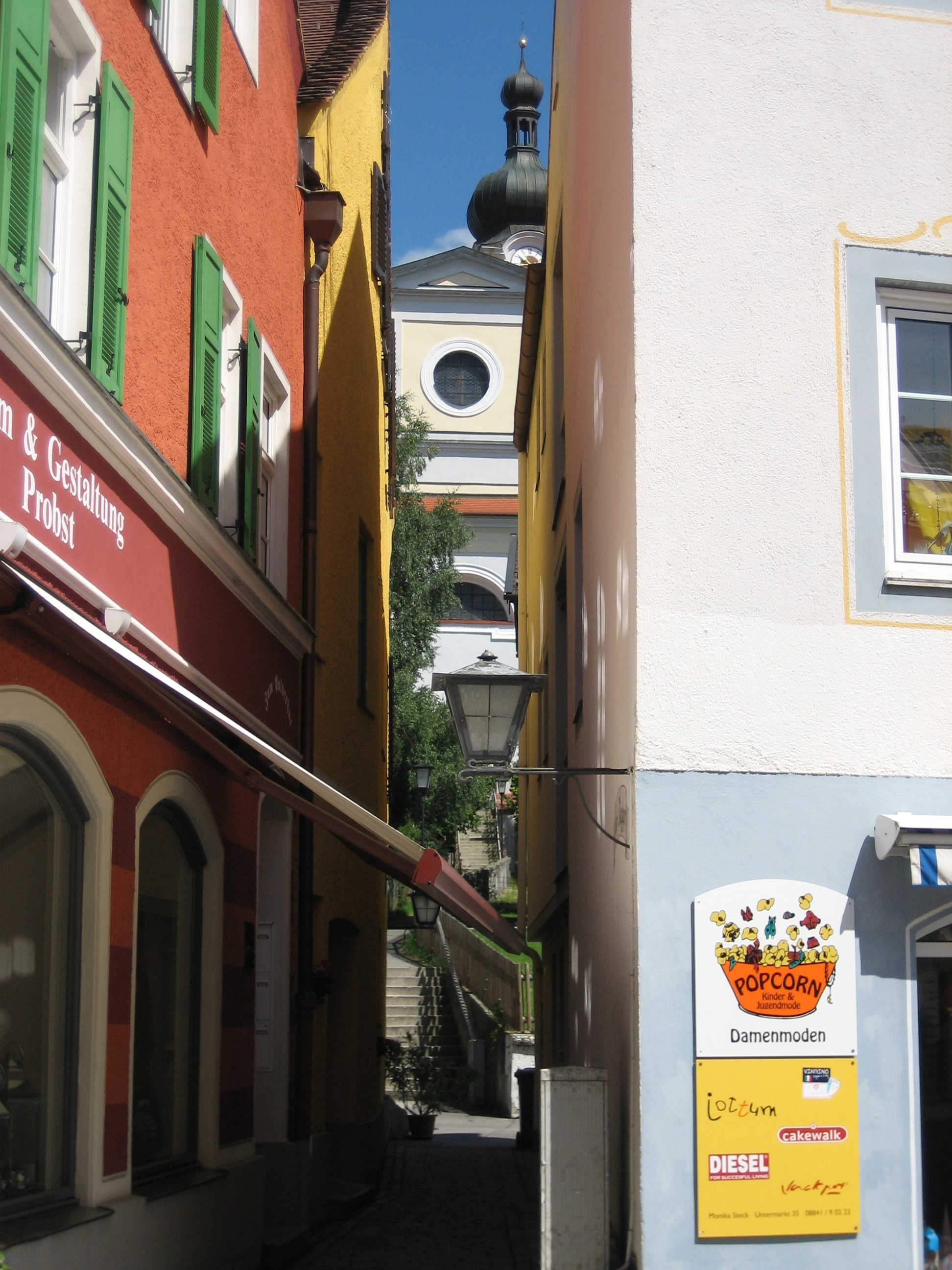
Colourful street in Murnau

In 2001 the new health resort park (Kurpark), the Münter-Platz and the new Staffelsee high school were inaugurated. In 2002 Murnau acquired the area of the former Kemmel barracks, which is now called Kemmelpark. Currently the area is being transformed into a trade park and residential park. In 2006 Goethe Institute closed and was demolished. Since autumn 2009 three semi-detached houses have been built on its site. Since 9 December 2008, the assembly hall of the Staffelsee high school bears the name of the writer Ödön von Horvath.

=== Incorporations ===
On 1 July 1974 the independent municipality Weindorf was integrated. In January 1978 parts of the municipalities called Riegsee and Seehausen were added. On 1 May 1978 the incorporation of the village Hechendorf forms the final point.

=== Residential development ===
Year	1840	1871	1900	1925	1939	1950	1961	1970	1987	2000	2005
Residents	1.565	1.735	2.436	3.223	5.189	6.474	7.366	8.233	9.913	11.671	12.048

=== Blazon ===
The coat of arms shows a green dragon with a red tongue and claws on silver background. Its body is turned to the right but its head is pointing backwards to the left. When the dragon first appears in the Murnauer blazon can't be said exactly. The first local seal turns up in 1374.

== Infrastructure ==
=== Transport ===
Murnau is a minor train hub, since Murnau station is the place where the Munich–Garmisch-Partenkirchen and the Oberammergau lines intersect. The first electrical signal box of the Deutsche Bundesbahn was installed here. The municipality has three other stations on the Oberammergau line: Murnau Ort, Seeleiten-Berggeist, and Grafenaschau. Also, the A95 motorway and the B 2 Bundesstrasse run through or near Murnau.

=== Schools ===
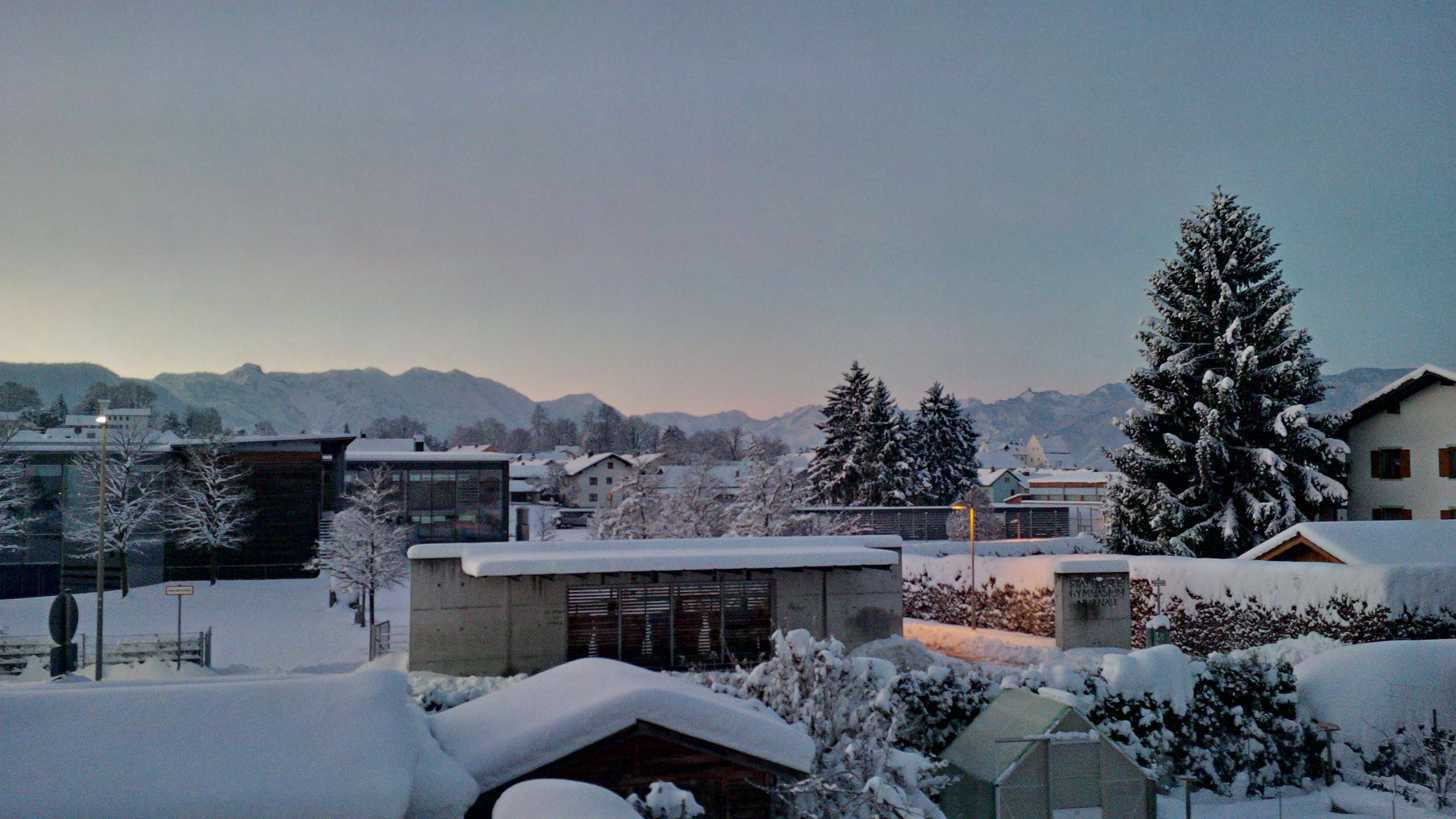
Staffelsee-Gymnasium

Murnau has two elementary schools, the "James-Loeb-Grundschule" and the "Emmanuel-von-Seidl-Schule", the gymnasium "Staffelsee-Gymnasium" and the general school "Mittelschule Murnau". The last one was originally planned to be a boys school but since 2013/14 it has accepted girls as well. In the beginning, the pupils have been accommodated in temporary containers. In the end of 2014 the first section was finished and the classes finally could move into the new schoolhouse. The investment sum was 21 million €. In 1964 the Camerloher music school Murnau was founded.

=== Hospitals ===
Murnau has two hospitals: the Berufsgenossenschaftliche Unfallklinik, an emergency and accident hospital specializing in trauma surgery, and the clinic Hohenried, a professional clinic for children. Murnau is also used as a health resort by many guests and cure patients.

== Notable people ==
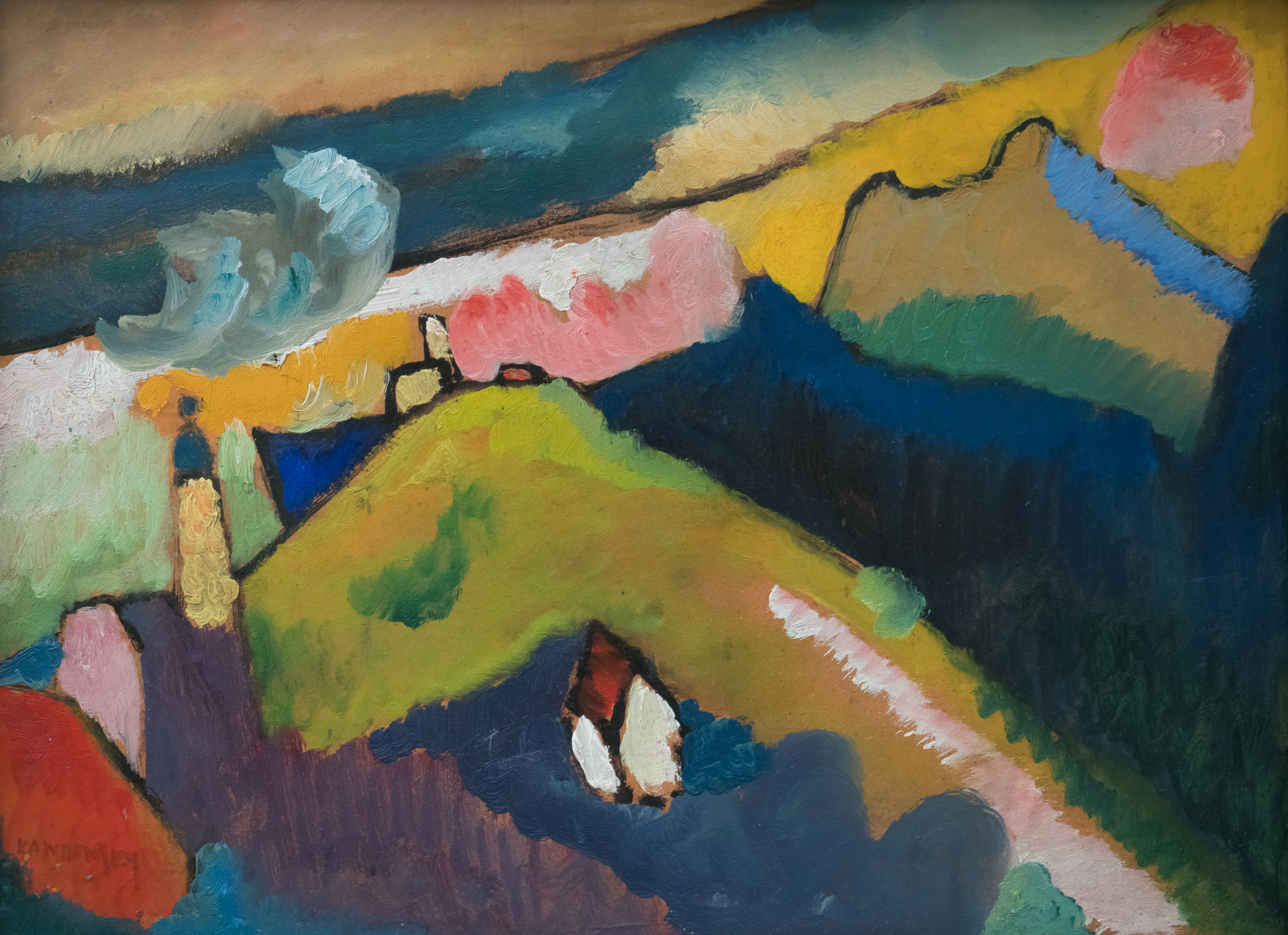
Wassily Kandinsky painting of Murnau am Staffelsee (1910)

For such a small town, Murnau has attracted quite a few noteworthy citizens over the years. Gabriele Münter and Wassily Kandinsky of the Blaue Reiter artistic collective lived there for several years. Ödön von Horvath spent a large part of his youth and young adulthood there and based some of his most well-known works (e.g. Jugend ohne Gott, Italienische Nacht) on happenings during the Third Reich in Murnau. Christoph Probst, executed by the Gestapo for being a member of the White Rose resistance group during the Third Reich, was born in Murnau. Filmmaker F. W. Murnau probably took his assumed name from the town, though there is no real factual evidence for this.

=== Sons and daughters of the town ===
- Johann Michael Wittmer (1802–1880), painter
- Thomas Alder (1932–1968), actor
- Peter Utzschneider (born 1946), bobsledder
- Stefan Gaisreiter (born 1947) bobsledder, won a bronze medal in the four-man event at the 1972 Winter Olympics
- Johannes Schöllhorn (born 1962) contemporary German composer.

=== Other personalities ===
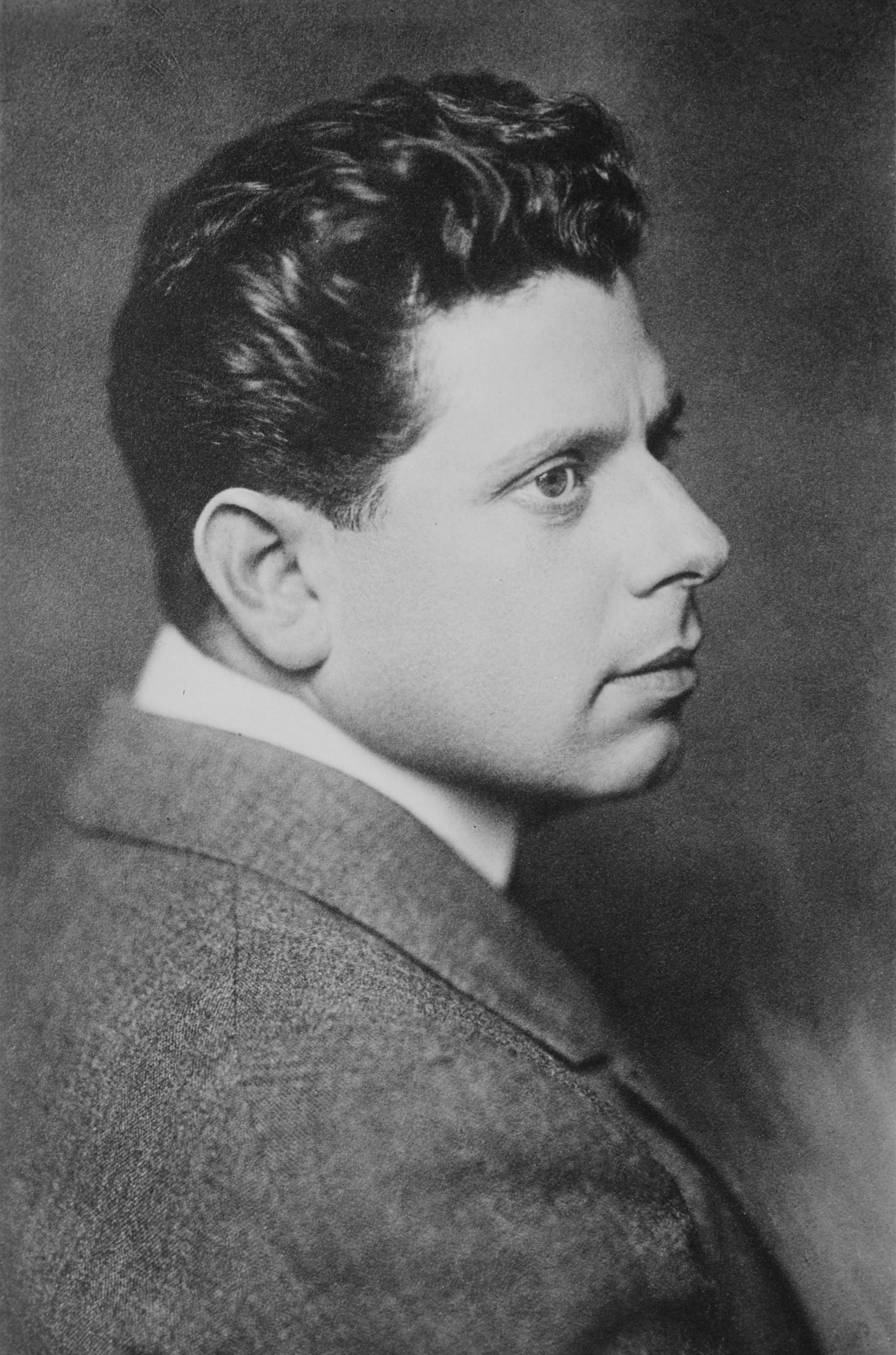
Max Reinhardt

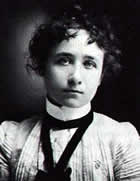
Gabriele Münter

- Isabel Maria de Alcântara, Duchess of Goiás (1824–1898) a Brazilian noble, died in Murnau
- James Loeb (1867–1933), classical scholar, art collector and philanthropist, lived in Murnau from 1912 until his death in 1933, financed the Murnau community hospital
- Max Reinhardt (1873–1943), staged Shakespeare's A Midsummer Night's Dream as open-air performance in 1910
- Gabriele Münter (1877–1962), painter ("Blue Rider"), companion of Wassily Kandinsky, lived in Murnau from 1909 on
- Walter von Molo (1880–1958), writer, died in Murnau
- Alfred Fischer (1881–1950), architect, died in Murnau
- Fritz Windgassen (1883–1963), opera singer, died in Murnau
- Karl Ritter (1883–1968) diplomat during the Third Reich, convicted war criminal, died in Murnau
- Gottfried Feder (1883–1941), self-taught economist, the Nazi economic theoretician, lived and died in Murnau
- Käthe Kruse (1883–1968), doll maker, died in Murnau
- Carl Rabus (1898–1983) expressionist artist, persecuted by the Nazis, lived in Murnau 1974 to 1983
- Erna Sack (1898–1972), opera singer, lived 1956–1966 in Murnau
- Willy Messerschmitt (1898–1978), aircraft designer and entrepreneur, arrested in 1945 in Murnau by the Allies, spent most of his house arrest in Murnau
- Kurt Eichhorn (1908–1994), conductor, lived and died in Murnau
- Hans Baumann (1914–1988), NS-songwriter and youth book author
- Kieth Engen (1925–2004), American operatic bass, lived in Murnau from 1972 until his death in 2004
- Klaus Höhne (1927–2006) actor, died in Murnau
- Karl Michael Vogler (1928–2009), actor, lived and died in Murnau
- Josef Anton Riedl (1929–2016), composer, lived in Murnau
- Dieter Schnebel (born 1930), composer, lives in Murnau
- Albert Speer Jr. (1934–2017), architect, son of Albert Speer, lived in Murnau
- Peter Fricke (born 1939), television actor, grew up with his mother in Murnau
