= Murnau station =

Railway station in Murnau am Staffelsee, Germany

Murnau
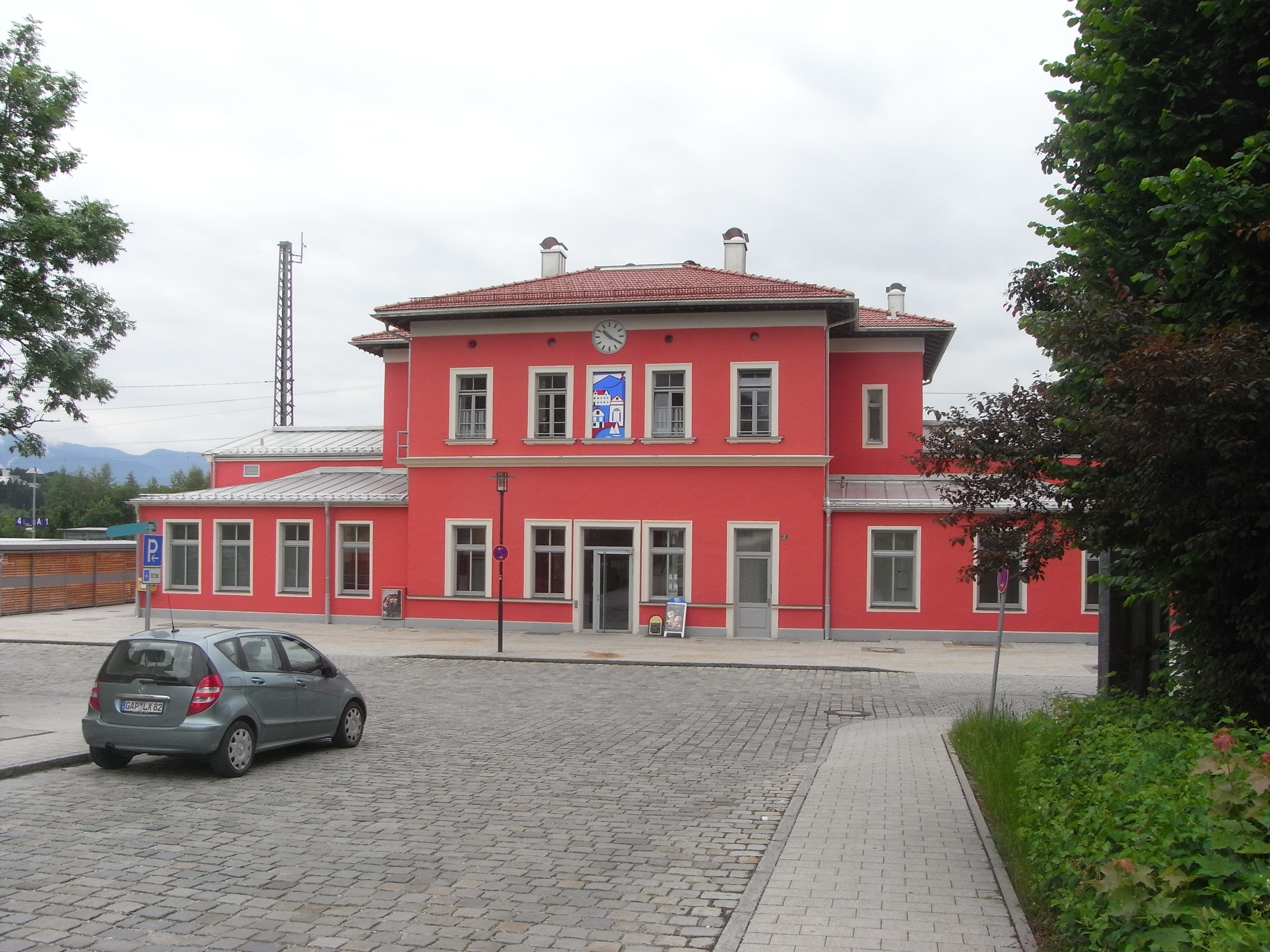
- 2013

General information
- Location: Bahnhofplatz 1; 82418 Murnau am Staffelsee; Bavaria; Germany
- Coordinates: 47.682251°N 11.19297°E
- Elevation: 692 m (2,270 ft)
- Owner: DB Netz
- Operator: DB Station&Service
- Lines: Munich–Garmisch-Partenkirchen railway (KBS 960); Ammergau Railway (KBS 963)
- Platforms: 1 bay platform; 1 island platform; 1 side platform
- Tracks: 4
- Train operators: DB Fernverkehr; DB Regio Bayern
- Connections: Regionalverkehr Oberbayern buses

Other information
- Station code: 4284
- DS100 code: MMU
- IBNR: 8004185
- Category: 4
- Website: www.bahnhof.de

History
- Opened: 15 May 1879; 147 years ago

Services
Preceding station	DB Fernverkehr	Following station
Garmisch-Partenkirchen Terminus	ICE 60 Limited service	Weilheim (Oberbay) towards Saarbrücken Hbf
Preceding station	DB Regio Bayern	Following station
Garmisch-Partenkirchen towards Mittenwald	RE 61	Weilheim (Oberbay) towards München Hbf
Garmisch-Partenkirchen towards Lermoos	RE 62	Weilheim (Oberbay) One-way operation
Ohlstadt towards Innsbruck Hbf	RB 6	Uffing am Staffelsee towards München Hbf
Ohlstadt towards Pfronten-Steinach	RB 60	Uffing am Staffelsee towards München Hbf
Murnau Ort towards Oberammergau	RB 63	Terminus
Location

Murnau station is a railway station in the municipality of Murnau am Staffelsee, located in the Garmisch-Partenkirchen district in Bavaria, Germany. It is located on the Munich–Garmisch-Partenkirchen railway of Deutsche Bahn.

== Services ==
In the 2026 timetable, the following regional services stop at the station:

Line	Route	Frequency
ICE 60	Saarbrücken – Kaiserslautern – Mannheim – Stuttgart – Ulm – Augsburg – Munich – Munich – Tutzing – Murnau – Garmisch-Partenkirchen	1 train on some Sats and Suns towards Saarbrücken
RE 61 / RE 62	Munich – Weilheim – Murnau – Garmisch-Partenkirchen (– Mittenwald) / (– Lermoos)	Some trains
RB 6 / RB 60	Munich –Tutzing – Weilheim – Murnau – Garmisch-Partenkirchen (– Mittenwald – Seefeld in Tirol (– Innsbruck) / (– Reutte in Tirol – Pfronten-Steinach)	Hourly, every two hours to Seefeld, every four hours as S6 to Innsbruck
RB 63	Murnau – Bad Kohlgrub – Oberammergau	Hourly
