= Oberammergau station =

Railway station in Oberammergau, Germany

Oberammergau
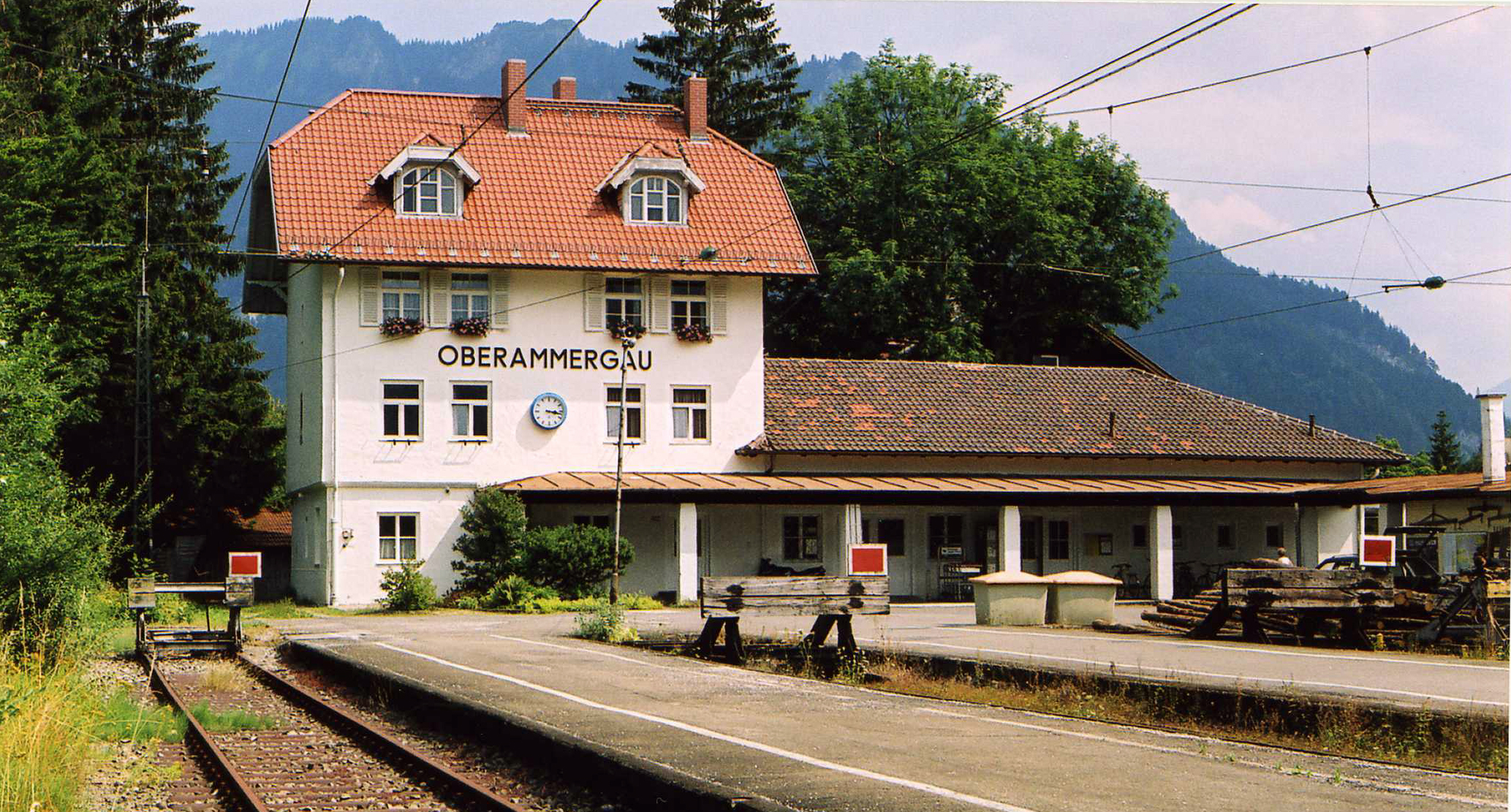
- The station in 2004

General information
- Location: Bahnhofstr. 1 Oberammergau, Bavaria; Germany
- Coordinates: 47°35′58″N 11°03′26″E
- Owner: DB Netz
- Operator: DB Station&Service
- Lines: Ammergau Railway (KBS 963)
- Distance: 23.7 km (14.7 mi) from Murnau
- Platforms: 1 side platform
- Tracks: 1
- Train operators: DB Regio Bayern
- Connections: Regionalverkehr Oberbayern buses

Other information
- Station code: 4618
- DS100 code: MOA
- IBNR: 8004503
- Category: 6

Services
Preceding station	DB Regio Bayern	Following station
Terminus	RB 63	Unterammergau towards Murnau
Location

Oberammergau station (German: Haltepunkt Oberammergau) is a railway station in the municipality of Oberammergau, in Bavaria, Germany. It is the southern terminus of the Ammergau Railway of Deutsche Bahn.

== Services ==
As of the December 2021 timetable change, the following services stop at Oberammergau:

- RB: hourly service to Murnau
