= Ammergau Railway =

Railway line in Germany

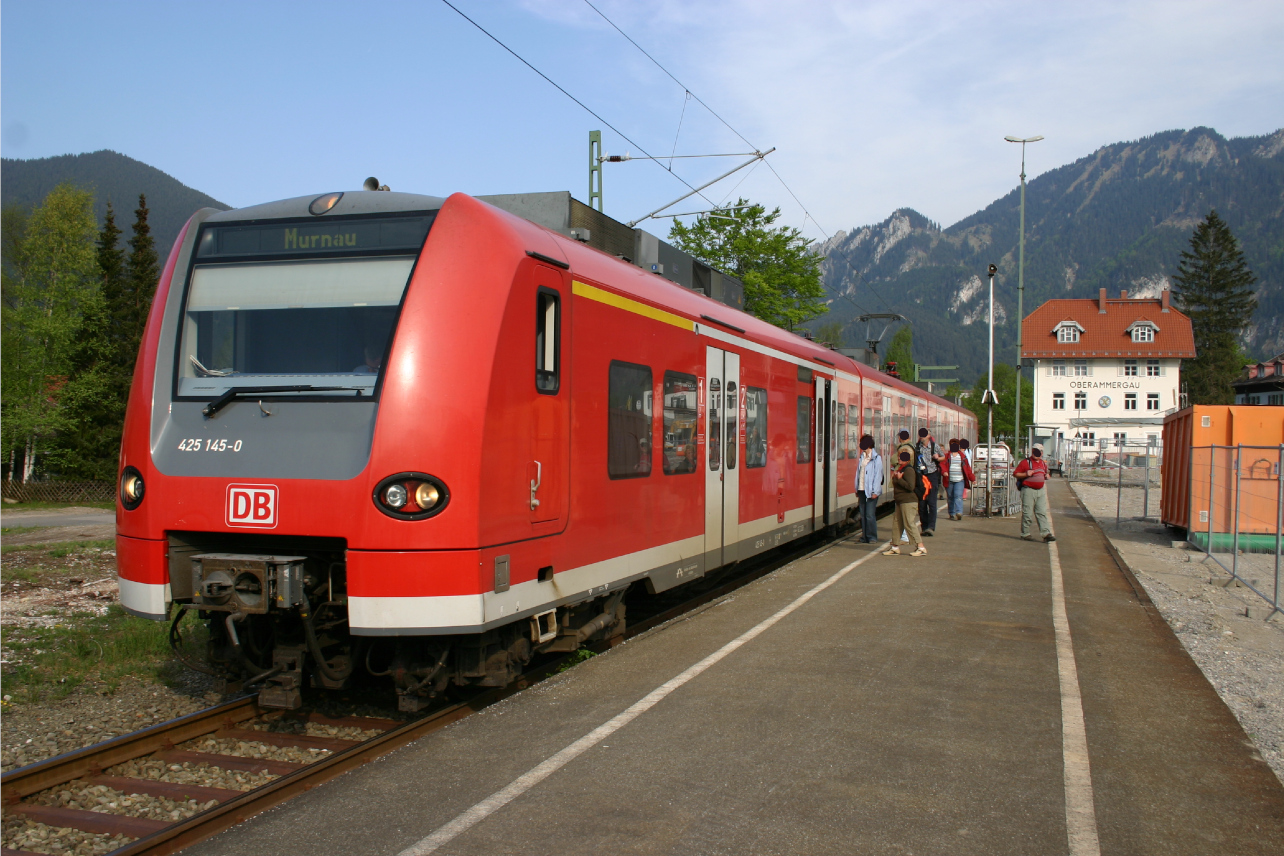
- ET 425 in Oberammergau (2007)

Overview
- Native name: Ammergaubahn
- Status: Operational
- Owner: Deutsche Bahn
- Line number: 5451
- Locale: Bavaria
- Termini: Murnau; Oberammergau
- Stations: 11

Service
- Type: Heavy rail, Passenger rail Regional rail
- Route number: 963
- Operator(s): DB Regio

History
- Opened: 5 April 1900

Technical
- Line length: 23.7 km (14.7 mi)
- Number of tracks: Single track
- Track gauge: 1,435 mm (4 ft 8 1/2 in) standard gauge
- Electrification: 5 kV/16 2/3 Hz (Until 1954); 15 kV/16 2/3 Hz AC overhead line
Route map
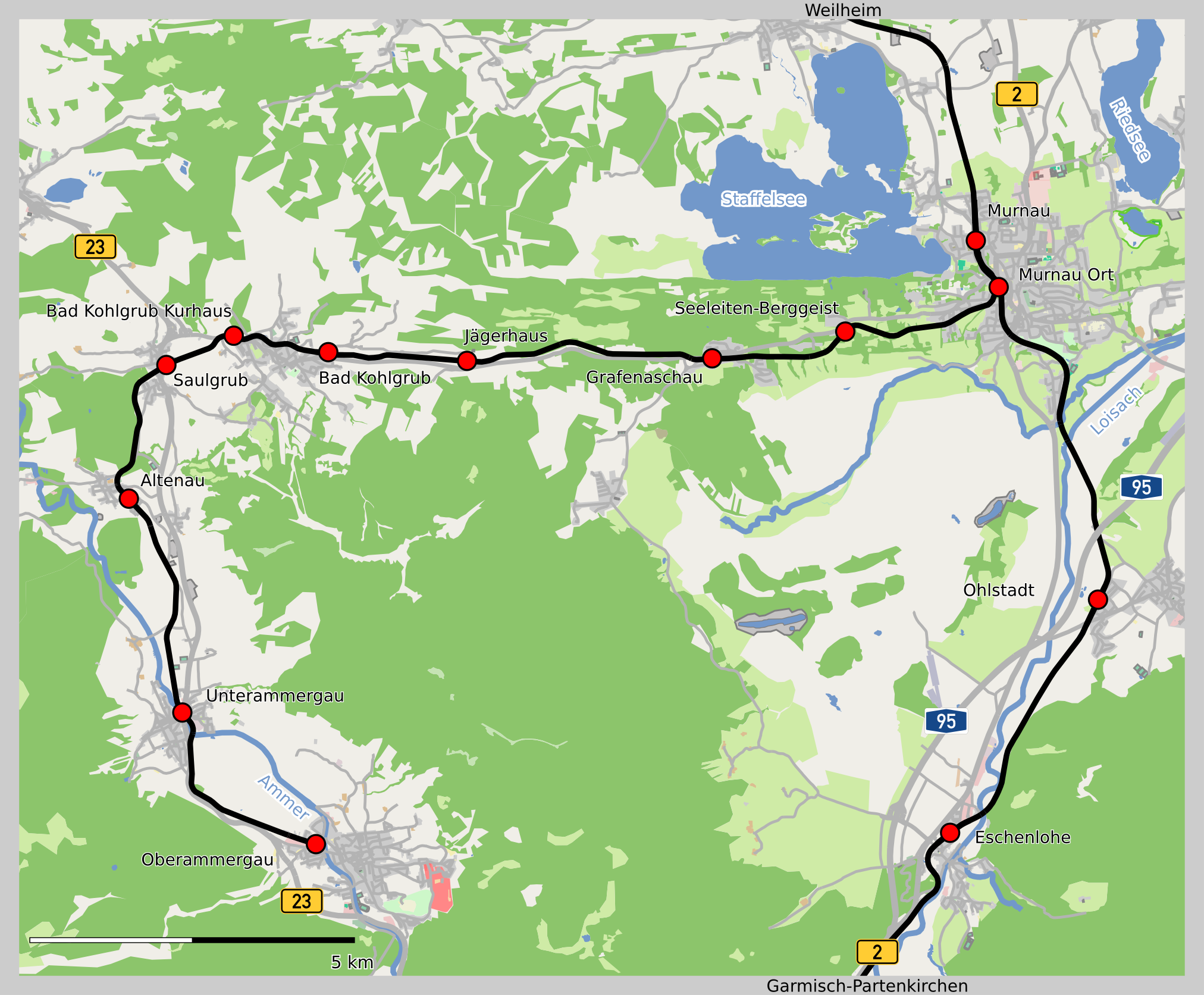

The Ammergau Railway or Ammergaubahn (sometimes called the Ammertalbahn or "Ammer Valley Railway", originally the Lokalbahn Murnau–Oberammergau) is a single-tracked, electrified railway line in Bavaria in southern Germany. It runs from Murnau to Oberammergau, its latter stages following the valley of the river Ammer from which it derives its name. This stub line to Oberammergau branches off at Murnau from the Munich–Garmisch-Partenkirchen main line.

== Operations and history ==
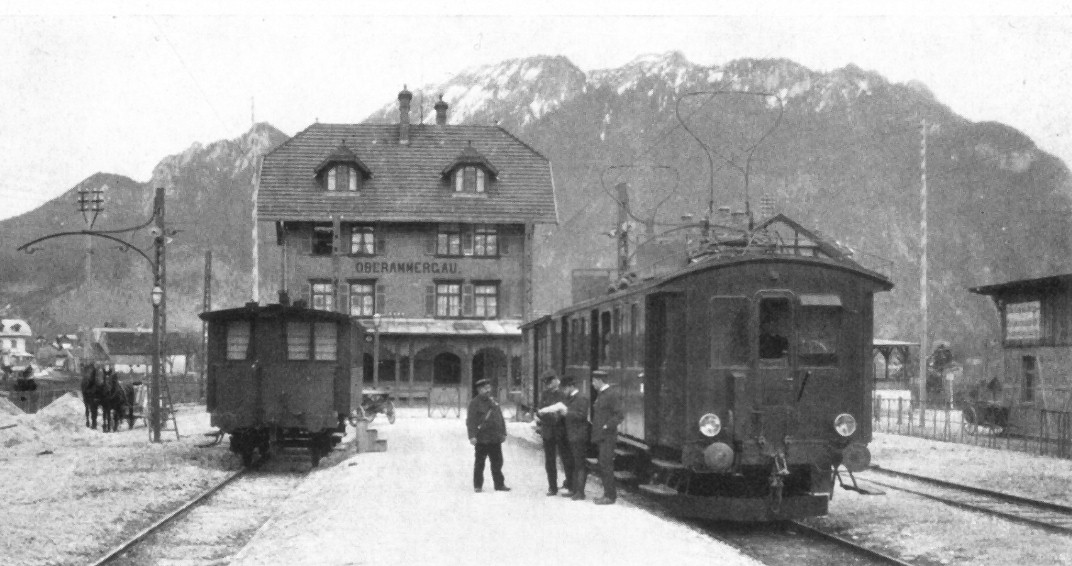
A LAG railbus in early 1905 at Oberammergau station

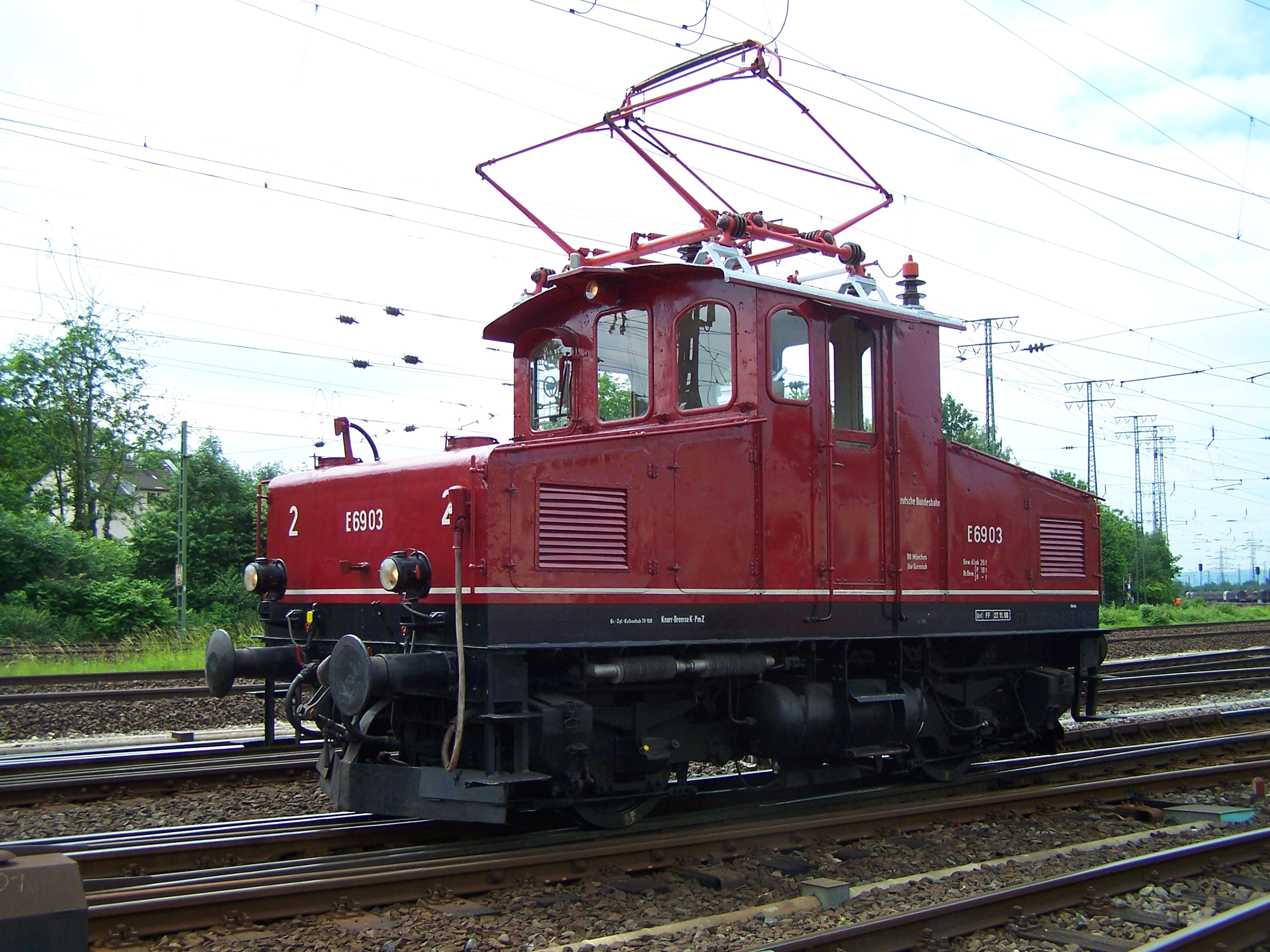
One of the iconic E 69 locomotives which served the Ammergaubahn from 1905 until the 1980s

This 23.671 km long route was completed on 1 May 1900 under a Bavarian concession granted on 24 January 1897 to the Lokalbahn AG (LAG). On 1 January 1905 it was electrified, becoming the first railway in Germany to run on single-phase AC power. Originally the line was electrified with 5.5 kV, 16 Hz AC. With effect from 1 August 1938 the LAG was transferred to the Deutsche Reichsbahn. But it was not until 1954-55 that the power system was converted to the usual 15 kV, 16^{2}/_{3} Hz by the Deutsche Bundesbahn, and four of the five DRG Class E 69 electric locomotives modified accordingly.

With road traffic increasing in popularity, the Ammergau Railway was affected just as badly as other branch lines in the railway network. Goods traffic dwindled to virtually nothing and the number of passengers fell steadily to between 500 and 1,000 per day. As a result, a vast amount of infrastructure has been removed.

In 1999 there were negotiations with the passenger union Pro Bahn and DB Regio Bayern AG. Pro Bahn demanded inter alia a new crossing place at Altenau (Bay) and the retention of the second track at Oberammergau. That would have enabled journey times to be reduced by about 10 minutes. But the cost of about 4 million marks was too high and the project was put on ice.

== Modernisation ==
In recent times the route has been extensively modernised. However all infrastructure no longer needed for scheduled services fell victim to this process, which resulted in major criticism of Deutsche Bahn by Pro Bahn and others. For example, since the renovation in autumn 2005 there has only been one track at the terminus in Oberammergau; the rest of the area has been built on to provide a bus station and other facilities. As a result, the terminus was downgraded from a station to a halt. The stations at Grafenaschau and Unterammergau were likewise downgraded to stops, since when trains cannot be caught from either location. As a direct result of these rationalisation measures, specials can no longer run during the day to Oberammergau, because there is no longer anywhere for them to cross. The only remaining crossing place—at Bad Kohlgrub—is needed for scheduled services. Here the regular trains cross hourly. Furthermore, locomotives can no longer run around at the terminus in Oberammergau; only push-pull trains or multiple units can use the single track there.

In the area of Bad Kohlgrub, 10 kilometres of 80-year-old track was replaced; the new rails were continuously welded. The route was also equipped in 2005 with the GSM-R digital train radio system. Since 28 November 2008 the line has also to be controlled from the electronic signal box at Garmisch-Partenkirchen. This means that the Fahrdienstleiter post at Bad Kohlgrub can be saved.

One curiosity was the request stop at Jägerhaus, where formerly trains passed through at night without stopping for safety reasons because the stop had no platform lighting. The station has since been closed.

== Operational stock ==
Once the original Class 169 locomotives had retired in the early 1980s due to their advanced state of obsolescence, they were replaced by Class 141 locomotives. The rolling stock, however, remained the same: the so-called Silberlings being employed (two coaches per train). The locomotive-hauled trains were finally replaced by Class 425 and 426 multiples (two sets being required for scheduled services), the last Class 141-hauled push-pull trains working the line in autumn 2004. Since the summer of 2013, Bombardier Talent 2 (class 442) railcars have been used.

== See also ==
- Royal Bavarian State Railways
- Bavarian branch lines
- List of closed railway lines in Bavaria
