= Ettal =

- Municipality
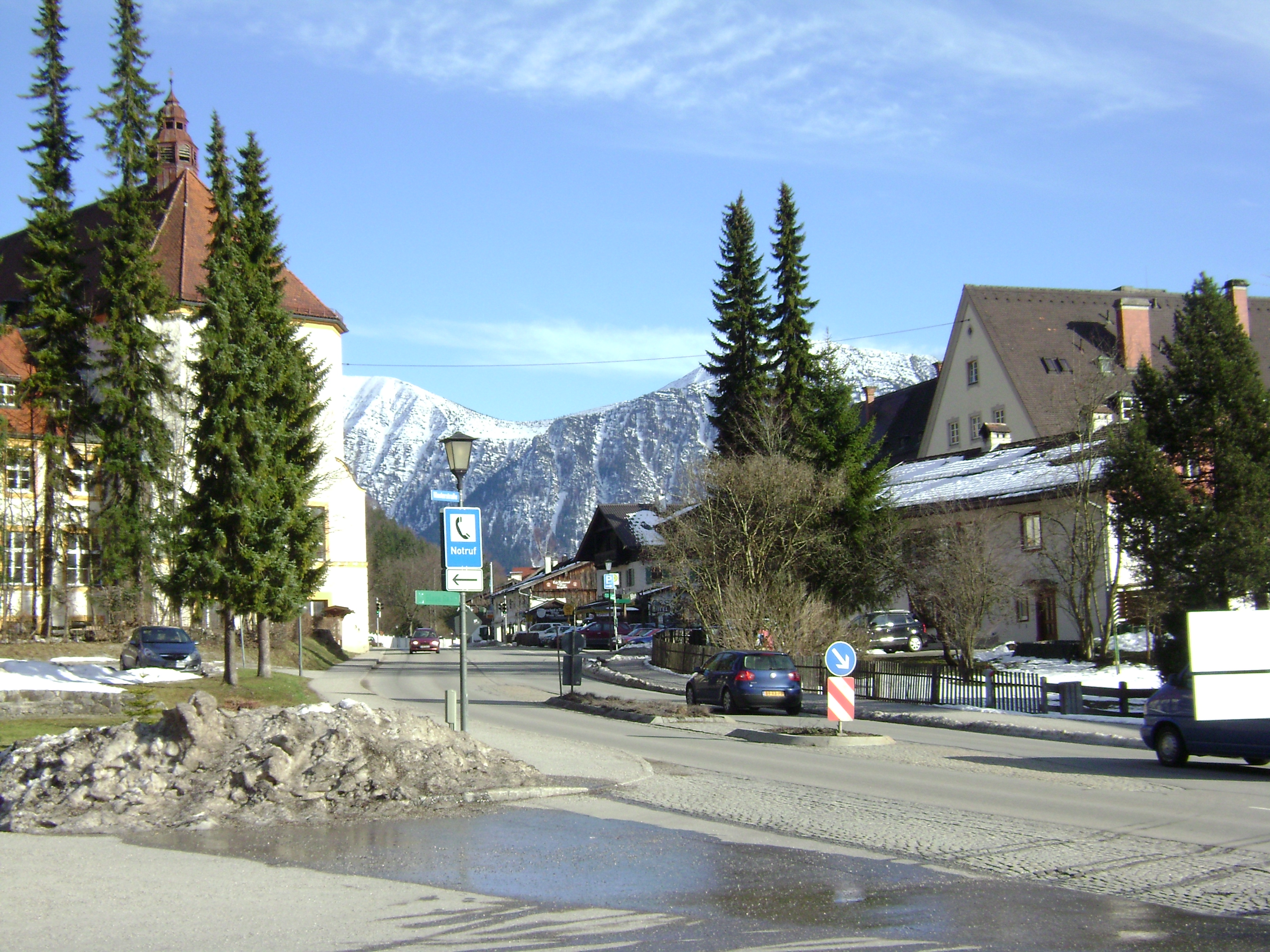
- Ettal in March 2008

- Coat of arms

- Location of Ettal within Garmisch-Partenkirchen district
- Interactive map of Ettal
- Location within Germany Location within Bavaria
- Coordinates: 47°34′N 11°6′E
- Country: Germany
- State: Bavaria
- Admin. region: Oberbayern
- District: Garmisch-Partenkirchen
- Municipal assoc.: Unterammergau

Government
  - Mayor (2020–26): Vanessa Voit (FW)

Area
  - Total: 140.75 km^{2} (54.34 sq mi)
- Elevation: 877 m (2,877 ft)

Population (2025-12-31)
  - Total: 684
  - Density: 4.86/km^{2} (12.6/sq mi)
- Time zone: UTC+01:00 (CET)
  - Summer (DST): UTC+02:00 (CEST)
- Postal codes: 82488
- Dialling codes: 08822
- Vehicle registration: GAP
- Website: www.gemeinde-ettal.de

Ettal is a German municipality and a village in the district of Garmisch-Partenkirchen in Bavaria.

== Geography ==
Ettal is situated in the Oberland area in the Graswangtal between the Loisachtal and Ammertal, approx. 10 km north of Garmisch-Partenkirchen, the district capital, and approx. 4 km southwest of Oberammergau.

=== Division of the town ===
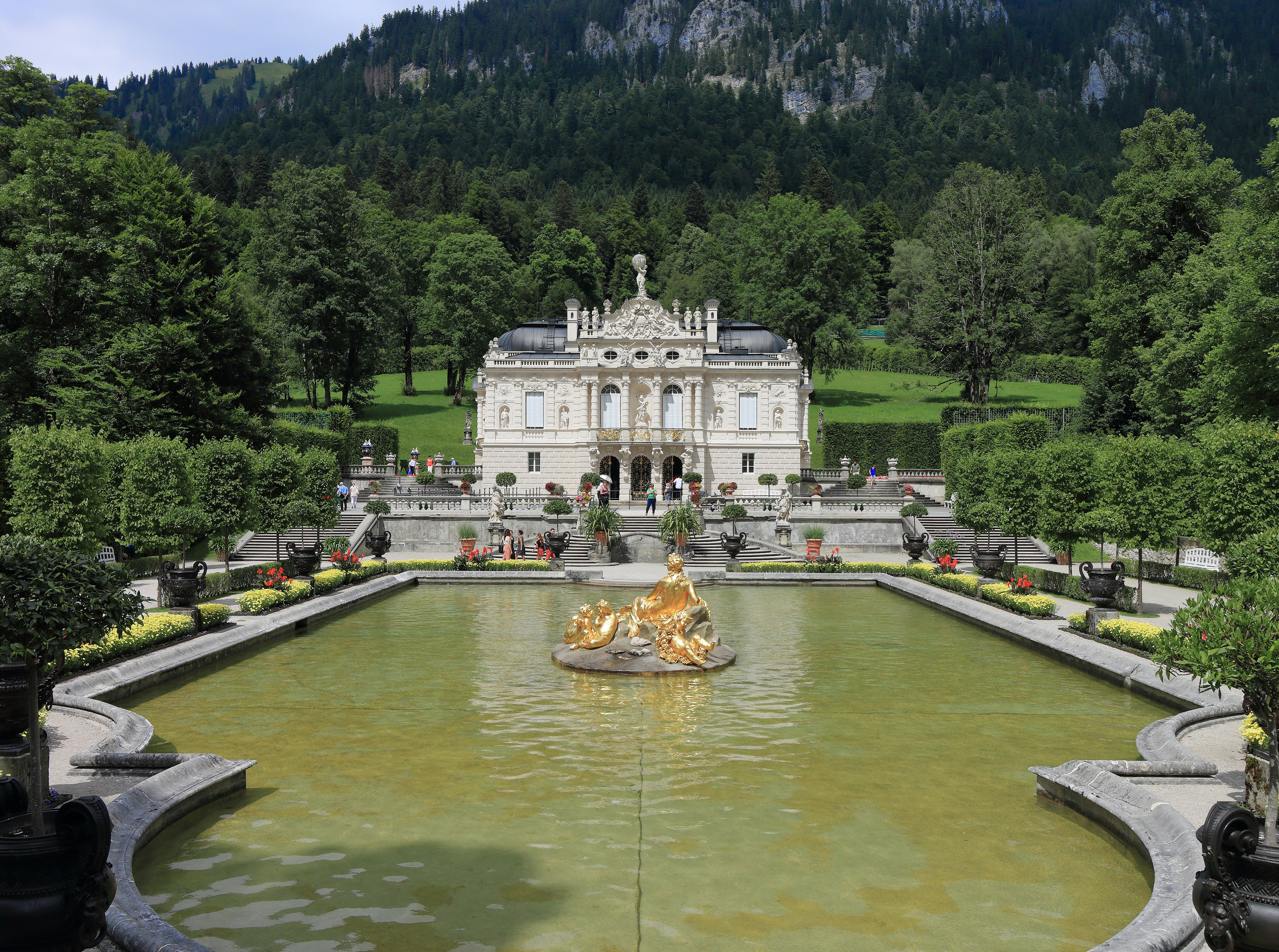
Linderhof Palace

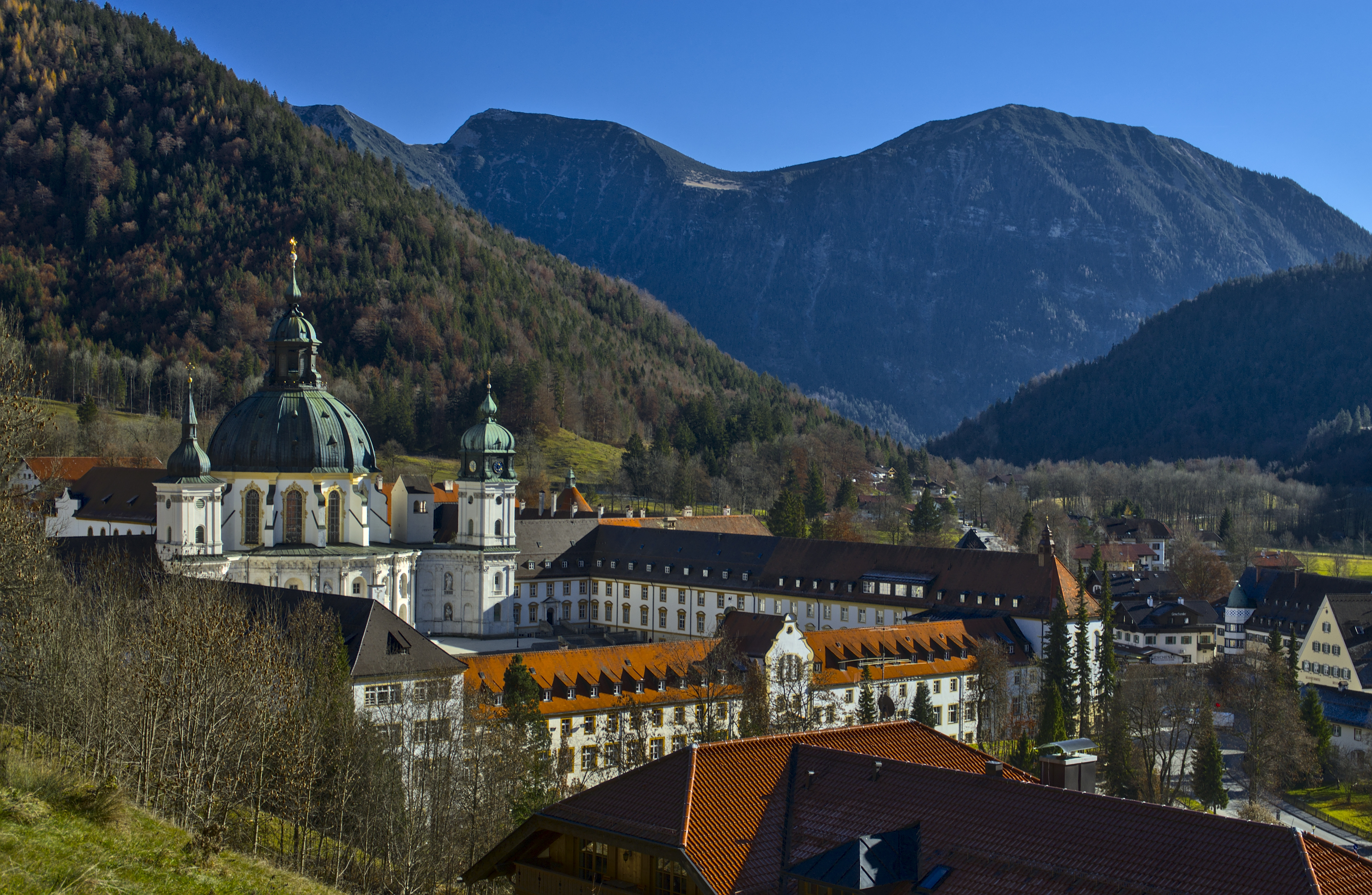
Ettal Abbey

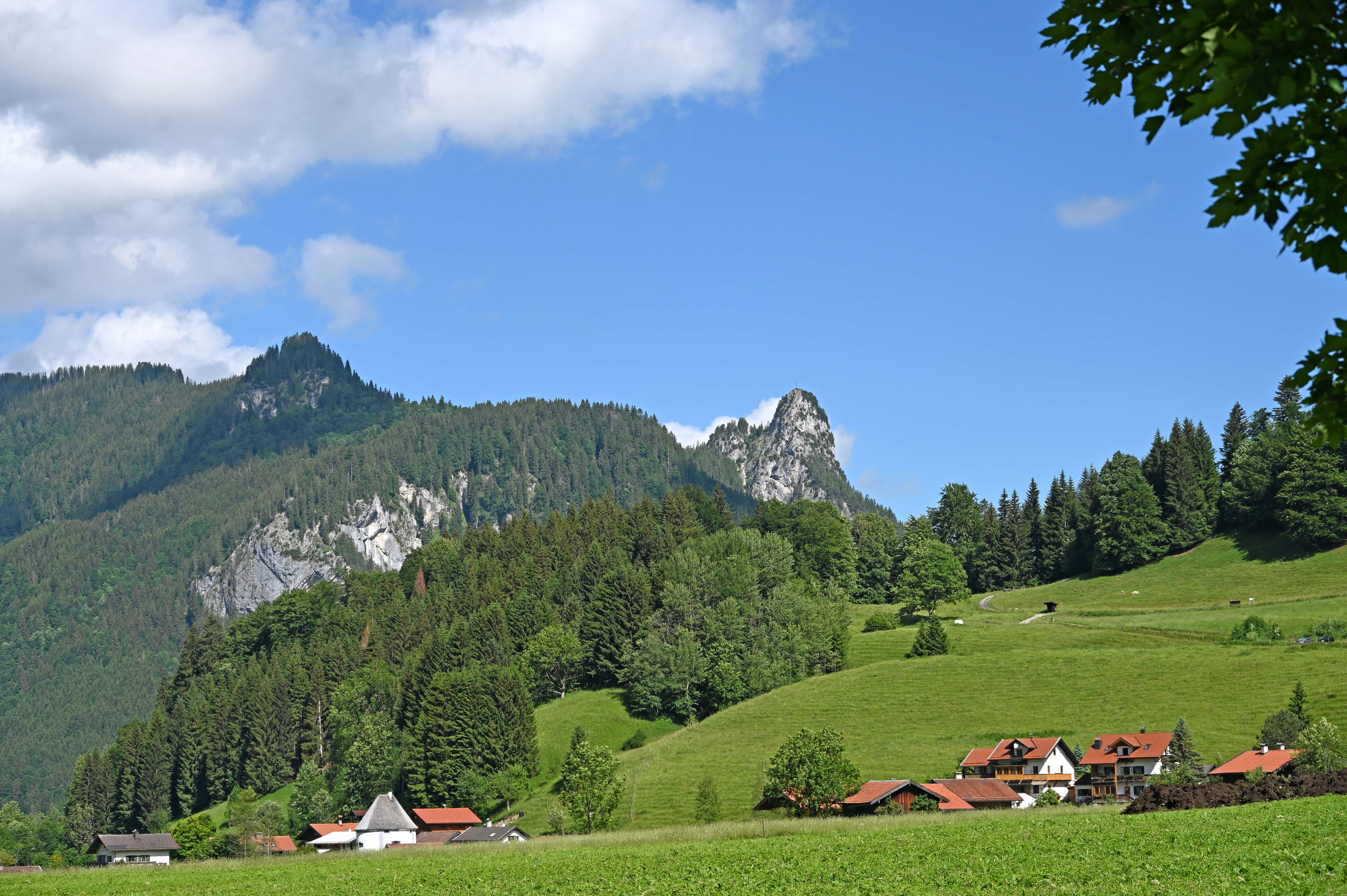
Pastoral view of Kofel peak

The town consists of 5 districts:

- Ettal
- Graswang
- Linderhof
- Dickelschwaig
- Rahm

== See also ==
- Ettal Abbey
