= Oberammergau Passion Play =

Passion play performed in Germany

Coordinates: 47°35′59″N 11°03′42″E

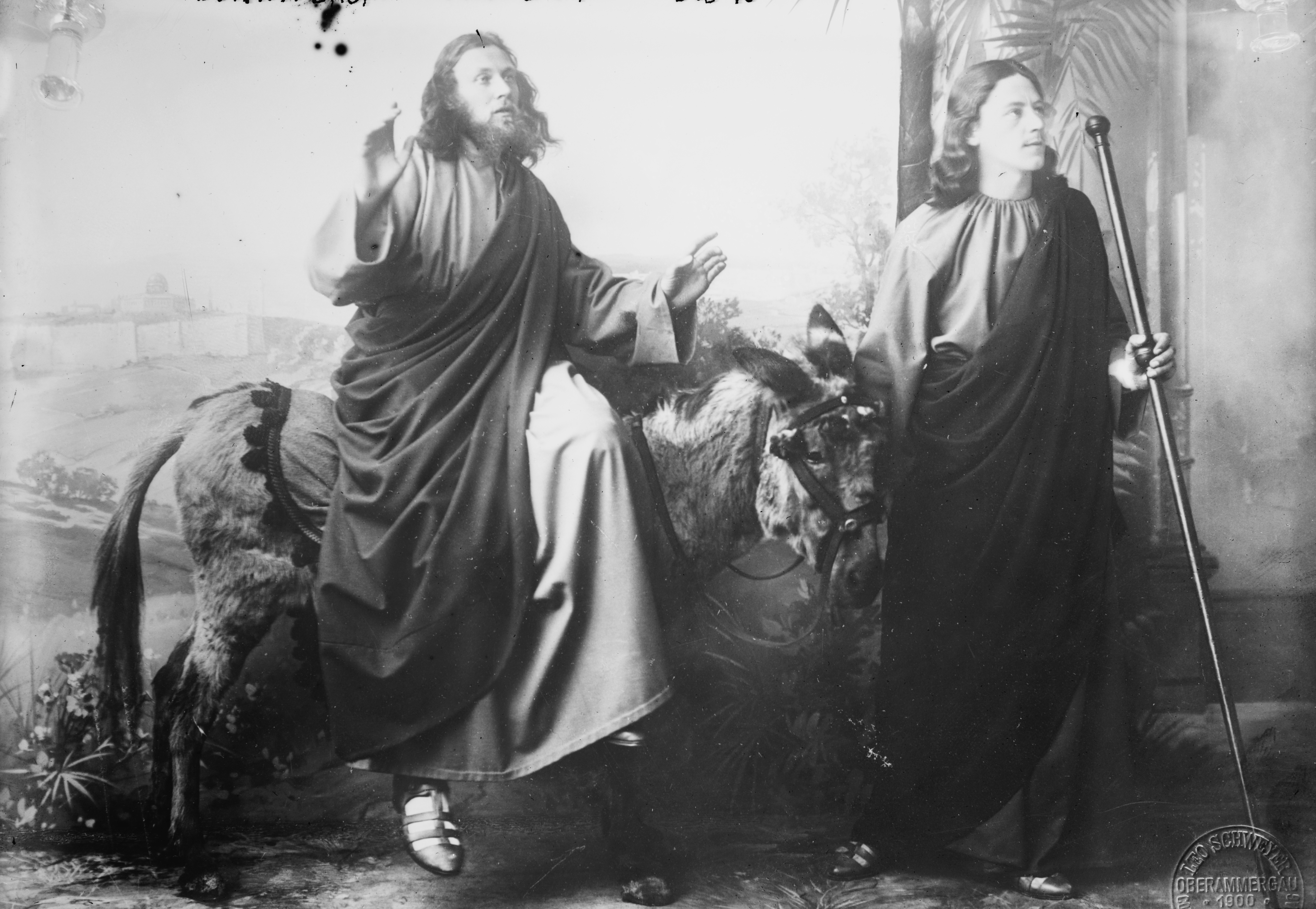
Jesus Christ and John, 1900 performance of the Oberammergau Passion Play.

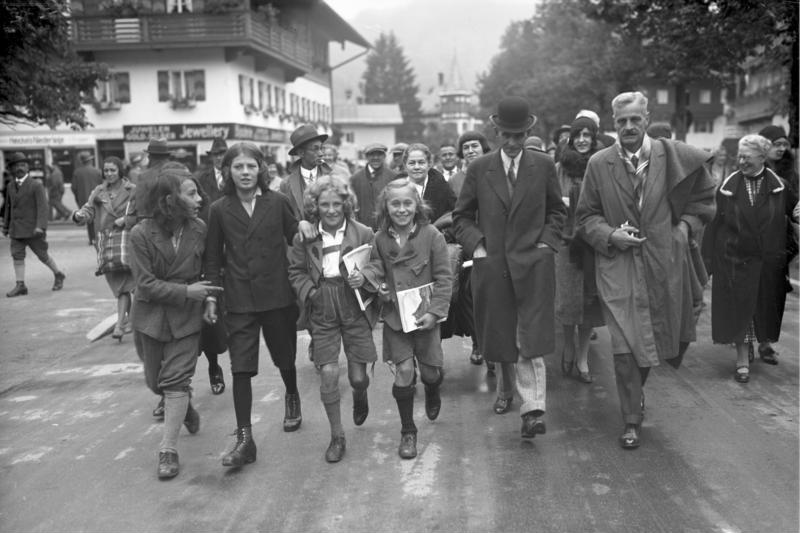
Henry Ford attending the Passion Play in 1930

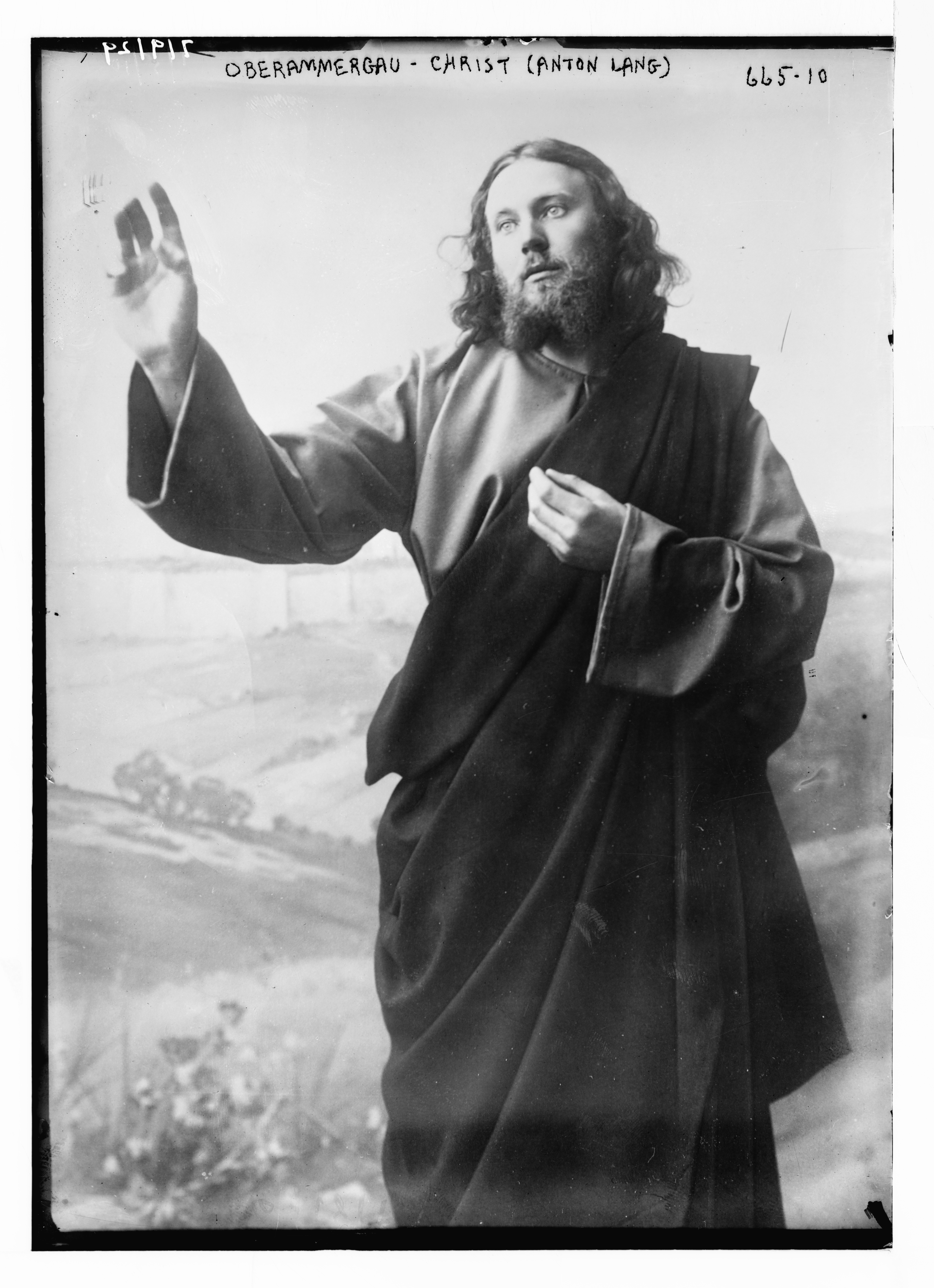
Christ (Anton Lang) in passion play, Oberammergau, Bavaria, Germany LCCN2014683195

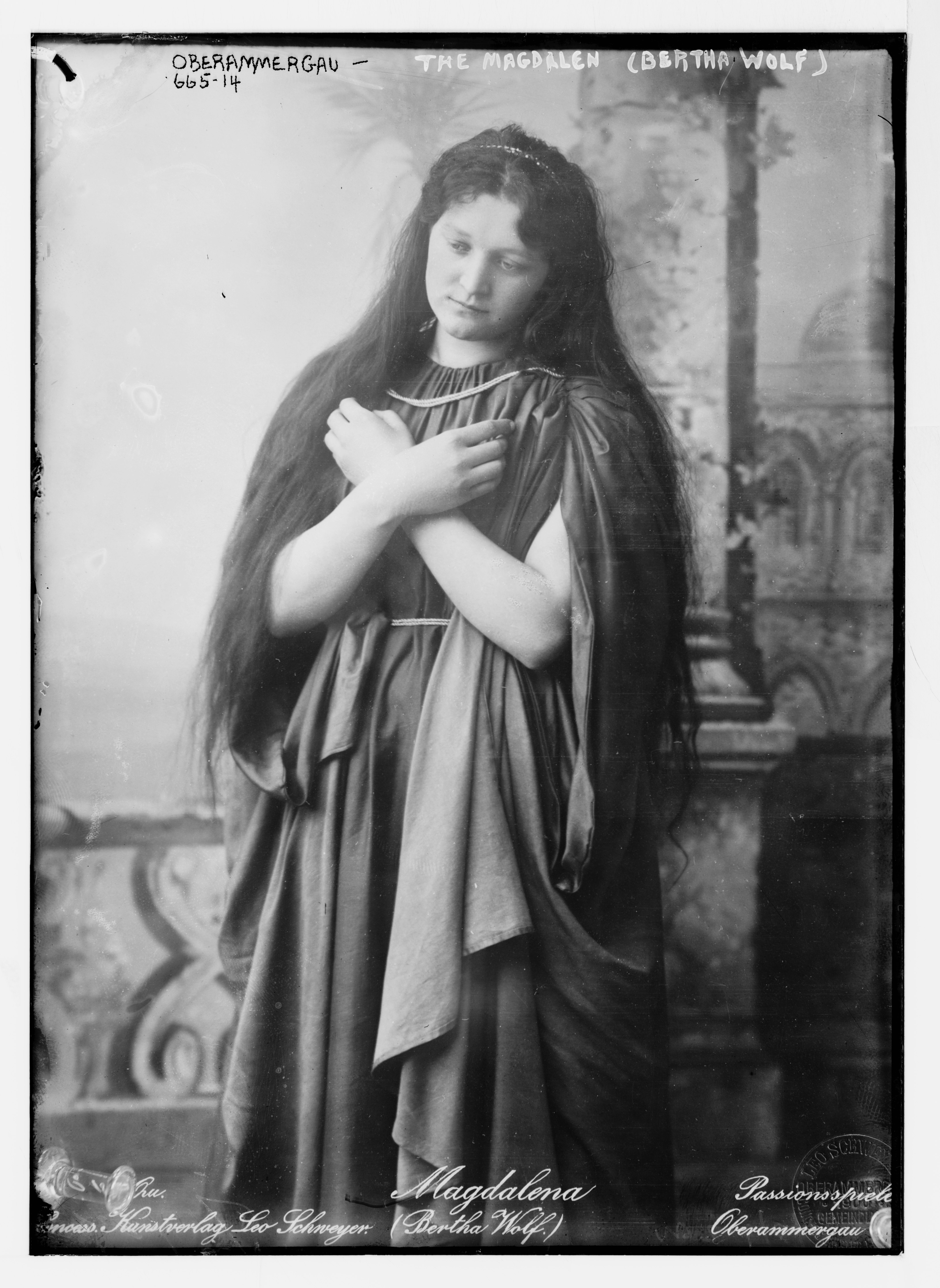
Magdalen (Bertha Wolf) in passion play, Oberammergau, Bavaria, Germany LCCN2014683196

The Oberammergau Passion Play (German: Oberammergauer Passionsspiele) is a passion play that has been performed every 10 years from 1634 to 1674 and each decadal year since 1680 (with a few exceptions) by the inhabitants of the village of Oberammergau, Bavaria, Germany. It was written by Othmar Weis, J A Daisenberger, Otto Huber, Christian Stuckl, Rochus Dedler, Eugen Papst, Marcus Zwink, Ingrid H Shafer, and the inhabitants of Oberammergau, with music by Dedler. Since its first production it has been performed on open-air stages in the village. The text of the play is a composite of four distinct manuscripts dating from the 15th and 16th centuries.

The play is a staging of Jesus' passion, covering the short final period of His life from His visit to Jerusalem and leading to His execution by crucifixion. It is the earliest continuous survivor of the age of Christian religions vernacular drama.

== Background ==
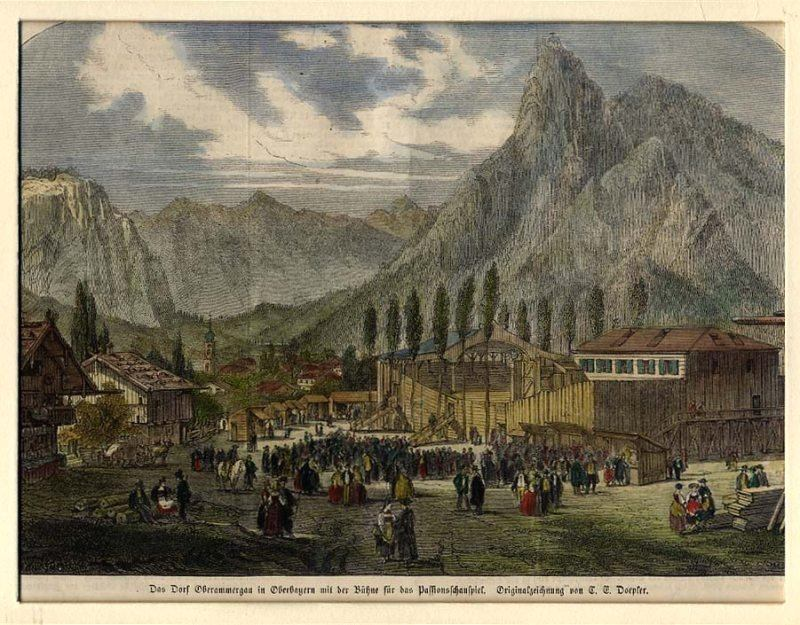
1860 production

=== Vow ===
According to legend: an outbreak of bubonic plague devastated Bavaria during the Thirty Years' War (1618–1648). Bad Kohlgrub was so depopulated that only two married couples remained alive. The village of Oberammergau remained plague-free until 25 September 1633, when a man named Kaspar Schisler returned home after working in the nearby village of Eschenlohe. Over the next 33 days, 81 villagers would die, half of Oberammergau's population. On 28 October 1633, the villagers vowed that if God spared them from the plague, they would perform a play every 10 years depicting the life and death of Jesus. Nobody died of plague in Oberammergau after that vow, and the villagers kept their word to God by performing the passion play for the first time in 1634.

The legend is a distorted account of the actual plague. There was an outbreak of plague in Oberammergau, but it took place from September 1632 to March 1633, when there were a total of 84 deaths from all causes. Deaths followed an epidemic curve instead of ending suddenly. There was one death in September 1632, rising to 20 deaths in March 1633, and ending with one death in July 1633. There is also no record of a man named Kaspar Schisler. Only two couples got married in Bad Kohlgrub in 1634, instead of only two couples surviving the plague. There were 39 marriages in Bad Kohlgrub in 1635, so hundreds of villagers must have survived.

The errors may have been introduced by the retelling of an oral history that was not written down until 1733. The original work has been lost, and only fragments of the oral history survive as quotations in other works. The legend is told in the play The Plague of 1633 (German: Die Pestnot Anno 1633), which used to be performed the year before the Passion Play. It was retold as recently as the 1999 vow ceremony, which marked the beginning of rehearsals for the 2000 play. The town of Oberammergau now claims that Kaspar Schisler came home for a church festival in 1632 instead of 1633.

=== Performance ===
The production involves over 2,000 people: actors, musicians, stage technicians, and others, all residents of the village. The play comprises spoken dramatic text, musical and choral accompaniment and tableaux vivants, which are scenes from the Old Testament depicted for the audience by motionless actors accompanied by verbal description. These scenes are the basis for the typology, the interrelationship between the Old and New Testaments, of the play. They include a scene of King Ahasuerus rejecting Vashti in favor of Esther, the brothers selling Joseph into slavery in Egypt, and Moses raising up the nehushtan (bronze serpent) in the wilderness. Each scene precedes that section of the play that is considered to be prefigured by the scene. The three tableaux mentioned are presented to the audience as prefiguring Christianity superseding Judaism, Judas selling information on the location of Jesus, and the crucifixion of Jesus.

The evolution of the Passion Play was about the same as that of the Easter Play, originating in the ritual of the Latin Church, which prescribes, among other things, that the Gospel on Good Friday should be sung in parts divided among various persons.

== Plot synopsis ==
Prelude

The prologue and chorus greet the audience. Two tableaux are presented. In the first, Adam and Eve, wearing sheepskins are banished from the Garden of Eden by a winged angel who holds a sword in the form of a flame. Behind the angel stands a burst of gilded rays symbolizing the tree of forbidden fruit. The second living picture traditionally showed a number of girls and smaller children surrounding a cross at center stage. The adoration represents the time in 1633 when villagers swore their vow before a huge crucifix bearing a twelve-foot-high Jesus.

Act 1 Jesus and the Money Changers. Jesus enters Jerusalem on a donkey to the shouts and exultation of the people on Palm Sunday. He drives the money changers and traders from the Second Temple then returns to Bethany.

Act 2 Conspiracy of the High Council. In the past, this act began with a tableau showing the sons of the patriarch Jacob conspiring to kill Joseph in the Plain of Dothan; the frieze was deleted from the 1980 presentation. The act consists of discussions between the traders and Sanhedrin, who agree that Jesus must be arrested to preserve Mosaic law.

Act 3 Parting at Bethany. Two tableaux presage the action. In the first, the young Tobias departs from his parents while the angel Raphael, played by another boy, waits, crook in hand, stage left. In the second, the loving bridesmaid from the Song of Solomon laments the loss of her groom. In the play, Christ is anointed by Mary Magdalene, then takes leave of his mother and friends. Judas is angered by the waste of the spikenard oil.

Act 4 The Last Journey to Jerusalem. A controversial tableau (now deleted) showed Queen Vashti dishonored at the court of King Ahasuerus. The old queen (Judaism, explains the Prologue) has been displaced by Esther (Christianity). Jesus sends two disciples to secure a Paschal lamb. He enters Jerusalem for the last time and weeps over the fate of the city. Judas contemplates betraying his master and is tempted by Dathan and other merchants.

Act 5 The Last Supper. The Passover Seder or Last Supper is celebrated in a scene evocative of the famous Da Vinci painting. Jesus washes the feet of his disciples and institutes the mass with wine and thick, brown, leavened bread. Two tableaux show Moses with rays or horns protruding from his head, bringing manna and grapes to the people in the wilderness.

Act 6 The Betrayer. In a tableau, Joseph, a boy nude to the waist, is sold by his brothers to the Midianites for twenty pieces of silver. In accompanying action, Judas appears before the Sanhedrin and promises to deliver Jesus for thirty pieces of silver. After his departure, the Pharisees plan at great length the death of Jesus.

Act 7 Jesus at the Mount of Olives. Two more Old Testament scenes introduce the soliloquy of Jesus in the Garden of Gethsemane. The first, a non-sequitur, which we are told explains that man must earn his food by the sweat of his brow, shows Adam, in sheepskin and assisted by a brood of similarly attired children, drawing a plow across a field. The second frieze more appropriately offers a helmeted Joab, surrounded by soldiers stabbing an unsuspecting Amasa in the ribs. Christ agonizes over his fate while his apostles doze. Judas enters with an armed band and betrays Jesus with a kiss.

Act 8 Jesus before Annas. The Old Testament parallel has Micah slapped on the cheek by Zedekiah, priest of Baal, for daring to predict King Ahab would die in battle. In like manner, Jesus is taken before a waiting, eager Annas and is struck on the face for his insolence. Soldiers also deride Christ as he is led through the streets by a rope.

Act 9 Condemned by the High Council. Two more tableaux emphasize the humiliation of Christ. In one, the aged Naboth is condemned by false witnesses and is stoned to death by the sons of Jezebel. In the other, Job, sitting on a dunghill is railed at by his friends, servants, even his wife and children. Meanwhile, Jesus is questioned by Caiaphas about his messiah-ship and is condemned. A tortured Judas tries to get the Sanhedrin to repeal its verdict. When his efforts prove unsuccessful, he tosses the money back at them and storms off.

Act 10 Despair of Judas. Judas and all who identify with him are linked with Cain in the opening tableau. The battered body of Abel appears at center stage. To the right is Cain, clad in a leopard skin and holding a club in one hand. His other hand is at his brow, attempting to conceal the brand of God. In this short act Judas offers a speech of remorse then hangs himself.

Act 11 Christ before Pilate. Originally there was a frieze that heralded Christ's first appearance before Pilate. The tableau of Daniel in the great pillared hall of Darius was deleted from later twentieth-century productions. Pilate's interrogation, coupled with news of his wife's dream, convinces the governor that Jesus should be prosecuted by Herod Antipas for lese majesty.

Act 12 Christ Before Herod. The scene stands without the original living picture which showed a blinded Samson mocked by the Philistines. Herod treats Christ with scorn, demanding a miracle, then sends him back to Pilate, cloaked in a red mantle of royalty. Responding to the urging of the Sanhedrin, Pilate reluctantly agrees to have Jesus scourged. Roman guards beat Jesus and press a crown of thorns into his scalp.

Act 13 Christ Sentenced to Death on the Cross. Two graphic pictures showing the presentation of Joseph's bloodied coat to Jacob, and Abraham about to stab Isaac on Mt. Moriah have been rejected from contemporary versions of the Passion. Retained, however, are tableaux which show Joseph riding a sedan chair as vizir of Egypt and another which supposedly represents the scapegoat offering of Yom Kippur. Following the tableaux, the stage is swarming with action as priests and Pharisees bring mobs from every direction. Pilate gives Jesus another hearing then offers the people a choice between Jesus and Barabbas. They demand and receive a final judgement on Christ.

Act 14 The Way of the Cross. The final segment of the Passion is introduced by a more sublime image of the Akedah, or binding of Isaac. In this tableau, the boy, like Jesus, carries wood on his back as he and Abraham climb Mt. Moriah. Another frieze, showing Moses and a bronze serpent intertwined about the cross has been deleted. When the chorus withdraws from the stage Christ bears his cross to Golgotha. As he passes through the streets he encounters his mother, Veronica, and Simon of Cyrene. The women of Jerusalem weep for him.

Act 15 Jesus on Calvary. For the first time the chorus appears in black traditional mourning garb. There is no tableau. He is mocked by members of the Sanhedrin and the soldiers and utters his last words. The legs of the criminals are broken. A soldier pierces the side of Christ with a lance and blood gushes forth. Jesus' followers slowly and reverently take down the body and lay it before his mother in a replica of the Pieta. The Sanhedrin insists that guards be posted before the tomb which is to hold Christ's body.

Act 16 Resurrection and Apotheosis. For the first time, action precedes a tableau. Roman guards see a light at the tomb. Mary Magdalene and the other women encounter an angel and recite the same lines as Quem Quaeritis. The final tableau shows Jesus resplendent in white with his apostles, angels, the Virgin Mary, and Moses. The Passion ends with a proclamation by the chorus.

== Length ==
The running time has varied due to the many revisions that have taken place through the years. In 2010 it had a running time of 5 hours, beginning at 2:30 pm and ending at 10:00 pm, with a meal break. It was staged a total of 102 days and ran from May 15 until October 3 that year. According to a record from 1930, the play then had running time of approximately seven hours. It started at 8:00 am and ended at 5:00 pm with a meal break. Audiences come from all over the world, often on package tours, the first instituted in 1870. Admission fees were first charged in 1790. Since 1930, the number of visitors has ranged from 420,000 to 530,000. Most tickets are sold as part of a package with one or two nights' accommodation.

== Frequency ==
The play is performed every ten years. From 1634 to 1674, it was performed in years ending in 4. Since 1680, it has been performed in years ending in the digit zero. There have been several cancellations and off-cycle performances.

Year scheduled	Year performed	Description
1770	—N/a	Prince-Elector Maximilian III Joseph banned all passion plays in Bavaria, saying, "The theatre stage is no place for the greatest secret of our holy religion."
1800	1800, 1801	After passion plays were banned in Bavaria in 1770, Oberammergau was given special permission to perform the passion play in 1780, 1790, and 1800. The 1800 play was disrupted by the War of the Second Coalition, and the town performed the play again in 1801 to pay back the debt.
1810	1811, 1815	The town's performance privilege was revoked after the off-cycle performance of 1801. After the text was re-written by Othmar Weis, the play was performed again in 1811 and 1815.
1870	1870, 1871	Interrupted by the Franco-Prussian War.
1920	1922	Delayed by the German defeat in World War I and the ensuing political and economic turmoil.
Off-cycle	1934	Additional performance to mark the 300th anniversary; rise of Nazi Party.
1940	—N/a	Cancelled due to World War II.
Off-cycle	1984	Additional performance to mark the 350th anniversary.
2020	2022	Delayed by the COVID-19 pandemic.

== The Passion Play Theatre ==
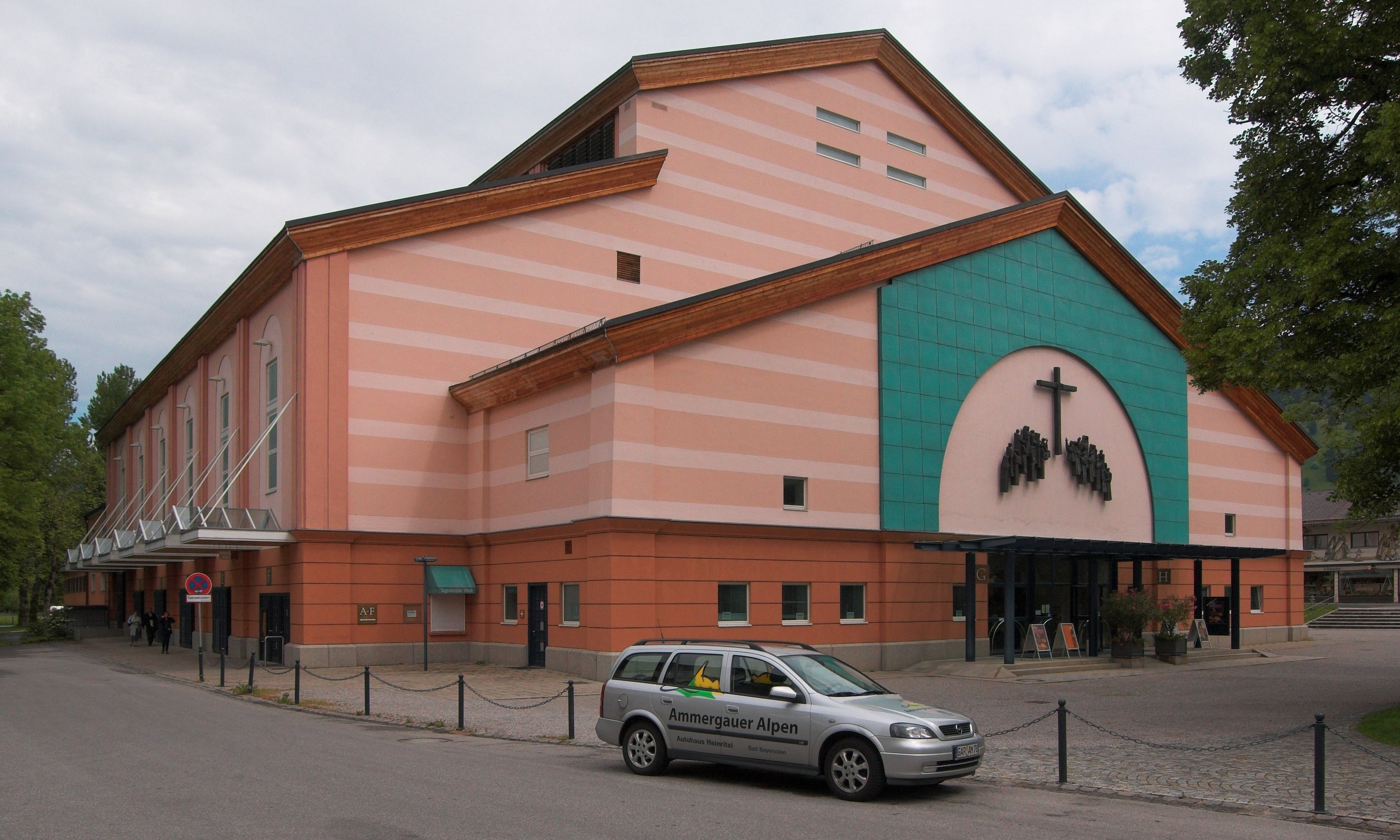
The Passion festival theater.

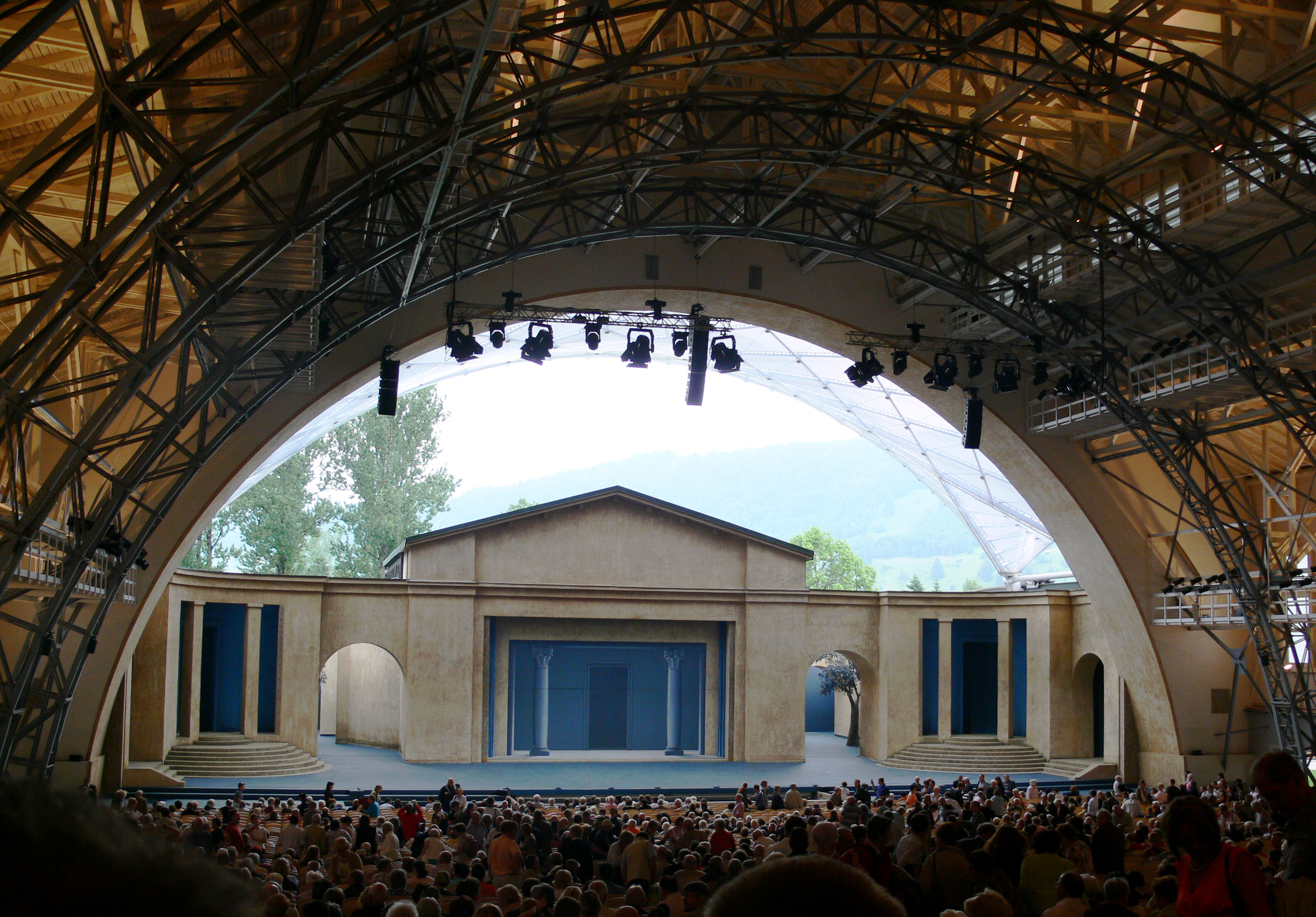
View of the stage during the 2000 production.

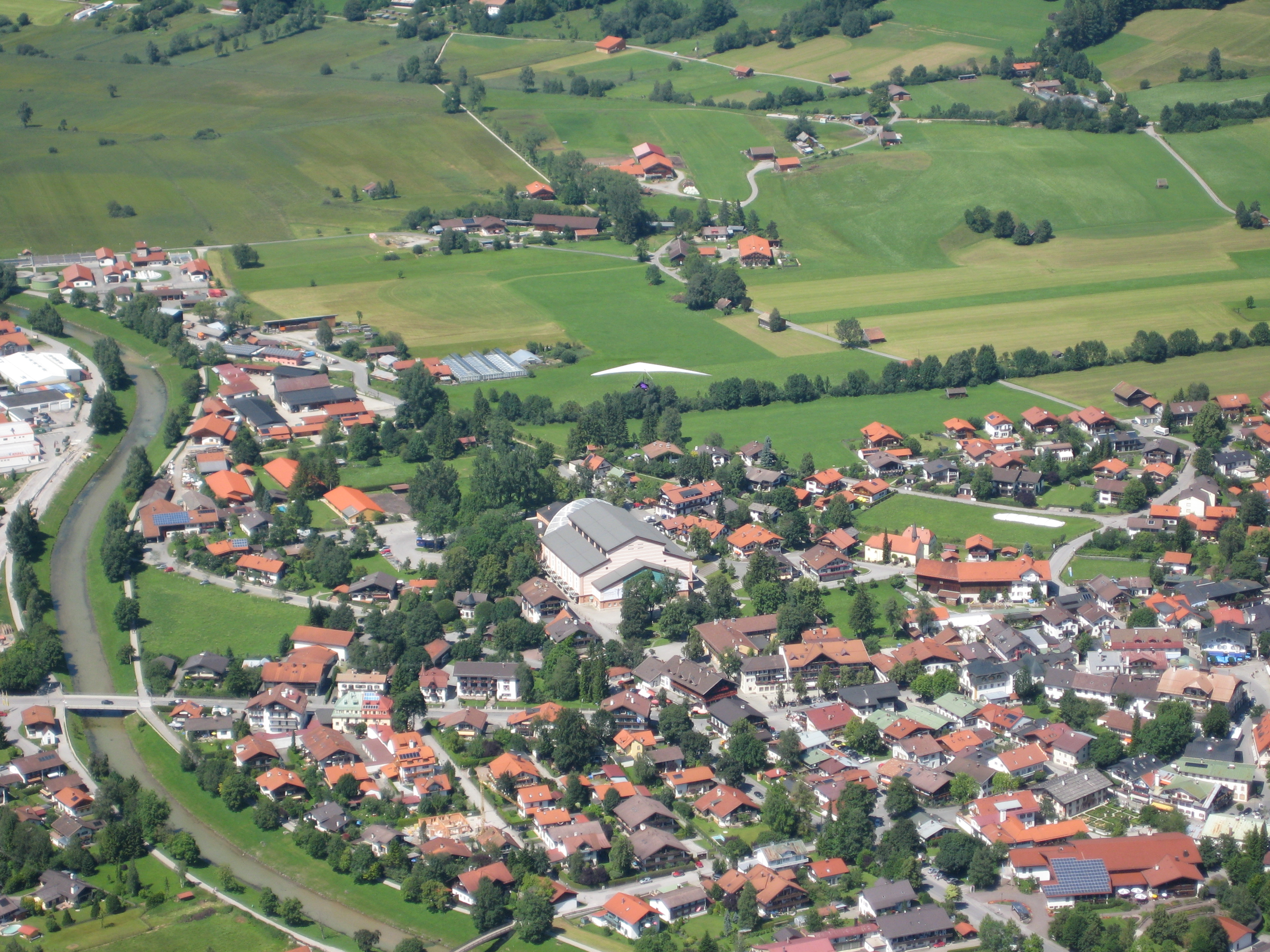
View of the Passion festival theater from the Kofel.

Oberammergau's original parish church proved to be far too small for performances of the Passion Play, so it was decided to hold the Play in the graveyard of the church, before the graves of the villagers who had died in the plague.

The fame of the Play must have spread quickly to the surrounding towns and villages for as early as 1674 records show that seats were to be provided for the audience.

Over the following years, sets and stage mechanics were added to the simple wooden stage structure. By the middle of the 18th century, it was obvious that the graveyard was also too small and a new venue was found on a field close by; however, the stage had to be specially built every year of the Play.

The first permanent stage seems to have been built in 1815 to a design by the then-local parish priest. In 1830 he was asked to help build a new, larger stage on the site of the present theatre. When it rained the audience got wet: umbrellas would have obscured the view of people sitting behind them.

However, in 1890 a new, purpose-built theatre was built and, apart from some of the scenes on the side of the stage, it would have looked much as it does today. It was ready in time for the 1900 performance, with the six-arched hall capable of holding over 4000 spectators.

The theatre was enlarged in time for the 1930 and 1934 seasons and whilst it was considered ugly and uncomfortable it was praised for its superb acoustics and sight of the stage.

Following the 1990 production both the interior and façade of the theatre were renovated and the stage mechanics modernised.

It has now been transformed – new more comfortable seating has been installed along with under-floor heating; cloakrooms have been extended; the foyer made accessible for wheelchair users; exhibition areas added; safety and toilet facilities improved. In 2010 a retractable glass roof was installed over the stage, which before then had been open to precipitation.

Today the theatre can seat an audience of over 4700.

== Antisemitism ==
Previous versions of the play were considered antisemitic in character, blaming the Jews for the murder of Christ. Adolf Hitler indicated, according to Abe Foxman, approval of these allegedly anti-Semitic elements in the Oberammergau Passion Play.

The modern script for the play was largely based on a mid-19th century version edited by pastor Alois Daisenberger. After Nazi Germany's defeat in World War II, the passion play came under increasing pressure from American Jews because of its anti-Semitic elements. In 1950, playwright Arthur Miller and composer Leonard Bernstein led a petition to cancel the passion play. However, the townspeople defiantly restaged the 1934 play. In the 1960s, Heinrich Böll, Günter Grass, Paul Celan, and other prominent intellectuals called for a boycott due to the play's antisemitism. In the 1970s, Oberammergau invited representatives from Jewish organizations to suggest edits to the play, and revisions were approved by a Christian theological advisor. However, only minor revisions were made in the 1980 play. Further change came in 1986, when generational turnover in the Community Council resulted in the 24-year-old Christian Stückl becoming director. Stückl narrowly outlasted an attempt by conservative members of the Community Council to fire him in 1989. Stückl, alongside dramaturgist Otto Huber, made considerable changes to the 1990 version to remove antisemitism from the text. The most radical changes came in 2000, when the story was reinterpreted as an inter-Jewish conflict, with some of the non-Christian Jews supporting and others opposing the crucifixion of Jesus. Muslims, whose religion was not founded until six centuries after the events of the Passion occurred, were allowed to perform in the Passion Play for the first time in 2000.

A 2010 review in the Jewish newspaper The Forward stated: "It is undeniably true that the play was virulently antisemitic through most of its history, and that it gained an extra dose of notoriety after Hitler endorsed the 1934 production." The review noted that the Anti-Defamation League (ADL) stated that the play "continues to transmit negative stereotypes of Jews" and that even the Catholic Church demanded changes to the play, to bring it more in line with church policies expressed by the Second Vatican Council, 1962–1965, in the Apostolic Constitution, Nostra aetate, 4, October 28, 1965 ("[T]he Jews should not be presented as rejected or accursed by God as if this followed from Sacred Scripture"). 2000 and 2010 director Christian Stückl told The Forward that Jesus "lived as a Jew." Therefore, in the revised play, Jesus and his disciples pray in Hebrew. After viewing the play, the reviewer was sympathetic to its artistry and felt less offended by its message than by "Wagner's antisemitic caricatures and religious mysticism". Nonetheless, the review quoted a report from the Council of Centers on Jewish-Christian Relations, which reviewed the 2010 script and objected that the play still makes use of "elements that are historically dubious" from the Gospels. The review stated that "It seems unfair" to accuse the play of antisemitism when it recounts material in Christianity's sacred texts and noted that the ADL's national director Abe Foxman had said that if the play is "about a Crucifixion in which the Jews kill Christ, you can never clean it up enough" to avoid an antisemitic message.

For the 2022 play, the American Jewish Committee convened an Academic Advisory Group led by their Director of Interreligious and Relations, composed of experts in the play, Christian-Jewish relations, New Testament studies, and German-Jewish relations. This group was created to recommend, through ongoing dialogue, paths by which the play's leadership can further advance a decades-long process to rid the play of any lingering anti-Jewish tropes. AJC has described the collaborative process with the Oberammergau community as productive: “The Oberammergau leadership desire for ongoing improvement is genuine,” even as “there remain concerns about points within the play that do not properly reflect" the range of first century Jewish opinion on Jesus's leadership. This reflects both the historic progress in Christian-Jewish relations in the past decades and also lingering tensions over the anti-Jewish implications of certain traditional Christian interpretations of the Gospels’ narratives of Jesus's conviction and execution.

The changes to the play since World War II have included the manner in which the play presents the charge of deicide, collective guilt, supersessionism and typology, as well as the following:

- the role of the Temple traders has been reduced;
- the "Rabbi" character has been eliminated and his lines given to another character;
- Jewish priests no longer wear horn shaped hats;
- Jesus has been addressed as Rabbi Yeshua;
- Jesus and others speak fragments of Hebrew prayers in the play;
- Jews are shown disputing with others about theological aspects of Judaism, not just about Jesus;
- Pilate has been made to appear more tyrannical and threatens Caiaphas, the Jewish high priest, and it is made clear that Caiaphas does not speak for all the Jews;
- Roman soldiers now stand guard at the gates when Jesus makes his entrance to Jerusalem;
- Jesus' supporters have been added to the screaming crowd outside Pilate's palace;
- Judas is portrayed as being duped into betraying Jesus;
- removing the line "His blood is upon us and also upon our children's children" (from Matthew 27:25), and "Ecce homo" (Behold [only] a man);
- Peter, when questioned by Nathaniel regarding abandoning Judaism replies, "No! We don't want that! Far be it from us to abandon Moses and his law"; and
- at the Last Supper Jesus recites the blessing over the wine in Hebrew.

=== Nazi support of 1934 play ===
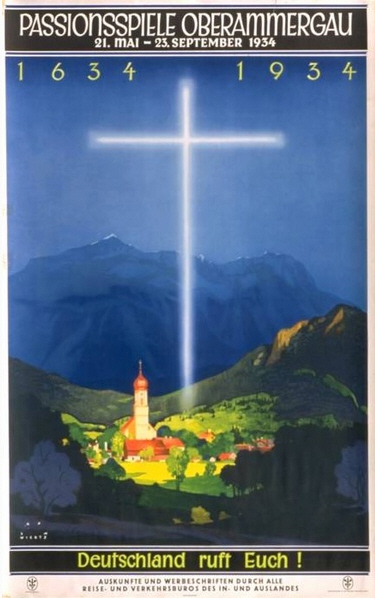
1934 poster

The special jubilee season of the Oberammergau Passion Play in 1934, marking the 300th anniversary of the original vow to stage the play every ten years thereafter, was the first and only performance after the Nazi regime's rise to power the previous year. Among other things, the Ministry of Public Enlightenment and Propaganda ordered the official poster for the jubilee season amended to include the message Deutschland ruft Euch! ("Germany is calling you!"), and the Kraft durch Freude scheme's discount-travel programme offered special cut-rate packages for the Passion Play, including train fare, tickets and accommodations.

Official propaganda described the Passion Play as "peasant drama ... inspired by the consecrating power of the soil", Hitler attended a performance and praised its themes. An attempt to rewrite the Passion Play script to bring it into line with Nazi ideology was rejected, however, by the more conservative element.

== Catholic Church certification ==
Missio Canonica is a canonical certification necessary for preaching. In 19th-century Germany, it was extended to teaching as well. In 1922 the Catholic Church gave the play a Missio Canonica. It is a certification that the beliefs of the Catholic Church are being taught or, in this case, being presented. In 1970, the Catholic Church removed its Missio Canonica approval for the play and demanded changes to it in line with its statement Nostra aetate on religious pluralism and rejection of antisemitism.

== See also ==
- Long-running plays (non-musicals)
- Liturgical drama
- Medieval theatre
- Mystery Play of Elche
- Škofja Loka Passion Play

== Scripts ==
- Joseph Alois Daisenberger: Complete official text of the Oberammergau passion-play. (1900) Translated by Frances Manette Jackson. Oberammergau: Georg Lang sel. Erben, 1900 at Google Books
- The Passion Play in Oberammergau. A Religious Play in Three Parts and with 24 Tableaux. With use of the Old Text Written by J. A. Daisenberger at the Time Ecclesiastical Councillor in Oberammergau. Official Total Text for the Year 1922 Revised and Reedited by the Community of Oberammergau at Google Books
