= Eugen Papst =

German composer and music teacher

Eugen Papst (24 December 1886 – 2 January 1956) was a German composer and music teacher.

== Life ==
Papst was born in Oberammergau, the son of an educator and head teacher of the same name, Eugen Papst (1855-1923), after whom the Eugen-Papst-Förderschule in Germering was later named. He then attended the teacher training seminar in Freising and studied at the University of Music and Performing Arts Munich from 1907.

In 1910 he worked at the theater in Olsztyn and from 1911 in Bern as musical director of the city theater. In 1922 he was called to Hamburg, where he conducted the Hamburg Philharmonic together with Karl Muck until it was disbanded by the Nazis in 1934. Papst first went to Münster as general music director in the fall of 1934, but by 1935 he had already become director of the Cologne Men's Choral Society and shortly afterwards, with the support of his friend Richard Strauss, also became municipal general music director of the Gürzenich Orchestra Cologne as successor to Hermann Abendroth. He also taught conducting at the Cologne Academy of Music. After the end of the war, there were disputes over his position as general music director because the City of Cologne appointed Günter Wand in 1946 despite an ongoing contract with Papst. In his opinion, Papst became more and more "the musical leading figure of the eternalists".

Pope accepted an offer to the Hochschule für Musik Detmold, where he held master classes in conducting.

For the 1950 Oberammergau Passion Play, he created an arrangement of the Passion music by Rochus Dedler (1779-1822), which was played unchanged until 1990 and is still in use today with revisions and additions by the present musical director Markus Zwink.

His other works include orchestral works, choruses and Lieder, which have only been partially published.

Papst died in Bern on 2 January 1956, aged 69.

== Honours ==
- In 1933, Pabst was awarded the Johannes Brahms Medal of Hambourg.

== Bibliography ==
- Letters von E. Papst from 1929 to 1934, Staatsarchiv Leipzig, C.F.Peters Verlag.

== Sources ==
- Biography by Monika Reger, deutsche-biographie.de. Accessed 18 February 2024.
