= Rochus Dedler =

German composer

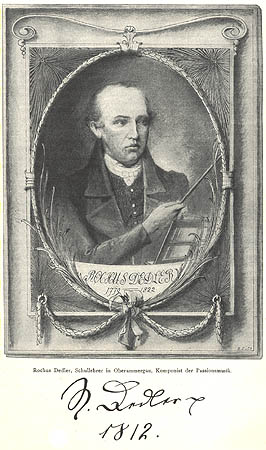
Rochus Dedler

Rochus Dedler (15 January 1779 – 17 October 1822) was a German composer. He is best known as the author of a stage music for the version of the Oberammergau Passion Play by Father Othmar Weis.

== Life ==
Dedler was born on 15 January 1779 in Oberammergau. His father Johann (1737–1811) and his mother Barbara (1736–1825) ran the inn "Zum weißen Lamm" there.

Originally Dedler was destined for a spiritual profession. He was a choirboy at Rottenbuch Abbey and went to Munich for further education, where he graduated in 1798 from the (present) Wilhelmsgymnasium (Munich). Subsequently, he began the obligatory basic studies (philosophy) at the affiliated Lyceum, but then returned to Rottenbuch to work as chamber scribe of the prelate. In 1802, however, he gave up his spiritual career and took a position as a teacher and choir director in Oberammergau.

Dedler was married to Maria Josepha, née Sepp, from Uffing (1779–1824). Together they had three sons and six daughters.

Dedler died on 17 October 1822 at age 43 due to a lung disease in Oberföhring, where his brother was a pastor, and was buried there at the cemetery of St. Lorenz. A path leading past the cemetery is named "Rochus-Dedler-Weg" in his honour. In 1825 his mother Barbara was buried next to him. An epitaph commemorates the two of them.

== Work ==
Dedler's main work is the stage music composed in 1810 for the Oberammergau Passions Play, for which the Ettal Benedictine priest Othmar Weis had written a new text version after the prohibition of the performance in 1810. The stage music contains an overture, arias, duets and choirs and shows influences of Joseph Haydn and Wolfgang Amadeus Mozart especially in the orchestration. In the new version, the Passion was first performed in 1811 under the direction of Othmar Weis. The music was revised in 1950 by Eugen Papst and is still played to the Passion with some changes and additions from 2000 and 2010.

Among the other works of Dedler are:

- German High Mass in D, also called Pollinger Messe
- Anniversary Deo
- Missae breves cum totidem offertoriis pro omni tempore
- Symphony in B flat major (circa 1799)
- Symphony in D Major
