= Kofel =

Mountain in the Bavarian Alps, Germany

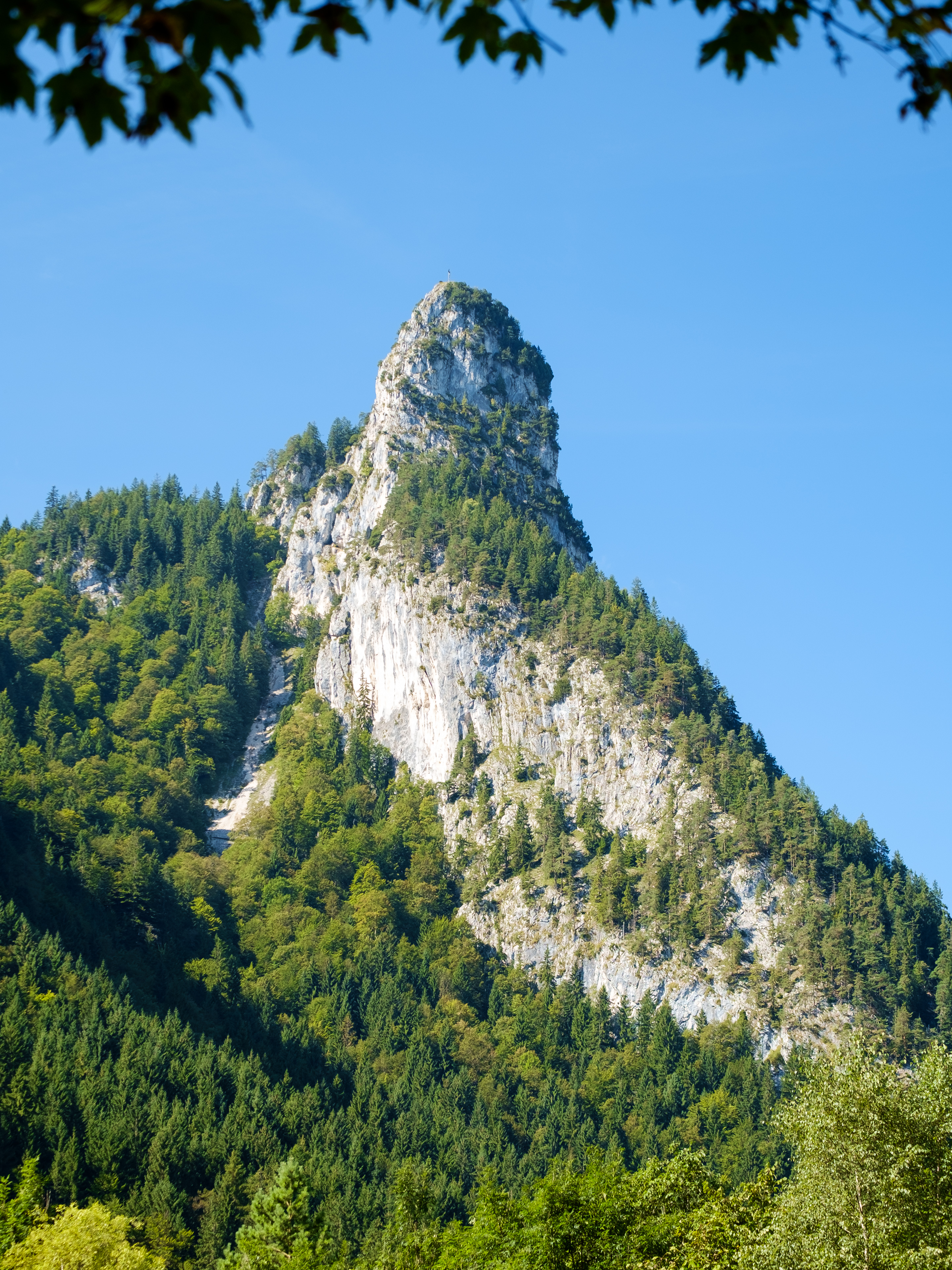
- Kofel, seen from the East

Highest point
- Elevation: 1,342 m (4,403 ft)
- Coordinates: 47°35′13″N 11°03′35″E

Geography
- Location within Bavaria
- Location: Bavaria, Germany

The Kofel is a 1,342-metre (4,403 ft) mountain in the Bavarian Alps of Germany. With its distinctive white head it is the signature mountain of the town of Oberammergau, from which the summit is only about one km away. Due to its prominent location and unique shape it can be identified from a considerable distance both from the direction of Ettal and that of Unterammergau.

== Routes ==
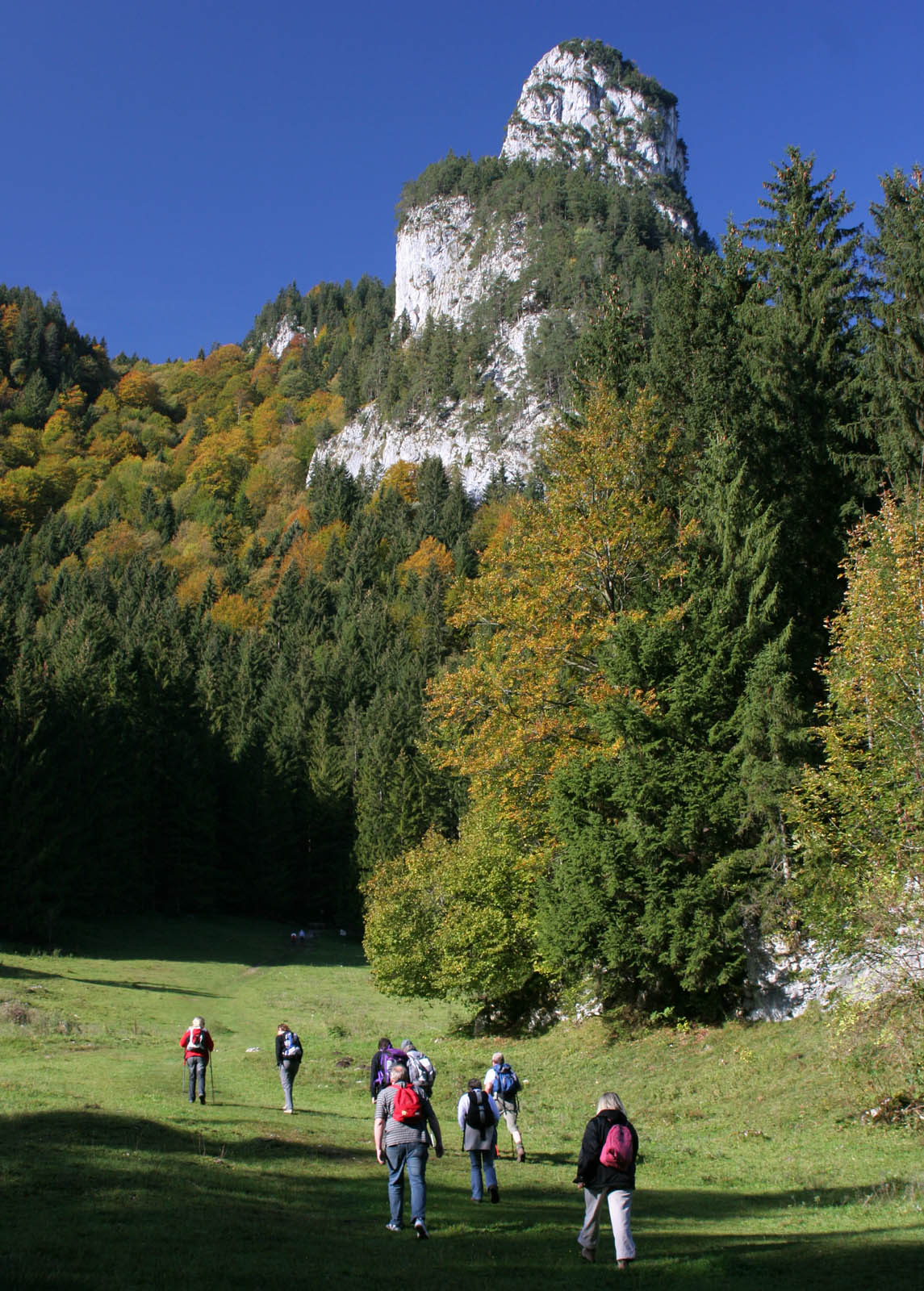
View from the Kälberplatte

The direct route starts at the Döttenbühl parking lot (altitude 840 metres (2,760 ft)), near the Oberammergau cemetery. After crossing a meadow called the Kälberplatte, with a view looking up to the imposing end of the climb, the greater part of the ascent is a wooded switchback footpath (with one clamber across a scree field) up to a rain shelter. From there, one starts climbing to the rocky summit.

Another possibility for the ascent is a traverse over the Kolbensattelalm (1,028 metres (3,373 ft), double chair lift) and the Königssteig (King's trail). By combining different routes the Kofel may be circumambulated.

== Secured route to the summit ==
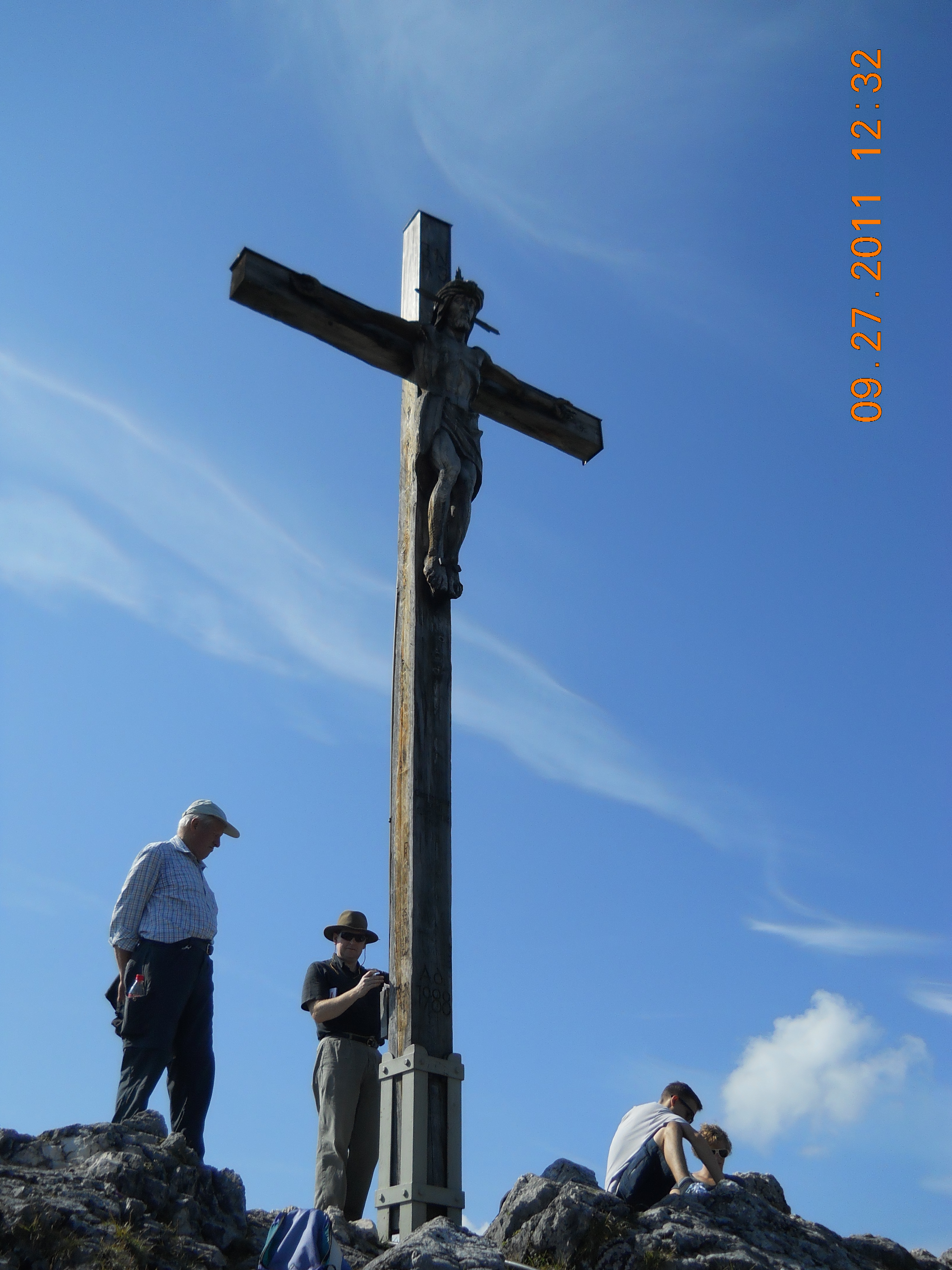
The summit cross atop the Kofel

The last hundred meters of elevation are covered in a summit climb which is suitable even for families with children, provided they are sure-footed and have a head for heights. Steep and exposed sections are secured by fixed steel cables. After rain there is an increased risk of slipping in the rockier sections. In the Hüsler Alpine Climbing Atlas the ascent is rated a KS1 secured climb.

From the cross at the peak there is, weather permitting, a panoramic view including Ettal and both Ober- and Unterammergau.

== In popular culture ==
American Eugenia Jones Bacon wrote about a rock she said had an image reminiscent of Jesus on it from the mountain (A Stone from Oberammergau: With a Description of This Wonderful Phenomenon. New York: J. Pott & Co. (1891); The Stone Portrait of the Man of Sorrows, An Ideal of Patient Suffering. London: Lamley (1896); and The Real Stone Face; or, Suffering Depicted by Nature. Atlanta: Foote & Davies (1899). The rock was exhibited at the Vatican and Buckingham Palace.
