= Oberammergau =

- Municipality
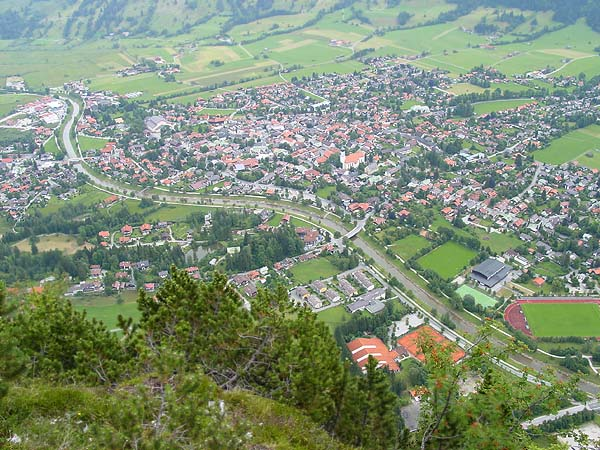
- Oberammergau from the summit of Kofel

- Coat of arms

- Location of Oberammergau within Garmisch-Partenkirchen district
- Interactive map of Oberammergau
- Location within Germany Location within Bavaria
- Coordinates: 47°35′48″N 11°03′52″E
- Country: Germany
- State: Bavaria
- Admin. region: Oberbayern
- District: Garmisch-Partenkirchen

Government
  - Mayor (2020–26): Andreas Rödl (CSU)
  - Governing parties: CSU

Area
  - Total: 30.06 km^{2} (11.61 sq mi)
- Elevation: 837 m (2,746 ft)

Population (2025-12-31)
  - Total: 5,064
  - Density: 168.5/km^{2} (436.3/sq mi)
- Time zone: UTC+01:00 (CET)
  - Summer (DST): UTC+02:00 (CEST)
- Postal codes: 82487
- Dialling codes: 08822
- Vehicle registration: GAP
- Website: www.gemeinde-oberammergau.de

Oberammergau is a municipality in the district of Garmisch-Partenkirchen, in Bavaria, Germany. The small town on the Ammer River is known for its woodcarvers and woodcarvings, for its NATO School, and around the world for its tradition of mounting decennial Passion Plays since 1633.

== History ==
=== Passion Play ===
The Oberammergau Passion Play was first performed in 1634. According to local legend, the play is performed every 10 years because of a vow made by the inhabitants of the village that if God spared them from the effects of the bubonic plague then sweeping the region, they would perform a passion play at that interval. A man traveling back to the town for Christmas allegedly brought the plague with him by accident. The man purportedly died from the plague, and it began spreading throughout Oberammergau. After the vow was made, according to tradition, not another inhabitant of the town died from the plague. All of the town members who were still suffering from the plague are said to have recovered.

The play is now performed in years ending with a zero, as well as in 1934, which was the 300th anniversary, and 1984, which was the 350th anniversary (though the 1920 performance was postponed to 1922 due to postwar economic conditions, and the 1940 performance was cancelled due to the onset of the Second World War in 1939). The 2020 play was postponed to 2022 due to the outbreak of COVID-19. It involves over 2,000 actors, singers, instrumentalists, and technicians, all residents of the village.

== Economy ==
=== Tourism ===
About half the inhabitants of Oberammergau took part in the once-a-decade Passion Play in 2010.

Over 2,000 villagers performed the story of the Passion of Jesus for the audiences from around the world. This was a labor-intensive community enterprise, in which only natives of the village could participate. Performances have taken place between mid-May and early October.

The play has a major economic impact on Oberammergau. There is a local expression "Die Passion zahlt" ("The Passion Play will pay for it") in explaining how the Oberammergau community financed construction of a new community swimming pool, community centre, and other civic improvements. Since 1930, the number of visitors has ranged from 420,000 to 530,000. Most tickets are sold as part of a package with one or two nights' accommodation.

=== Traditional art ===
The village is also known as the home of a long tradition of woodcarving; the Bavarian State Woodcarving School is located there. Among the celebrated former students is the German artist Wolfram Aichele. His processional church staff depicting Christ on a donkey can be seen in the church of St Peter and St Paul. The streets of central Oberammergau are home to dozens of woodcarver shops, with pieces ranging from religious subjects, to toys, to humorous portraits.

Oberammergau is also famous for its "Lüftlmalerei," or frescoes, of traditional Bavarian themes, fairy tales, religious scenes or architectural trompe-l'œil found on many homes and buildings. Lüftlmalerei is common in Upper Bavaria and its name may be derived from an Oberammergau house called Zum Lüftl, which was the home of facade painter Franz Seraph Zwinck (1748–1792).

The village is also known for its religious art. A wooden statue of Our Lady of Good Voyage from Oberammergau stands in the Seaport Shrine in Boston, Massachusetts.

== Transport ==
Oberammergau lies near the Bundesstraße 23, part of the Deutsche Alpenstrasse route. Its single-track, single platform railway station is the terminus of the Ammergau Railway. Several aerial lifts climb the nearby mountains.

== Military ==
The Conrad von Hötzendorf Kaserne was built just east of the village in 1935–37 as a base for the signals detachment (Gebirgs-Nachrichten-Abteilung 54) of the Mountain Brigade. In October 1943, the barracks were taken over by the Messerschmitt company as a research and development site; 37 km (23 mi) of tunnels were bored into the neighboring Laber mountain for engine production facilities, and a winter sports hotel was also taken over. In all, Messerschmitt had 500 employees in the design department and about 1,300 more in the factory. At the end of the Second World War, the Messerschmitt design department was visited by both U.S. and British scientific missions, as well as by teams from Bell (who stayed for five weeks) and de Havilland. Among the German staff interviewed by the Fedden Mission were Woldemar Voigt, Messerschmitt's chief designer, Hans Hornung, and Joseph Helmschrott.

After the war, the Americans occupied the kaserne, renaming it Hawkins Barracks and making it the primary facility of U.S. Army School Europe; over the next three decades schools in specialties ranging from military police to nuclear weapons handling were located there. The base reverted to German Army control and its original name in 1974.

NATO School, formerly NATO Weapons Systems School, the alliance's principal training and education facility on the operational level, has been located at Hawkins Barracks/Hötzendorf Kaserne since 1953.

== Tongue-twister ==
The name of the village (as well as that of neighbouring Unterammergau) appears in a well-known German tongue-twister, often sung as a round:

- German: Heut' kommt der Hans zu mir, / freut sich die Lies. / Ob er aber über Oberammergau, / oder aber über Unterammergau, / oder aber überhaupt nicht kommt, / das ist net g'wiß!
- English: Hans will come join with me, / rejoices Lies (Lies is most likely the shortened form (pet name) of the name Elizabeth). / If he comes by way of Oberammergau / or by way of Unterammergau, / or if at all he comes, / that is not sure!

== Gallery ==
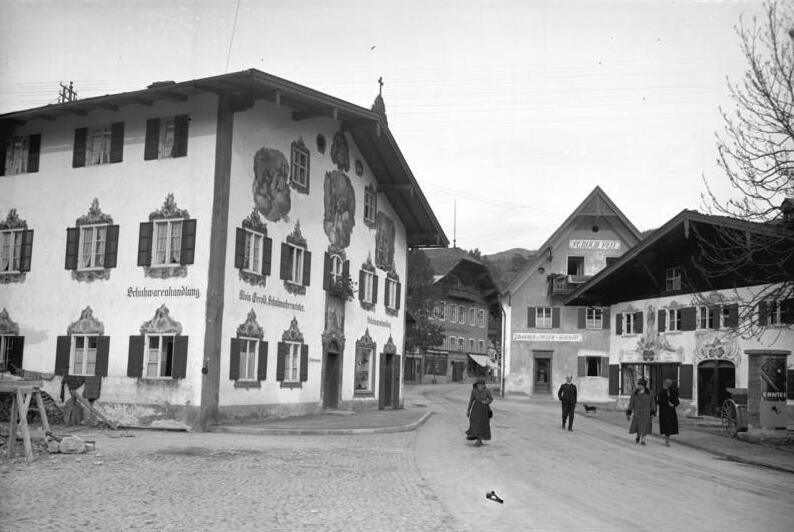
View of a street in Oberammergau, March 1930

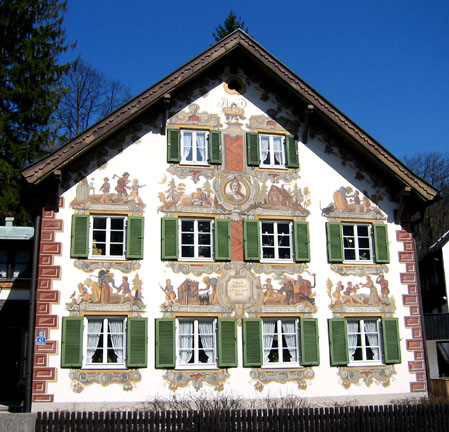
Example of Lüftlmalerei decorating homes in Oberammergau

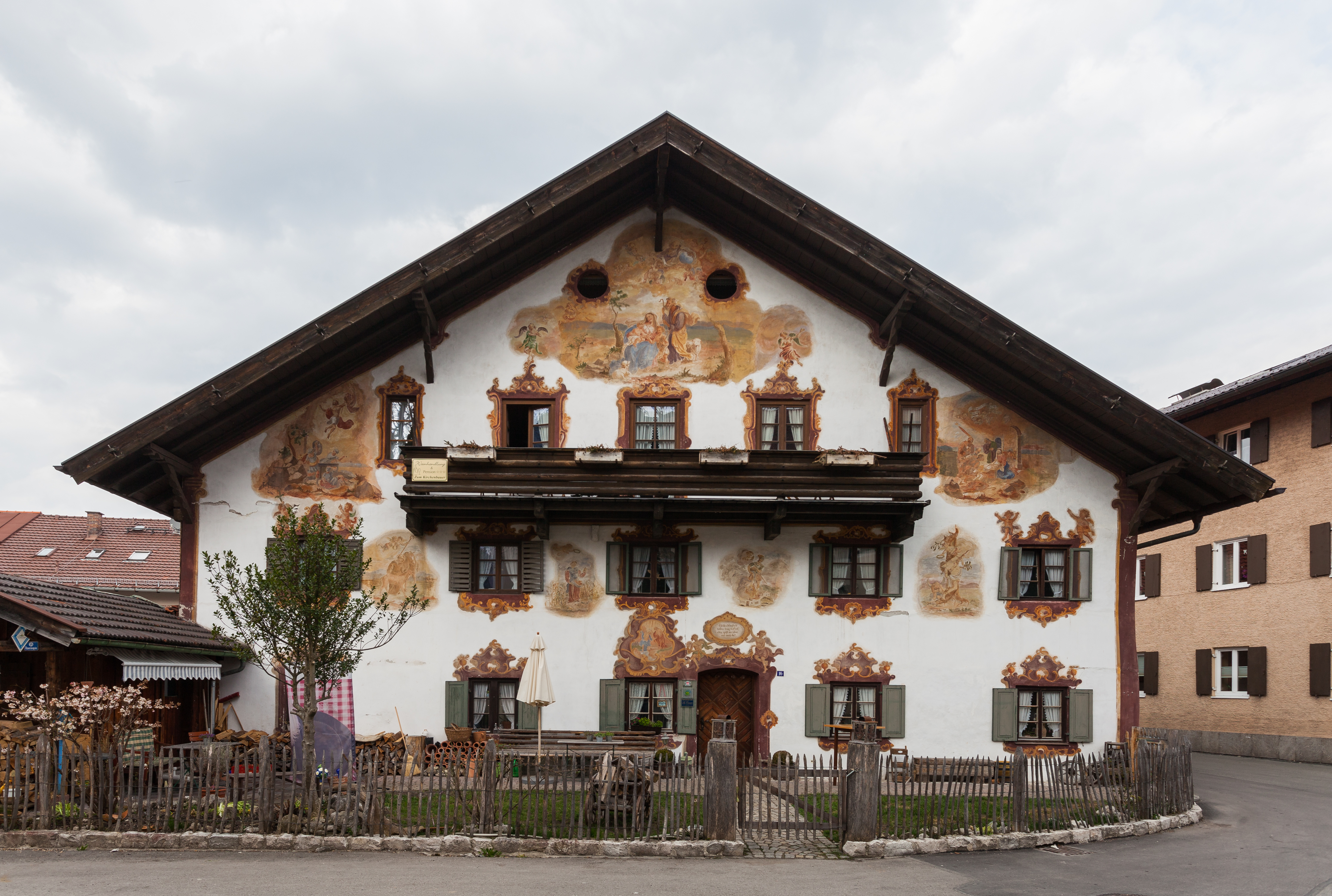
Example of Lüftlmalerei decorating homes in Oberammergau

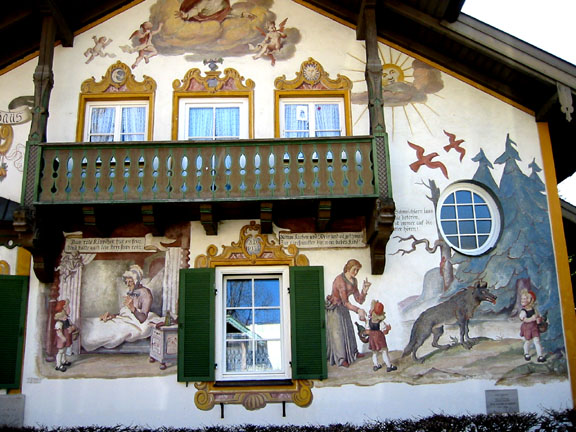
Scene of Little Red Riding Hood decorating a home in Oberammergau

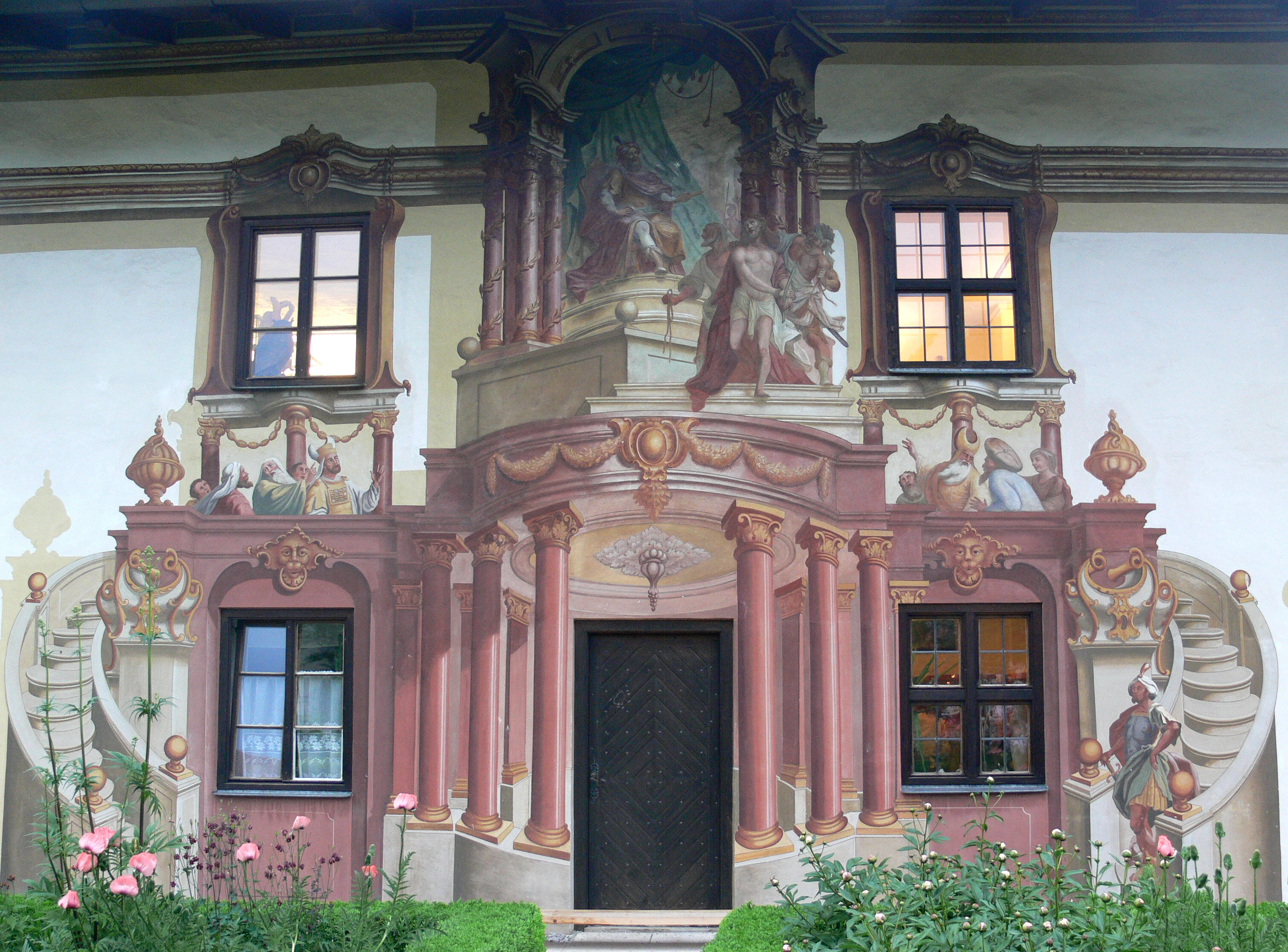
Lüftlmalerei adorning the facade of the Pilatushaus

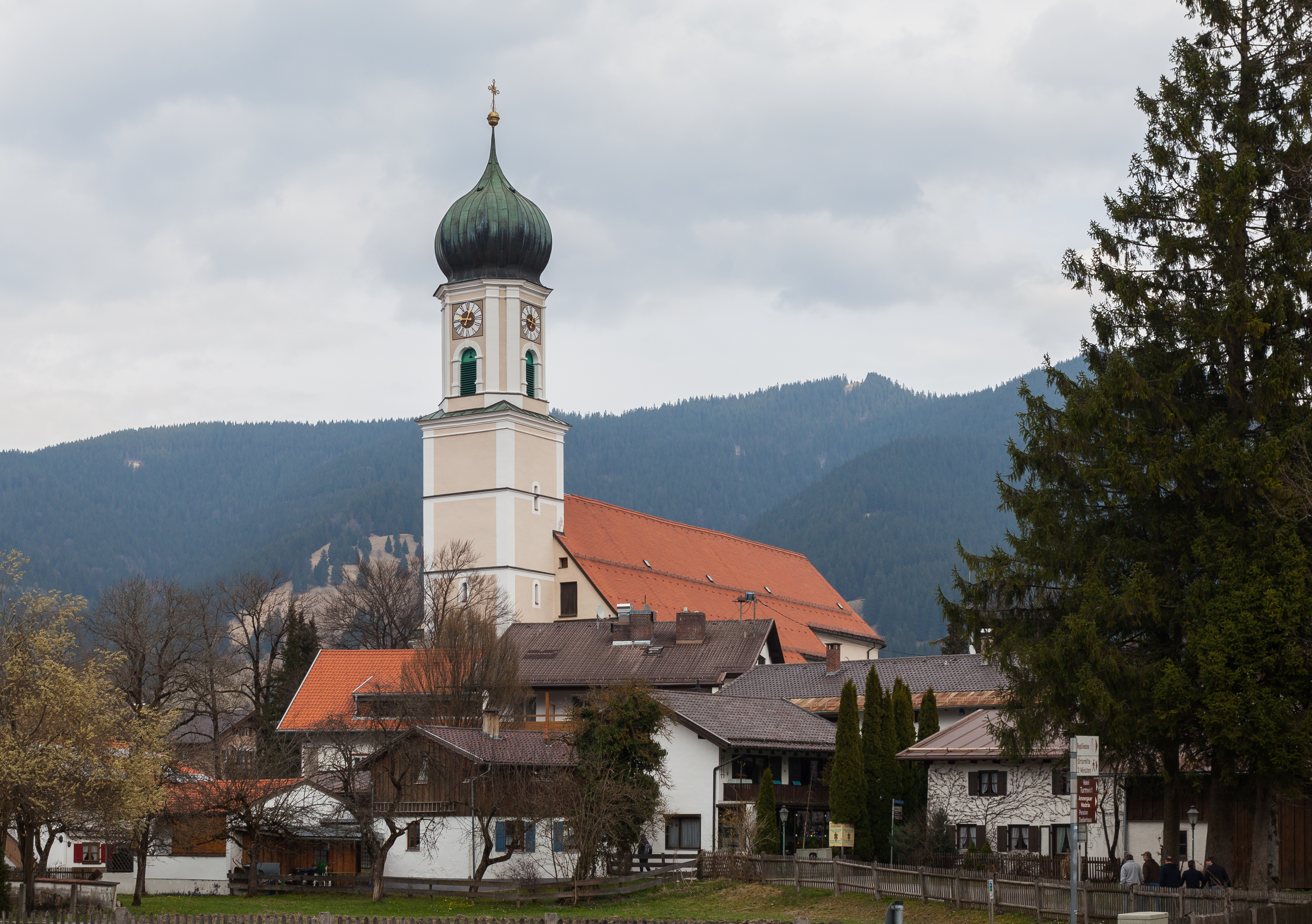
The parish church of St. Peter and Paul

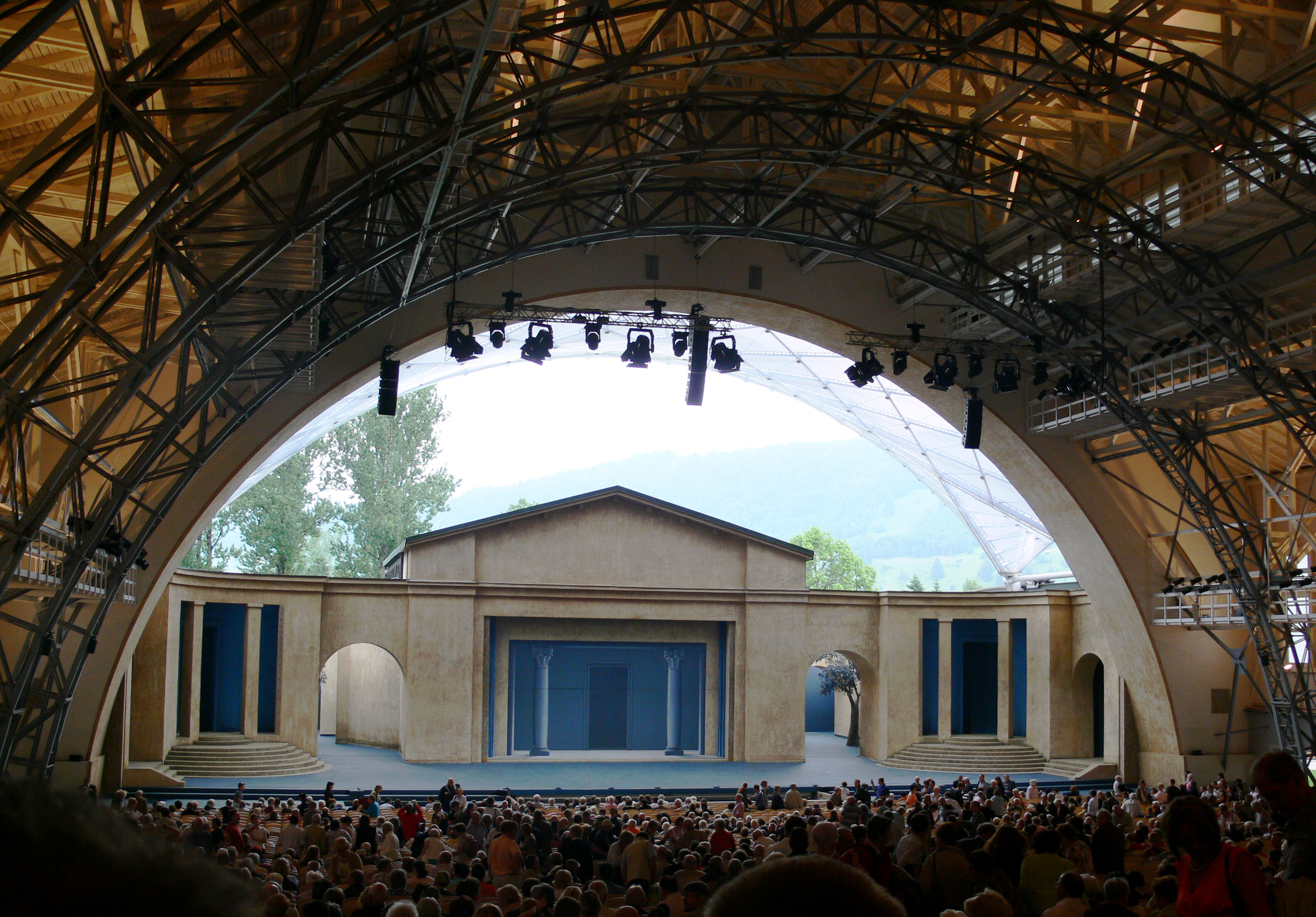
View of the stage during the 2000 production

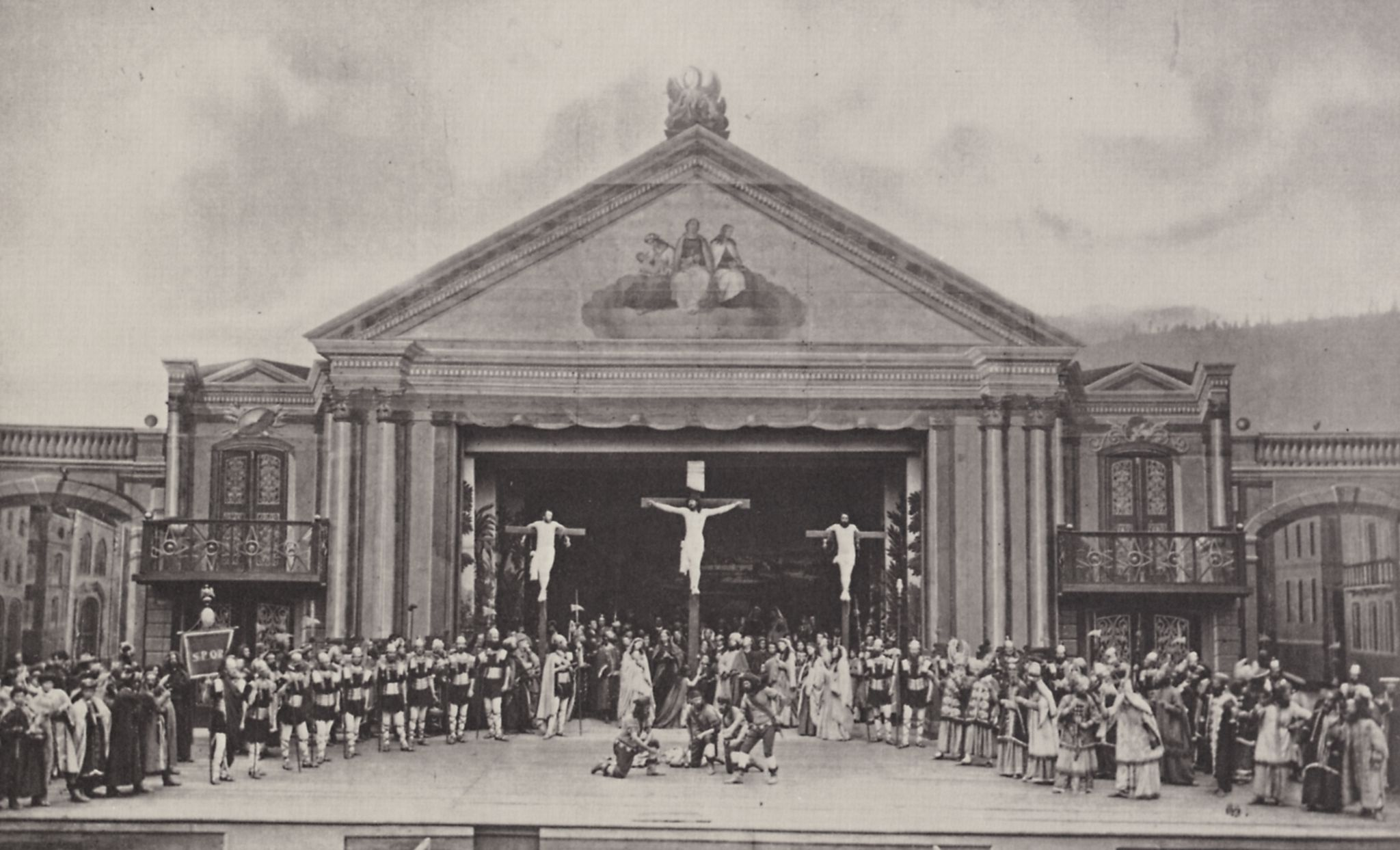
Crucifixion scene from the 1870 Passion Play

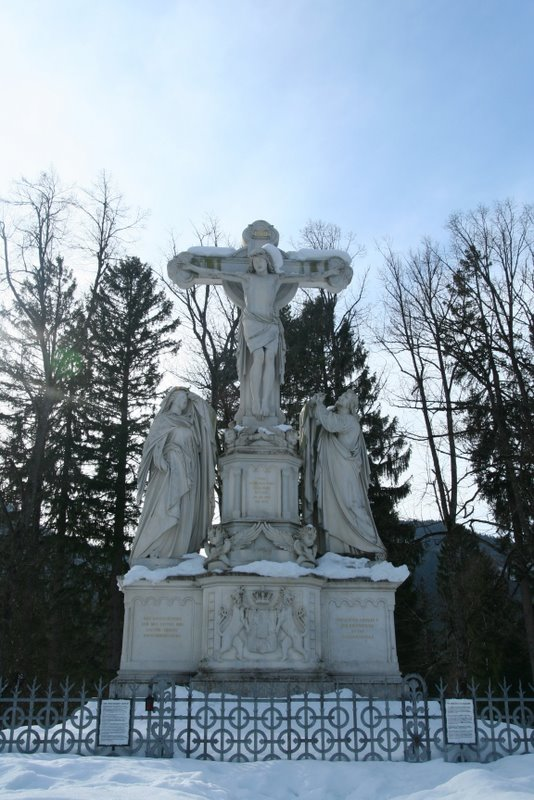
The Kreuzigungsgruppe

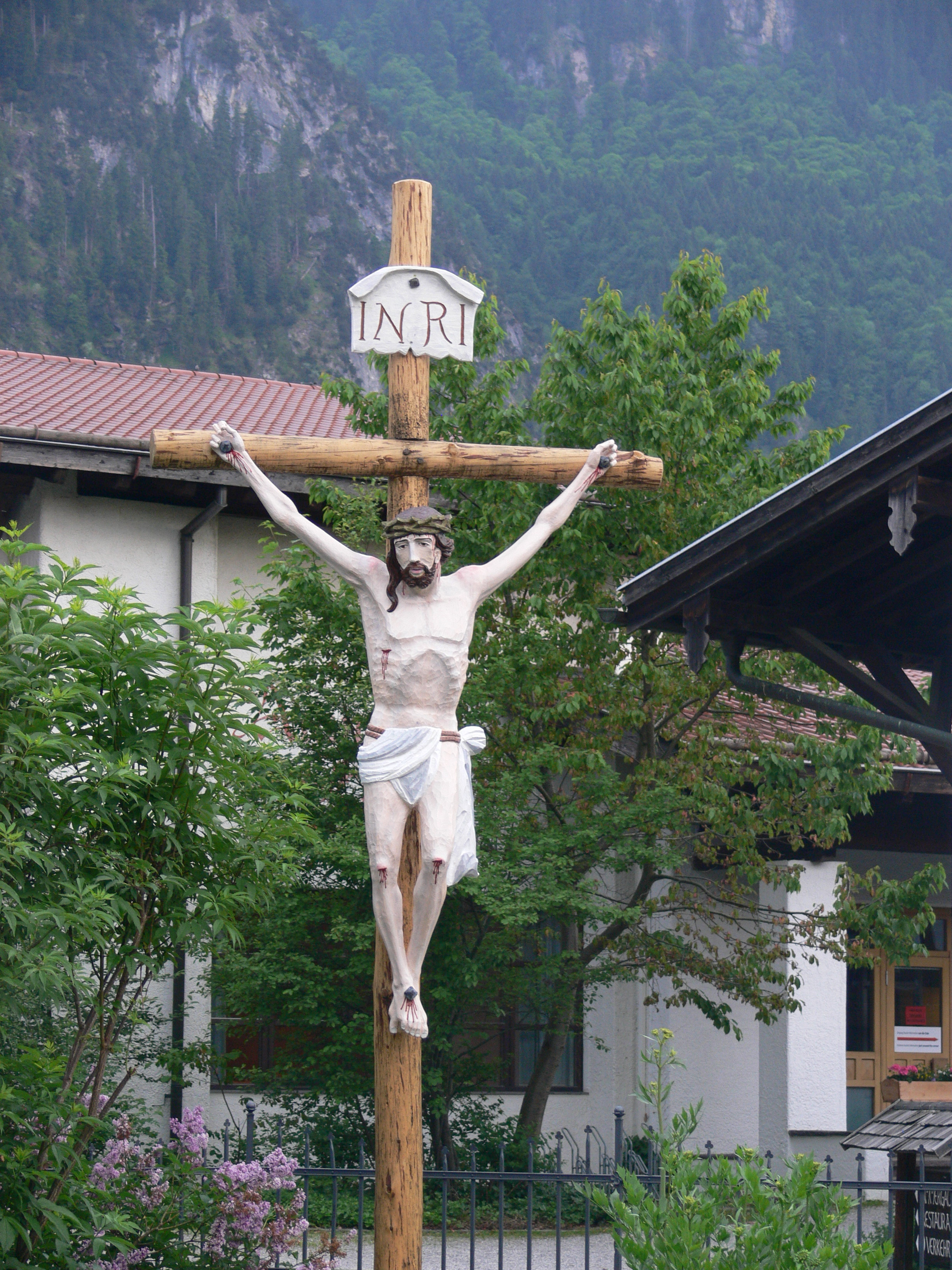
Traditional crucifix beside the Pilatushaus

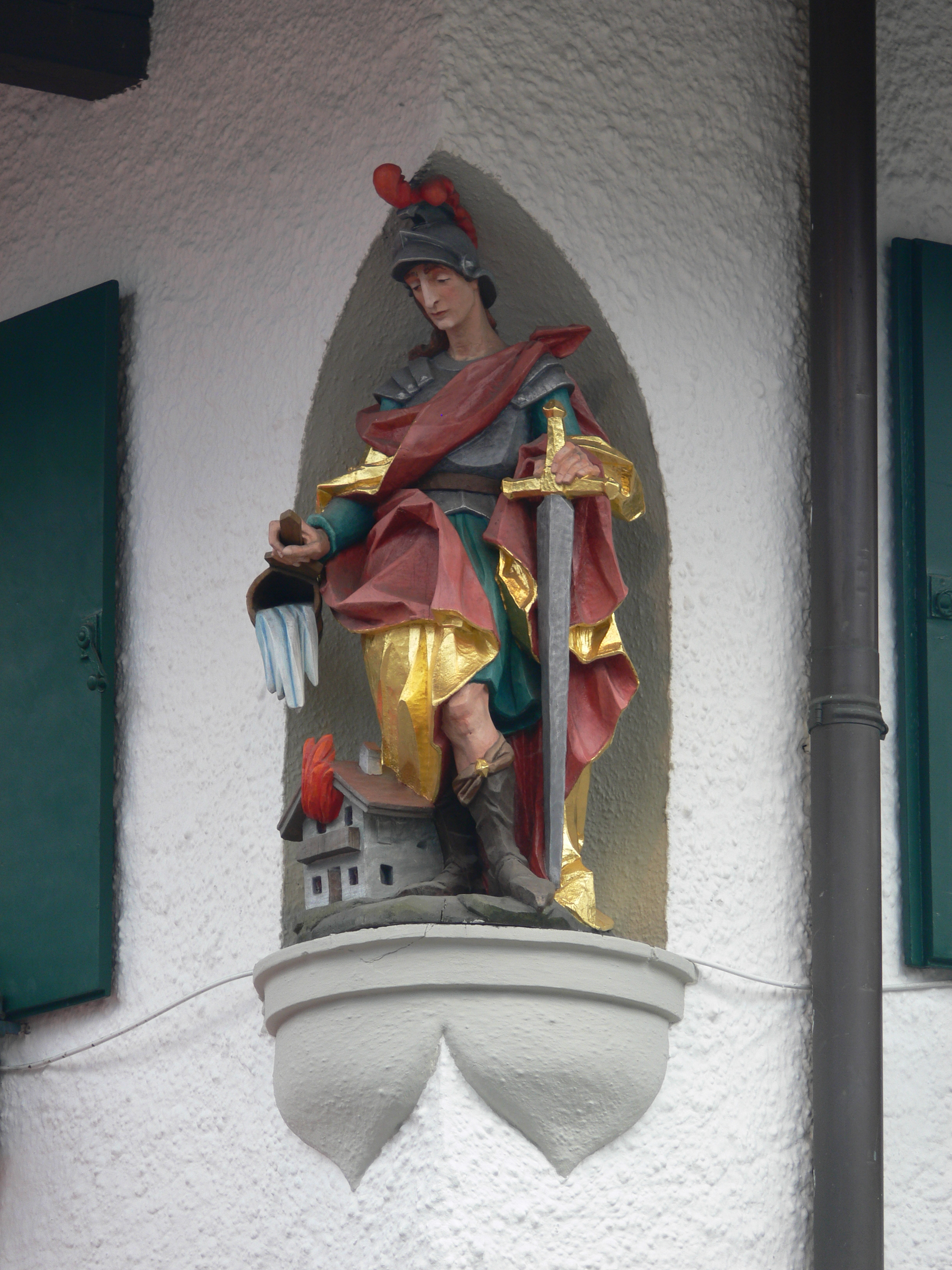
Woodcarving of St Florian

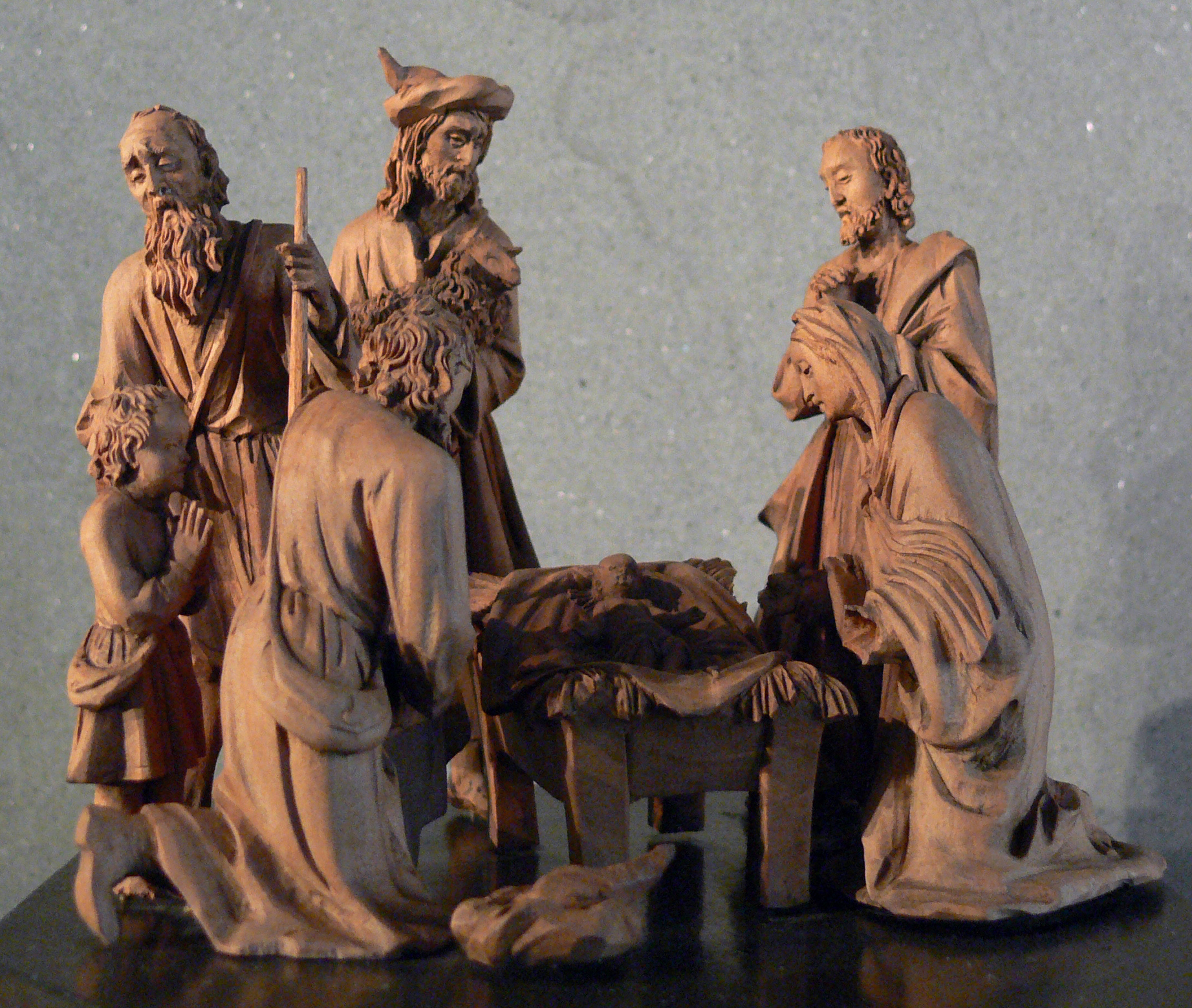
Nativity group, ca. 1840

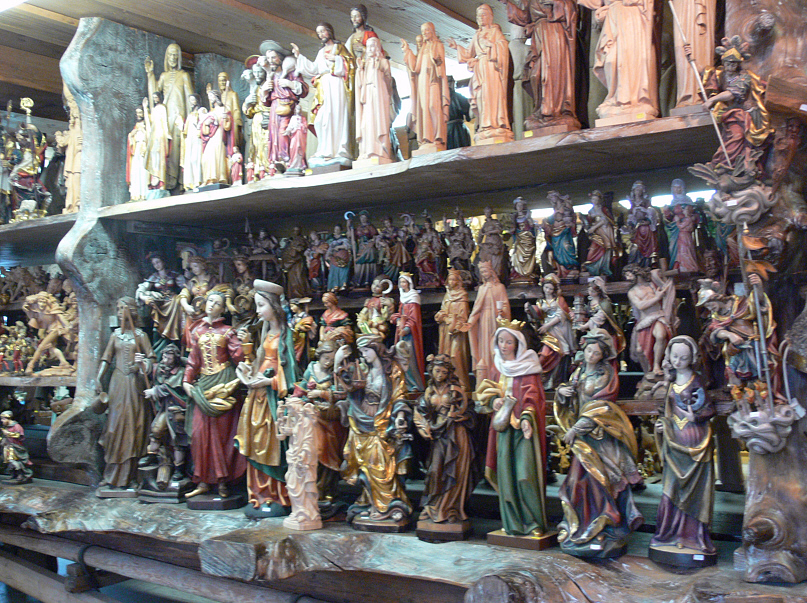
Woodcarvings for sale

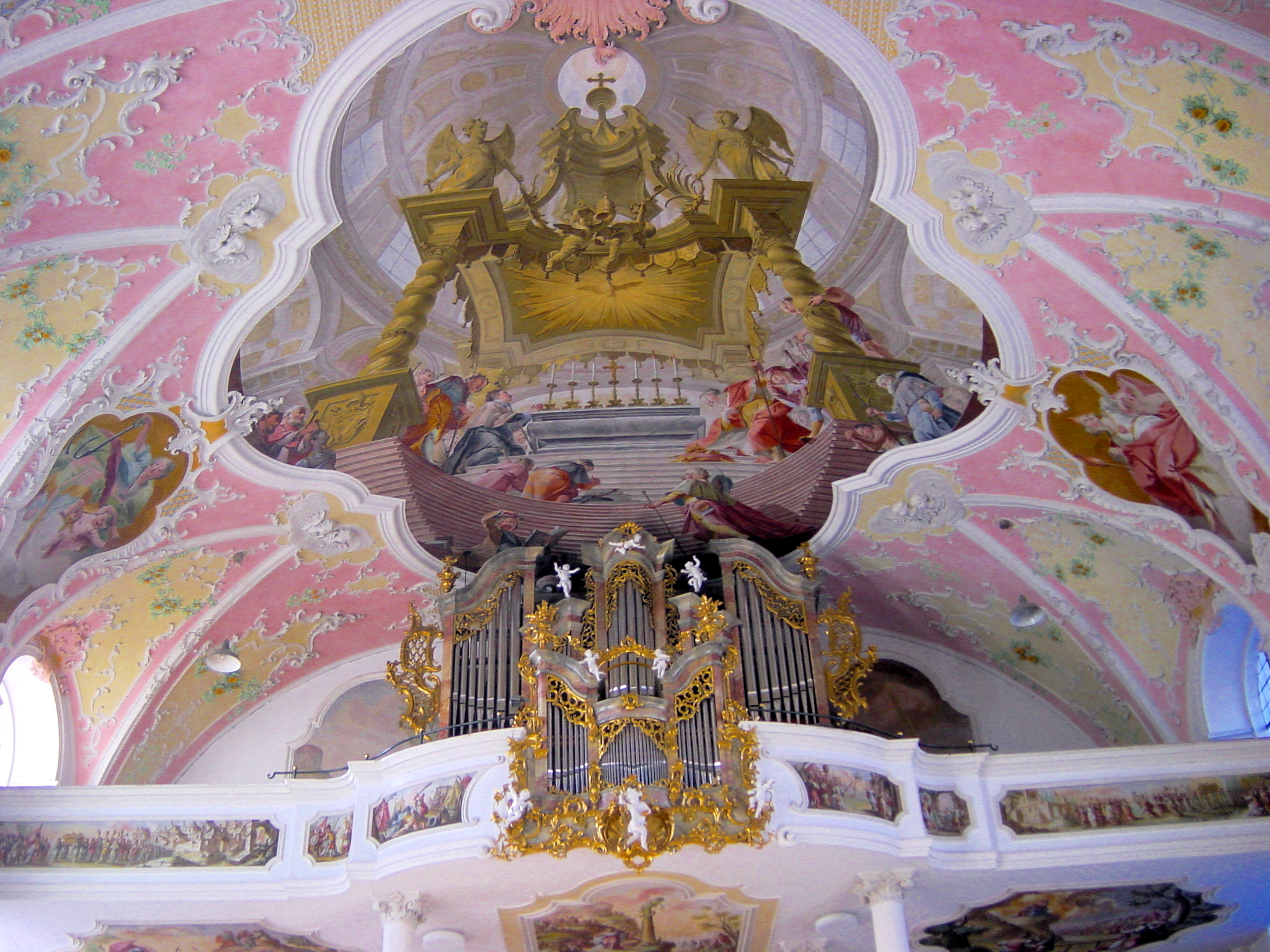
Parish church: Organ gallery

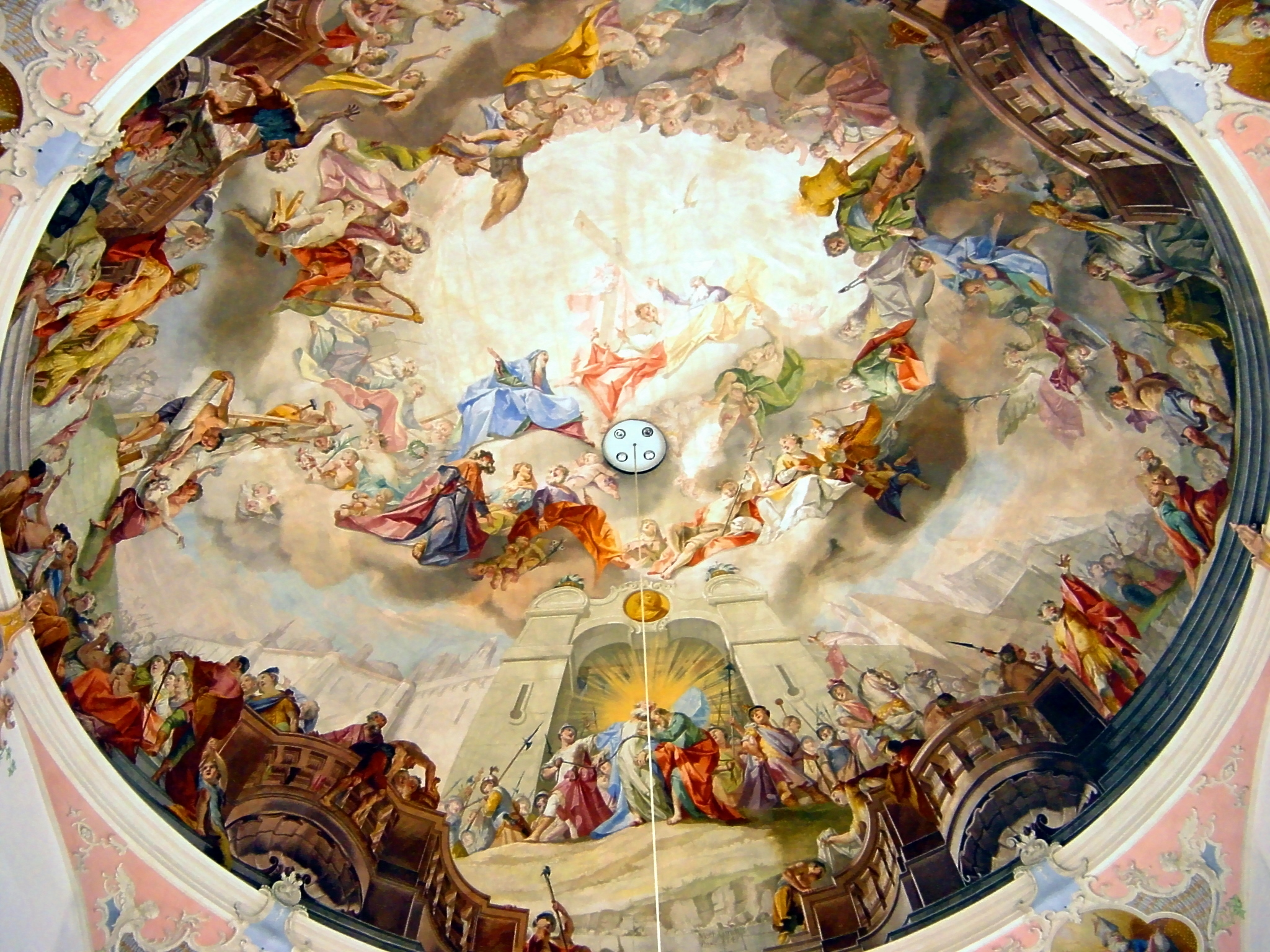
Parish church: Dome

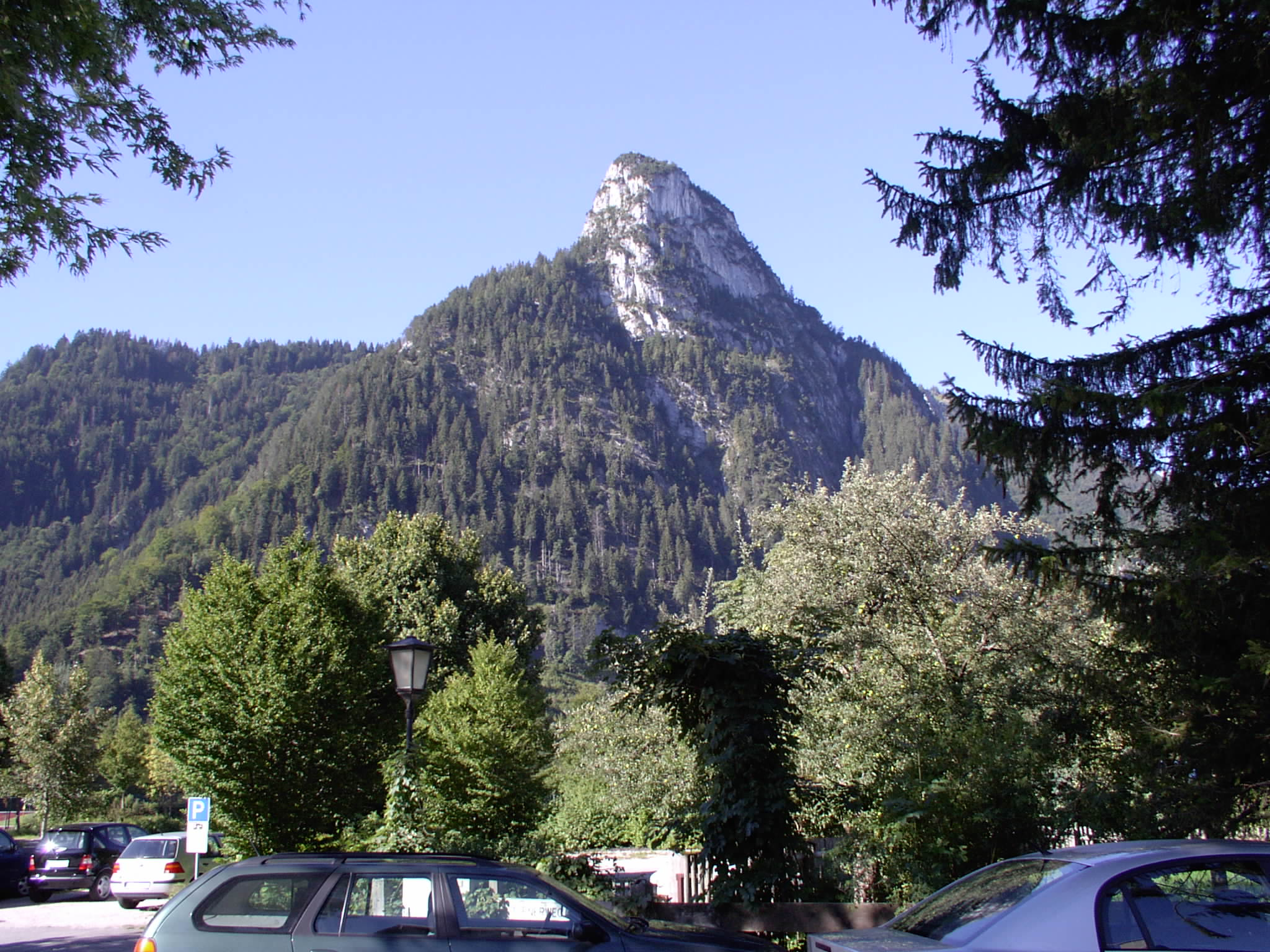
The Kofel, Oberammergau's signature mountain

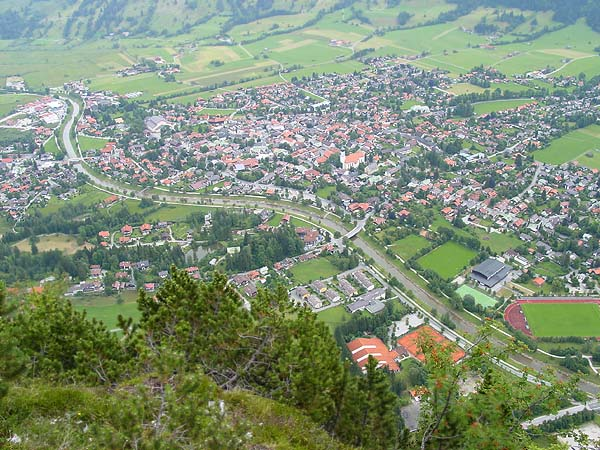
Oberammergau from the summit of the Kofel

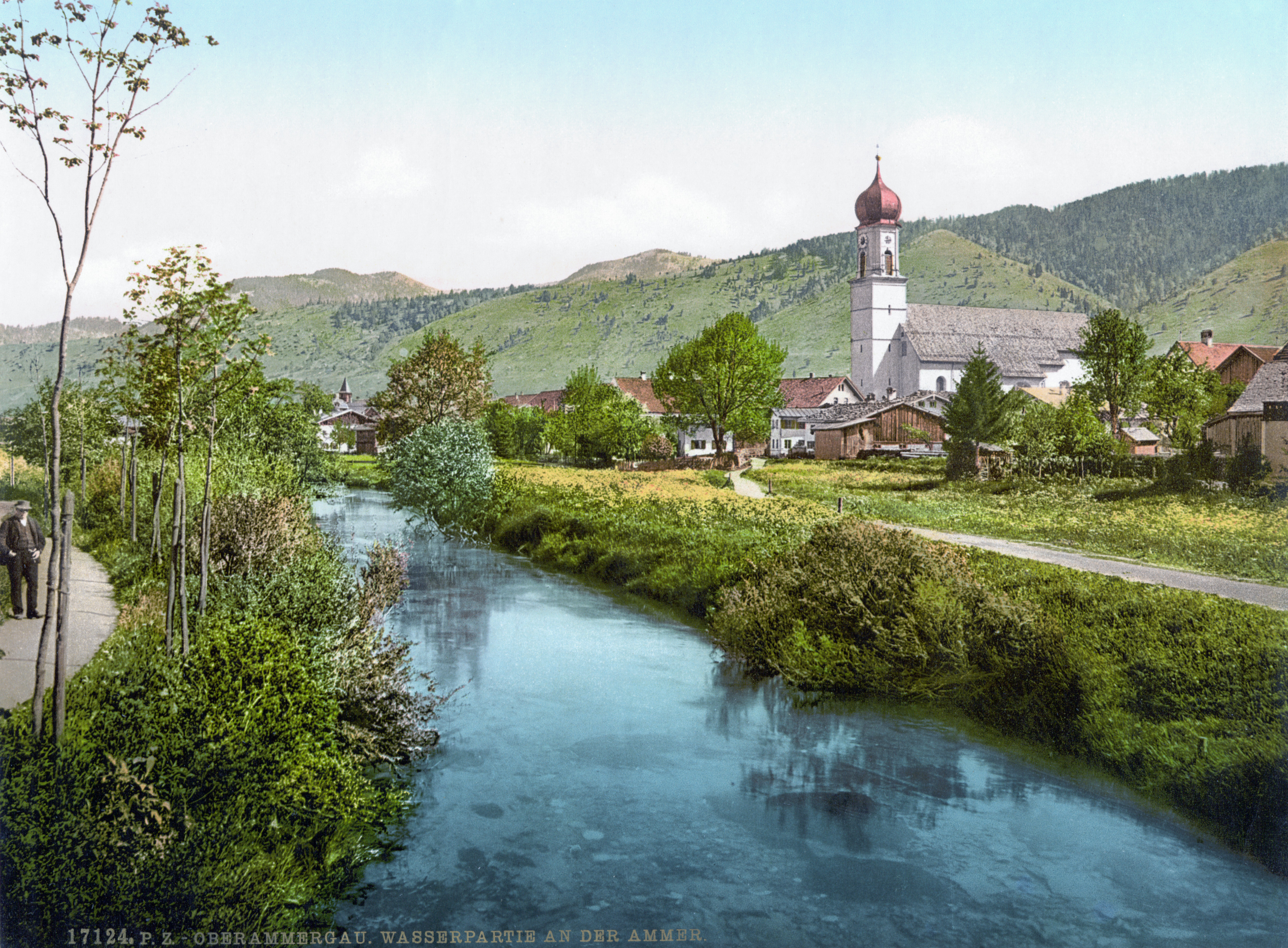
The town and the river Ammer in 1900

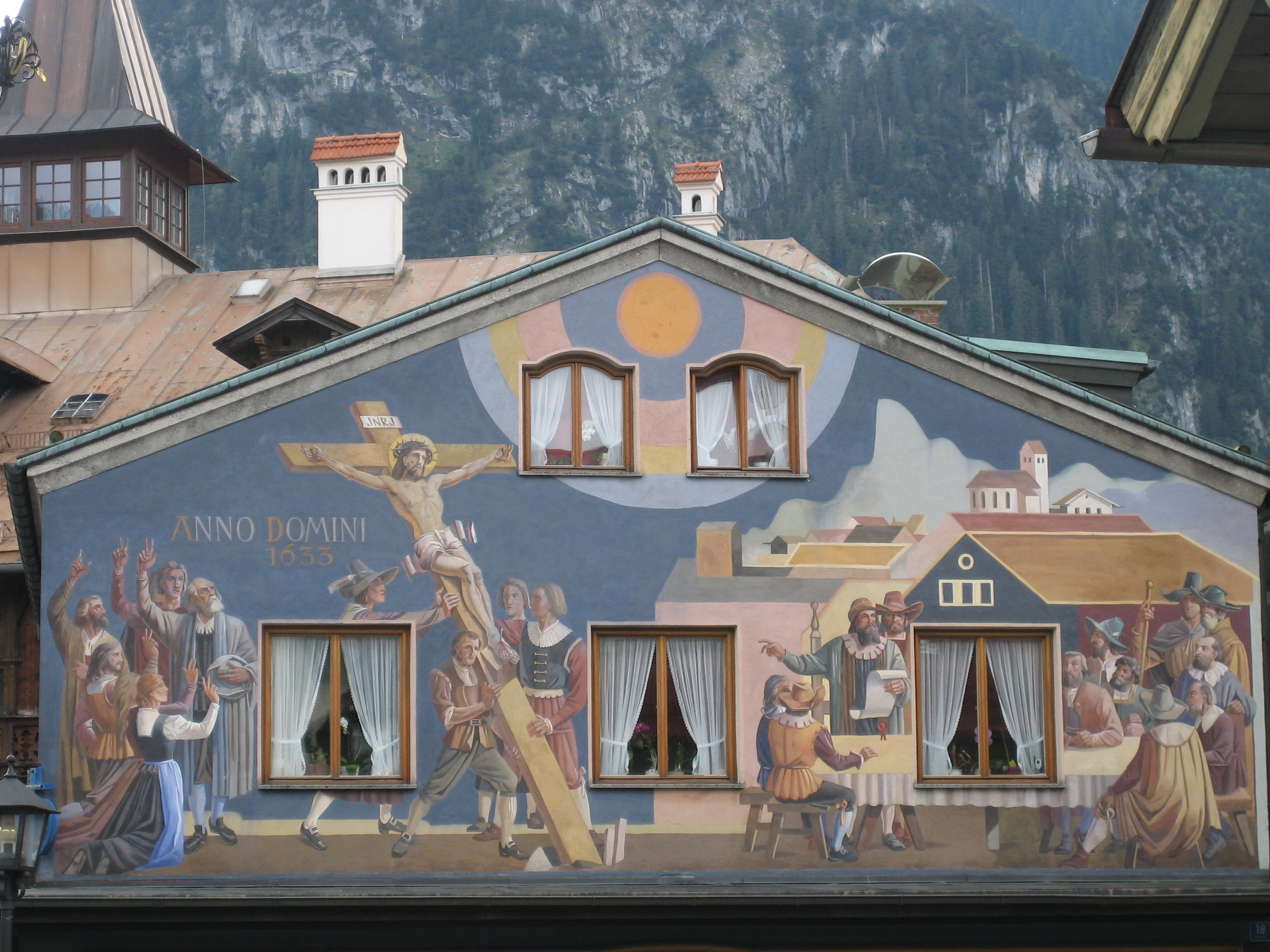
Representation of the Passion of Christ on a house in Oberammergau

== Notable people ==
- Rochus Dedler (1779–1822), composer
- Johannes Kirchmayer (1860–1930) immigrated to the US in 1880, leading woodcarvers in Boston USA
- Maximilian Dasio (1865–1954) painter and medal engraver, died in the town.
- Ludwig Thoma (1867–1921) author, publisher and editor
- Alois Lang (1872–1954) immigrated to the US in 1890, a master woodcarver at the American Seating Company
- Eugen Papst (1886–1956), composer
- Franz-Zeno Diemer (1889–1954) flight pioneer in Bavaria,
- Max Streibl (1932–1998) CSU politician, eighth Minister President of Bavaria
- Erich Ott (born 1944) sculptor, engraver and designer
- Gregor Betz (born 1948) former swimmer, competed at the 1968 and 1972 Summer Olympics born in the town
