= Bundesautobahn 95 =

Federal motorway in Germany

Coordinates: 47°44′31.48″N 11°19′54.70″E

A 95
- Bundesautobahn 95
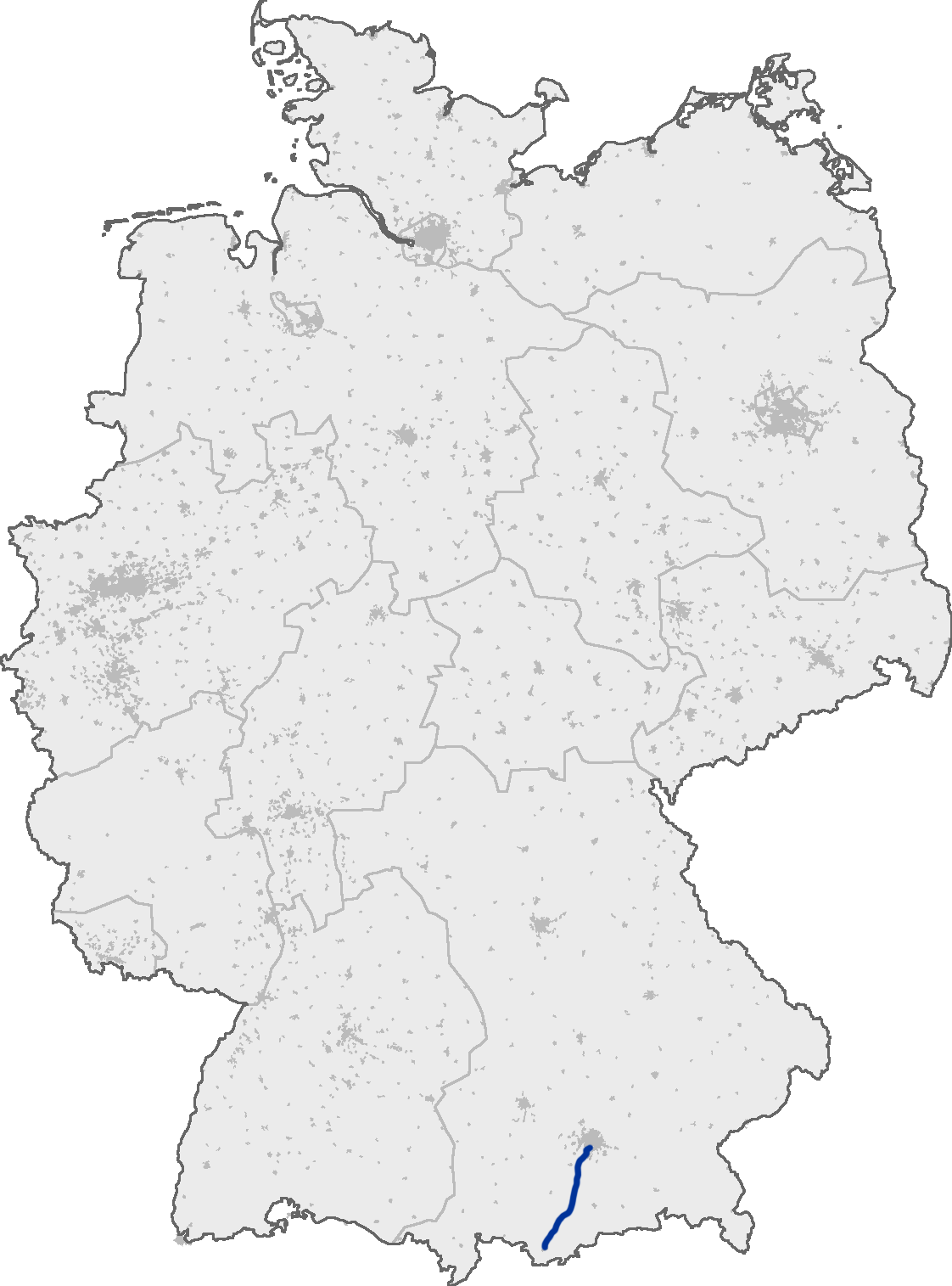

Route information
- Length: 67.368 km (41.861 mi)
- Existed: 1966–present

Major junctions
- North end: Sendling-Westpark, Munich
- South end: Eschenlohe, Bavaria

Location
- Country: Germany
- States: Bavaria

Highway system
- Roads in Germany; Autobahns; List; Federal; List; State; E-roads
← A 94	→ A 96

Bundesautobahn 95 (translates from German as Federal Motorway 95, short form Autobahn 95, abbreviated as BAB 95 or A 95) is a motorway in southern Germany, supposed to connect Munich with Garmisch-Partenkirchen.

== Route ==
=== General ===
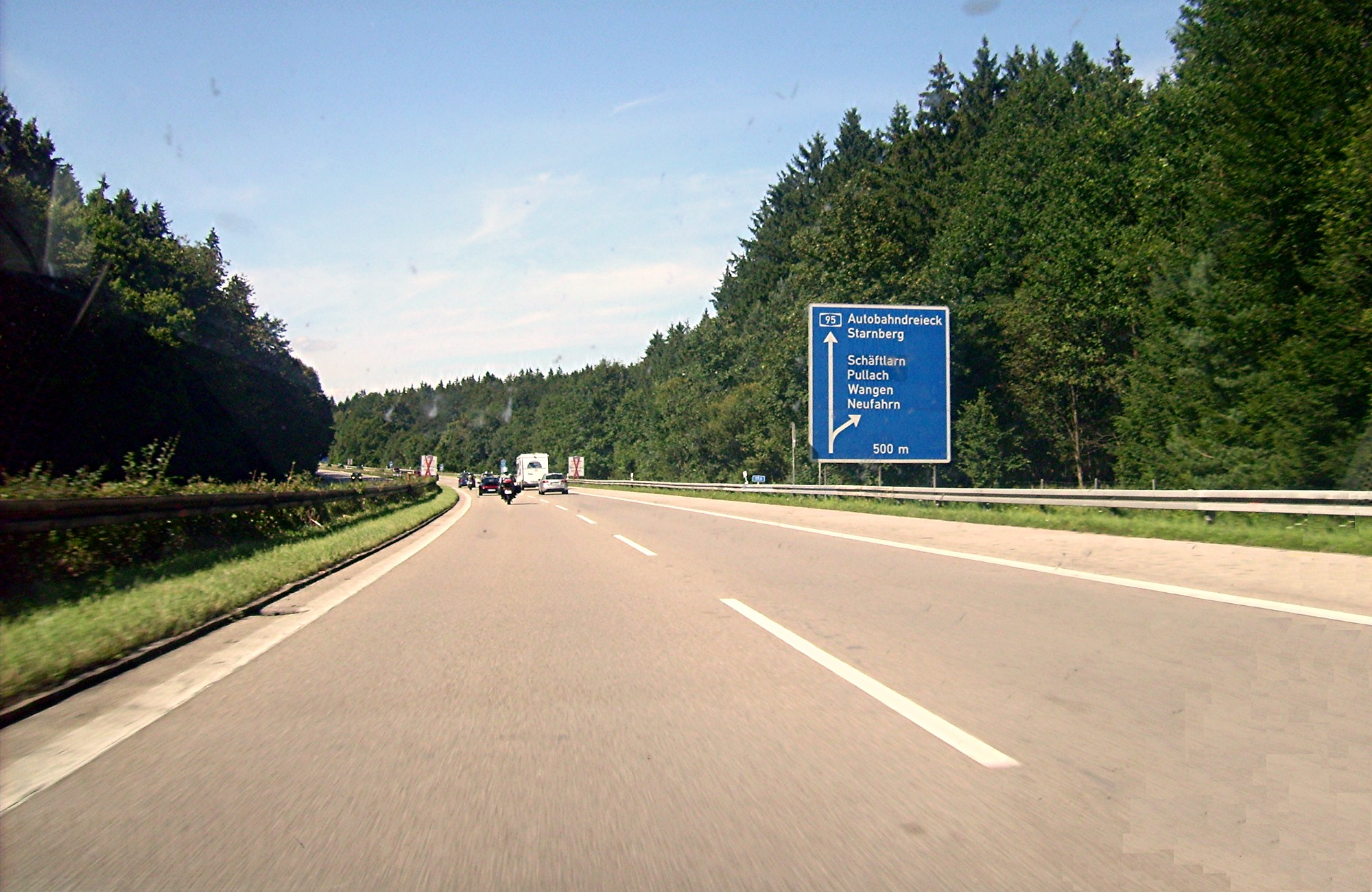
A 95 near Starnberg towards Munich

The A 95 is part of the European route E533 for its entire length. The northern part, to the Starnberg 3-way interchange is adapted to the needs of a large city (in this case, the road has been expanded to six lanes). Thereafter, the route runs with less traffic past the east side of the Lake Starnberg along the Alpine foothills.

=== Description of the route ===
Contrary to popular opinion, the Bundesautobahn 95 doesn't begin at München-Sendling-Süd (1), but in 1,7 kilometers (ca. one mile) southwest at München-Kreuzhof (2). The area in between, however, is a German Highway Code (Straßenverkehrs-Ordnung) motorway, and therefore, it has the sign 330. The section is dedicated as the German Federal Highway Act (Bundesfernstraßengesetz) Bundesstraße 2. There are no truck tolls on this section.

The first kilometers, the A 95 is six lanes near the Munich metropolitan area, the motorway threading through the Forstenried Park (Forstenrieder Park). At the end of this stretch is the 3-way interchange Starnberg (Bundesautobahn 952 to Starnberg). From here the A 95 has four lanes. The A 95 cross the districts Starnberg, Bad Tölz-Wolfratshausen and Weilheim-Schongau until the motorway reaches the district of Garmisch-Partenkirchen. The Bundesautobahn 95 ends at a temporary junction in the south of Eschenlohe and continues past that point as the B 2. There is a connection to Garmisch-Partenkirchen and on to Mittenwald, Innsbruck, or Fern Pass.

=== Speed limit ===
There is no speed limit over large parts of the A 95. Only in the Munich metropolitan area is a speed limit set at 80 km/h (ca 50 mph). In the area of the Starnberg 3-way interchange a 120 km/h (ca 75 mph) limit was imposed until November 2007, ending a four-year trial period.

== Relevance within the network of trunk roads ==
The A 95 is the only motorway that for the foreseeable future will not be connected to the German motorway network and therefore the A 95 has a more regional relevance. It connects the holiday region in the south of Munich with the state capital, and this section of roadway was placed in the Maxim magazine's Top Ten Roadways in the World for driving. The northern section between Munich and Starnberg is extensively used during the rush hour.

== History ==
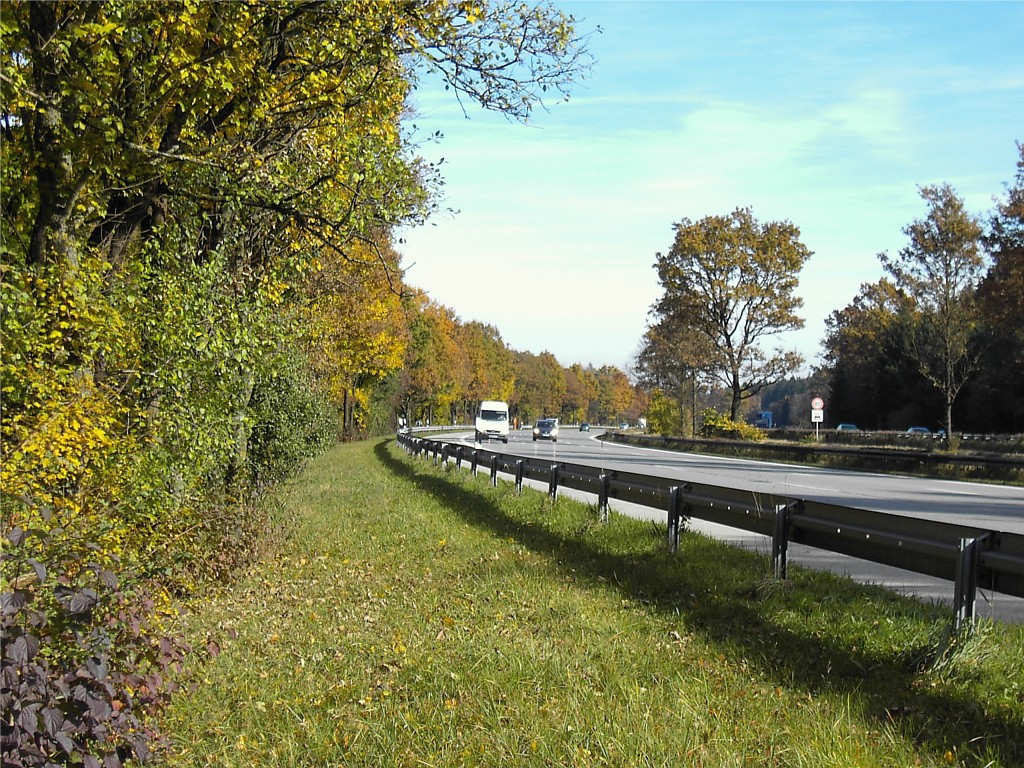
A 95 at “Forstenrieder Park”

Before World War II, a motorway was planned from Munich to Lindau. This motorway (Strecke 77) should be pass the Ammersee in the south. After World War II the plans were modified. Now the route was planned on the German side from Basel to Salzburg (Bundesautobahn 98) with a branch connecting Munich. The planning for the A 98 was stopped in 1980, due to the enormous cost, insufficient demand and lack of demonstrable acceptance. In Penzberg still recalls a partly built intersection of these plans.

To connect the Munich city entrance in the north of the planned intersection with the Bundesautobahn 99 the Bundesautobahn 996 was also planned.

The construction of the A 95 was begun in the 1960s in Munich. The opening of the first section from Munich to Schäftlarn in 1966. The next stretch opening in 1969 (to Wolfratshausen), 1970 (to Penzberg) and 1972 (till Ohlstadt). At this time the A 95 ended at a temporary junction in south of the Loisach bridge Ohlstadt. This bridge is the longest bridge in Bavaria (1315 Meter).

In summer 1972, the A 95 was temporarily closed between Munich and the 3-way interchange Starnberg, due to the Road bicycle racing during the Summer Olympics in Munich.

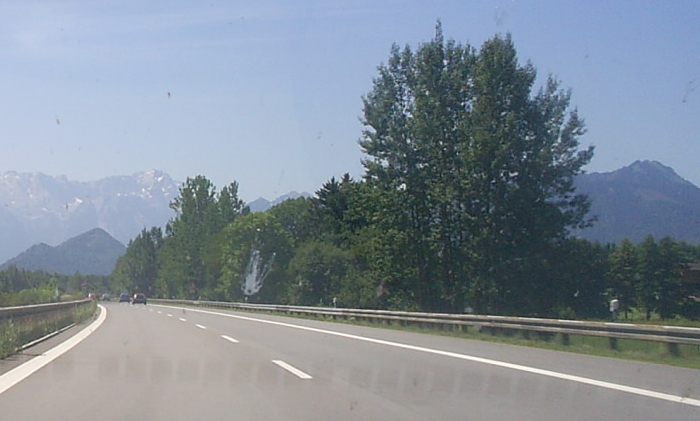
A 95 towards Garmisch-Partenkirchen with the Alps in background

The last expansion took place in 1982 to the temporary junction in the south of Eschenlohe. The further construction to Garmisch-Partenkirchen was planned for 1960, however since May 2000 there is only an approximately four Kilometer (ca 2.5 Miles) long bypass of Farchant, though it is signed as B 2. The plan is to continue to bypass Oberau with a West-tunnel, the Auerberg tunnel and a connection to the B 23n towards Reutte and Schongau.

Continuation of planned
Ausfahrt	Temporary junction
	Tunnel Auerberg (2000 m)
Ausfahrt	Oberau-North
	Tunnel Oberau (2995 m)
Ausfahrt	Oberau-South B 23
Ausfahrt	Farchant

Already built as B 2 section
Ausfahrt	Farchant
	Tunnel (90 m)
Brücke	Loisach bridge (120 m)
	Tunnel Farchant (2326 m)
Ausfahrt	Garmisch-Partenkirchen
Kreisverkehr	City entrance Garmisch-Partenkirchen

== Rest areas ==
Between the Schäftlarn and Wolfratshausen junctions is a rest area with a consistently managed service station on both sides of the motorway. In addition there are four parking spaces on both sides of the A 95 along the whole route.
