= Burgrain train derailment =

June 2022 disaster in Germany

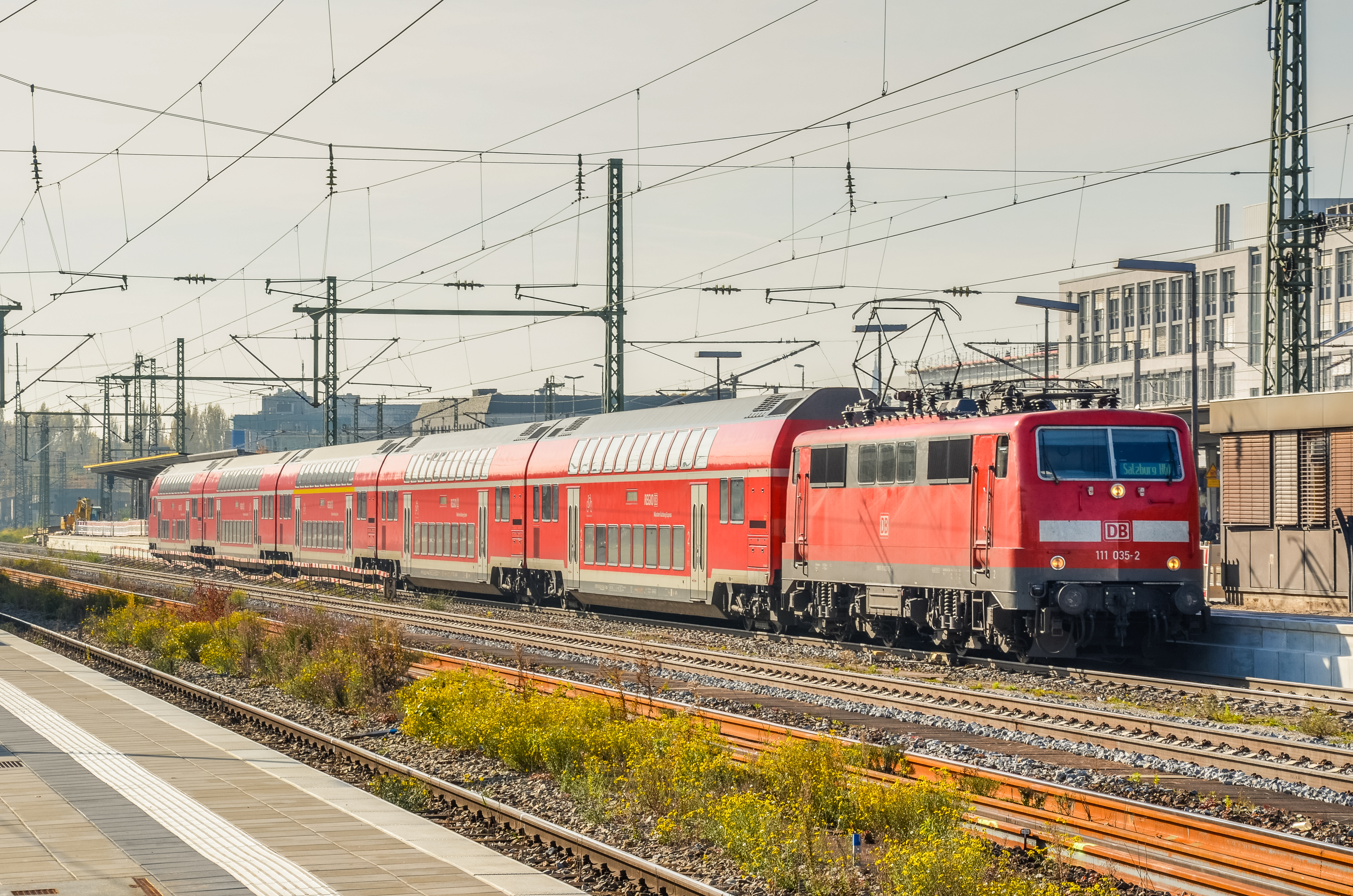
- The DB Class 111 035-2 locomotive involved, also with five Bombardier double-deck carriages, photographed in 2011

Details
- Date: 3 June 2022; 12:15 CEST (11:15 UTC)
- Location: Burgrain, Garmisch-Partenkirchen, southern Germany; 97.5 km (60.6 mi) south from Munich
- Coordinates: 47.51445°N 11.10757°E
- Country: Germany
- Line: Munich–Garmisch-Partenkirchen railway (KBS 960)
- Service: RB 6
- Incident type: Derailment

Statistics
- Trains: 1
- Deaths: 5
- Injured: 68

On 3 June 2022, a double decker regional train derailed north of Garmisch-Partenkirchen, near Burgrain on the Munich–Garmisch-Partenkirchen railway in southern Germany. Five people died and 68 passengers were injured, 16 of them seriously.

== Derailment ==
Five passenger carriages derailed at a curve near Loisachauen in the Burgrain district of Garmisch-Partenkirchen, heading north between Garmisch-Partenkirchen station and Farchant station. The electric locomotive was at the rear of the push–pull train configuration. The middle three carriages slid down an embankment next to the highway junction of Bundesstraße 23 and Bundesstraße 2 on the approach to the Farchant Tunnel. The derailment occurred at milestone position 97.5 kilometres (60.6 mi), as measured from Munich.

Three overhead line supports were knocked over in the accident, while 500 sleepers and 700 m of track were so badly damaged that they had to be replaced. Three of the double-deck coaches had to be written off.

Soldiers travelling on board the train were able to provide first aid. The location of the derailment right next to a main road allowed emergency vehicles to be brought in quickly. Six rescue helicopters attended. Lightly injured people were taken to a local building for care. Train services were suspended between Oberau station and Garmisch-Partenkirchen station.

Five people were killed. Two of them were refugees from Ukraine. The accident took place on the last Friday before the Pentecost holiday, meaning there were many children on the train.

== Victims ==
Five people died in the crash: a 13-year-old boy from the Garmisch-Partenkirchen district, a 51-year-old woman from Wiesbaden, a 70-year-old woman from the Munich district and two Ukrainian women, aged 30 and 39, who had fled the Russian invasion of their homeland.

In the first nine days after the crash, there were reportedly 44 injured, of whom 15 were seriously injured; the police later updated this. As of 12 June, 16 people were reportedly seriously injured, while 52 had suffered less grievous injuries.

== Investigation ==
The Federal Authority for Railway Accident Investigation (Bundesstelle für Eisenbahnunfalluntersuchung, or BEU) began an investigation into the course of events later on the same day as the accident. The Weilheim police service established a special commission with some 50 members, working under the "Munich II" Public Prosecution Service, to review any application of criminal law to the accident. The commission was named "Soko Zug", the former word being a contraction of "Sonderkommission" ("special commission") and the latter the German word for "train". Further, the Prosecution Service assigned an independent external consultant to prepare an expert report analyzing the accident. The train was seized for examination; early on, the bogies underwent close inspection. A length of a few hundred metres of rail southwards from the derailment site was dismantled for the investigation and likewise secured. The bogies and wrecked coaches stored nearby have since been under police guard, as were the locomotive and the last coaches still left on the track before they were taken away. The investigation quickly came to focus on the rails and the bogies, with concentration on technical defects. Even the earliest investigation, according to police information, showed that the permitted speed limit at the accident site had been observed.

No faults, such as a broken wheel, were found in the train's running gear. It seemed, not that the wheels had jumped the rails, but rather that in a few spots, the rails had come loose from their fastenings and tipped over onto the sleepers. Bayerischer Rundfunk reported on 30 June 2022 that a circular from the Bundestag's transport board mentioned that horizontal cracks in damaged sleepers may have been a contributing cause to the accident, leaving the rails with too little hold on the sleepers, leading to an effective broadening of the track gauge, and the consequent derailment. Also, a locomotive drivers' chatroom conversation that came to Report Mainz's attention referred to the defective state of the railway line, especially from Tutzing on south. Poor workmanship at a sleeper manufacturer was assumed to be at play. A private analysis in July 2022 put forth the suggestion that the embankment over which the railway ran might have been undercut by the stream that runs by just there, leaving the earthworks unstable, which in turn led to the derailment. This brook had been diverted in the 1990s during the widening of Bundesstraßen B2 and B23, putting it nearer the railway embankment. A professional opinion expressed by the Munich II prosecutor's office beginning in early 2023 holds that the embankment became waterlogged, and that this could be the derailment's cause. An interim report from the BEU on 1 June 2023 names a defect in the railway line's permanent way as the primary accident cause: "The prestressed concrete sleepers laid at this place displayed damage, which leads to the conclusion that there was a loss of prestressing within the sleeper. This consequently led to a structural failure and the breaking away of the rail-fastening chairs in the direction of the introduced forces."

On 7 June, the "Munich II" Public Prosecution Service announced that it had begun preliminary proceedings against three Deutsche Bahn employees on the grounds of reasonable suspicion of negligent homicide. The three employees in question were the traffic controller who was on duty that day at the Weilheim control centre, the locomotive driver and the one responsible for the permanent way along the stretch of line where the accident happened.

== See also ==
- Garmisch-Partenkirchen train collision, a different rail accident, in 1995.
