= Ohlstadt station =

Railway station in Bavaria

Ohlstadt
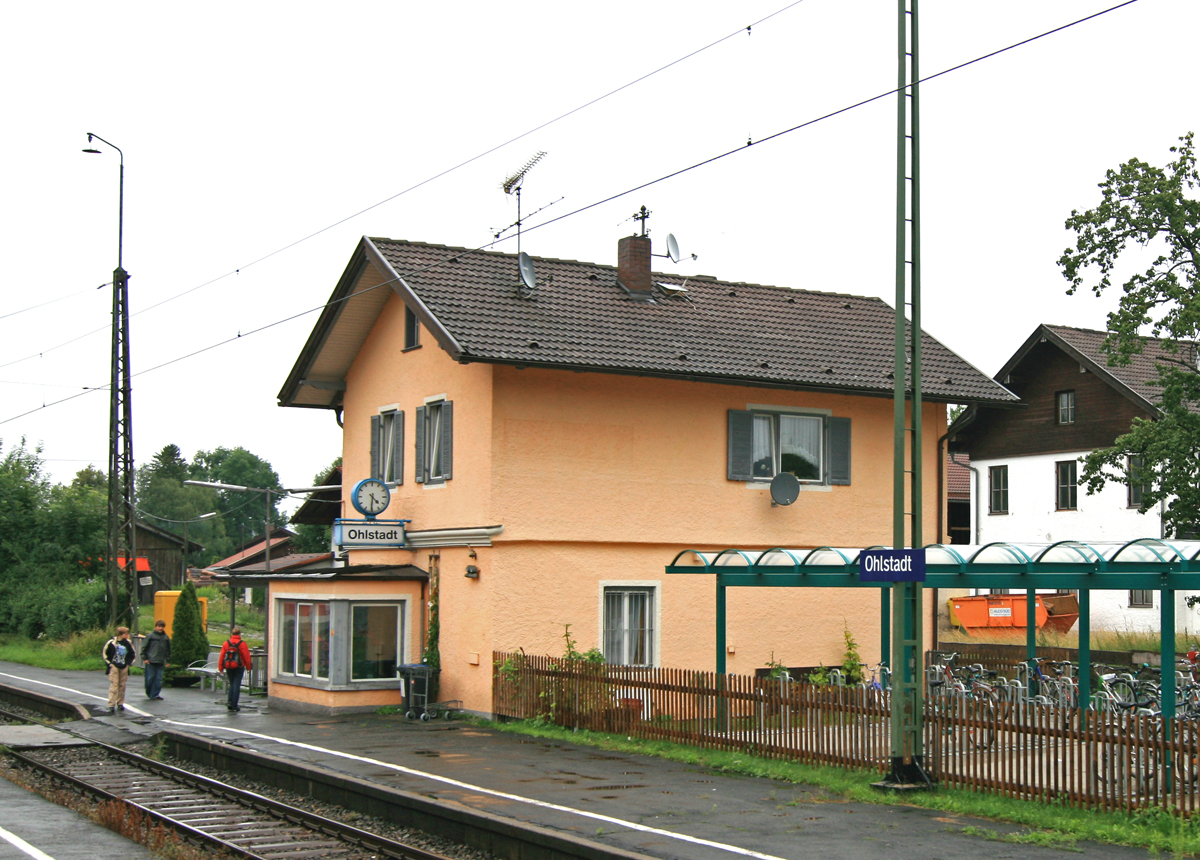
- The station in 2008

General information
- Location: Ohlstadt, Bavaria; Germany
- Coordinates: 47°38′03″N 11°13′05″E
- Owner: DB Netz
- Operator: DB Station&Service
- Lines: Munich–Garmisch-Partenkirchen line (KBS 960)
- Distance: 81.1 km (50.4 mi) from München Hauptbahnhof
- Platforms: 2 side platforms
- Tracks: 2
- Train operators: DB Regio Bayern
- Connections: Regionalverkehr Oberbayern buses

Other information
- Station code: 4752
- DS100 code: MOH
- IBNR: 8004662
- Category: 6

Services
Preceding station	DB Regio Bayern	Following station
Eschenlohe towards Innsbruck Hbf	RB 6	Murnau towards München Hbf
Eschenlohe towards Pfronten-Steinach	RB 60	Murnau towards München Hbf
Location

Ohlstadt station (German: Bahnhof Ohlstadt) is a railway station in the municipality of Ohlstadt, in Bavaria, Germany. It is located on the Munich–Garmisch-Partenkirchen railway of Deutsche Bahn.

== Services ==
As of the December 2021 timetable change, the following services stop at Ohlstadt:

- RB: hourly service between München Hauptbahnhof and Garmisch-Partenkirchen; some trains continue from Garmisch-Partenkirchen to Pfronten-Steinach, Mittenwald, Seefeld in Tirol, or Innsbruck.
