= Garmisch-Partenkirchen Hausberg station =

Train station in Garmisch-Partenkirchen, Germany

Garmisch-Partenkirchen Hausberg
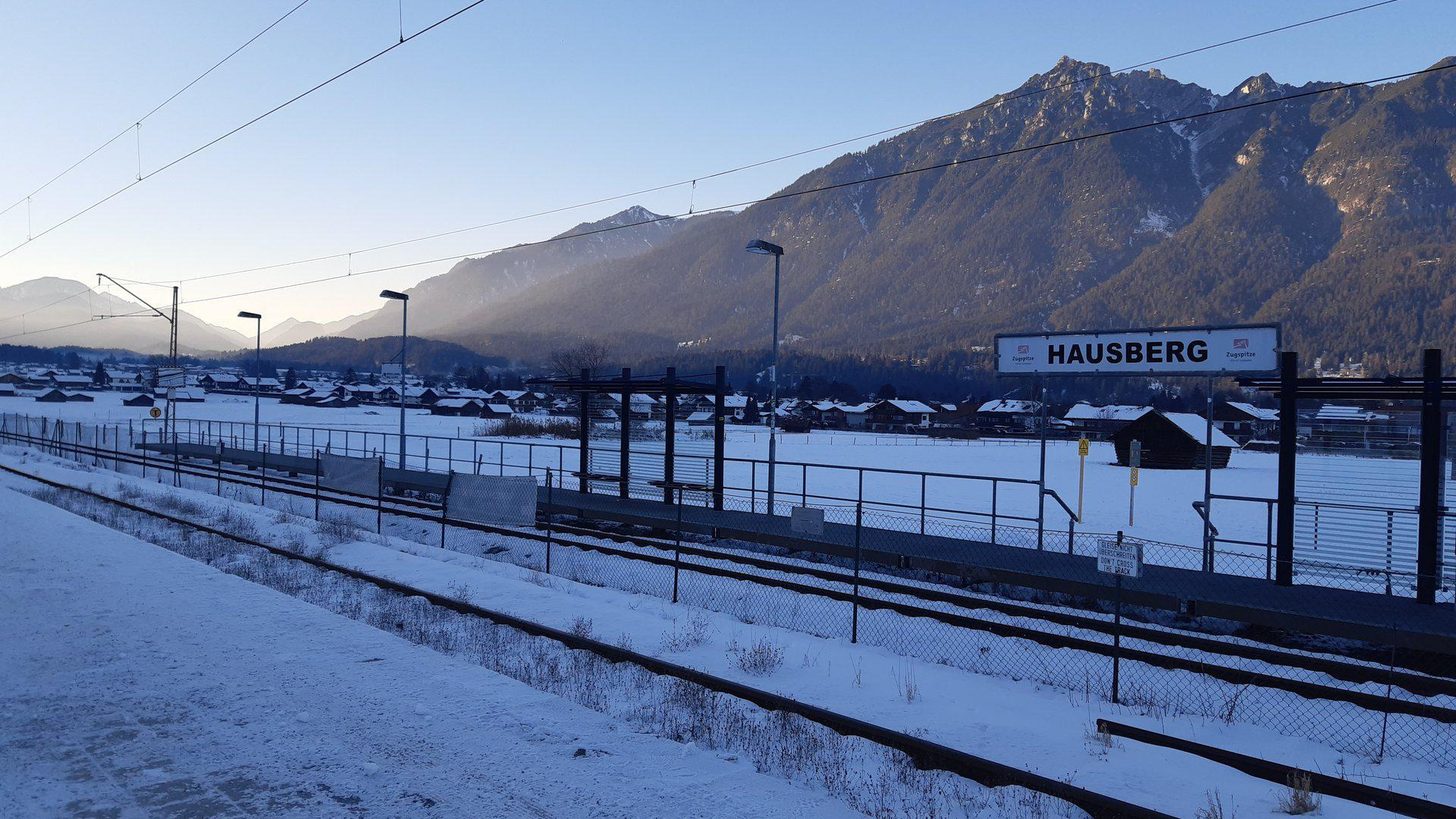
- Garmisch-Partenkirechen Hausberg Station

General information
- Location: Hausberg; 82467 Garmisch-Partenkirchen; Bavaria; Germany
- Coordinates: 47.4833°N 11.0921°E
- System: Hp
- Lines: Ausserfern Railway (KBS 965); Bavarian Zugspitze Railway (KBS 11031)
- Platforms: 2 side platforms
- Tracks: 2
- Train operators: DB Regio Bayern

Construction
- Parking: yes
- Cycle facilities: yes
- Accessible: yes

Other information
- Station code: -
- DS100 code: MGHB / MGPH
- IBNR: 8002188
- Category: -

Services
Preceding station	Bayerische Zugspitzbahn	Following station
Kreuzeck/Alpspitzbahn towards Grainau	RB 64	Garmisch-Partenkirchen Zugspitzbahn towards Garmisch-Partenkirchen
Preceding station	DB Regio Bayern	Following station
Untergrainau towards Lermoos	RE 62 Limited service	Garmisch-Partenkirchen One-way operation
Untergrainau towards Pfronten-Steinach	RB 60	Garmisch-Partenkirchen towards München Hbf
Location
- Location within Bavaria Location within Germany Location within Europe

Garmisch-Partenkirchen Hausberg station (German: Haltepunkt Garmisch-Partenkirchen) is a railway station in the municipality of Garmisch-Partenkirchen, located in the Garmisch-Partenkirchen district in Bavaria, Germany. It is operated by Bavarian Zugspitze Railway.

== Notable places nearby ==
- Hausberg
