= Eschenlohe station =

Railway station in Germany

Eschenlohe
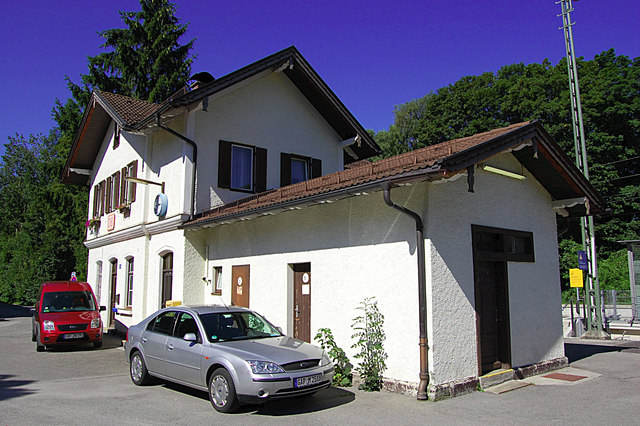
- the station building in 2011

General information
- Location: Bahnhofstraße 15; Eschenlohe, Bavaria; Germany
- Coordinates: 47°36′N 11°11′E
- Elevation: 636 m (2,087 ft)
- System: Bf
- Owner: DB Netz
- Operator: DB Station&Service
- Lines: Munich–Garmisch-Partenkirchen railway (KBS 960)
- Distance: 85.4 km (53.1 mi) from München Hauptbahnhof
- Platforms: 2 side platforms
- Tracks: 2
- Train operators: DB Regio Bayern

Other information
- Station code: 1677
- DS100 code: MECH
- IBNR: 8001880
- Category: 6
- Website: www.bahnhof.de

Services
Preceding station	DB Regio Bayern	Following station
Oberau towards Innsbruck Hbf	RB 6	Ohlstadt towards München Hbf
Oberau towards Pfronten-Steinach	RB 60	Ohlstadt towards München Hbf
Location

Eschenlohe station is a railway station in the municipality of Eschenlohe, in the Garmisch-Partenkirchen district in Bavaria, Germany. It is located on the Munich–Garmisch-Partenkirchen railway of Deutsche Bahn.

== Services ==
As of the December 2021 timetable change, the following services stop at Eschenlohe:

- RB: hourly service between München Hauptbahnhof and Garmisch-Partenkirchen; some trains continue from Garmisch-Partenkirchen to Pfronten-Steinach, Mittenwald, Seefeld in Tirol, or Innsbruck.
