= Oberau station =

Railway station in Bavaria

Oberau
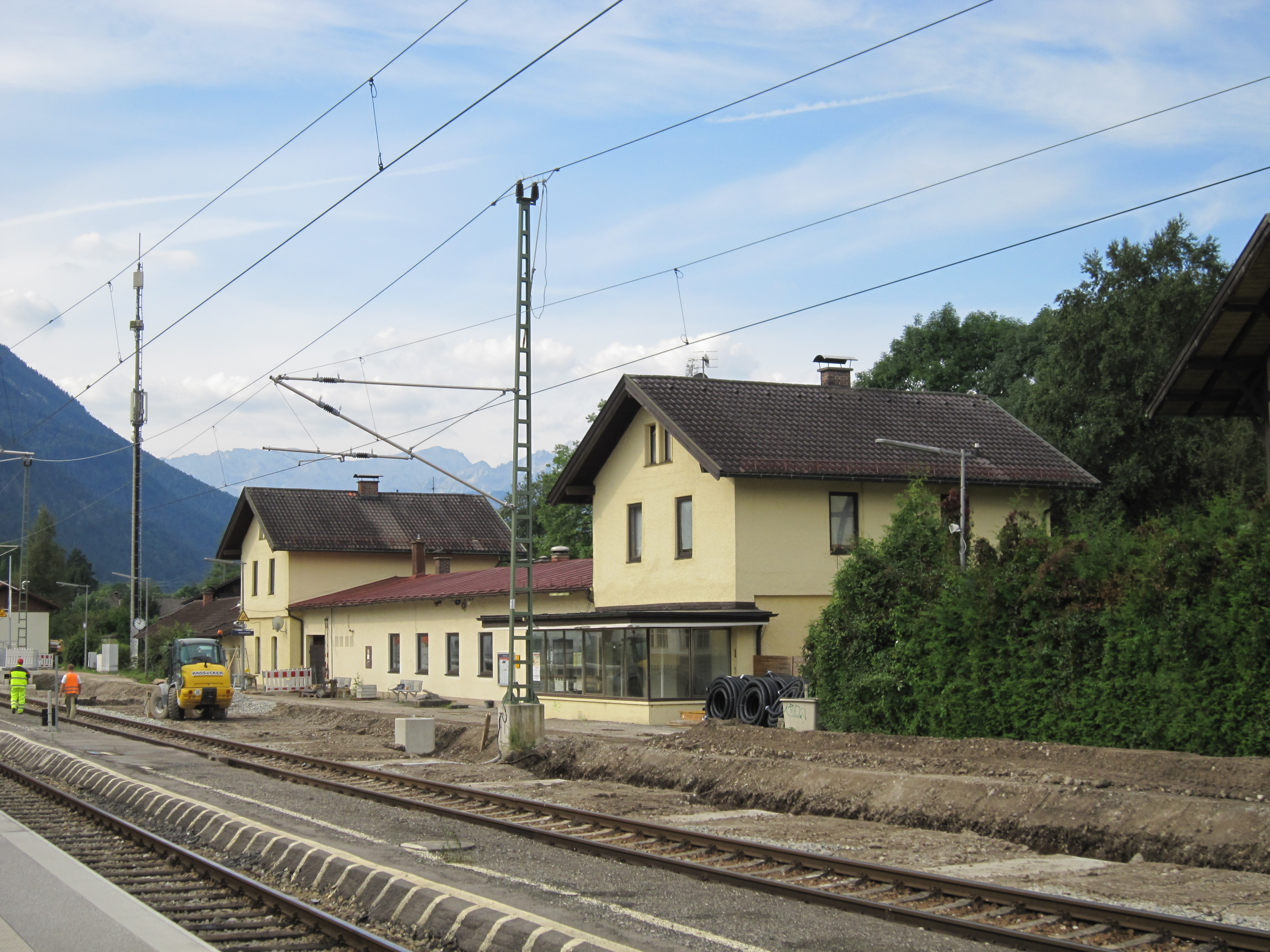
- Construction work underway in 2010

General information
- Location: Oberau, Bavaria; Germany
- Coordinates: 47°33′33″N 11°08′21″E
- Owner: DB Netz
- Operator: DB Station&Service
- Lines: Munich–Garmisch-Partenkirchen line (KBS 960)
- Distance: 91.9 km (57.1 mi) from München Hauptbahnhof
- Platforms: 2 side platforms
- Tracks: 2
- Train operators: DB Regio Bayern
- Connections: Regionalverkehr Oberbayern buses

Other information
- Station code: 4620
- DS100 code: MOU
- IBNR: 8004506
- Category: 6

Services
Preceding station	DB Regio Bayern	Following station
Farchant towards Innsbruck Hbf	RB 6	Eschenlohe towards München Hbf
Farchant towards Pfronten-Steinach	RB 60	Eschenlohe towards München Hbf
Location

Oberau station (German: Bahnhof Oberau) is a railway station in the municipality of Oberau, in Bavaria, Germany. It is located on the Munich–Garmisch-Partenkirchen railway of Deutsche Bahn.

== Services ==
As of the December 2021 timetable change, the following services stop at Oberau:

- RB: hourly service between München Hauptbahnhof and Garmisch-Partenkirchen; some trains continue from Garmisch-Partenkirchen to Pfronten-Steinach, Mittenwald, Seefeld in Tirol, or Innsbruck.
