= Großweil =

- Municipality
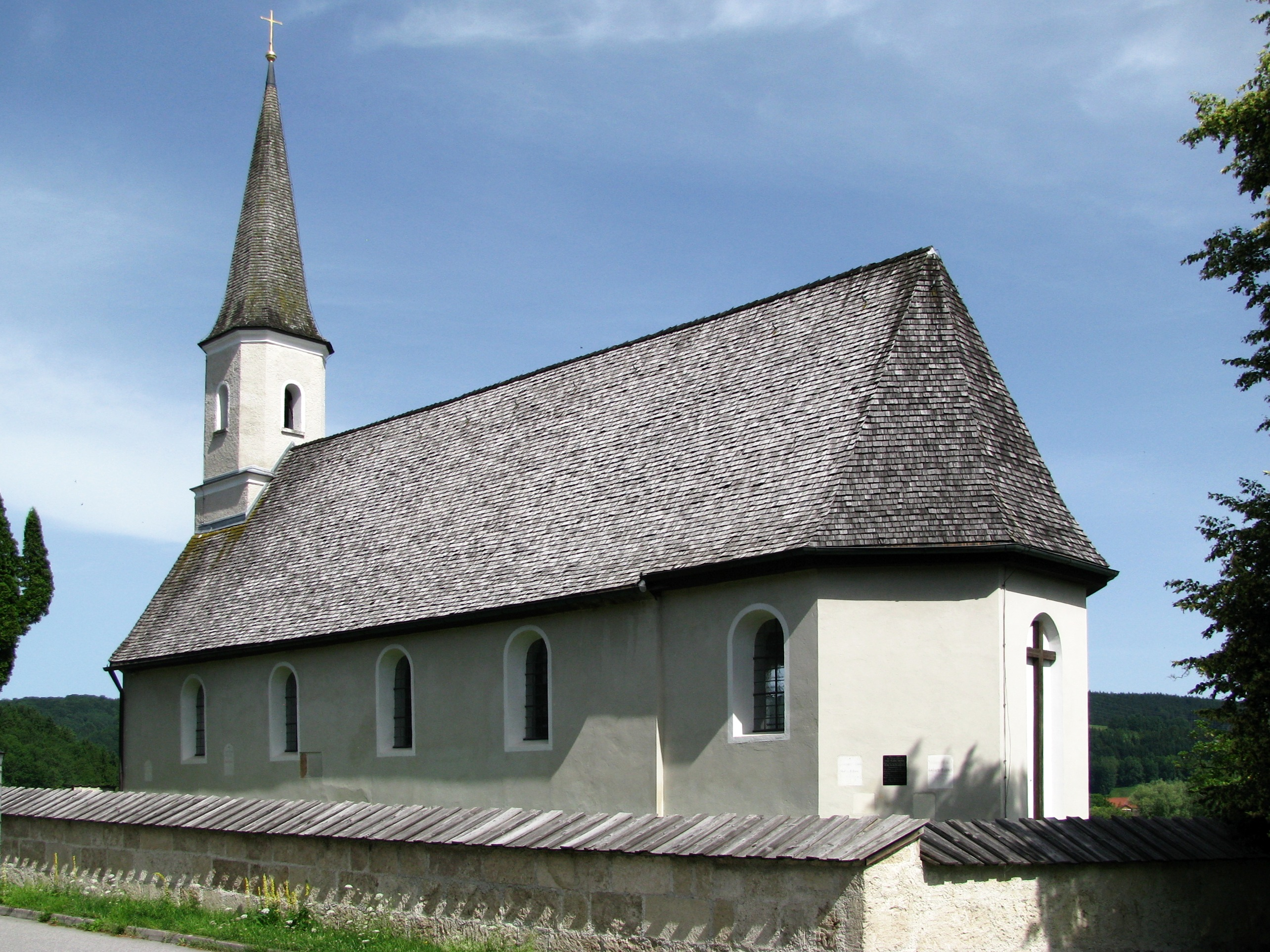
- Church of Saint George

- Coat of arms

- Location of Großweil within Garmisch-Partenkirchen district
- Interactive map of Großweil
- Location within Germany Location within Bavaria
- Coordinates: 47°41′N 11°18′E
- Country: Germany
- State: Bavaria
- Admin. region: Oberbayern
- District: Garmisch-Partenkirchen
- Municipal assoc.: Ohlstadt

Government
  - Mayor (2020–26): Frank Bauer (FW)

Area
  - Total: 22.04 km^{2} (8.51 sq mi)
- Elevation: 621 m (2,037 ft)

Population (2025-12-31)
  - Total: 1,618
  - Density: 73.41/km^{2} (190.1/sq mi)
- Time zone: UTC+01:00 (CET)
  - Summer (DST): UTC+02:00 (CEST)
- Postal codes: 82439
- Dialling codes: 08851
- Vehicle registration: GAP
- Website: www.grossweil.de

Großweil is a municipality in the district of Garmisch-Partenkirchen, in Bavaria, Germany.
