= Bundesautobahn 952 =

Federal motorway in Germany

A 952
- Bundesautobahn 952

Route information
- Length: 5 km (3.1 mi)

Location
- Country: Germany
- States: Bavaria

Highway system
- Roads in Germany; Autobahns; List; Federal; List; State; E-roads

Bundesautobahn 952 (translates from German as Federal Motorway 952, short form Autobahn 952, abbreviated as BAB 952 or A 952) is an autobahn near Munich in southern Germany, connecting Starnberg with the Autobahndreieck Starnberg exchange.

== Description ==
It connects the A61 near Bingen am Rhein with the A48 near Koblenz. The total length of the motorway is about 35 kilometres.

In Starnberg, it merges into Bundesstraße 2, which it replaces between Starnberg and the Dreieck Starnberg junction.

== Exit list ==
State	District	Location	km	mi	Exit	Name	Destinations	Notes
Bayern	Starnberg	Starnberg	0	0.0	1	Dreieck Starnberg	A 95 – Munich, Garmisch-Partenkirchen	northern endpoint of motorway
Bayern	Starnberg	Starnberg	4.5	2.8	2	Percha	Percha, Seeshaupt, Berg	Westbound exit and entrance and eastbound entrance
Bayern	Starnberg	Starnberg	4.8	3.0	2	Percha	Percha, Wangen, Berg, Wolfratshausen	Eastbound entrance and exit
Bayern	Starnberg	Starnberg	4.8	3.0	2	Percha	B 2 – Starnberg, Weilheim	Transition to B2 eastbound at km 4.8 and westbound at km 4.6
1.000 mi = 1.609 km; 1.000 km = 0.621 mi: Concurrency terminus; Incomplete access; Proposed; Route transition
