= Zugspitzplatt station =

Train station in Garmisch-Partenkirchen, Germany

Zugspitzplatt
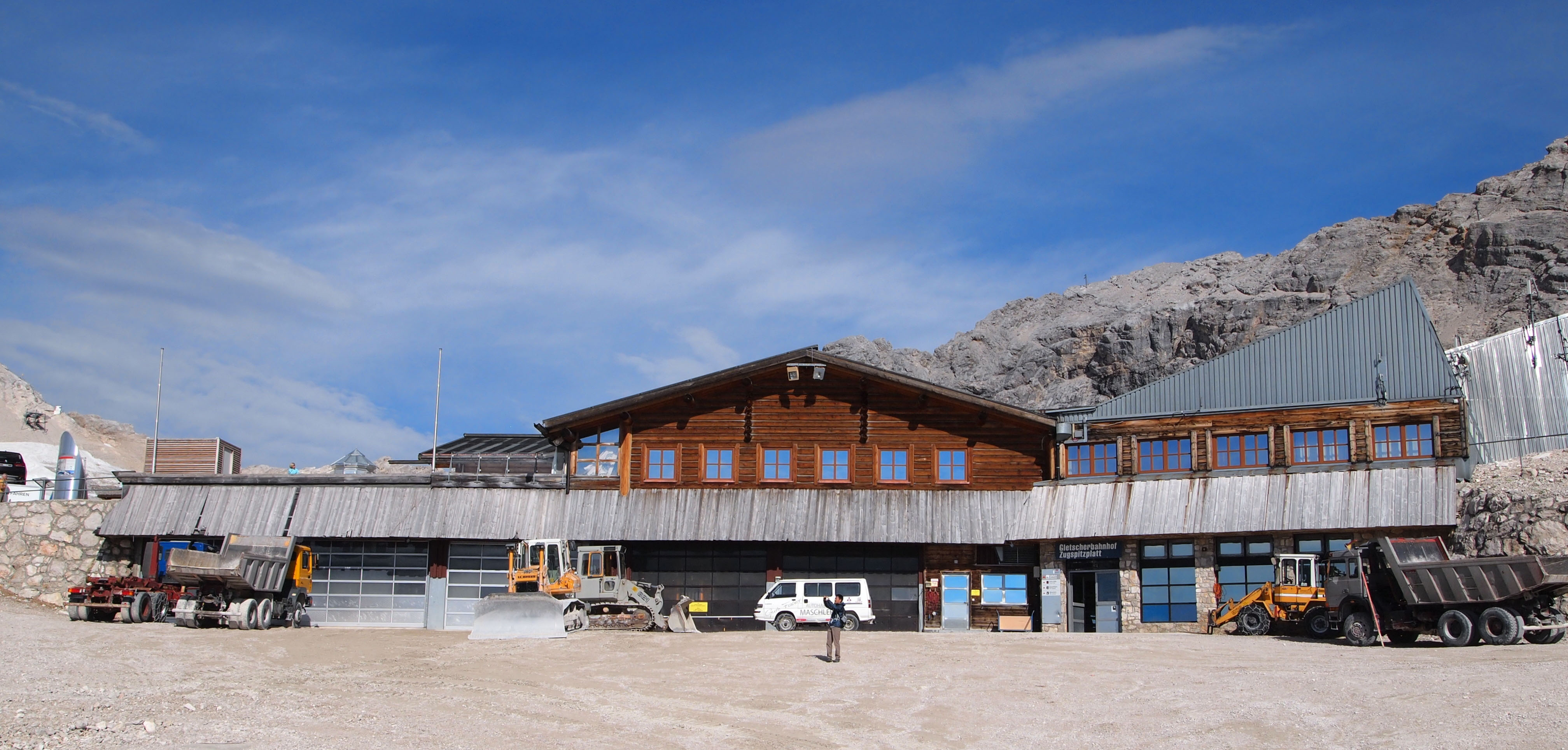
- 2014

General information
- Location: Zugspitze; 82475 Garmisch-Partenkirchen; Bavaria; Germany
- Coordinates: 47.41311°N 10.97951°E
- System: Hp
- Owner: Bayerische Zugspitzbahn
- Operator: Bayerische Zugspitzbahn
- Lines: Bavarian Zugspitze Railway (KBS 11031)
- Platforms: 1 side platform 1 island platform
- Tracks: 2
- Train operators: Bayerische Zugspitzbahn

Services
Preceding station	Bayerische Zugspitzbahn	Following station
Terminus	Rack railway	Riffelrieß towards Grainau
Location
- Location within Bavaria Location within Germany Location within Europe

Zugspitzplatt Station, also known as the Glacier Station Zugspitzplatt, is a high-altitude railway terminus of the Bayerische Zugspitzbahn, a cog railway that connects Garmisch-Partenkirchen to the Zugspitzplatt, a plateau on Zugspitze, Germany's highest mountain at 2,962 meters (9,718 ft). Situated at approximately 2,588 meters (8,491 ft) above sea level, the station serves as a critical interchange point for the Gletscherbahn cable car, which transports passengers to the summit in about five minutes. The station is a key hub for tourists visiting the Zugspitze, particularly during winter when the surrounding area becomes Germany's highest ski resort.

== History ==
The modern Zugspitzplatt Station was constructed in the mid-1980s to provide winter sports enthusiasts with direct access to the Zugspitzplatt plateau. Construction of the new station and the adjacent Rosi Tunnel began in the summer of 1985, driven by the need to improve accessibility to Germany's highest ski area. The project was completed in late 1987, and the station officially opened to the public on January 15, 1988. Replacing earlier infrastructure from the Bayerische Zugspitzbahn's initial operations in 1930, the new above-ground station was strategically positioned at the end of the Rosi Tunnel, connecting seamlessly to the Sonnalpin Glacier Restaurant and the Gletscherbahn cable car. Designed to accommodate large crowds, it features two stub tracks with a central platform and two side platforms, one of which includes a loading crane for freight cars. The station's distinctive barrel-shaped corrugated metal roof was covered with stones and rubble for aesthetic integration into the alpine landscape, reflecting both functional and environmental considerations.

== Services ==
The Zugspitzplatt Station is exclusively served by the Bayerische Zugspitzbahn, a narrow-gauge cog railway operated by Bayerische Zugspitzbahn Bergbahn AG. This line runs from Garmisch-Partenkirchen, starting at an elevation of 705 meters (2,313 ft), to the Zugspitzplatt at 2,588 meters (8,491 ft), covering a total distance of 19 kilometers (12 mi) with an elevation gain of 1,945 meters (6,381 ft). Trains depart from Garmisch-Partenkirchen approximately every hour, with a journey time of around 75 minutes. Passengers typically travel on a local train from Garmisch-Partenkirchen to Grainau, where they transfer to the cog railway for the ascent to Zugspitzplatt, with intermediate stops including Hausberg, Kreuzeck-/Alpspitzbahn, Hammersbach, and Eibsee along the route. Upon arrival at Zugspitzplatt Station, passengers can connect to the Gletscherbahn cable car for the final ascent to the Zugspitze summit.

== Gallery ==
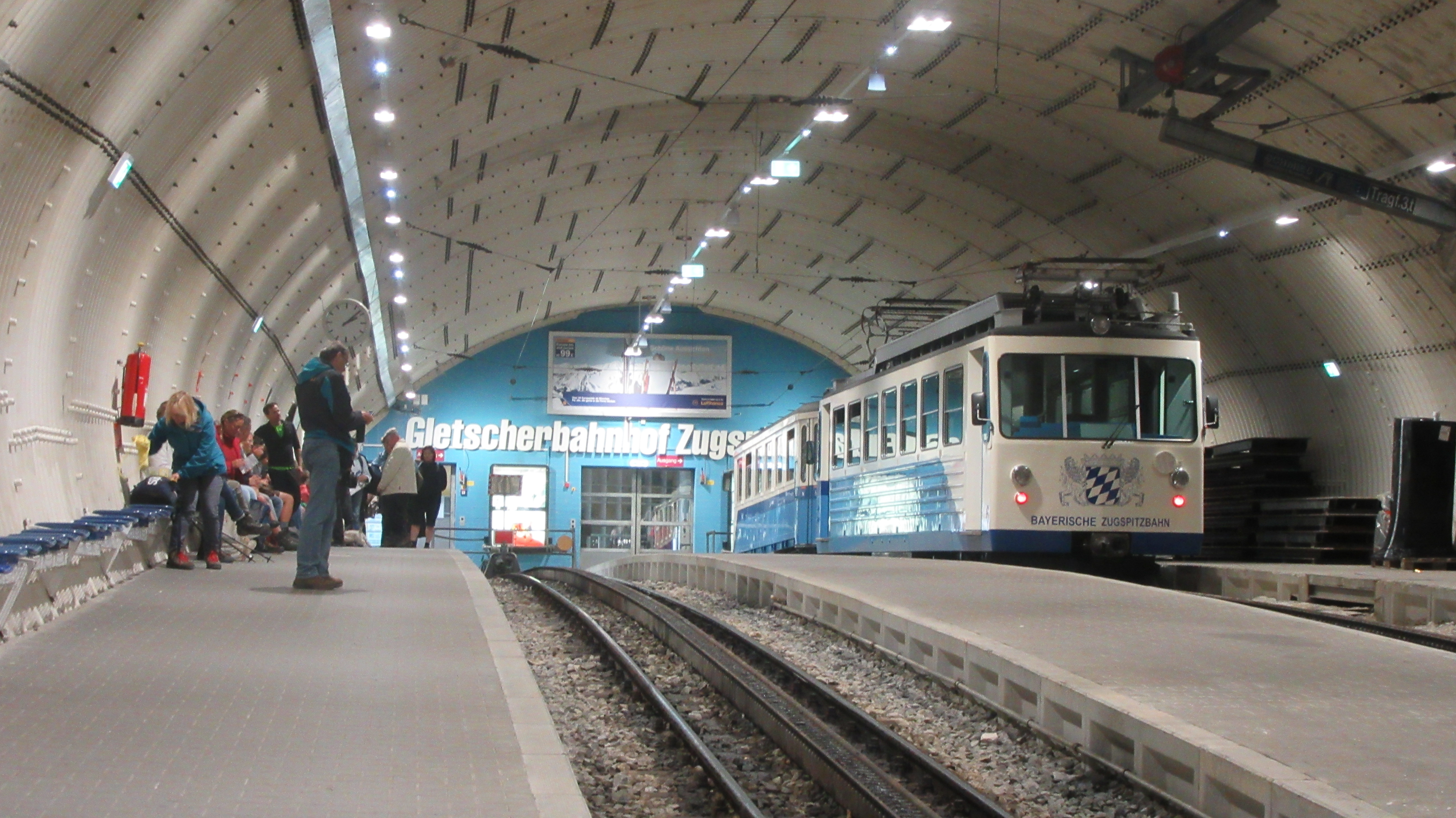

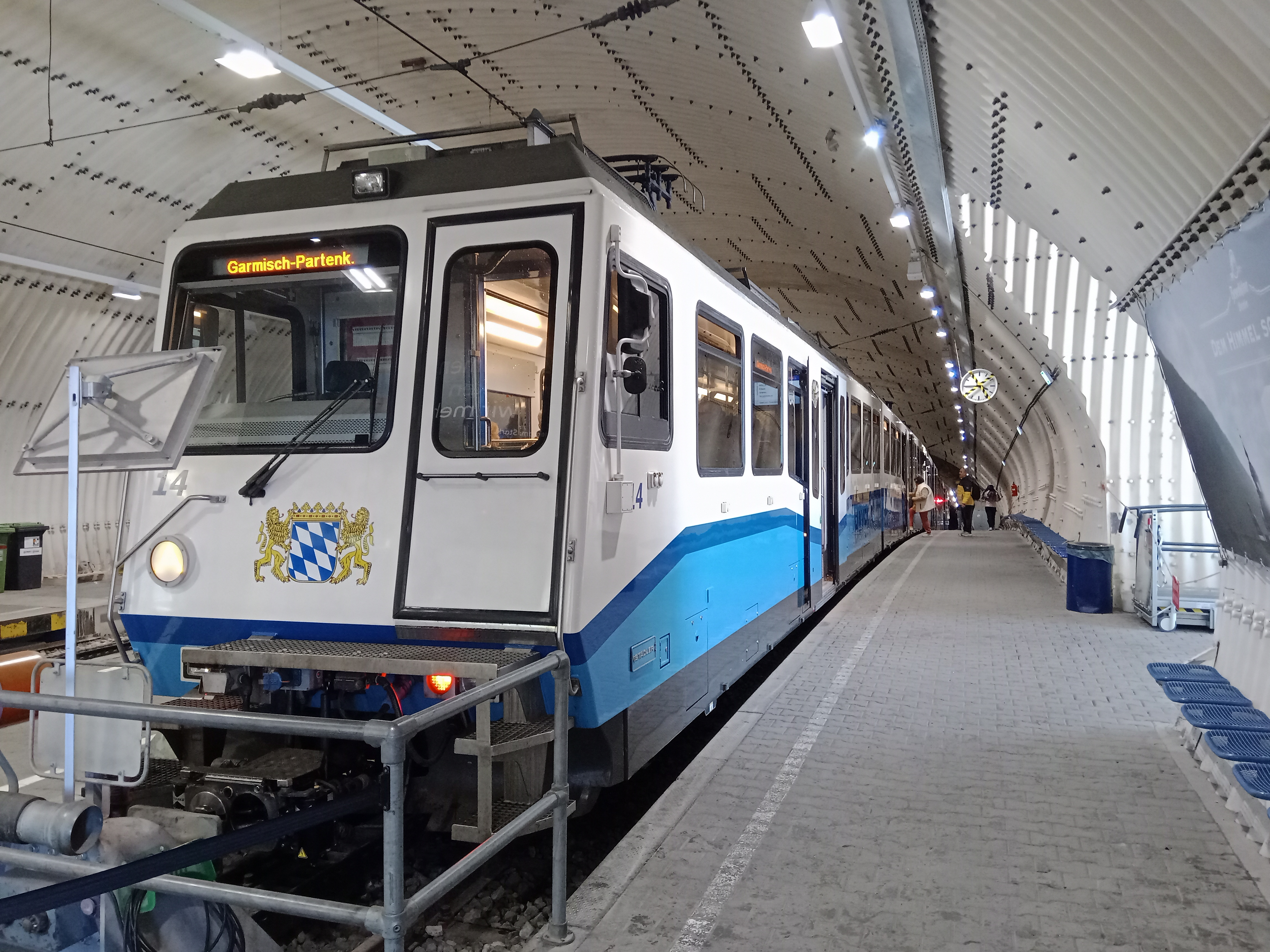

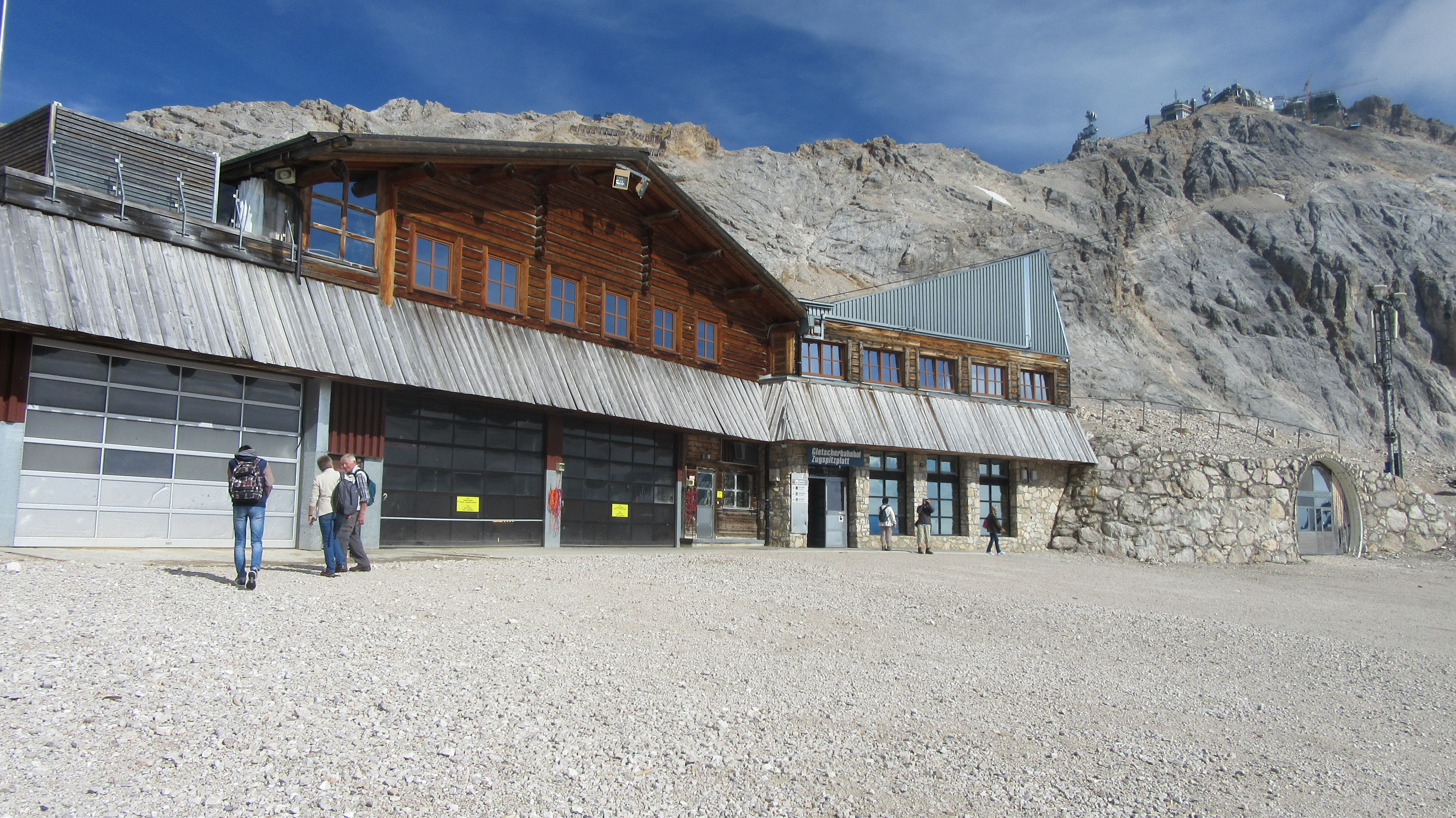
