= Ohlstadt (Verwaltungsgemeinschaft) =

- Verwaltungsgemeinschaft
- Location of Ohlstadt within Garmisch-Partenkirchen district
- Interactive map of Ohlstadt
- Location within Germany Location within Bavaria
- Coordinates: 47°38′N 11°14′E
- Country: Germany
- State: Bavaria
- Admin. region: Upper Bavaria
- District: Garmisch-Partenkirchen
- Seat: Ohlstadt
- Subdivisions: 4 municipalities

Area
  - Total: 141.81 km^{2} (54.75 sq mi)

Population (2025-12-31)
  - Total: 7,069
  - Density: 49.85/km^{2} (129.1/sq mi)
- Time zone: UTC+01:00 (CET)
  - Summer (DST): UTC+02:00 (CEST)
- Website: www.ohlstadt.de

Ohlstadt is a Verwaltungsgemeinschaft (municipal association) in the district of Garmisch-Partenkirchen in Bavaria, Germany. Its seat is in Ohlstadt.

It consists of the following municipalities:

1. Eschenlohe
2. Großweil
3. Ohlstadt
4. Schwaigen
