= Farchant station =

Railway station in Bavaria

Farchant
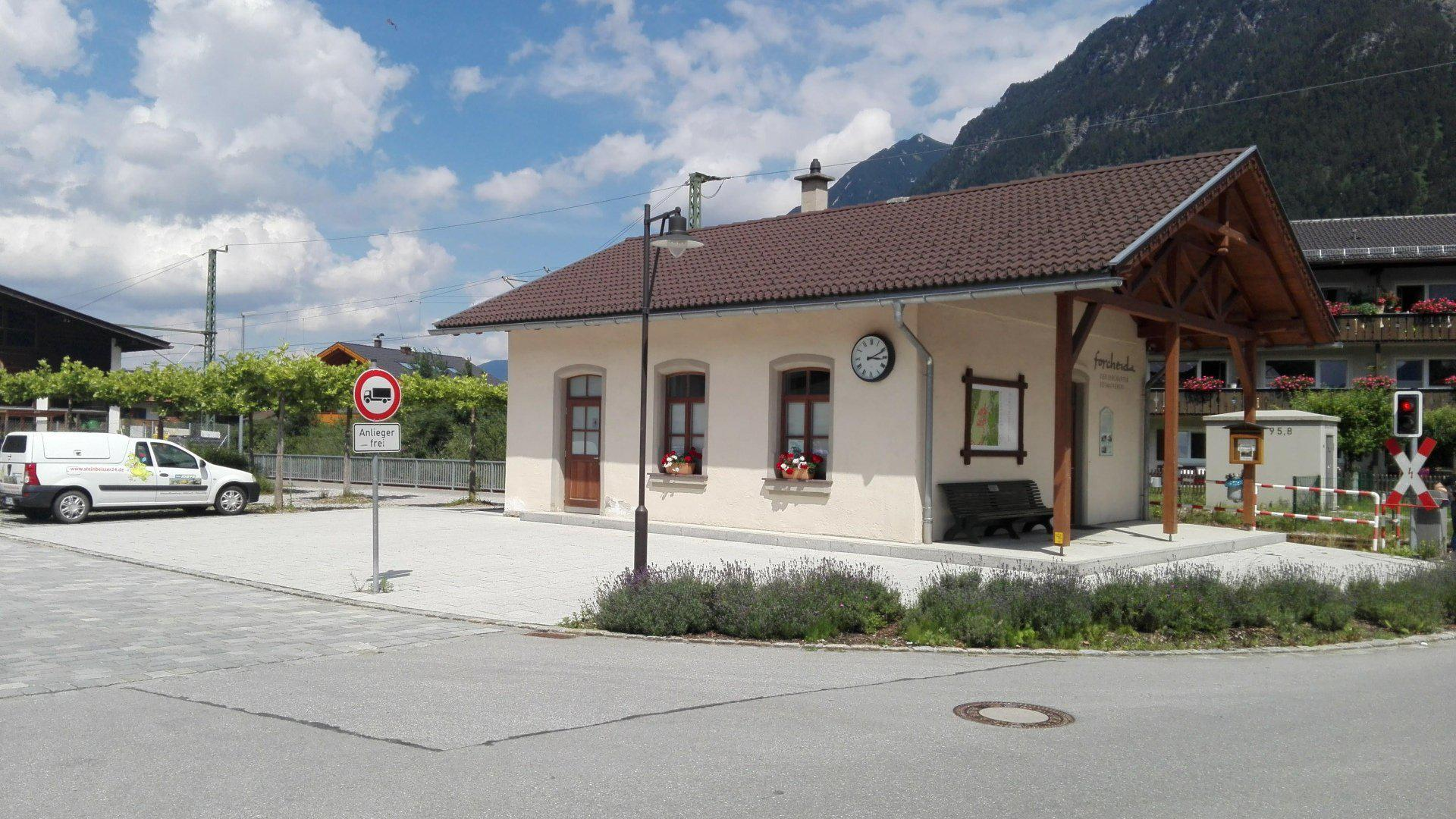
- The station building in 2018

General information
- Location: Farchant, Bavaria; Germany
- Coordinates: 47°31′52″N 11°06′54″E
- Owner: DB Netz
- Operator: DB Station&Service
- Lines: Munich–Garmisch-Partenkirchen line (KBS 960)
- Distance: 95.8 km (59.5 mi) from München Hauptbahnhof
- Platforms: 1 side platform
- Tracks: 1
- Train operators: DB Regio Bayern

Other information
- Station code: 1764
- DS100 code: MFCH
- IBNR: 8001961
- Category: 6

Services
Preceding station	DB Regio Bayern	Following station
Garmisch-Partenkirchen towards Innsbruck Hbf	RB 6	Oberau towards München Hbf
Garmisch-Partenkirchen towards Pfronten-Steinach	RB 60	Oberau towards München Hbf
Location

Farchant station (German: Bahnhof Farchant) is a railway station in the municipality of Farchant, in Bavaria, Germany. It is located on the Munich–Garmisch-Partenkirchen railway of Deutsche Bahn.

== Services ==
As of the December 2021 timetable change, the following services stopped at Farchant station:

- RB: hourly service between München Hauptbahnhof and Garmisch-Partenkirchen
- Some trains continue from Garmisch-Partenkirchen to Pfronten-Steinach, Mittenwald, Seefeld in Tirol, or Innsbruck.
