= Klais station =

Railway station in Germany

Klais
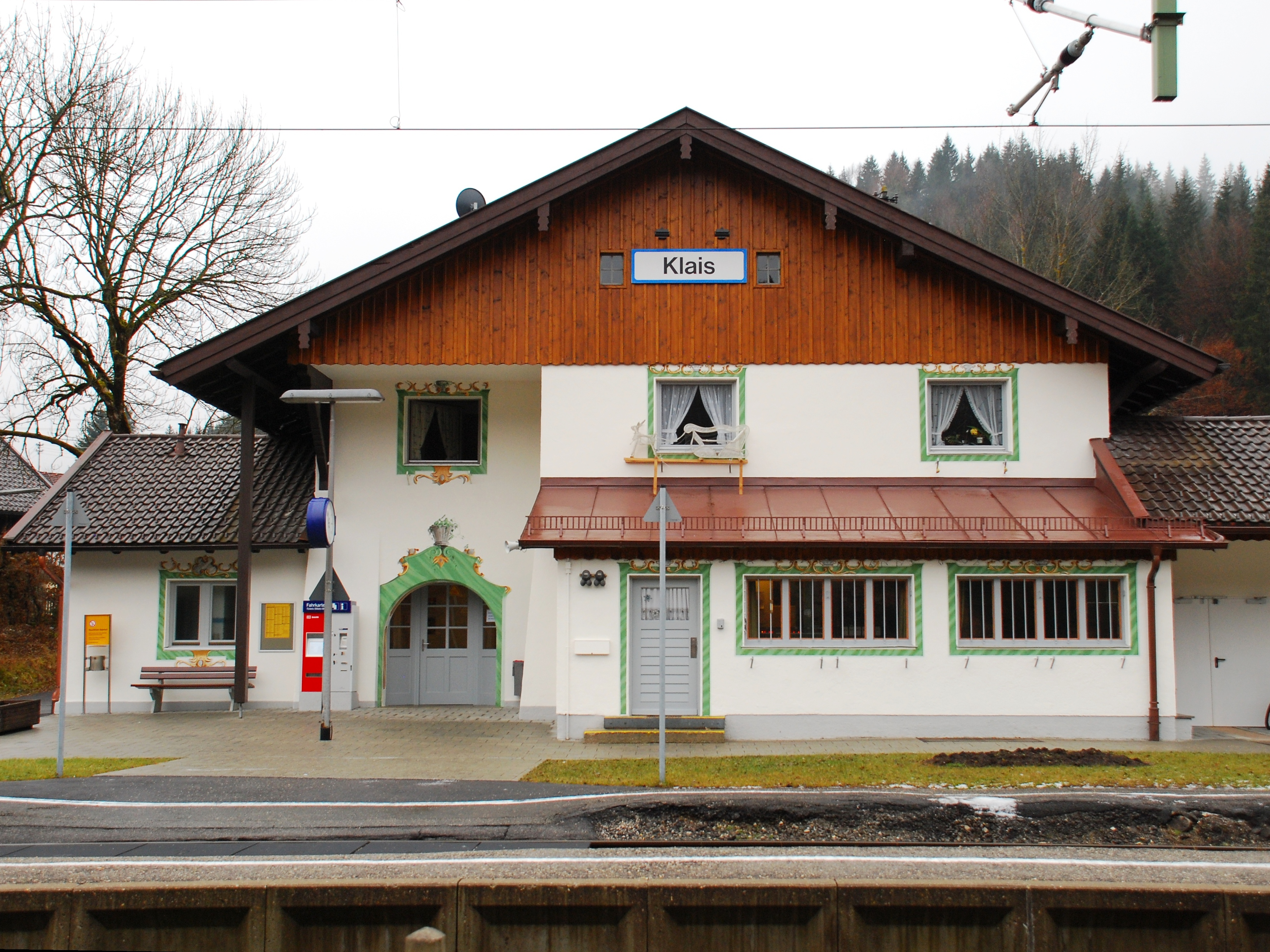
- 2011

General information
- Location: Bahnhofstraße 20; 82493 Krün; Bavaria; Germany
- Coordinates: 47°28′58″N 11°14′21″E
- Elevation: 933 m (3,061 ft)
- System: Bf
- Owner: Deutsche Bahn
- Operator: DB Station&Service
- Lines: Garmisch-Partenkirchen–Innsbruck (Mittenwald Railway) (KBS 960)
- Platforms: 2 side platforms
- Tracks: 2
- Train operators: DB Regio Bayern

Other information
- Station code: 3216
- DS100 code: MKLA
- IBNR: 8003302
- Category: 6
- Website: www.bahnhof.de

Services
Preceding station	DB Regio Bayern	Following station
Garmisch-Partenkirchen towards München Hbf	RE 61	Mittenwald Terminus
Garmisch-Partenkirchen towards München Hbf	RB 6	Mittenwald towards Innsbruck Hbf
Preceding station	Tyrol S-Bahn	Following station
Garmisch-Partenkirchen Terminus	S6	Mittenwald towards Innsbruck Hbf
Location
- Location within Bavaria Location within Germany Location within Europe

Klais station is a railway station in the Klais district of the municipality of Krün, located in the Garmisch-Partenkirchen district in Bavaria, Germany.
