= Eschenlohe =

- Municipality
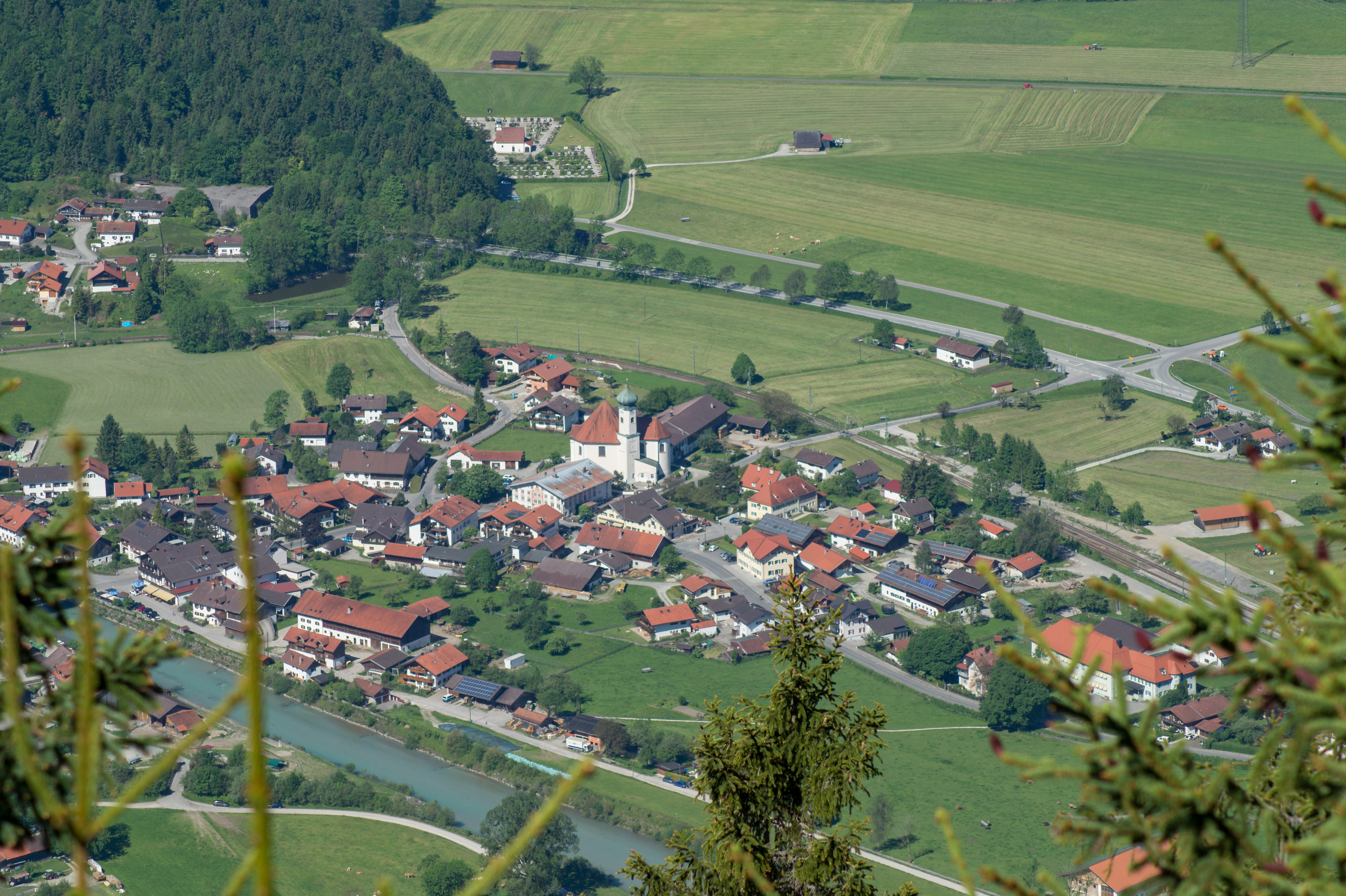
- Eschenlohe seen from the Osterfeuerspitze

- Coat of arms

- Location of Eschenlohe within Garmisch-Partenkirchen district
- Interactive map of Eschenlohe
- Location within Germany Location within Bavaria
- Coordinates: 47°36′N 11°11′E
- Country: Germany
- State: Bavaria
- Admin. region: Oberbayern
- District: Garmisch-Partenkirchen
- Municipal assoc.: Ohlstadt

Government
  - Mayor (2020–26): Anton Kölbl (CSU)

Area
  - Total: 55.05 km^{2} (21.25 sq mi)
- Elevation: 640 m (2,100 ft)

Population (2025-12-31)
  - Total: 1,557
  - Density: 28.28/km^{2} (73.25/sq mi)
- Time zone: UTC+01:00 (CET)
  - Summer (DST): UTC+02:00 (CEST)
- Postal codes: 82438
- Dialling codes: 08824
- Vehicle registration: GAP
- Website: www.eschenlohe.de

Eschenlohe is a German municipality in the district of Garmisch-Partenkirchen, in Bavaria, on the Loisach River.

== Transport ==
The district has a railway station, Eschenlohe, on the Munich–Garmisch-Partenkirchen railway.
