= Garmisch-Partenkirchen station =

Railway station in Garmisch-Partenkirchen, Bavaria, Germany

Garmisch-Partenkirchen
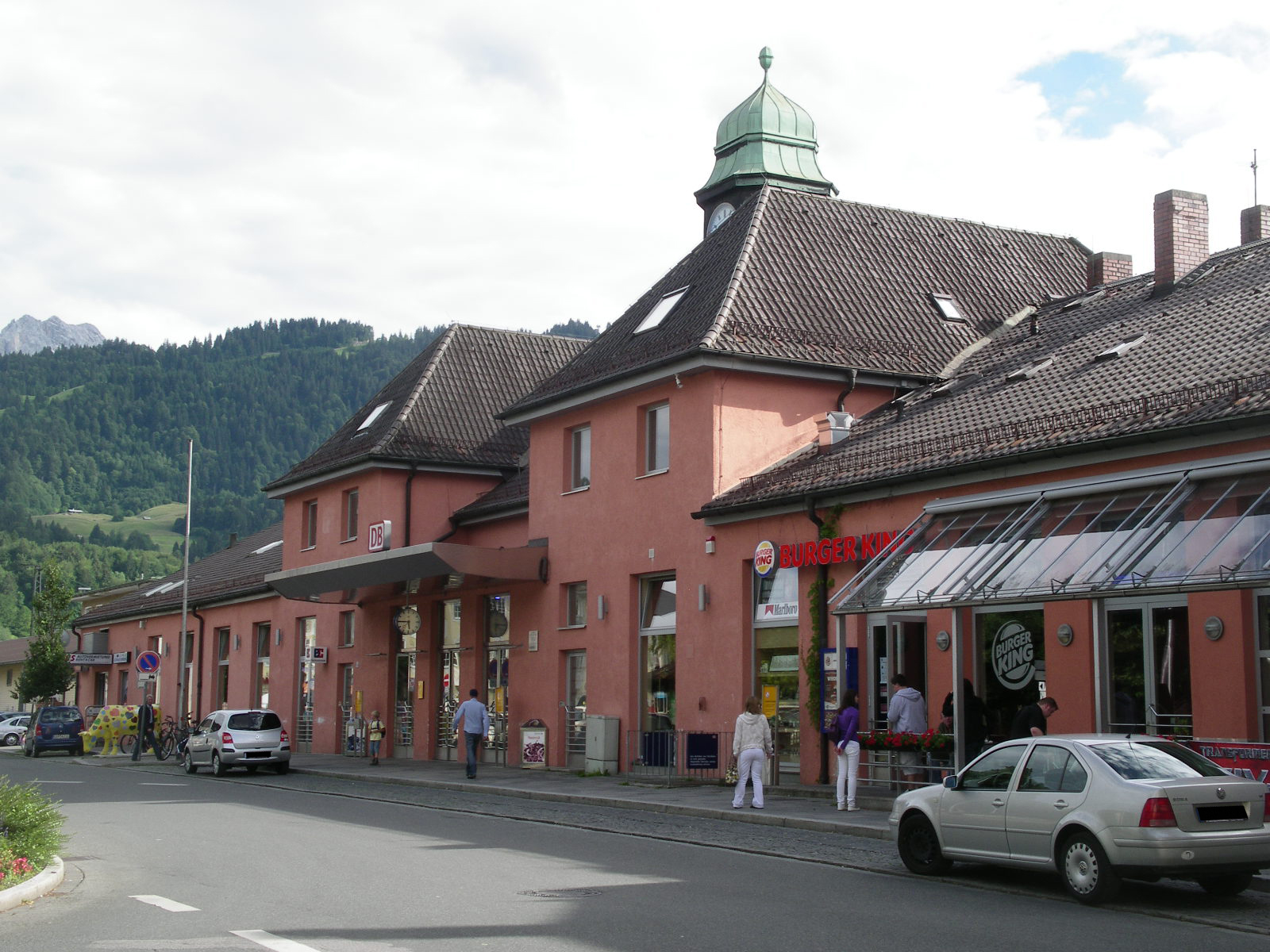

General information
- Location: Bahnhofstr. 31, Garmisch-Partenkirchen, Bavaria; Germany
- Coordinates: 47°29′29″N 11°05′49″E
- Owner: Deutsche Bahn
- Operator: DB Netz; DB Station&Service
- Lines: Munich–Garmisch-Partenkirchen (KBS 960); Garmisch-Partenkirchen–Innsbruck (Mittenwald Railway) (KBS 960); Reutte/Tirol–Garmisch-Partenkirchen (Ausserfern Railway) (KBS 965)
- Platforms: 2 island platforms; 1 side platform
- Tracks: 5

Construction
- Accessible: Yes

Other information
- Station code: 2014
- DS100 code: MGP
- IBNR: 8002187
- Category: 3
- Website: stationsdatenbank.de; www.bahnhof.de

History
- Opening: 25 July 1889; 137 years ago
- Electrified: 28 October 1912; 113 years ago

Services
Preceding station	DB Fernverkehr	Following station
Murnau towards Saarbrücken Hbf	ICE 60 Limited service	Terminus
Preceding station	DB Regio Bayern	Following station
Klais towards Mittenwald	RE 61	Murnau towards München Hbf
Garmisch-Partenkirchen Hausberg towards Lermoos	RE 62 Limited service	Murnau One-way operation
Klais towards Innsbruck Hbf	RB 6	Farchant towards München Hbf
Garmisch-Partenkirchen Hausberg towards Pfronten-Steinach	RB 60	Farchant towards München Hbf
Preceding station	Tyrol S-Bahn	Following station
Terminus	S6	Klais towards Innsbruck Hbf
Location
- Location within Bavaria Location within Germany Location within Europe

Garmisch-Partenkirchen station (German: Garmisch-Partenkirchen Bahnhof) is a junction station in the German State of Bavaria. It is the biggest station in Garmisch-Partenkirchen. It has five platform tracks and is classified by Deutsche Bahn as a category 3 station. The station has about 50 services daily operated by DB Regio and some long-distance services operated by Deutsche Bahn. It is on the lines connecting Munich and Garmisch-Partenkirchen, Garmisch-Partenkirchen and Innsbruck (the Mittenwald Railway) and Garmisch-Partenkirchen and Reutte (the Ausserfern Railway).

== History ==
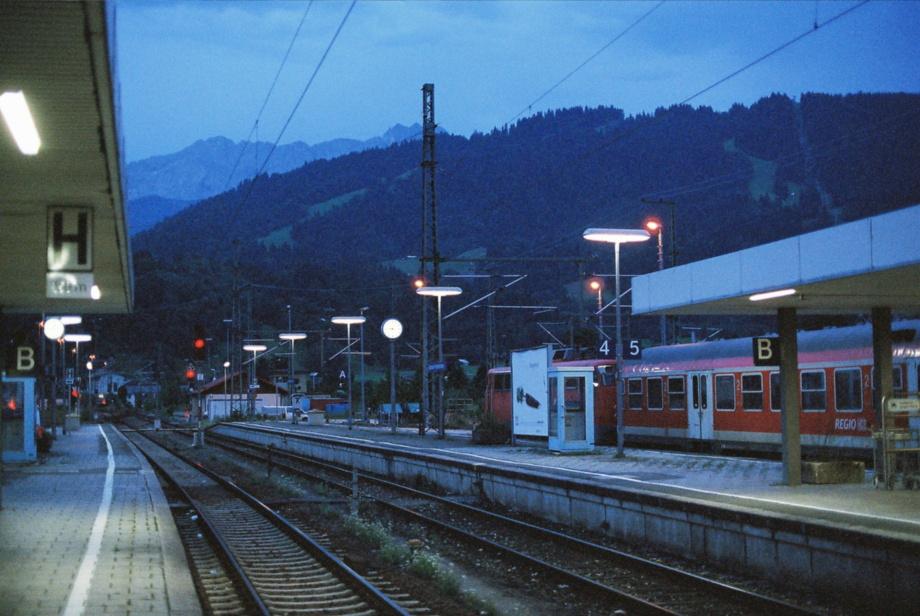
Looking towards Mittenwald

The station was established on 25 July 1889 as the terminus of a branch line from Munich opened by Lokalbahn AG. It was initially connected to Munich by four to six pairs of trains daily. On 1 July 1912, was the line was extended with the opening of the Mittenwald Railway and Garmisch-Partenkirchen was now a through station. The line was electrified in the course of the extension of the Mittenwald line to Innsbruck, opened on 25 April 1913. In May 1913, the Ausserfern Railway was opened from Reutte to the station. This was electrified from the start.

A special feature for decades was the operational stop for Austrian through trains between Innsbruck and Reutte. This was necessary so that trains could reverse direction in Garmisch-Partenkirchen, but passengers were not allowed on or off, which would have required customs and immigration clearance until the implementation of the Schengen Agreement.

On 12 December 1995 the Garmisch-Partenkirchen train collision at the station, when a departing RegioExpress train smashed into an arriving touristic train after passing a signal at danger, injuring 41 and killing one.

On 3 June 2022 the Garmisch-Partenkirchen train derailment happened to the north of the station when several carriages of a departing regio train derailed, killing five people and injuring 68 others.

== Description ==
The station lies between the two districts of Garmisch in the west and Partenkirchen in the east. The railway yards are located at Garmisch area. The Partnach flows between the station and Partenkirchen. The station area is bordered to the east by Bahnhofstraße and to the west by Weitfelderstraße and Olympiastraße. Sankt-Martin-Straße passes through an underpass under the station area. The entrance building was modernised and renovated in the late 1990s and it is located on the eastern side of the railway facilities towards Partenkirchen. Its address is 31 Bahnhofstraße.

In addition to the home platform, there are two more platforms. Behind it there are five tracks for train parking and freight operations.

The platforms are covered and accessible via lifts and stairways. The platform roofs were renewed from October 2009 to January 2011 and the platforms were fitted with tactile paving. The station building includes shops and a ticket office. It is served by the public bus network.

== Rail services ==
Garmisch-Partenkirchen is served by a few Intercity-Express services (seasonally on weekends) operated by Deutsche Bahn as well as Regionalbahn and peak Regional-Express services operated by DB Regio between Munich and Garmisch-Partenkirchen. The Regionalbahn services run every two hours to/from Seefeld in Tirol and every four hours to/from Innsbruck, Reutte. Trains run to/from Reutte every hour on weekdays. Most of the trains from Munich are divided in Garmisch-Partenkirchen, with one part going to Mittenwald or Innsbruck and the other to Reutte. Similarly the trains from Mittenwald or Innsbruck are mostly coupled in Garmisch-Partenkirchen with trains from Reutte before proceeding to Munich. In the 2026 timetable, the following services stop at the station:

Line	Route	Frequency
ICE 60	Saarbrücken – Kaiserslautern – Mannheim – Stuttgart – Ulm – Augsburg – Munich – Munich – Murnau – Garmisch-Partenkirchen	1 train pair on some Sats and Suns
RB 6/S6	Munich – Tutzing – Weilheim – Murnau – Garmisch-Partenkirchen (– Mittenwald – Seefeld in Tirol (– Innsbruck))	Hourly, every two hours to Seefeld, every four hours as S6 to Innsbruck
S6	Garmisch-Partenkirchen – Mittenwald – Seefeld in Tirol – Innsbruck	Every four hours
RB 60; S7	Garmisch-Partenkirchen – Ehrwald Zugspitzbahn – Reutte – Vils Stadt – Pfronten-Steinach	Hourly
RE 61	Munich – Weilheim – Murnau – Garmisch-Partenkirchen – Mittenwald	Some trains
RE 62	Munich – Weilheim – Murnau – Garmisch-Partenkirchen – Ehrwald Zugspitzbahn – Lermoos	Some trains

The following local buses (operated by the municipal utility) and regional bus lines (Oberbayernbus) as well as the long-distance FlixBus stop at or near the station:

Line	Type	Route
1	Local bus	Klinikum – Bahnhof – Marienplatz – Äußere Maximilianstraße
2	Local bus	Klinikum – Bahnhof – Marienplatz – Kreuzeck (Alpspitzbahn)
3/4	Local bus	Farchant – Friedhof Partenkirchen – Wankbahn – Bahnhof – Marienplatz – Burgrain – Farchant
3/5	Local bus	Farchant – Burgrain – Marienplatz – Bahnhof – Wankbahn – Friedhof Partenkirchen – Farchant
EVG	'White-blue bus'	Sebastianskirche – Bahnhof – Marienplatz – Grainau – Eibsee
9606	Regional bus	Garmisch-Partenkirchen Post/Bf – Oberau – Oberammergau (– Echelsbach Bridge – Füssen/Wieskirche)
9608	Regional bus	Garmisch-Partenkirchen Post/Bf – Mittenwald – Krün – Wallgau (– Kochel am See)
MFB 040	long-distance bus	Munich Airport – Garmisch-Partenkirchen – Mittenwald - Seefeld - Innsbruck
FlixBus	long-distance bus	Garmisch-Partenkirchen – Innsbruck - Bozen - Verona – Venice

== Garmisch-Partenkirchen Zugspitzbahn station ==
Garmisch-Partenkirchen Zugspitzbahnhof
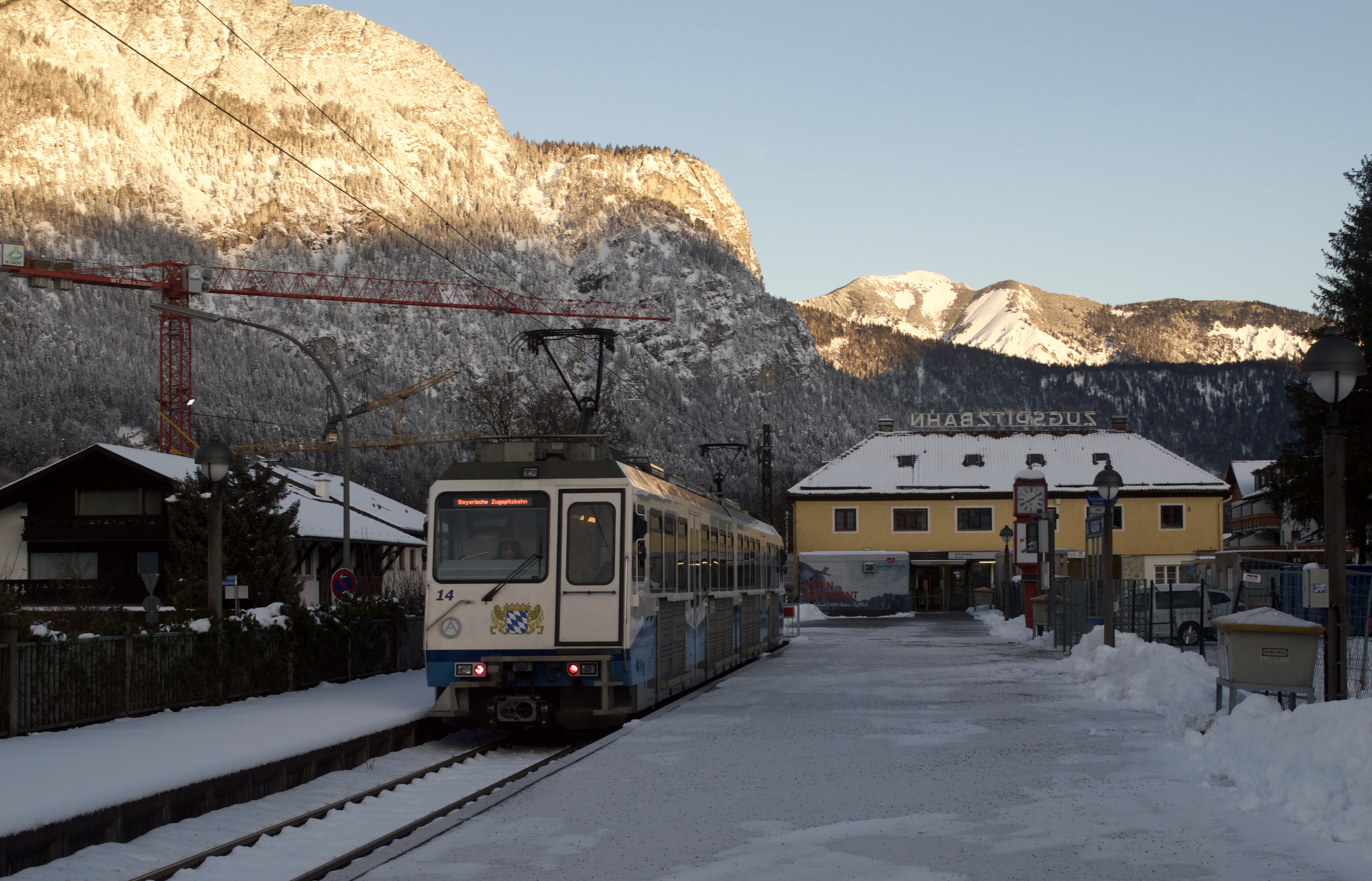

General information
- Location: Olympiastr. 27, Garmisch-Partenkirchen, Bavaria; Germany
- Coordinates: 47°29′25″N 11°05′46″E
- Owner: Bayerische Zugspitzbahn
- Operator: Bayerische Zugspitzbahn
- Lines: Bavarian Zugspitze Railway (KBS 11031)
- Platforms: 1 side platform
- Tracks: 2

Construction
- Accessible: Yes

Other information
- Website: stationsdatenbank.de

Services
Preceding station	Bayerische Zugspitzbahn	Following station
Garmisch-Partenkirchen Hausberg towards Grainau	RB 64	Terminus
Location
- Location within Bavaria Location within Germany Location within Europe

In the immediate neighbourhood, the Bavarian Zugspitze Railway (Bayerische Zugspitzbahn, BZB) has operated since 1929 a separate terminal station, called Garmisch station. Unofficially, it is sometimes called Zugspitze station (Zugspitzbahnhof). Since a restoration, it consists of two tracks (without a number) with a side platform on the southern track, a siding at the entrance to the station and a new entrance building at the side of the tracks.

Line	Route	Frequency
RB 64	Garmisch-Partenkirchen – Grainau	Hourly
