= Grainau station =

Train station in Grainau, Germany

Grainau
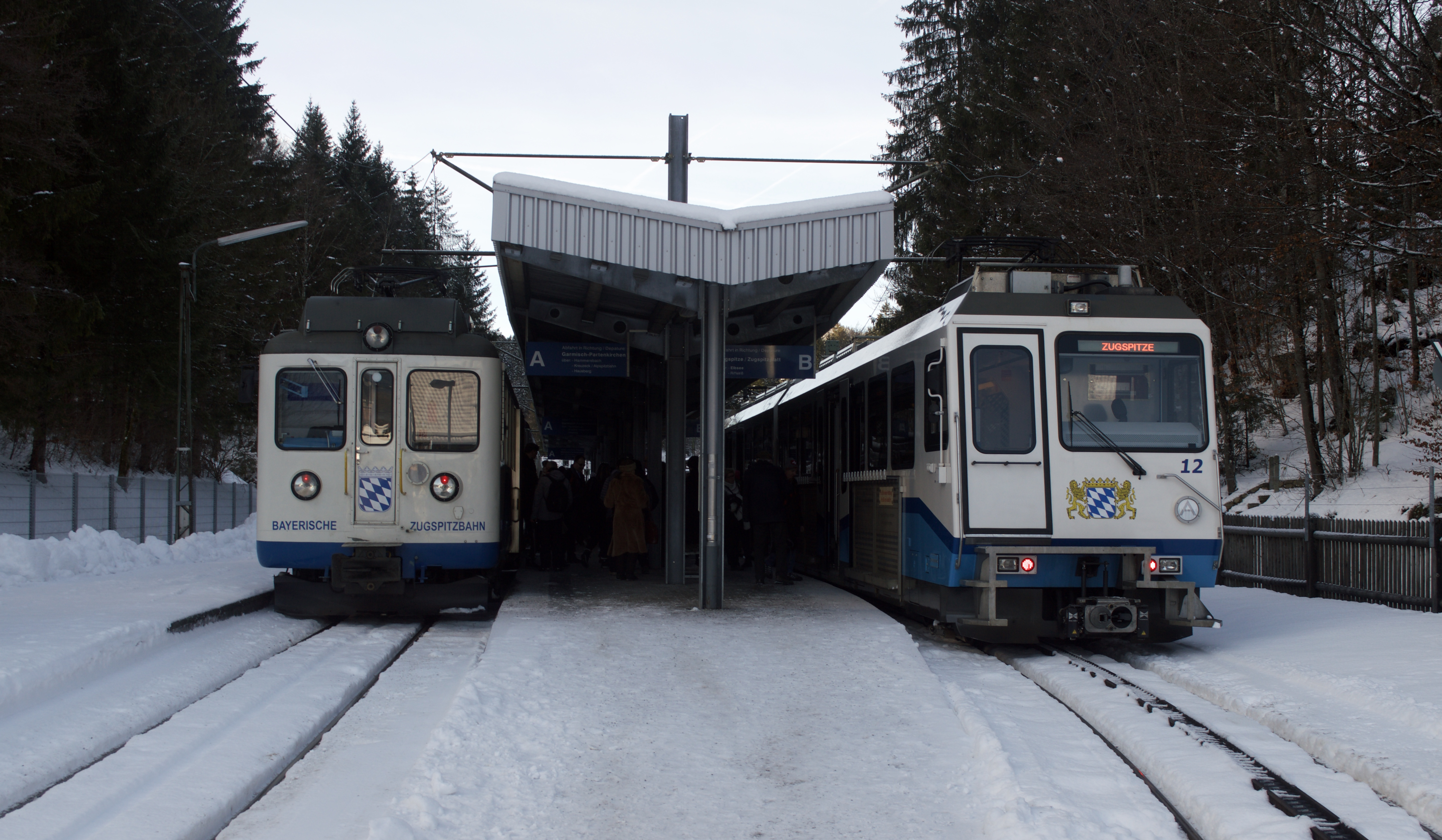
- 2020

General information
- Location: Gumpenau 3; 82491 Grainau; Bavaria; Germany
- Coordinates: 47.47200°N 11.02470°E
- System: Hp
- Owner: Bayerische Zugspitzbahn
- Operator: Bayerische Zugspitzbahn
- Lines: Bavarian Zugspitze Railway (KBS 11031)
- Platforms: 1 side platform 1 island platform
- Tracks: 2
- Train operators: Bayerische Zugspitzbahn
- Connections: 9840

Construction
- Parking: yes
- Cycle facilities: no
- Accessible: yes

Services
Preceding station	Bayerische Zugspitzbahn	Following station
Terminus	RB 64	Hammersbach towards Garmisch-Partenkirchen
Eibsee towards Zugspitzplatt	Rack railway	Terminus
Location
- Location within Bavaria Location within Germany Location within Europe

Grainau station (German: Zugspitzbahnhof Grainau) is a railway station on the Bavarian Zugspitze Railway (Bayerische Zugspitzbahn), situated in Grainau, southern Bavaria, Germany, at approximately 750 meters (2,460 feet) above sea level. Positioned between the Obergrainau and Untergrainau districts, near the parish church and Badersee lake, it was originally named Grainau-Badersee. The station serves as the operational hub of the line, marking the transition from the adhesion-based valley section from Garmisch-Partenkirchen to the rack railway section ascending toward the Zugspitze via Eibsee.

== History ==
The station opened on December 19, 1929, as part of the second construction phase of the Bavarian Zugspitze Railway, connecting Garmisch-Partenkirchen to Grainau. The line was extended to the Zugspitze summit by July 8, 1930. Grainau station has since been a vital hub for tourists and locals accessing the Wetterstein Alps.

== Station ==
The single-story station building includes a waiting room with a ticket counter and a control room for the train dispatcher. Grainau boasts the most extensive track infrastructure on the route. Originally, it featured two platform tracks with outer platforms and a central passing track, allowing trains to be split or combined. Until the use of pilot cars ceased, all trains stopped at the 199.9-meter-long Platform 2, divided into sections for Garmisch-Partenkirchen and Eibsee–Schneefernerhaus routes, requiring passengers to transfer across the platform. In 2000, a covered central platform was added to streamline transfers, with the two tracks now labeled A and B. On Track A, trains open doors on both sides, including toward the retained outer platform.

As the endpoint of the valley section and the start of the Riggenbach rack system, Grainau station is a critical junction.

== Gallery ==
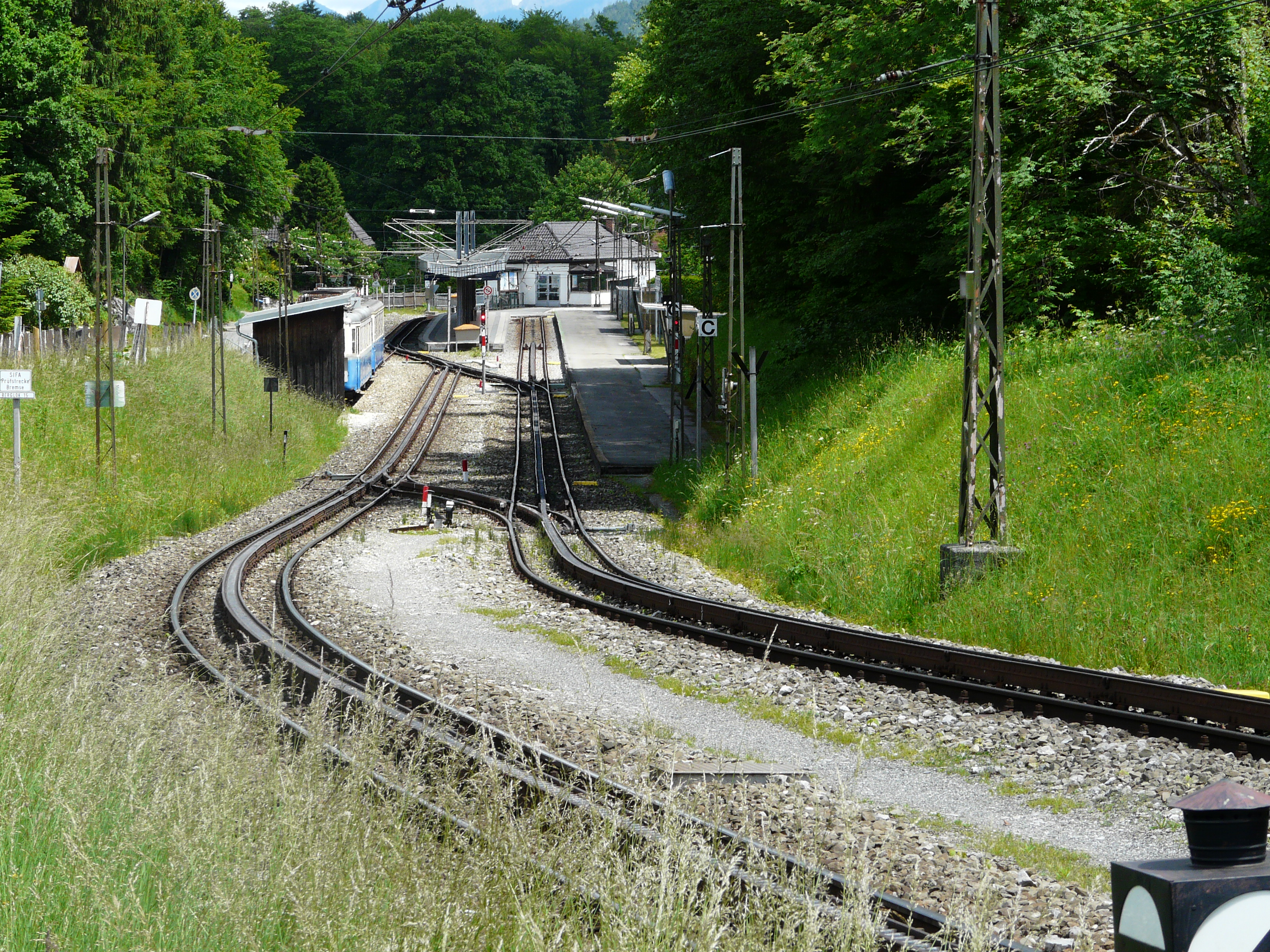
Overview

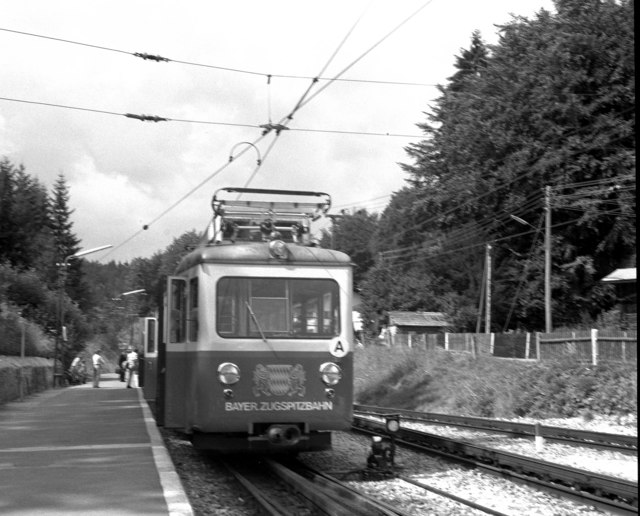
Station in 1982

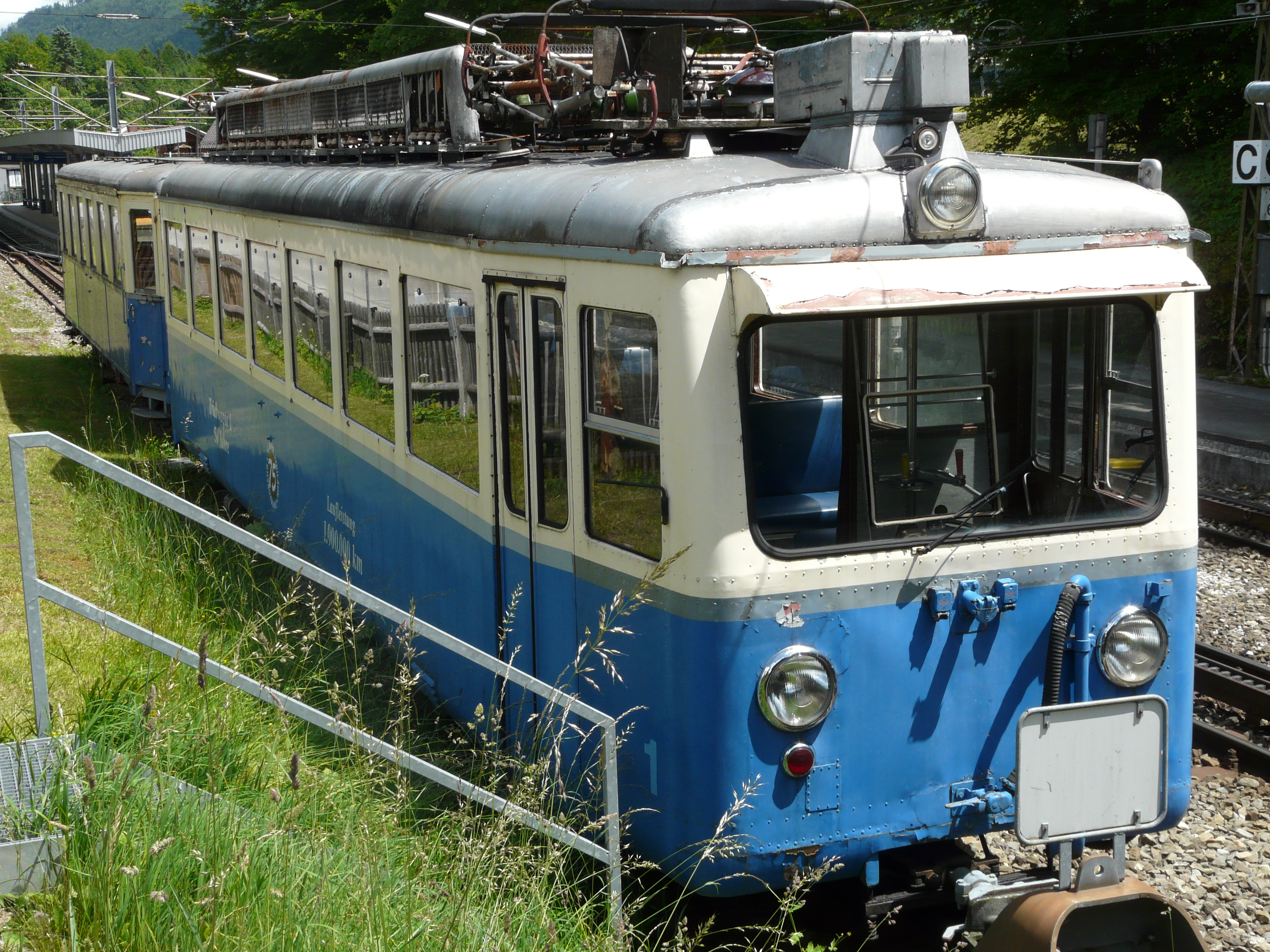
Train at Grainau
