= Hausberg (Garmisch-Partenkirchen) =

Mountain in Germany

The Hausberg is, with 1,335 m (4,380 ft) above sea level, the Hausberg of Garmisch-Partenkirchen, Bavaria, Germany and is especially popular for hiking and mountain bike tours and in winter for skiing, as it is also part of the skiing area Garmisch.

Since 1969 the Hausbergbahn has been leading up the mountain.

Since 2002, the event site at the foot of the Hausberg has hosted the BMW Motorrad Days every first weekend in July.
