= Ohlstadt =

- Municipality
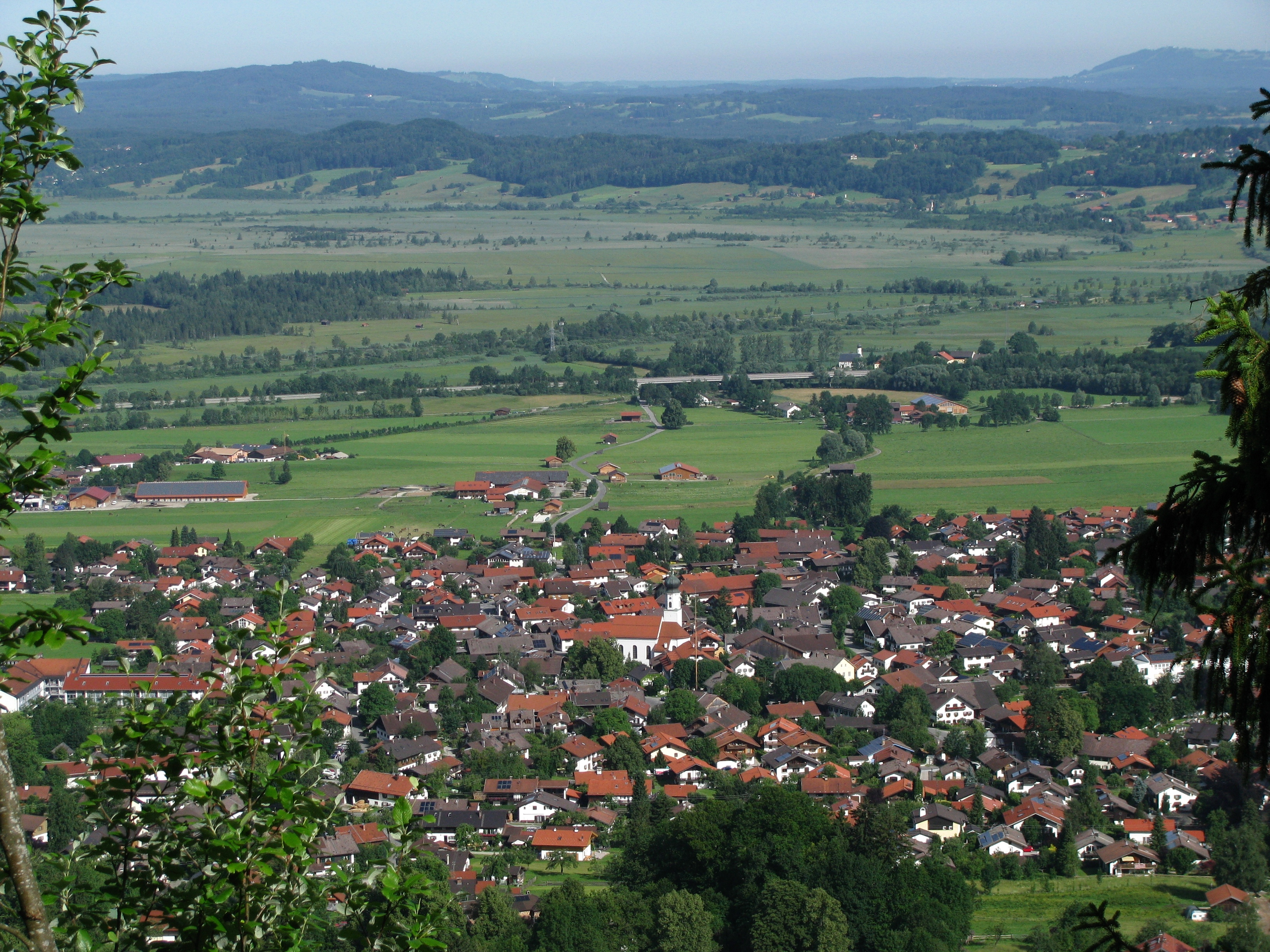
- Ohlstadt

- Coat of arms

- Location of Ohlstadt within Garmisch-Partenkirchen district
- Interactive map of Ohlstadt
- Location within Germany Location within Bavaria
- Coordinates: 47°38′N 11°14′E
- Country: Germany
- State: Bavaria
- Admin. region: Oberbayern
- District: Garmisch-Partenkirchen
- Municipal assoc.: Ohlstadt

Government
  - Mayor (2020–26): Christian Scheuerer (Ind.)

Area
  - Total: 41.17 km^{2} (15.90 sq mi)
- Elevation: 665 m (2,182 ft)

Population (2025-12-31)
  - Total: 3,291
  - Density: 79.94/km^{2} (207.0/sq mi)
- Time zone: UTC+01:00 (CET)
  - Summer (DST): UTC+02:00 (CEST)
- Postal codes: 82441
- Dialling codes: 08841
- Vehicle registration: GAP
- Website: www.ohlstadt.de

Ohlstadt is a municipality in the district of Garmisch-Partenkirchen, in Bavaria, Germany.

== Transport ==
The district has a railway station, Ohlstadt, on the Munich–Garmisch-Partenkirchen railway.

== Notable people ==
- Wolfgang Zimmerer (born 1940, in Ohlstadt) retired bobsledder, competed as a driver with his brakeman Peter Utzschneider from Murnau am Staffelsee. Zimmerer took part in the 1968, 1972 and 1976 Winter Olympics.
- Friedrich August von Kaulbach had a country house in Ohlstadt. The Kaulbach-Villa is now a museum open to the public. Kaulbach died in Ohlstadt in 1920.
