= Farchant =

- Municipality
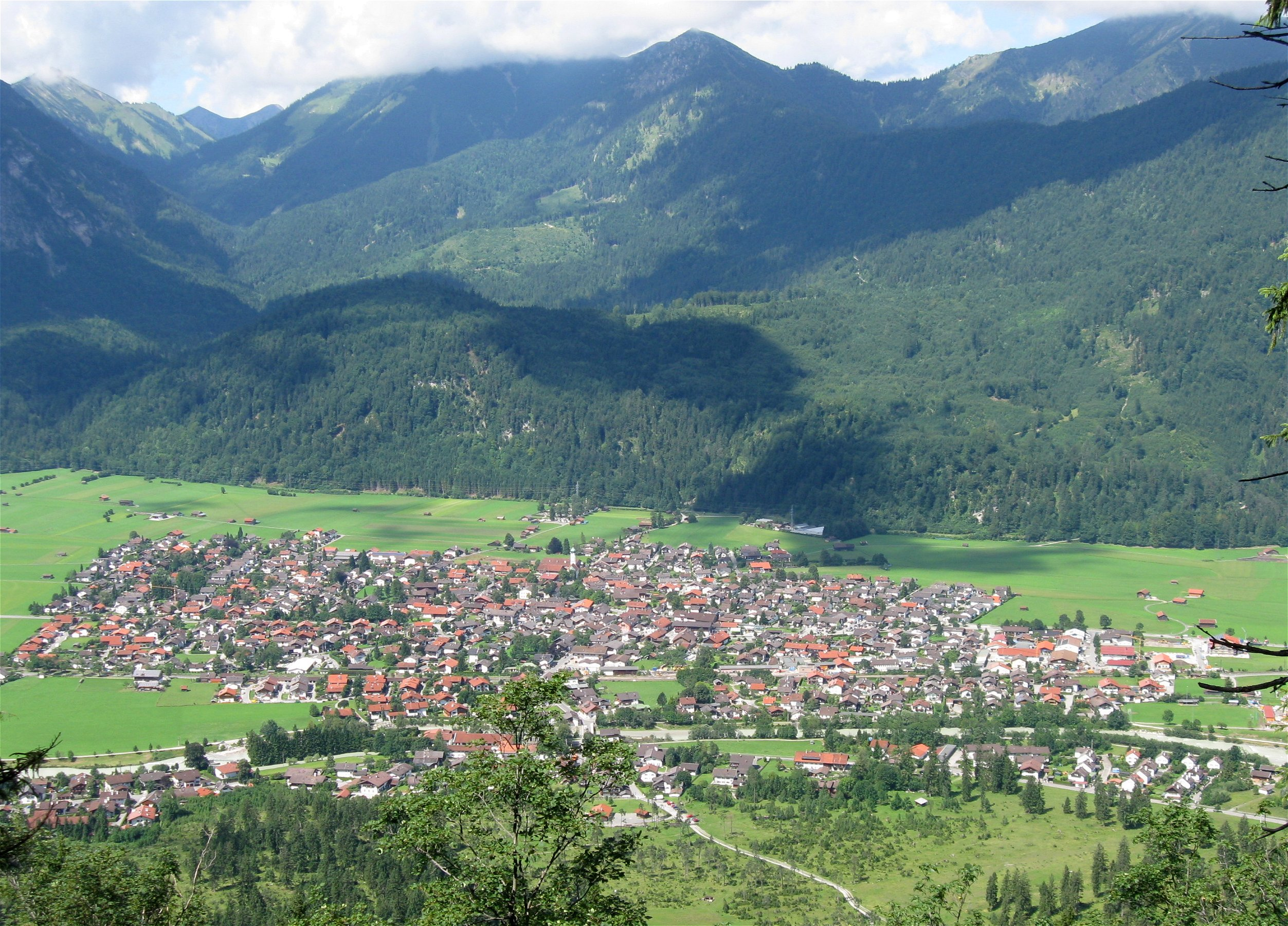
- Farchant seen from Estergebirge

- Coat of arms

- Location of Farchant within Garmisch-Partenkirchen district
- Interactive map of Farchant
- Location within Germany Location within Bavaria
- Coordinates: 47°32′N 11°7′E
- Country: Germany
- State: Bavaria
- Admin. region: Oberbayern
- District: Garmisch-Partenkirchen

Government
  - Mayor (2020–26): Christian Hornsteiner (CSU)

Area
  - Total: 25.76 km^{2} (9.95 sq mi)
- Elevation: 672 m (2,205 ft)

Population (2025-12-31)
  - Total: 3,563
  - Density: 138.3/km^{2} (358.2/sq mi)
- Time zone: UTC+01:00 (CET)
  - Summer (DST): UTC+02:00 (CEST)
- Postal codes: 82490
- Dialling codes: 08821
- Vehicle registration: GAP
- Website: www.gemeinde-farchant.de

Farchant is a municipality in the district of Garmisch-Partenkirchen, in Bavaria, Germany.

== Transport ==
The district has a railway station, Farchant, on the Munich–Garmisch-Partenkirchen railway.
