= Oberau =

- Municipality
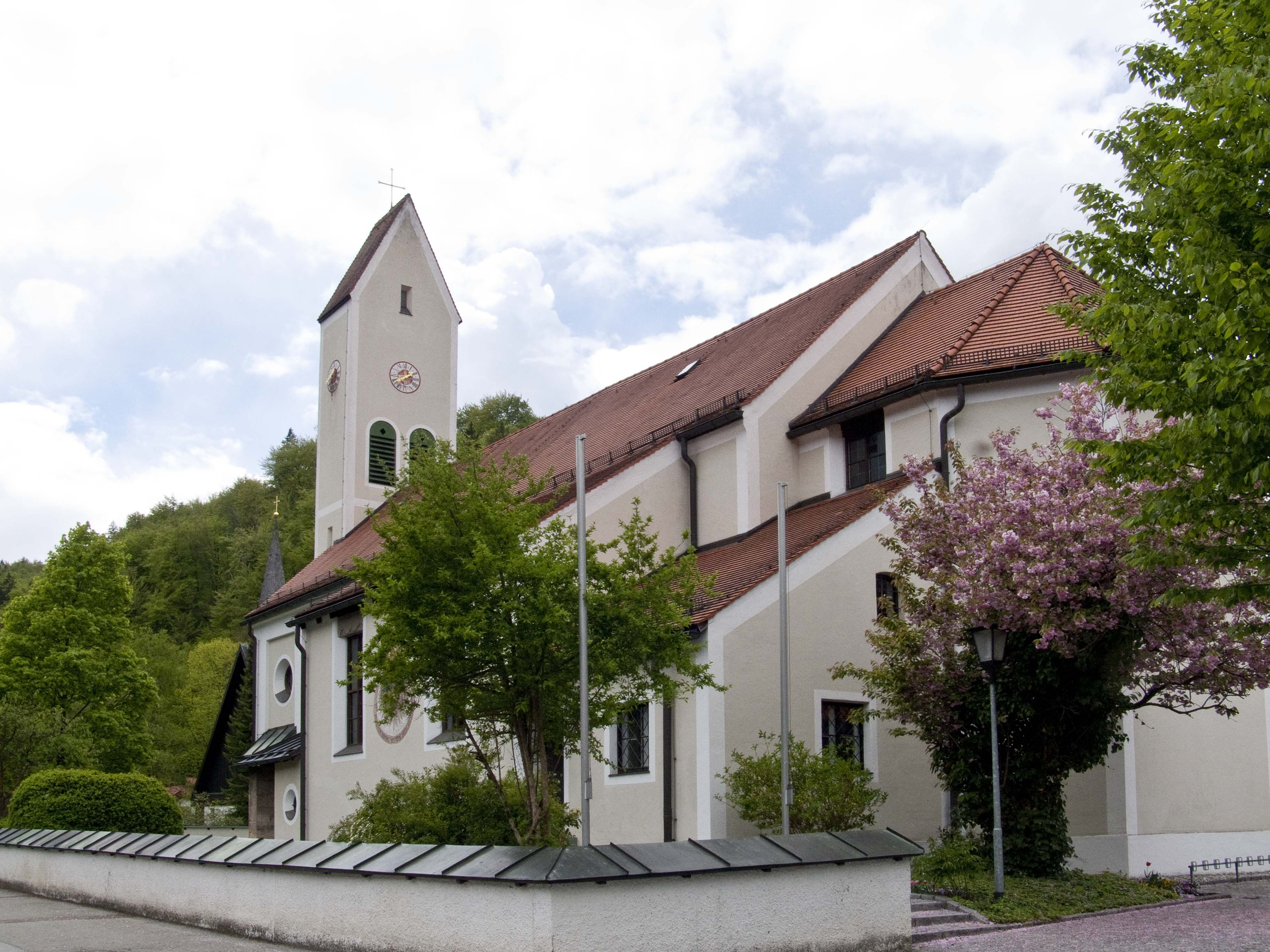
- Church of Saint Ludwig

- Coat of arms

- Location of Oberau within Garmisch-Partenkirchen district
- Interactive map of Oberau
- Location within Germany Location within Bavaria
- Coordinates: 47°33′N 11°8′E
- Country: Germany
- State: Bavaria
- Admin. region: Oberbayern
- District: Garmisch-Partenkirchen

Government
  - Mayor (2020–26): Peter Imminger (CSU)

Area
  - Total: 17.86 km^{2} (6.90 sq mi)
- Elevation: 659 m (2,162 ft)

Population (2025-12-31)
  - Total: 3,125
  - Density: 175.0/km^{2} (453.2/sq mi)
- Time zone: UTC+01:00 (CET)
  - Summer (DST): UTC+02:00 (CEST)
- Postal codes: 82496
- Dialling codes: 08824
- Vehicle registration: GAP
- Website: www.oberau.de

Oberau is a municipality in the district of Garmisch-Partenkirchen, in Bavaria, Germany.

== Geography ==
=== Location ===
Oberau is located at the Loisach in the so-called "Zugspitzland". The distance between the village center and Garmisch-Partenkirchen is 8 km, whereas Oberammergau lies to the northwest (about 9 km away). The Bavarian capital Munich is 72 km away, while Innsbruck in Austrian Tyrol is 70 km away.

In addition to the parish village of Oberau, the hamlet of Buchwies, located about one kilometer east of the village, is an integral administrative part of the municipality.

== Transport ==
The district has a railway station, Oberau, on the Munich–Garmisch-Partenkirchen railway.
