= Bundesstraße 2 =

Federal highway in Germany

B 2
- Bundesstraße 2

Route information
- Length: 721 km (448 mi)

Location
- Country: Germany
- States: Brandenburg, Berlin, Saxony-Anhalt, Saxony, Thuringia, Bavaria

Highway system
- Roads in Germany; Autobahns; List; Federal; List; State; E-roads

The Bundesstraße 2 (abbr. B2) is a German federal highway, running around 800 kilometres (Note: Length varies by source) from the Polish border near Gartz to the Austrian border near Garmisch-Partenkirchen. From north to south; it passes through major cities such as Berlin, Potsdam, Leipzig, Bayreuth, Nuremberg, Augsburg, and Munich. It is largely paralleled by Bundesautobahn 9, and a small portion coincides with Bundesautobahn 952.

It corresponds to a long portion of the Via Imperii of the Holy Roman Empire which continued all the way to Venice via the Brenner Pass. In Berlin B2 forms among others the following squares and streets Alexanderplatz, Karl-Liebknecht-Straße, Unter den Linden, Straße des 17. Juni, Großer Stern, Kaiserdamm, Theodor-Heuss-Platz, and Heerstraße.
