= Mittenwald station =

Railway station in Mittenwald, Germany

Mittenwald
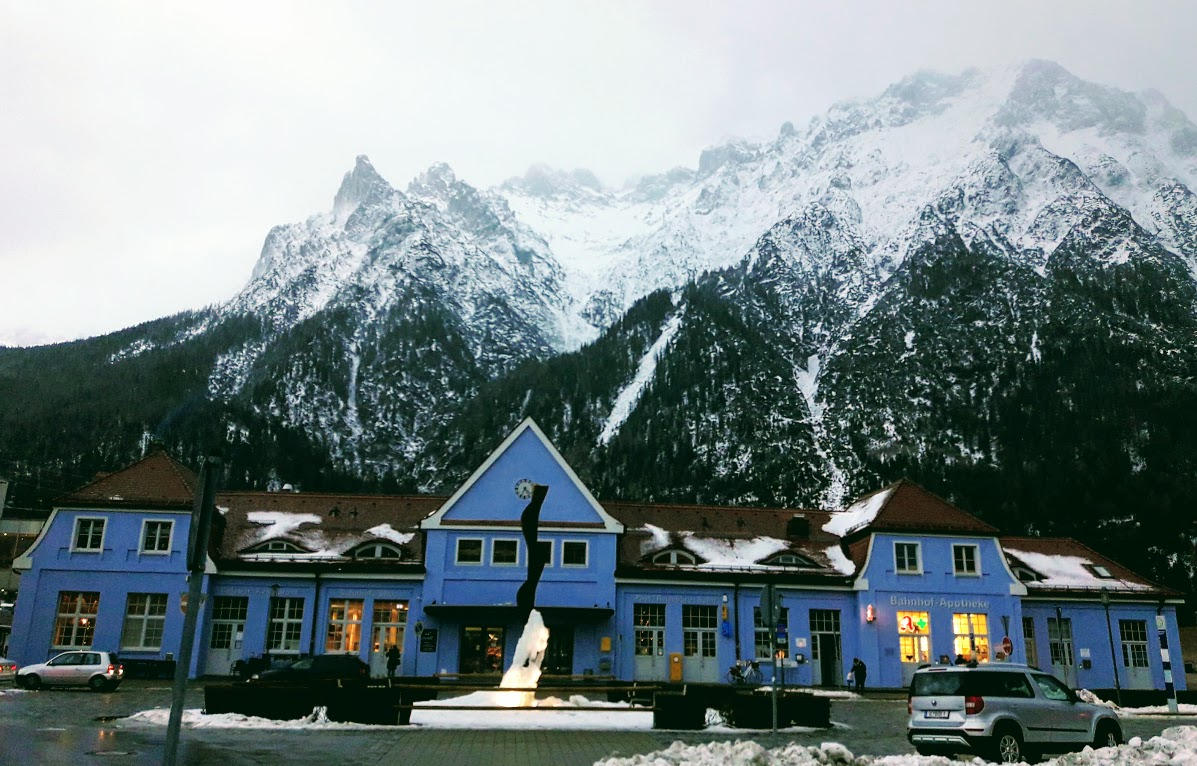
- The station building with the Karwendel mountains in the background

General information
- Location: Bahnhofplatz 8; 82481 Mittenwald; Bavaria; Germany
- Coordinates: 47°26′24″N 11°15′57″E
- Elevation: 914 m (2,999 ft)
- Owner: DB Netz
- Operator: DB Station&Service
- Lines: Garmisch-Partenkirchen–Innsbruck (Mittenwald Railway) (KBS 960)
- Platforms: 1 island platform 1 side platform
- Tracks: 4
- Train operators: DB Regio Bayern

Other information
- Station code: 4134
- DS100 code: MMW
- IBNR: 8004043
- Category: 4
- Website: www.bahnhof.de

History
- Opened: 1 July 1912; 114 years ago

Services
Preceding station	DB Fernverkehr	Following station
Garmisch-Partenkirchen towards Hamburg-Altona	ICE 24 Seasonal	Seefeld in Tirol towards Innsbruck Hbf
Preceding station	DB Regio Bayern	Following station
Klais towards München Hbf	RE 61	Terminus
Klais towards München Hbf	RB 6	through to S6
Preceding station	Tyrol S-Bahn	Following station
through to RB 6	S6	Scharnitz towards Innsbruck Hbf
Klais towards Garmisch-Partenkirchen	S6	Scharnitz towards Innsbruck Hbf
Location
- Location within Bavaria Location within Germany Location within Europe

Mittenwald station (German: Bahnhof Mittenwald) is a railway station in the German State of Bavaria, in the town of Mittenwald. It has three platform tracks and is classified by Deutsche Bahn (DB) as a category 4 station.

It is the first station in Bavaria north of the Austria-Germany border on the Garmisch-Partenkirchen–Innsbruck line (Mittenwald Railway). The station was opened in 1912 and is served by trains operated by both Deutsche Bahn and Austrian Federal Railways (ÖBB).

The station is 18 kilometres from Garmisch-Partenkirchen station and 38 kilometres from Innsbruck West station (de).

== Description ==
The station lies to the east of the town centre, with which it is connected by Bahnhofstraße. The station building was modernised and renovated in 2012, in time for the celebrations of Mittenwald Railway's 100th anniversary. The building contains a ticket office, a public toilet, a small shop with a café, and also a pharmacy.

The station has four tracks, three of which are adjacent to passenger platforms. Platform 1 adjoins the station building, while platforms 2 and 3 are on an island accessible via lift and stairways.

Several local bus services, including routes from Seefeld in Tirol across the border, stop at the station.

A car parking, a bicycle parking facility and a taxi rank are outside the station on Bahnhofplatz.

The bottom station of Karwendelbahn, a cable car connecting Mittenwald with Westliche Karwendelspitze mountain, is a 10-minute walk to the east of the station.

== Rail services ==
As of January 2018, the typical off-peak services from the station are:

- 1 tph (train per hour) to Munich via Garmisch-Partenkirchen. Most of these services originate in Mittenwald, but some are through trains from Seefeld in Tirol or Innsbruck in Austria. Several trains originating in Austria and operated by ÖBB terminate at Garmisch-Partenkirchen;
- 1 tph to Seefeld in Tirol, some of them continuing to Innsbruck.

Overall, there are four trains a day in each direction following the entire Munich–Innsbruck route. All the others are either DB services between Munich and Mittenwald or Seefeld, or ÖBB services between Innsbruck and Garmisch-Partenkirchen.

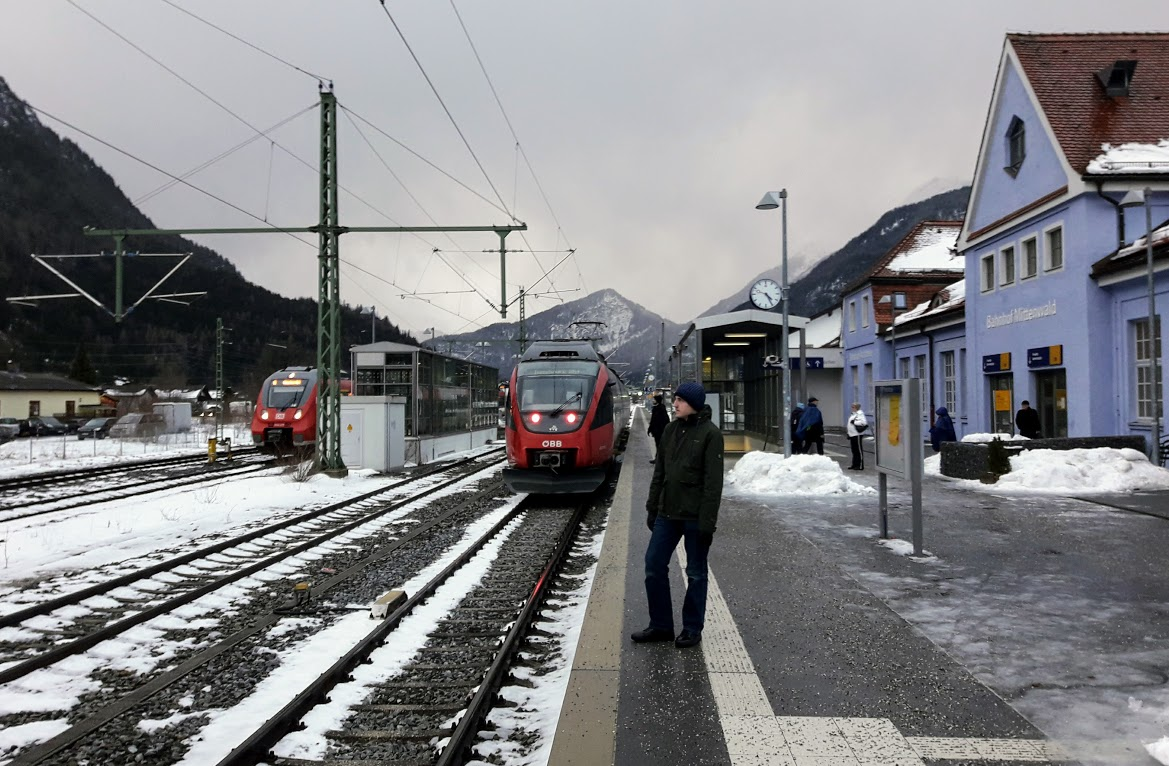
Mittenwald station, looking south (towards Austria). An ÖBB train to Innsbruck at platform 1 on the right, and a DB train to Munich at platform 3 on the left
