= Walchensee =

Lake in Kochel, Bavaria, Germany

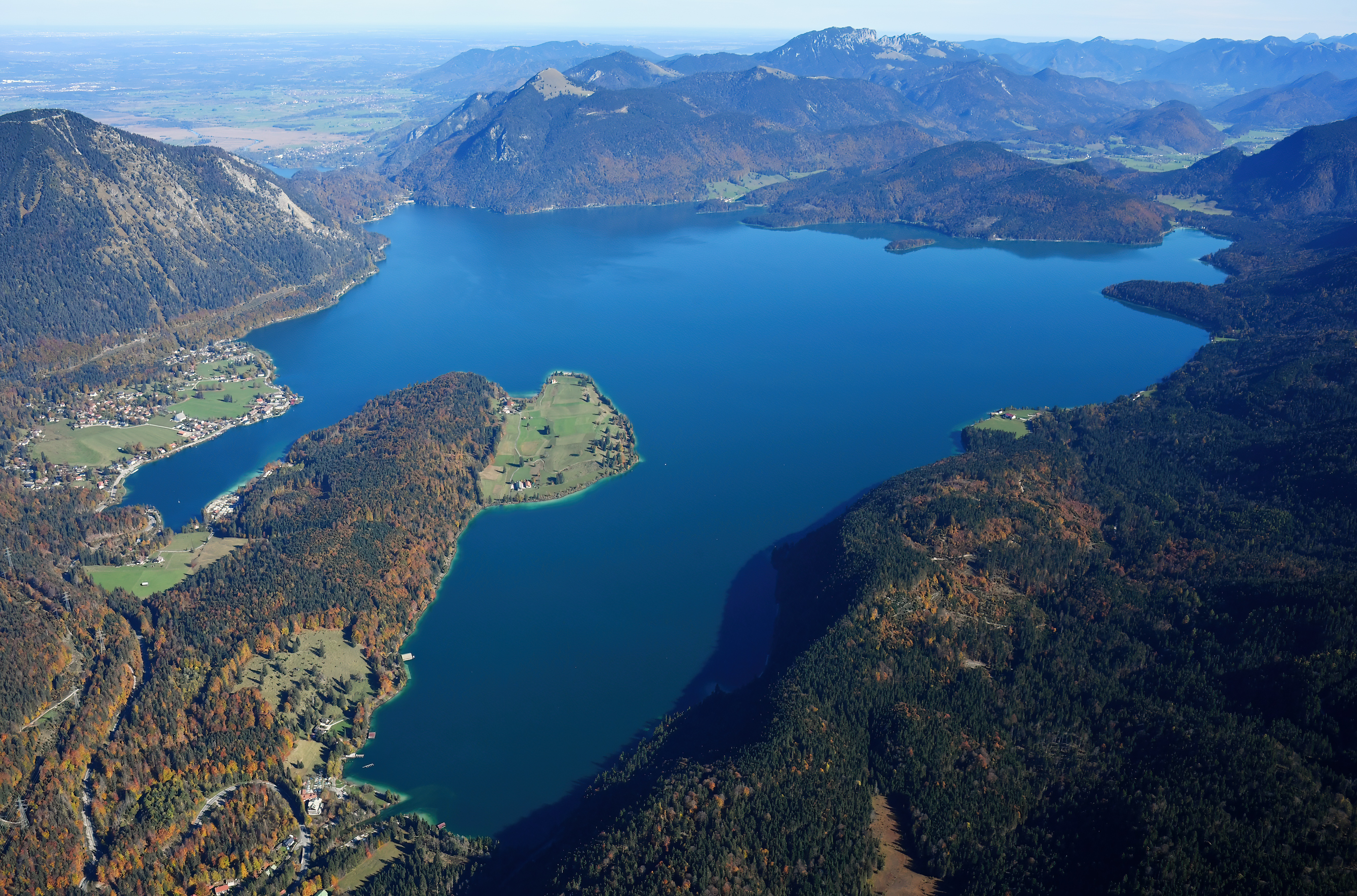

- Location within Bavaria
- Location: Kochel, Bavaria
- Coordinates: 47°35′38″N 11°20′46″E
- Primary inflows: Obernach
- Primary outflows: Jachen; Lake Walchen Power Plant
- Catchment area: 779.3 km^{2} (300.9 sq mi)
- Basin countries: Germany
- Max. length: 6.7 km (4.2 mi)
- Max. width: 5 km (3.1 mi)
- Surface area: 16.4 km^{2} (6.3 sq mi)
- Average depth: 81.4 m (267 ft)
- Max. depth: 192.3 m (631 ft)
- Water volume: 1,324×10^{6} m^{3} (46.8×10^{9} cu ft)
- Surface elevation: 800.8 m (2,627 ft)
- Islands: Sassau
- Settlements: Kochel

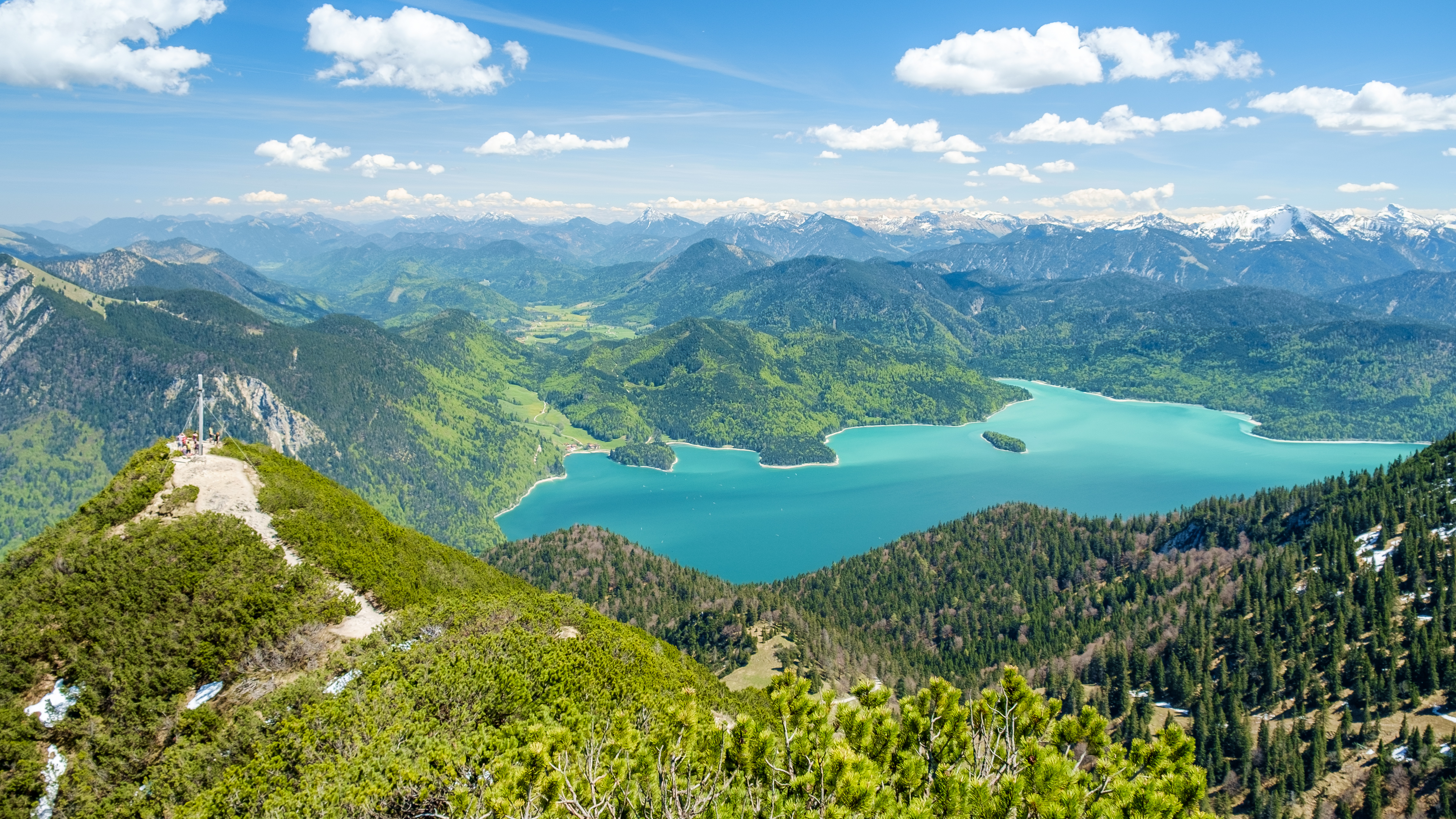
Walchensee viewed from Herzogstand

Walchensee or Lake Walchen is one of the deepest and largest alpine lakes in Germany, with a maximum depth of 192.3 metres (631 ft) and an area of 16.4 square kilometres (6.3 sq mi). The lake is 75 kilometres (47 mi) south of Munich in the middle of the Bavarian Alps. The entire lake, including the island of Sassau, is within the municipality of Kochel. The lake and island are owned by the Bavarian State. To the east and the south, the lake borders the municipality of Jachenau.

== Etymology ==
The name Walchen comes from Middle High German and means "strangers". All Roman and romanized peoples of the Alps south of Bavaria were known to the locals as Welsche or even Walche. This is also true of the etymology of the Swiss Lake Walen and the Salzburg Wallersee.

Another possible interpretation is that it comes from the Latin Lacus vallensis, meaning "lake in a valley". On 16th-century maps, the lake is also labelled dicto Italico, meaning "leading to Italy", probably because the route through the Walchensee valley led through Mittenwald and Innsbruck to Italy.

== Geography ==
=== Genesis ===
Walchensee fills a tectonic valley, part of the Bayerisches Synklinorium (Bavarian Syncline) and from rocks of the Triassic period (the main dolomite, Plattenkalke, and Kössener layers). The extreme depth of the lake, 192.3 metres (631 ft), is the result of this tectonic formation. The rock faces of the northwestern shore clearly show the steep arrangement of the rock layers. The creation of the lake from the forces of mountain building indicate that Walchensee could be one of the oldest lakes in Germany. During the ice age, the Isar–Loisach glacier repeatedly left its mark on the morphology of the area and thereby the Walchensee.

=== Location and surrounding communities ===
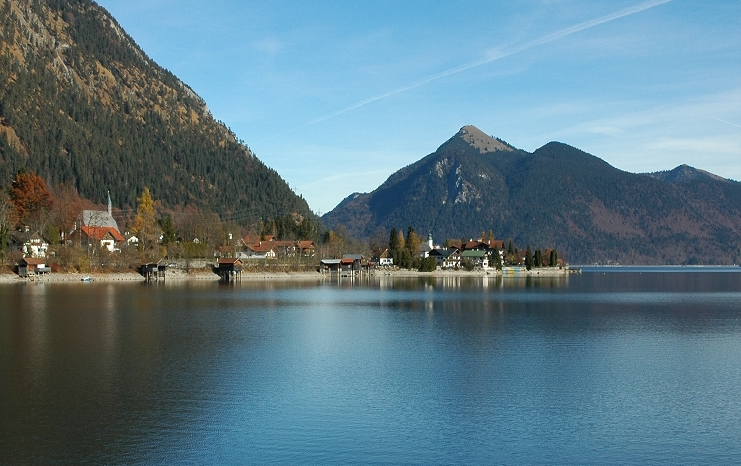
The village of Walchensee

The lake has a shoreline of approximately 27 kilometres (17 mi) and contains 1.3 cubic kilometres (0.31 cu mi) of water. The Jachen is the natural outflow of the lake, eastwards through the valley of Jachenau to the Isar. Obernach is the largest natural inflow to the lake, entering from the southwest. Together with the artificial inflow (see "Peculiarities"), the lake has a catchment basin of 780 square kilometres (300 sq mi).

Walchensee lies at 802 metres (2,631 ft) above sea level. It is surrounded by wooded mountains. To the northwest stands the Herzogstand–Heimgarten group at 1,731 metres (5,679 ft) and 1,790 metres (5,870 ft) respectively and to the west is the valley of the Eschenlaine. The south side of the Eschenlaine valley is the Simetsberg (1,836 metres/6,024 ft), which is the end of the Ester Mountains. To the south of the lake, the Altlacher Hochkopf separates Walchensee from the valley of the Isar. On the eastern shore lies the Jachenau, a long alpine valley that stretches in the direction of Lenggries. The northeast is dominated by the Benediktenwand. A little further to the west is Jochberg (1,565 metres/5,135 ft), which completes the valley wall. Between Herzogstand and Jochberg is little Kesselberg, which because of its relatively low prominence appears as a depression between the two higher peaks, but actually separates Walchensee from Kochelsee, 200 metres (660 ft) below.

Directly on the west bank of the lake is the tiny Luftkurort settlement of Walchensee, with only about 600 inhabitants. Walchensee belongs to the municipality of Kochel as do the yet smaller settlements of Urfeld at the northern tip of the lake, Zwergen on the western shore, and the houses of Einsiedl am Walchensee on the orographic left bank of the Obernach at the far southwestern end of the lake. The houses of Einsiedl am Walchensee on the right bank of the Obernach and Altlach on the southern shore, the farmsteads of Matheis, Christopher, and Breitort, Sachenbach on the east shore, and Niedernach in the far southwest, belong to the municipality of Jachenau. Between the settlements of Walchensee and Einsiedl, the 1.4-square-kilometre (0.54 sq mi) Katzenkopf peninsula reaches 2 kilometres (1.2 mi) into the lake. The settlement of Zwergen lies on this peninsula.

The surface of the lake forms a north-facing triangle, with the southern shore forming a 6.9-kilometre (4.3 mi) base from Einsiedl to Niedernach and the height reaching 5 kilometres (3.1 mi) from Breitort to Urfeld.

=== Climate ===
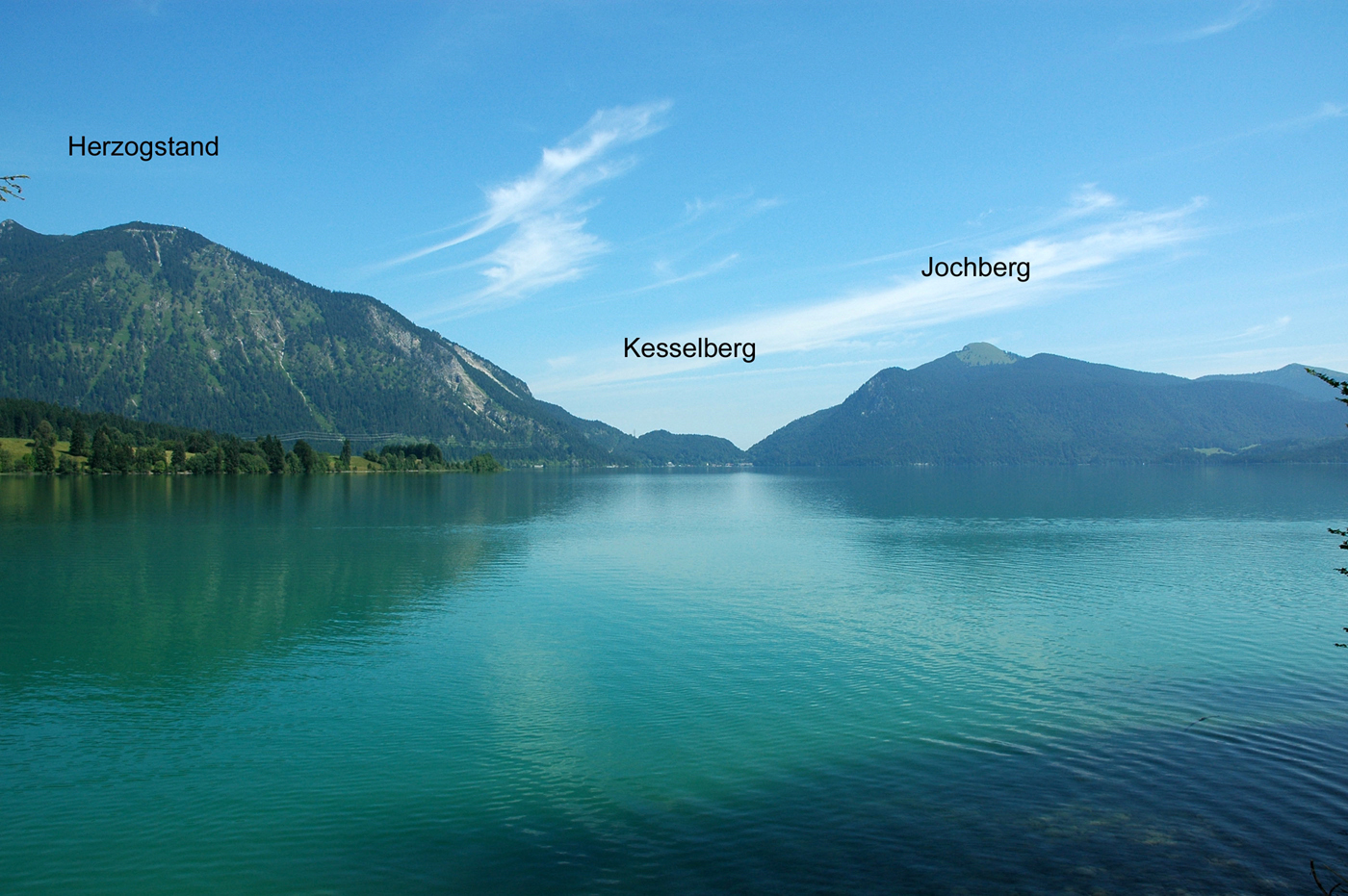
Kesselberg seen in the depression between Herzogstand and Jochberg

Due to its location in a valley, the lake is protected from northern and eastern winds. The relatively low mountains on the south shore let in the optimal amount of sunlight, giving Walchensee a milder climate than one might expect in the mountains. During the summer months, heat on southern side of Herzogstand and Jochberg create strong thermals on sunny days. Stable thermal winds blow generally southwest. When the thermals carry saturated air masses from the Walchensee high into the air and mix with air from the more northerly Kochelsee by a prevailing wind from the northwest, it can lead to particularly violent thunderstorms.

In contrast to a foehn, when a katabatic wind blows from south to north, the associated dry air ensures excellent visibility.

== History ==
Since prehistoric times the local population has felt a close association with the lake; for example until the 18th century it was customary to throw consecrated gold coins into the deepest part of the lake.

The wealth of fish in the lake led the monasteries of Benediktbeuern Abbey and Schlehdorf Abbey to claim Walchensee by 740 AD. The monasteries owned the lake until secularization in 1803. The abbey at Benediktbeuern had more rights than Schlehdorf. Today the free state of Bavaria owns Walchensee.

In Munich around 1900, the idea of using the 200-metre (660 ft) drop between Walchensee and Kochelsee to generate power was born. Dives to survey the lake bottom were already under way by 1903. The driving force behind this venture was Oskar von Miller, who founded the Deutsches Museum in 1903. The approval process dragged on until 1918. Construction work began immediately after World War I. On 24 January 1924 water from Walchensee turned the turbines at the Walchensee Hydroelectric Power Station on the shore of the Kochelsee for the first time.

During World War II at least two aircraft ditched and sank into the lake. On 3 October 1943, an Avro Lancaster from the Royal Air Force crashed here. In April 1945 the Wehrmacht and officials of the Reichsbank approved a plan to store at least part of the reserves of the German Reichsbank at Einsiedl, a small hamlet on the south-west shore. Subsequently, the assets were buried in an undisclosed location in the crags above the Obernach power-plant. The assets consisted of 365 sacks, each with two gold bars, nine envelopes with gold documents, four crates of gold, two bags of gold coins, six boxes of Danish coins, and 94 sacks of foreign currency. The foreign currency was mainly U.S. dollars and Swiss francs. On 6 June 1945, the treasure was handed over to the Allies. One hundred gold bars and all the U.S. dollars and Swiss francs were missing. Possibly there are other hoards, where valuables such as other currencies or gemstones were hidden. Even today, speculation continues about the existence and exact location of such caches.

Since the 1950s, Walchensee has become a popular destination for day trips from Munich and other upper Bavarian cities as well as for tourists. The local population now lives primarily from tourism.

== Biology ==
=== Ecology ===
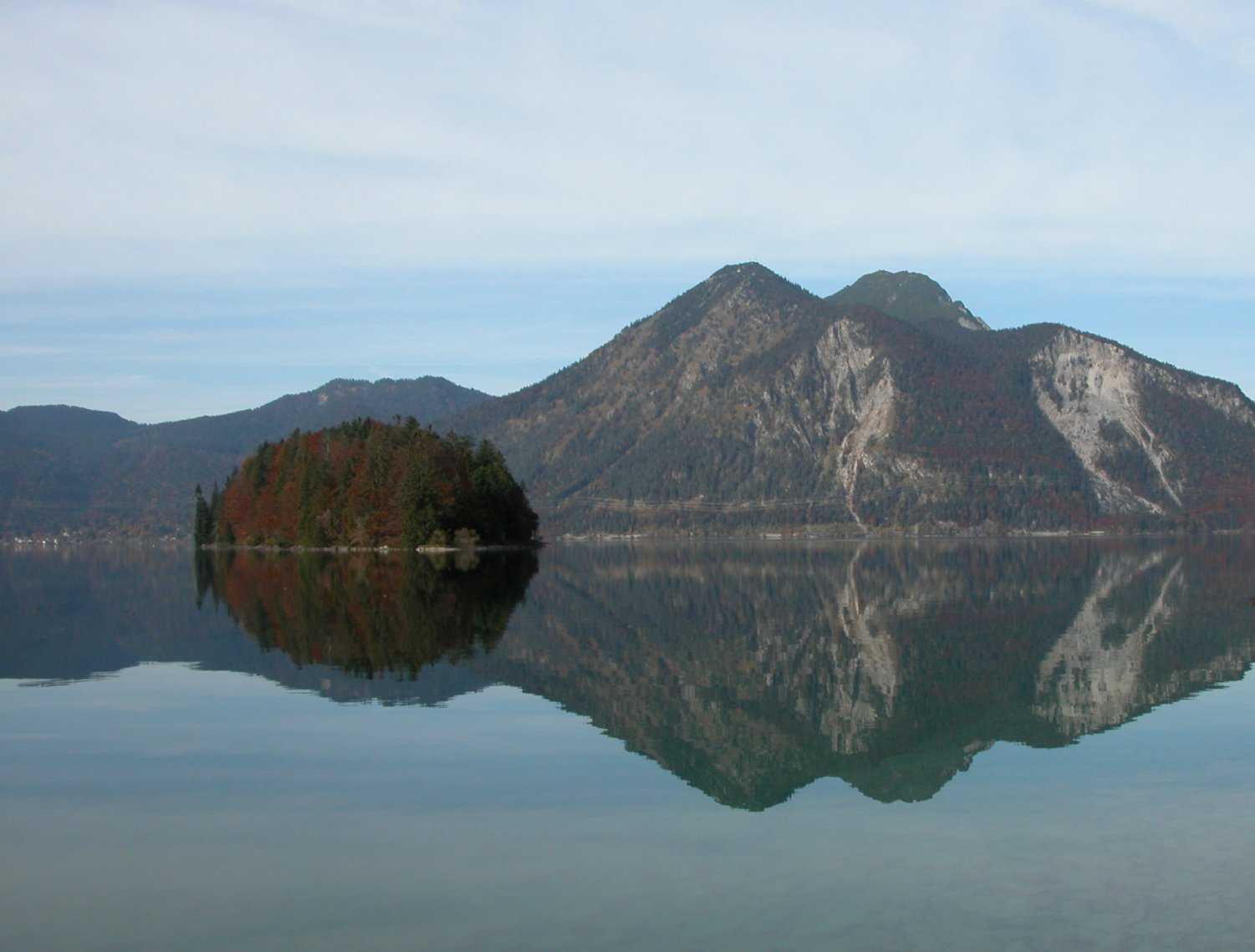
The island of Sassau

The clear waters with an average visibility of 8–10 m owes its turquoise-green color to the relatively high proportion of calcium carbonate. The waters of Walchensee rate as water quality class 1 under the saprobic system. The temperature of the water is relatively low, which is typical for a mountain lake. In summer the water temperature ranges from 17 °C (63 °F) to 20 °C (68 °F) and from 10 °C (50 °F) to 16 °C (61 °F) in the spring and fall. The nutrient load on the originally oligotrophic Walchensee has declined since the mid-1980s, due to improvements in sanitation in Mittenwald.

The Walchensee including its shores is a Landschaftsschutzgebiet landscape protection area. Of the 7-kilometre (4.3 mi) south shore, 2.5 kilometres (1.6 mi) are set aside for recreational purposes, such as bathing. The rest of the shore drops steeply for the most part. The western lakeshore is undeveloped, with a few exceptions.

The island of Sassau (2.9 hectares/7.2 acres) is a nature reserve and is off limits all year round. The island is 367 metres (1,204 ft) long and 93 metres (305 ft) wide in the west. In the east it is only half as wide. Its highest point is 12 metres (39 ft) above the surface of the lake.

=== Flora and fauna ===
The first fish were introduced into the lake more than 500 years ago: whitefish Coregonus sp. were introduced from Kochelsee in 1480, followed by char from Tegernsee. The lake environment can be divided into three zones: shore, bottom, and open water. The following table lists the fish that can be found in these zones.

Shore	Bottom	Open Water
Asp; Carp bream Common bleak Common carp Common dace Common minnow Common roach Common rudd Esox; European chub European eel Ide; Silver bream Tench; Wels catfish Zarte	Barbus barbus Burbot; Chondrostoma nasus Cobitidae; Common whitefish Coregonus acronius Crucian carp European bullhead Percidae; Ruffe; Rutilus meidingerii	Brown trout Mairenke (either Alburnus mento or Chalcalburnus chalcoides); Oncorhynchus mykiss Renke; Salvelinus alpinus alpinus Zander

More than 50% of the fish species that live here are threatened or at least endangered in Bavaria, including the wels catfish and Rutilus meidingerii. The swan mussel is also on the IUCN Red List of endangered plant and animals.

In 2003, Upper Bavaria began a project to restock Walchensee with European crayfish Astacus astacus. For this purpose, 1900 crayfish were captured in Eibsee, west of Garmish-Partenkirchen.

The lake and Sassau island offer excellent breeding opportunities for many bird species and a safe winter quarters or resting place for migrating birds. In addition to red-necked and black-necked grebes, mallards, and Eurasian coots, common mergansers and great northern divers are sometimes seen.

Ranunculus fluitans and Myriophyllum spicatum grow just below the surface near the shore and in the lake's inlets. Unicellular organisms both vegetable (diatoms and green algae) and animal (water fleas, genus Cyclops ) occur in virtually all areas of the lake. Native Phragmites and Schoenoplectus grow near the shore and waterlilies Nymphaea alba and Nuphar lutea offer shelter for grass snakes and other animals.

== Tourism ==
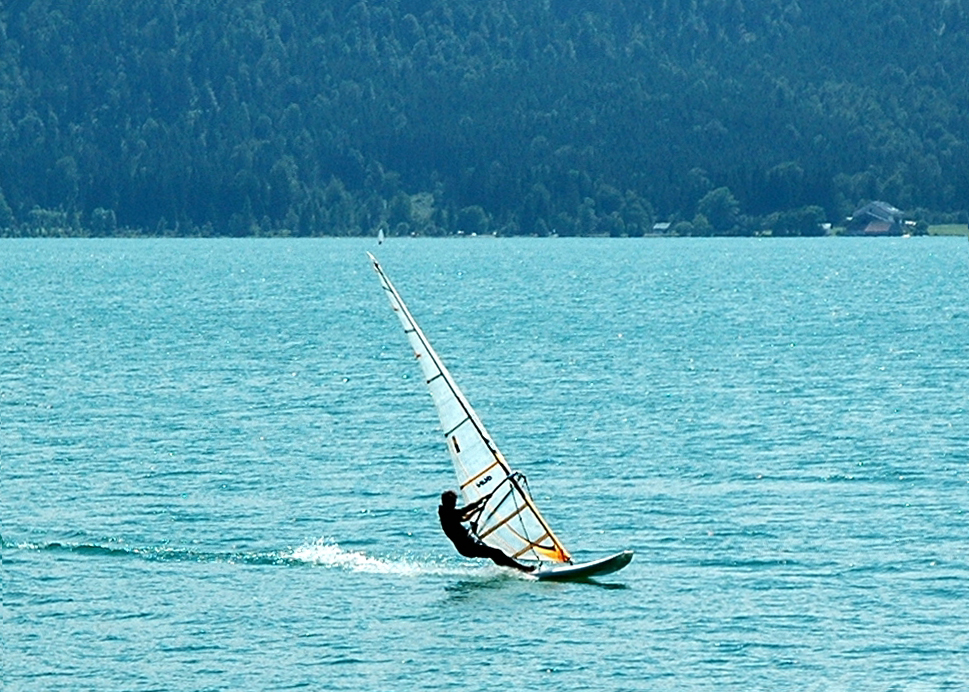
A windsurfer near the western shore

Like other large lakes, such as Tegernsee, Walchensee plays a major role is tourism for the region. Enthusiasts of windsurfing and sailing take advantage of the continuous thermal winds of the summer months. Creation of thermals is encouraged by winds from the East or North and by the relatively large day and night temperatures. The clear waters with visibility of up to 40 metres (130 ft) and a whole series of car, boat, and even aircraft wrecks make the lake particularly interesting for scuba divers. In addition to the usual activities, such as swimming and hiking, those seeking recreation in the winter months can hike and cross country ski in the surrounding mountains.

The Herzogstandbahn, a gondola lift, runs from Spring to Fall from Walchensee up the Fahrenberg. From there one can walk past the Herzogstandhaus to the top of the Herzogstand in 30–45 minutes.

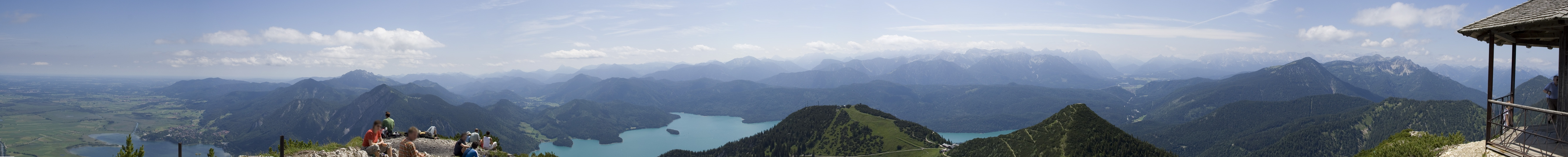
Panorama from Herzogstand

== Fishing ==
The lake is owned by the Bavarian State and is managed by the Genossenschaft oberbayerischer Berufsfischer & Teichwirte. Fishing permits are available.

== Points of interest ==
=== Walchensee Power Station ===
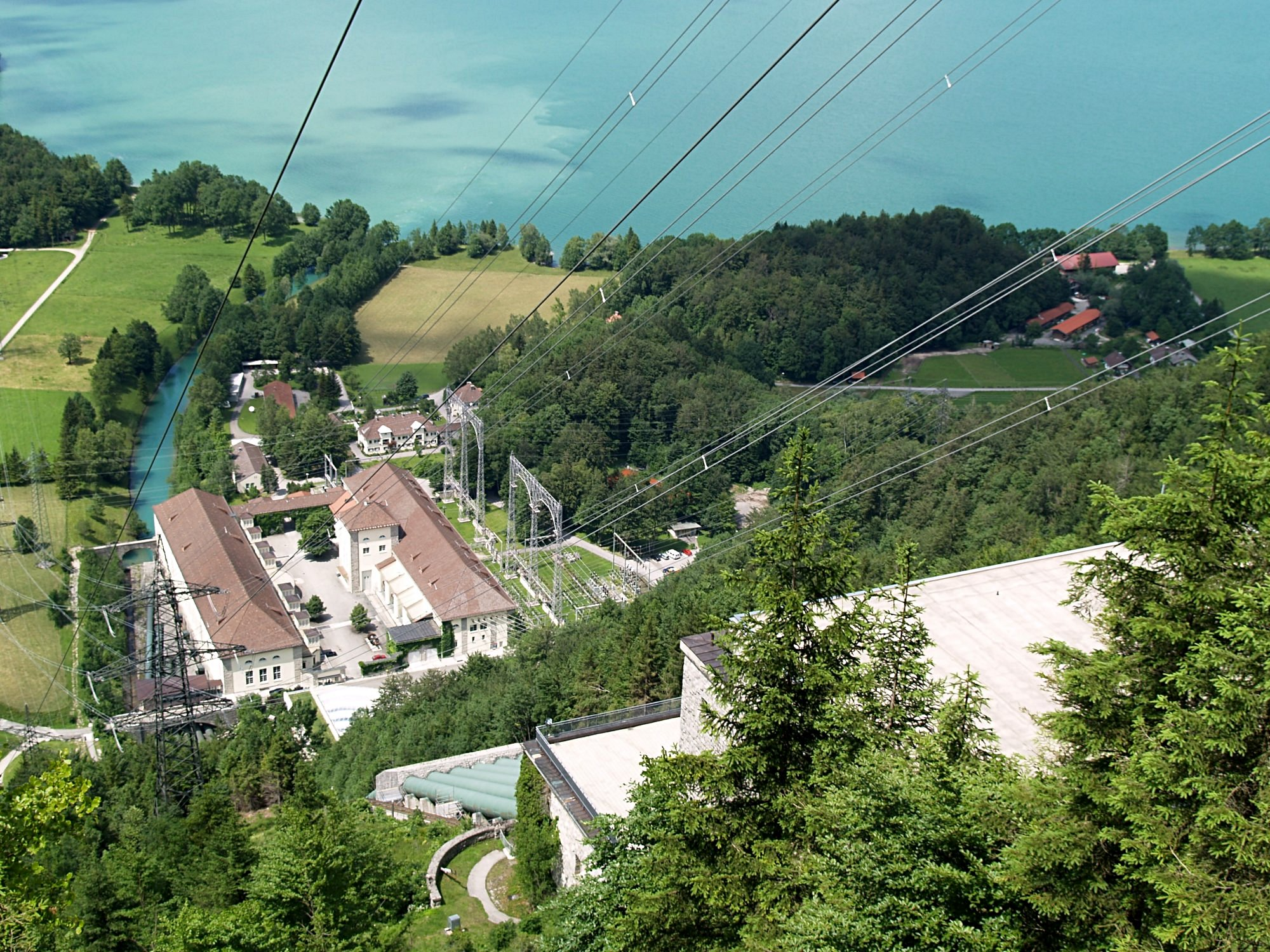
Lake Walchen Power Plant with water palace and Kochelsee

In 1924, Bayernwerk AG put the Lake Walchen Power Plant into operation on the south shore of Kochelsee. Six pipes carry water from Walchensee 200 m down the mountain to the hydroelectric plant. In order to increase the amount of water available for the plant, a 7-km long tunnel was driven in the Karwendel to tap the Rißbach and Isar rivers, feeding Walchensee. Overall, Walchensee has an average volume of 1.3 billion cubic meters. Two smaller hydroelectric plants were built directly on Walchensee: one at the mouth of the Niedernach in the southeast and one on the Obernach in the southwest.

Large amounts of water are only taken from lake during winter months so as not to disturb the tourist industry during the peak season. Because of the large fluctuations in water level during the winter, the lake no longer freezes.

- Maximum water level 802 m above sea level
- Nominal water level 801.5 m above sea level
- Minimum water level 795 m above sea level

The ice that does form in the individual bays is very thin and is off limits.

=== Wrecks ===
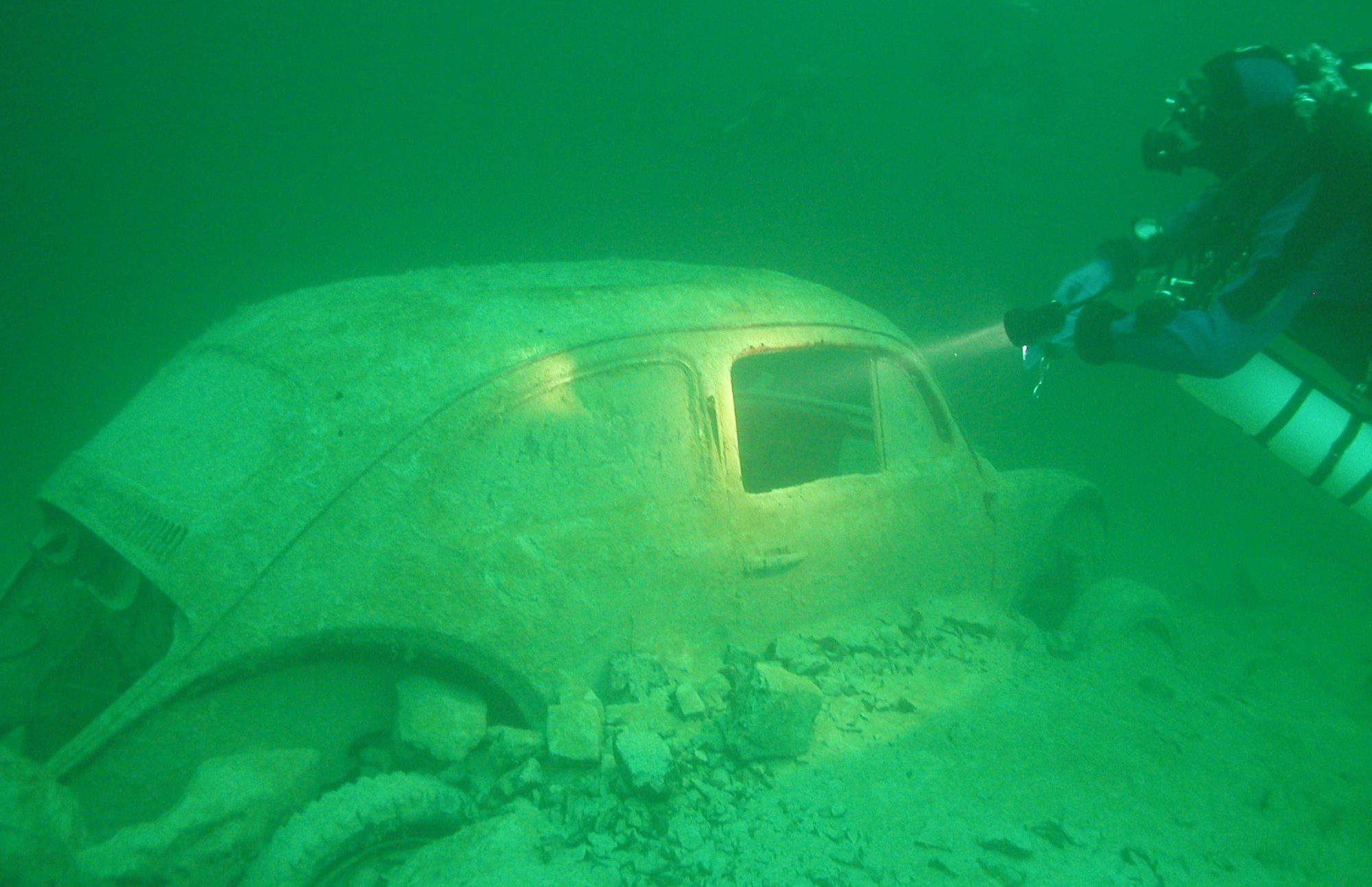
An old VW Bug on the bottom of the lake

On the lakebottom is a series of wrecks, including three aircraft. From World War II there is a Messerschmitt Bf 109 and a British Avro Lancaster bomber. Among the debris the remains of an Aero Commander 680W was found. The high-wing twin-engine plane with the markings D-ID MON crashed into the lake on 27 December 1978 after its tail broke off. The plane crashed in shallow water and was immediately salvaged along with its crew.

The wrecks of two cars near the shore, a Volkswagen Beetle and a Ford, are also popular for divers to explore.

=== Landscape painting ===
In 1934, the painter Lorenzo Quaglio the Younger immortalized Walchensee in an oil painting titled simply Der Walchensee. The painting hangs today in the Munich City Museum.

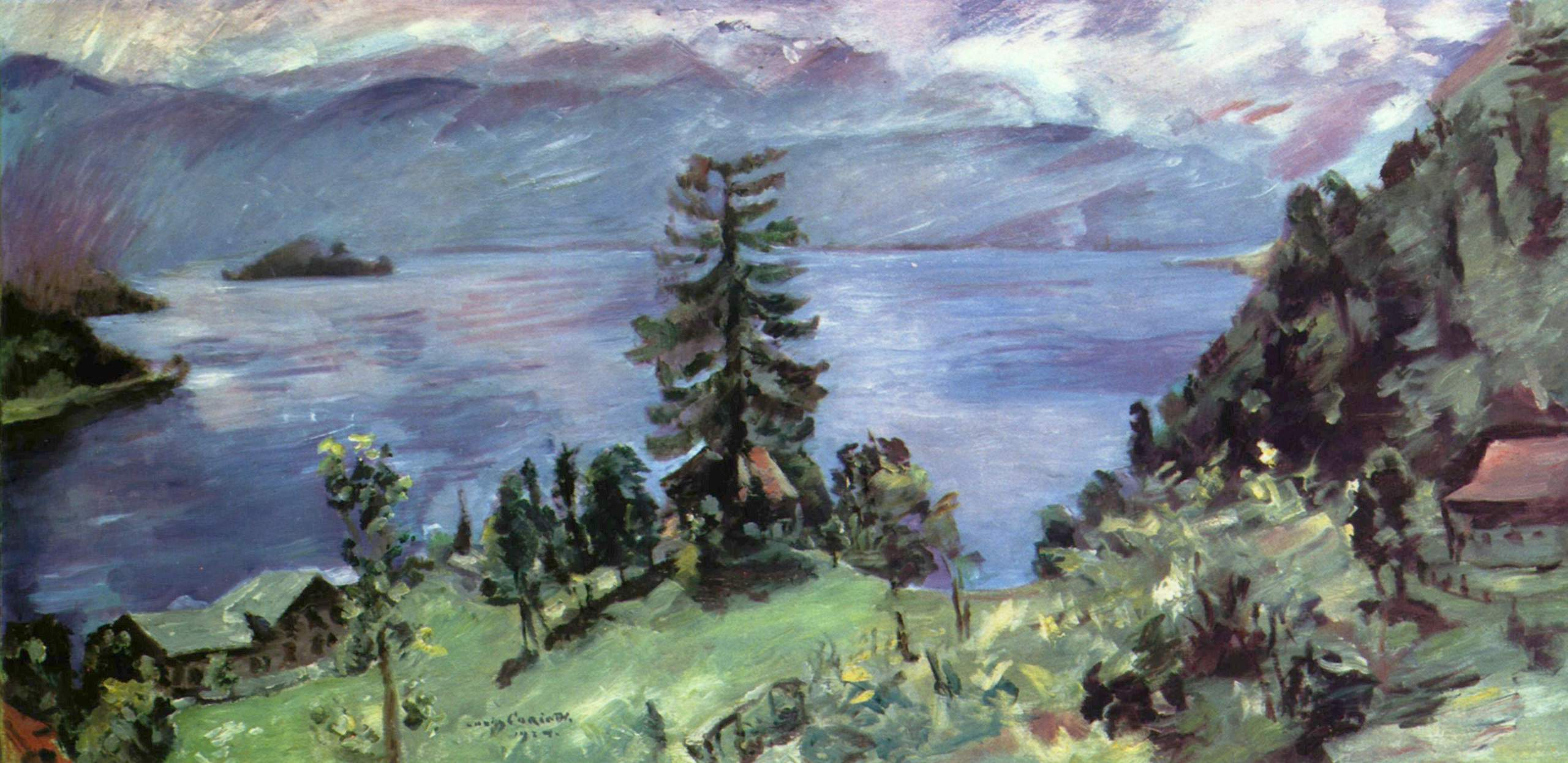
Lovis Corinth: Walchensee Panorama – View from On High (1924)

After World War I, the artist Lovis Corinth bought a house in Urfeld. From 1919 until the end of his life in 1925, the Impressionist spent his summer months along with his wife at the lake. His success as a landscape painter rests on the work he did with Walchensee as a subject. He did more than 60 of these paintings.

== Folklore ==
Because of the lake’s depth, the region’s inhabitants used to believe it was connected to the sea underground. According to legend, a lake monster in the form of a giant catfish, almost as large as the lake itself, lives at the bottom of Lake Walchensee. If godlessness and vice were to spread, it would shatter the mountain on the lake’s shore, causing the entire surrounding area to be flooded, extending even beyond Munich.
