= Jachen =

River in Germany

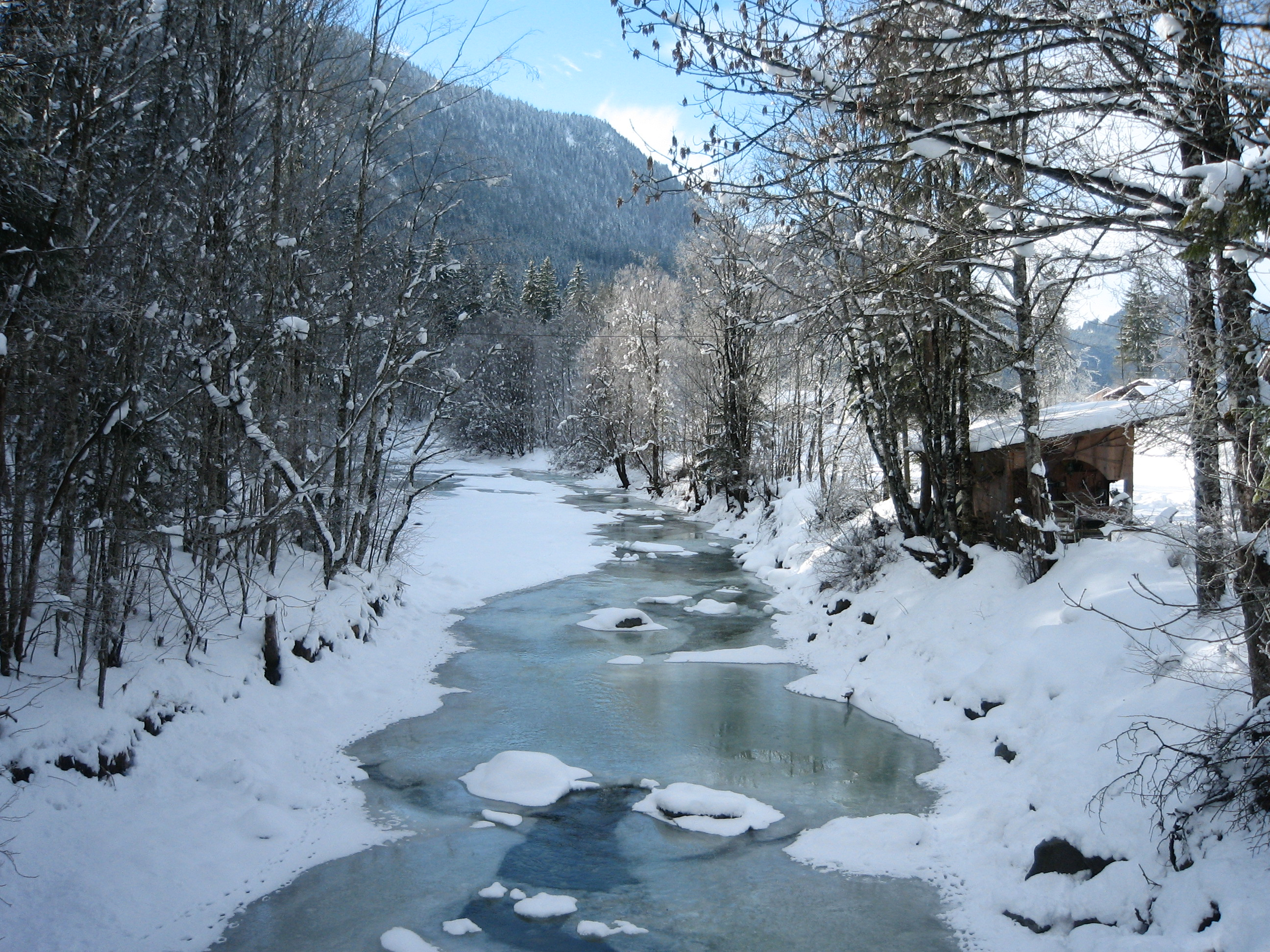
- The Jachen at Point, a part of Jachenau

Location
- Country: Germany
- State: Bavaria

Physical characteristics
- Mouth
  - location: Isar
  - coordinates: 47.6491°N 11.5843°E
- Length: 22.7 km (14.1 mi)

Basin features
- Progression: Isar→ Danube→ Black Sea

The Jachen is a river in Bavaria, Germany. It flows into the Isar south of Lenggries.

== See also ==
- List of rivers of Bavaria
