= Stein (Kochel am See) =

Mountain in Bavaria, Germany

Highest point
- Elevation: 930 m (3,050 ft)
- Coordinates: 47°38′01″N 11°19′31″E

Geography
- Location: Bavaria, Germany

Stein (German pronunciation: [ʃtaɪn]) is a mountain in Bavaria, Germany, located south-east of Kochel am See over Lake Kochel.
