= Benediktenwand =

Mountain ridge in Bavaria, Germany

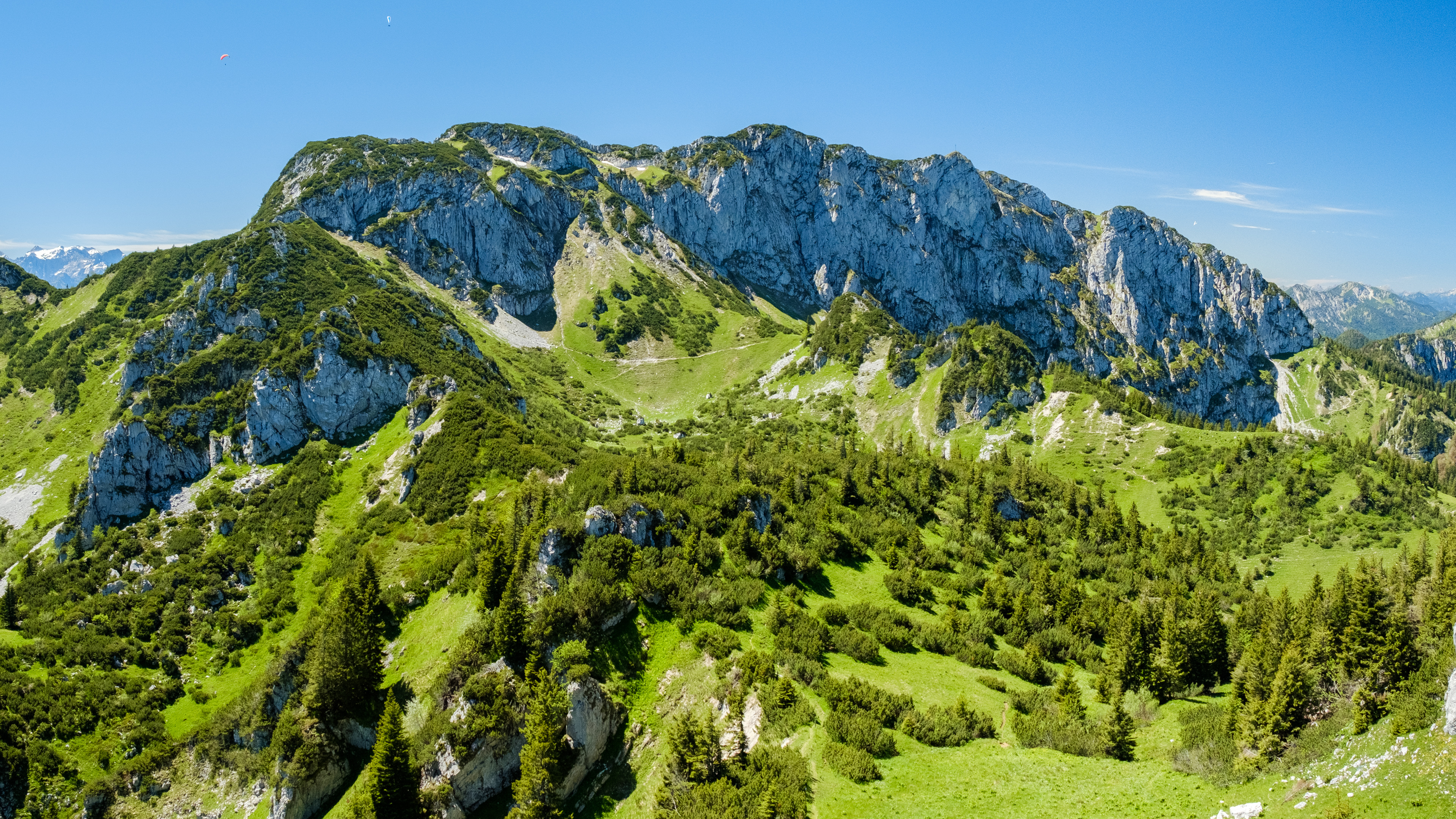
- North face of the Benediktenwand

Highest point
- Elevation: 1,800 m above sea level (NN) (5,900 ft)
- Prominence: 943 m
- Coordinates: 47°39′11″N 11°27′56″E

Geography
- Location within Bavaria
- Location: Bavaria, Germany
- Parent range: Prealps (Bavarian Prealps)

Geology
- Rock age: Triassic
- Mountain type: Wetterstein limestone

Climbing
- Normal route: From Benediktbeuern via the Tutzinger Hut and the western ascent to the summit

The Benediktenwand (formerly the Kirchstein) is a 1,800-metre-high (5,900 ft) mountain ridge in the Bavarian Prealps between the rivers Loisach and Isar and the Jachenau in the south and Benediktbeuern Abbey, from which it derives its name, in the north. Immediately below the North Face of the Benediktenwand is the Tutzinger Hut (1,327 m).

During the Würm glaciation, the summit of the Benediktenwand towered about 600 metres above the ice stream of the Walchensee and Isar Glaciers (branches of the Inn Valley Glacier).

== Peaks ==
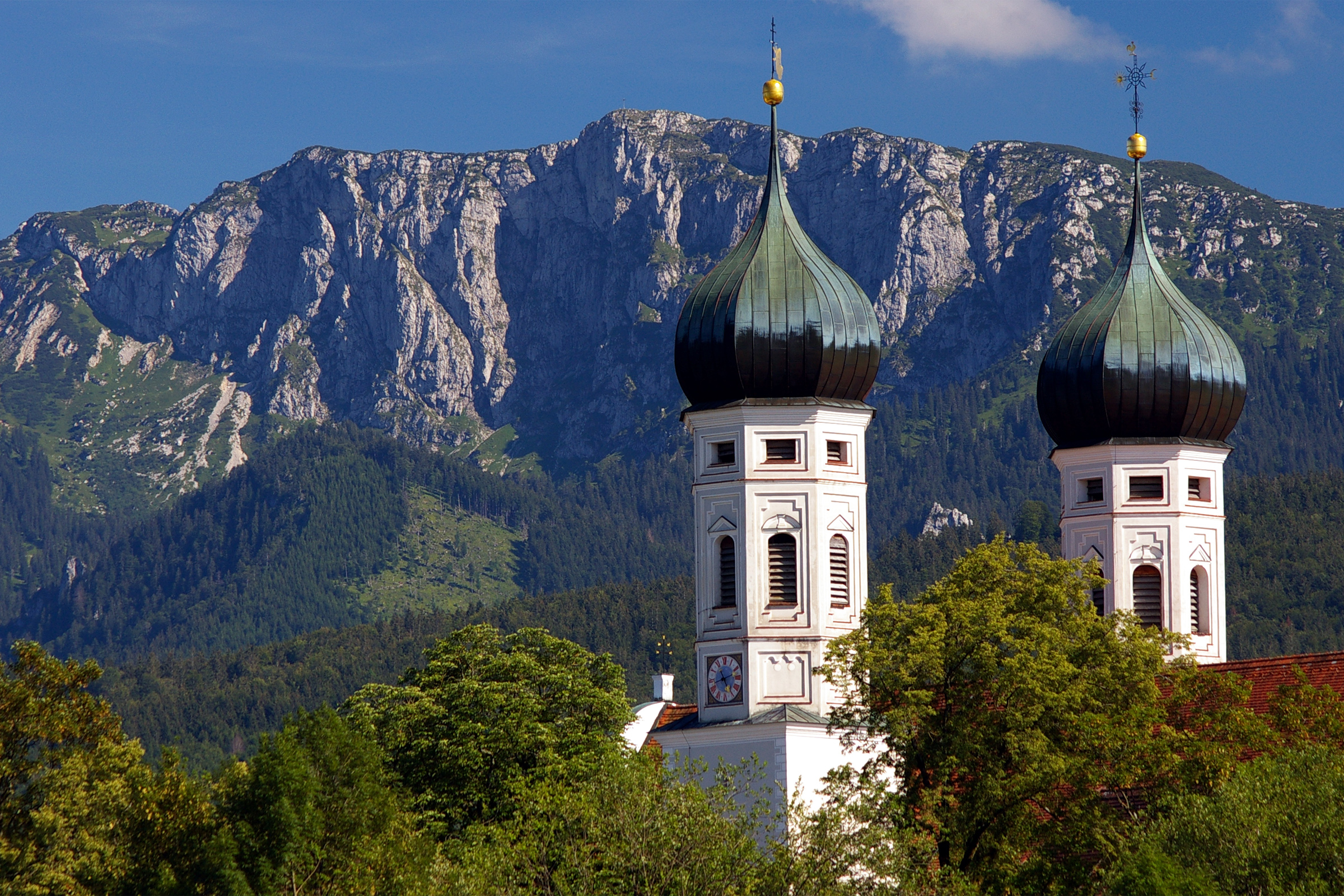
View from Benediktbeuern of the Benediktenwand

The following peaks belong to the Benediktenwand Group, from west to east: Rabenkopf (1,555.5 m), Glaswand (1,496 m), Benediktenwand (1,800 m), Hennenkopf (1,614 m), Probstenwand (1589 m), Achselköpfe (1,600–1,710 m), Latschenkopf (1,712 m), Hinterer Kirchstein (1,667 m), Vorderer Kirchstein (1670 m) and Schrödelstein (1,548 m). To the east the Brauneck (1,555 m) borders on the mountain group. The normal climb to the Benediktenwand runs from Benediktbeuern via the Tutzinger Hut to the top. Climbs also run from the Jachenau via the Glaswandscharte or via the Bichler Alm and the Altweibersteig and from Isarwinkel. Other routes run through the Längental valley vai the Probstalm (1,376 m; Alpine Club hut not open to the public) as well as up the cable car to the Brauneck and then to the Benediktenwand.

== Climbing routes ==
Numerous climbing routes run up the North Face, which is visible from a long way off, to the summit of the Benediktenwand. They range from grades II to VIII. Several climbing routes also ascend the South Face.

== Alpine ibex ==
Since September 1959, Alpine ibex, members of the goat family, have lived on the northern and southern flanks of the Benediktenwand. At that time a big, non-native ibex was seen for the first time by mountain walkers in and reported to the forestry office at Jachenau. Following the introduction of 2 billy goats and two nanny goats from Switzerland in June 1967, a colony of more than 100 animals (1998) was established within 30 years, so that in recent times more and more have had to be made available for hunting. In order to keep sickness and malnourishment at bay, the ibex colony is kept at around 80 animals. The ibex family is one of the four populations of Alpine ibex in Germany. It forms groups and, as a result of the numbers of tourists, show little fear of man. The animals spend the summer mostly on the shaded northern side of the Benediktenwand; winter tends to be spent more on the less snow-bound southern side.

In summer 2004 a bronze tablet was inaugurated on the southern side of the Benediktenwand on the large rocks at the start of the "Old Wives Climb" (Altweibersteiges) above the Bichler Alm. The tablet briefly outlines the history of the ibex colony and mentions their sponsors and supporters, Alfons Goppel, August Moralt, Franz Burda, Matthias Müller from Jachenau and Josef Schmidt from Benediktbeuern. The design of the tablet comes from Josef Oswald, known as ErbhoferSepp, of Jachenau.

== Legends ==
According to a folk story recorded by Johann Nepomuk Sepp, the Benediktenwand rests "on four golden columns, and conceals countless treasures within it." According to the legend, a boy from Wackersberg lost his way and discovered a bubbling golden spring. A similar story is told about the Probstenwand in the local dialect: "Back in the mists of time golden icicles were seen hanging in a crevice in the Probstenwand, and the people came from Munich; they came across glittering stones on the ground."

== Gallery ==
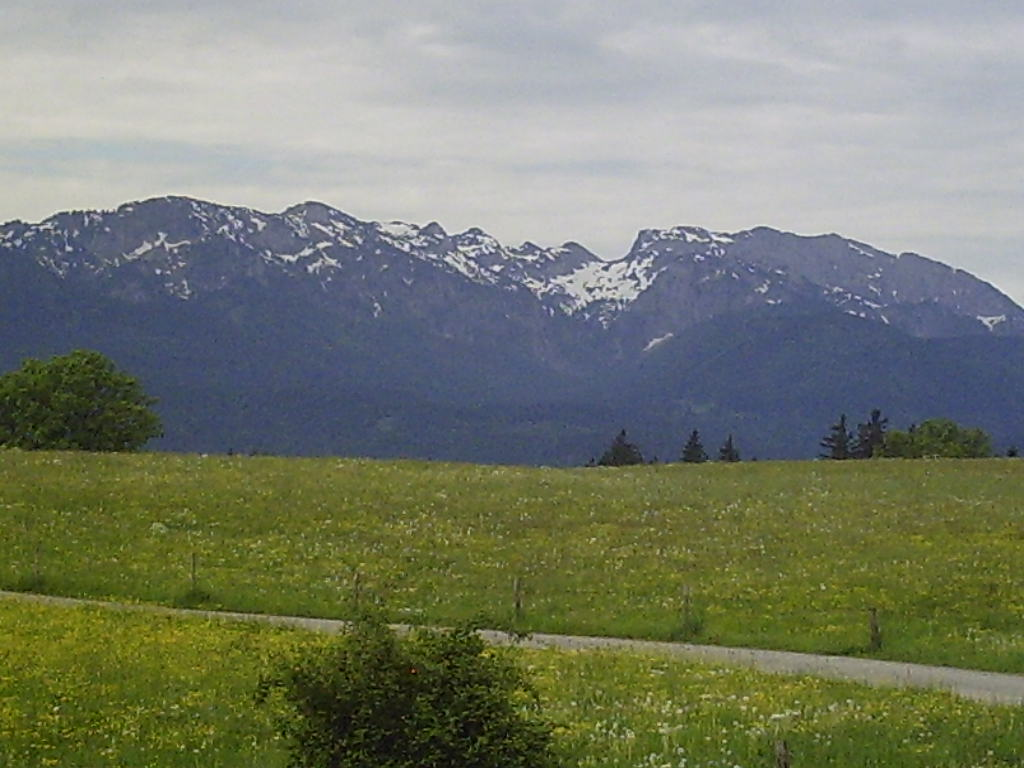
The Benediktenwand seen from Gaißach

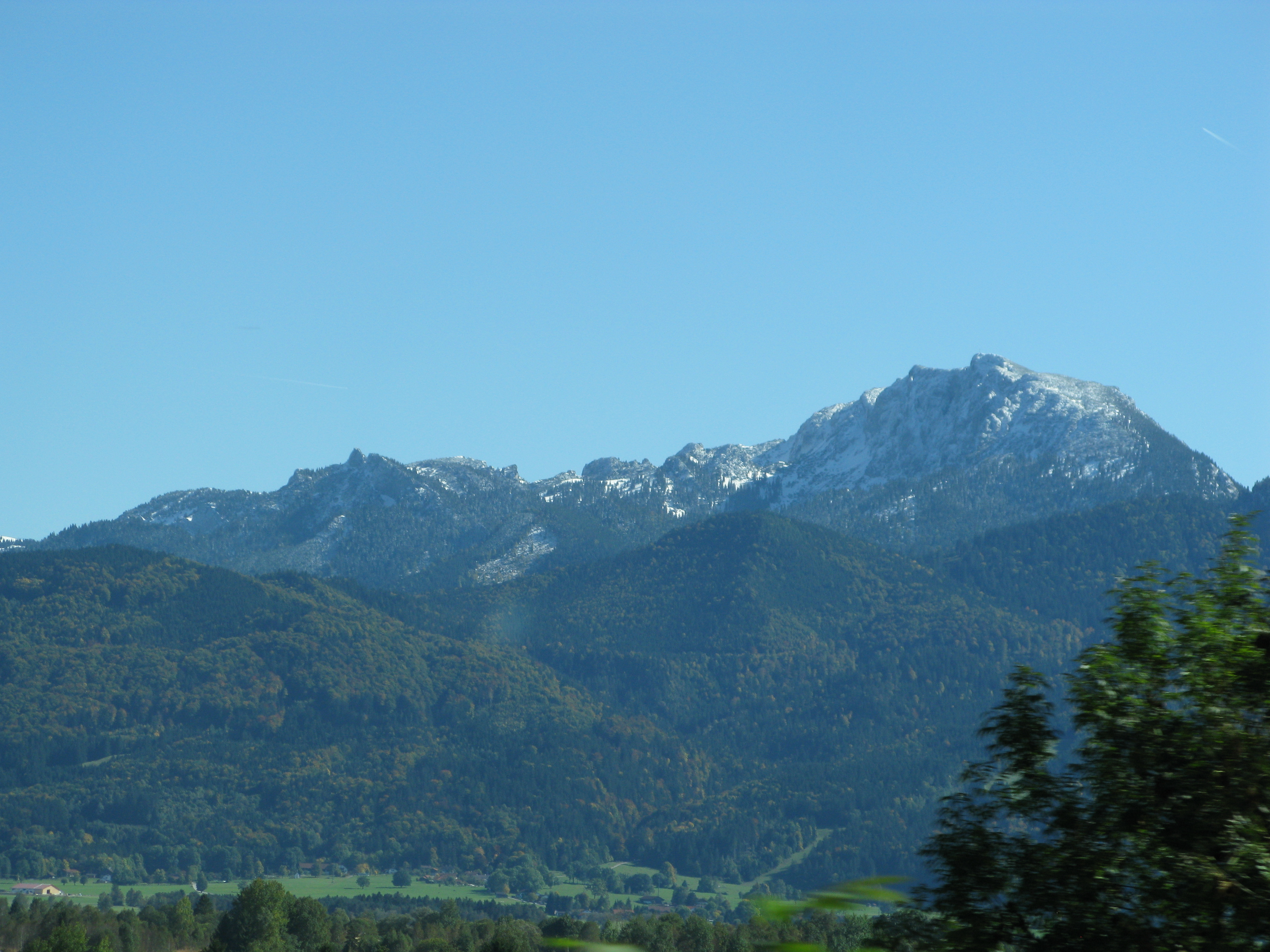
The Benediktenwand seen from the motorway to Garmisch (taken south of Penzberg)

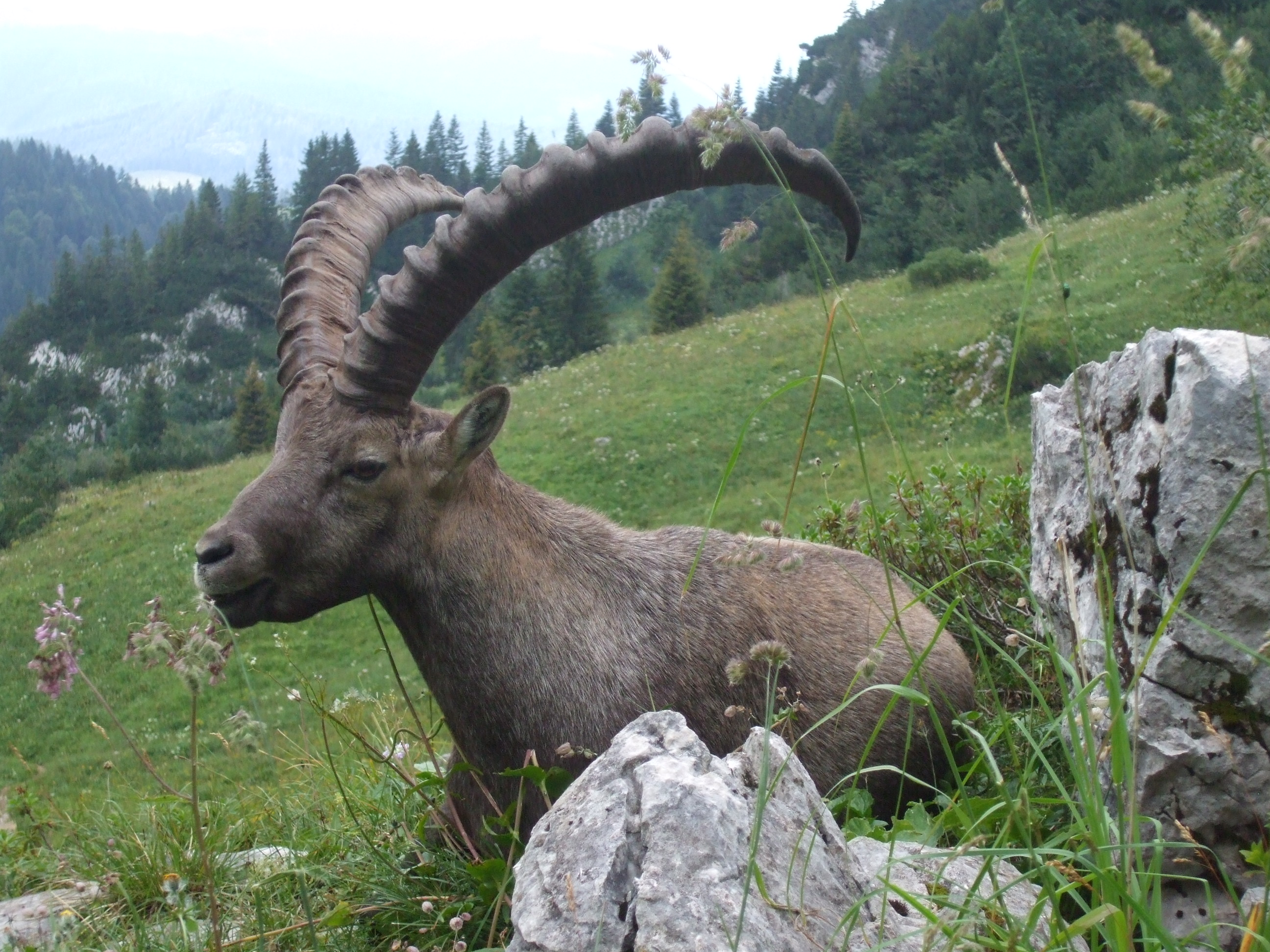
Alpine ibex in the area of the Benediktenwand

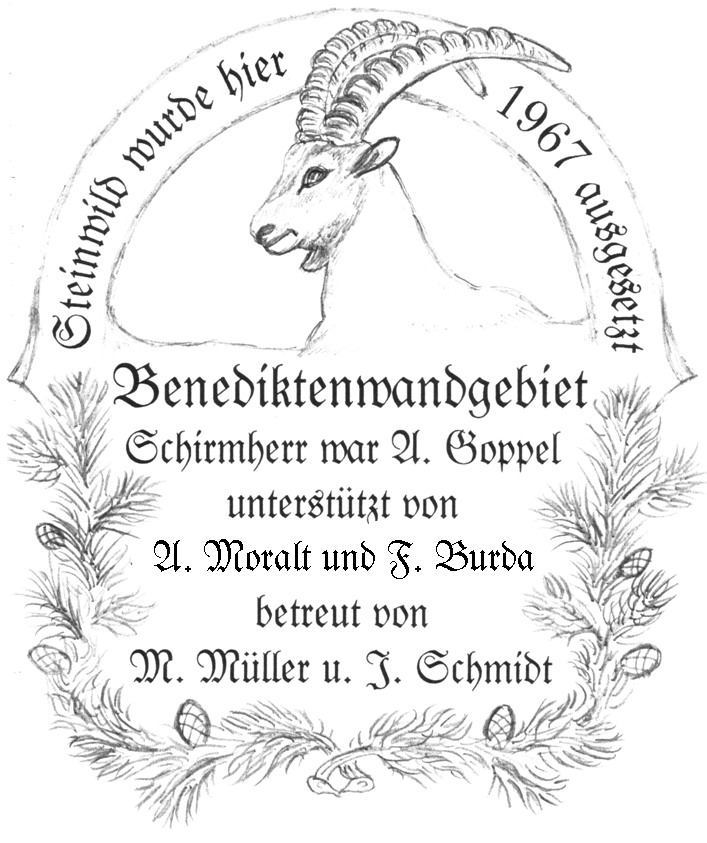
Bronze plate on the history of the ibex family on the Benediktenwand
