= Loisach =

River in Germany

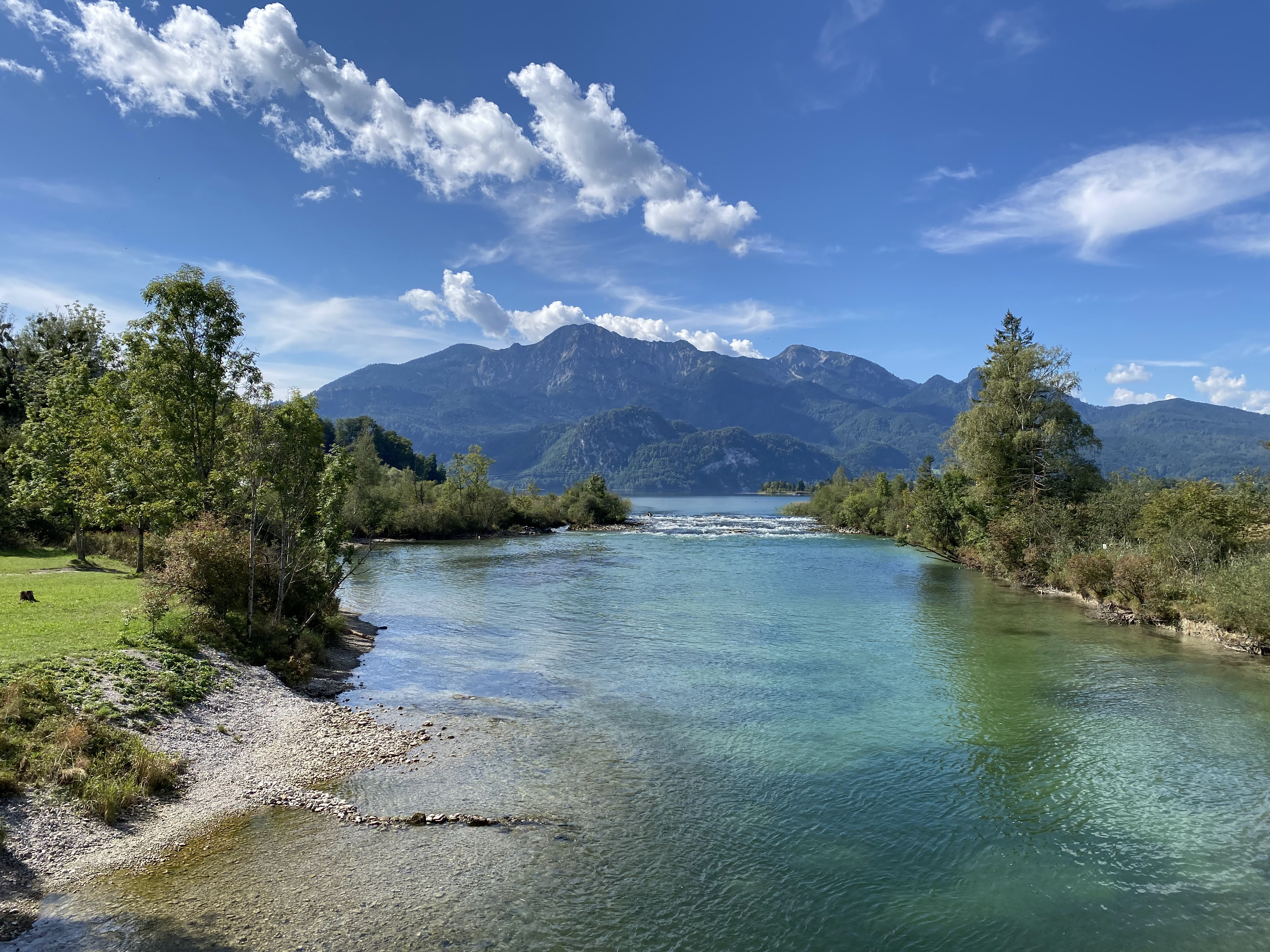
- Loisach leaving the Kochelsee

Location
- Countries: Germany and Austria

Physical characteristics
- Source
  - location: Northern Limestone Alps
- Mouth
  - location: Isar
  - coordinates: 47°56′11″N 11°26′2″E
- Length: 113.2 km (70.3 mi)
- Basin size: 1,090 km^{2} (420 sq mi)

Basin features
- Progression: Isar→ Danube→ Black Sea

The Loisach (German pronunciation: [ˈlɔʏzax]) is a river that flows through Tyrol, Austria and Bavaria, Germany. The Loisach runs through the great moors Murnauer Moos and Loisach-Kochelsee-Moore

The Loisach is a 113-kilometre-long (70 mi) left tributary to the Isar whose source is near Ehrwald in Austria. It flows past Garmisch-Partenkirchen and into the Kochelsee. At this lake, the water that was diverted from the upper river Isar for the Walchensee Hydroelectric Power Station joins the Loisach. The Loisach then flows out of Kochelsee and joins the Isar at Wolfratshausen. A canal joins the Isar and the Loisach returning the water diverted for power generation to the Isar before Wolfratshausen to reduce the risk of flooding in the town.

The most important tributaries of the Loisach entering from the right-hand side are the Hammersbach, the Partnach near Garmisch-Partenkirchen, the streams Kuhflucht near Farchant, Röhrlbach and Lauterbach near Oberau, the Mühlbach near Eschenlohe, as well as the Eschenlaine near Eschenlohe, and the Kaltwasserleine near Ohlstadt and the Lainbach coming from the Benediktenwand. On the left, the Loisach receives a notable tributary at Griesen from the Neidernach, at Oberau from Gießenbach and at Murnau via the Ramsach, which drains the entire Murnauer Moos.
