= Jochberg (mountain) =

Mountain in Bavaria, Germany

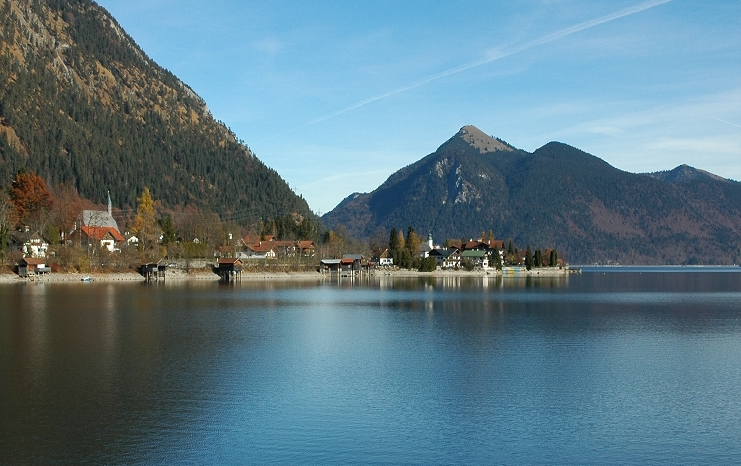
- Jochberg rising behind the Walchensee, i.e. the Lake Walchen

Highest point
- Elevation: 1,567 m (5,141 ft)
- Coordinates: 47°37′33″N 11°22′18″E

Naming
- English translation: Yoke Mountain
- Language of name: German
- Pronunciation: German: [ˈjɔxbɛʁk]

Geography
- Location: Bavaria, Germany
- Parent range: Bavarian Alpenvorland

Climbing
- Easiest route: Hike from Kesselberg

The Jochberg is a mountain, 1,567 metres (5,141 ft) high, in the Bavarian Alpine Foreland, the first range of mountains of the Alps in southern Germany. The mountain stands between two large lakes, namely Kochelsee and Walchensee.

Due to the striking view of the surrounding Bavarian countryside from its summit, Jochberg is a popular day hike for locals as well as for residents of nearby Munich. The trail is considered easy enough to be enjoyable for all ages, thus adding to its popularity. In addition, the peak is frequently used as a launching site for paragliding. The ascent begins from the Kesselberg or alternatively for a somewhat longer hike from Jachenau, Sachenbach am Ostufer, a small village near Walchensee, or Kochel, a town immediately on the shore of Kochelsee. Beneath the summit at 1,382 metres there is a farm active during the summer and popular with the hikers called Jocheralm (meaning roughly "Yoke Pasture of the Mountains"). On a clear day the Munich Olympiaturm is quite visible, despite being over 60 km (37 mi) to the north. Another notable feature is that mountain is also climbed quite frequently in winter and when there is moderate snow accumulation, tracks are left behind from Kesselberg to the summit.

The summit has been closed to paragliders by the landowner since September 10, 2015, because, contrary to agreements made, paragliders also take off towards the south, thus disturbing and endangering grazing livestock on the very steep southern slope.
