= Jochberg =

Jochberg may refer to

- Jochberg, Tyrol, a municipality in Austria
- Jochberg (mountain) in Bavaria, Germany
