= Walchensee Hydroelectric Power Station =

Walchensee power station
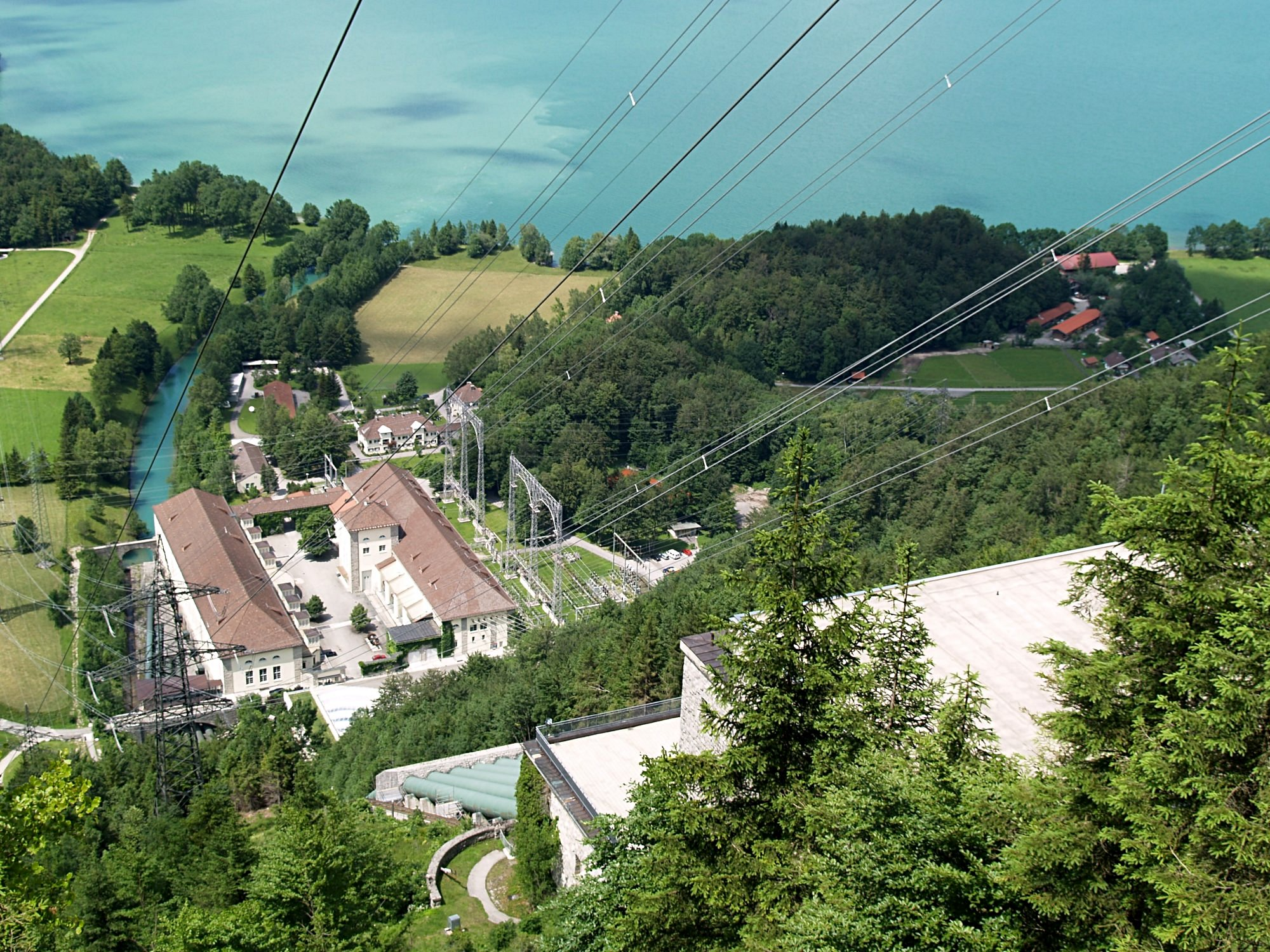
- Country: Germany
- Location: Walchensee, Kochel
- Coordinates: 47°37′48″N 11°20′15″E
- Status: Operational
- Owner(s): Uniper Kraftwerke GmbH

Upper reservoir
- Creates: Walchensee

Lower reservoir
- Creates: Kochelsee

Power Station
- Commission date: 1924
- Hydraulic head: ca. 200 m
- Turbines: 8
- Pump-generators: 0
- Pumps: 0
- Installed capacity: 124 MW
- Capacity factor: 27.6%
- Annual generation: 300 GW·h
- Website www.uniper.energy/de/unser-geschaeft/unsere-standorte/walchensee.html

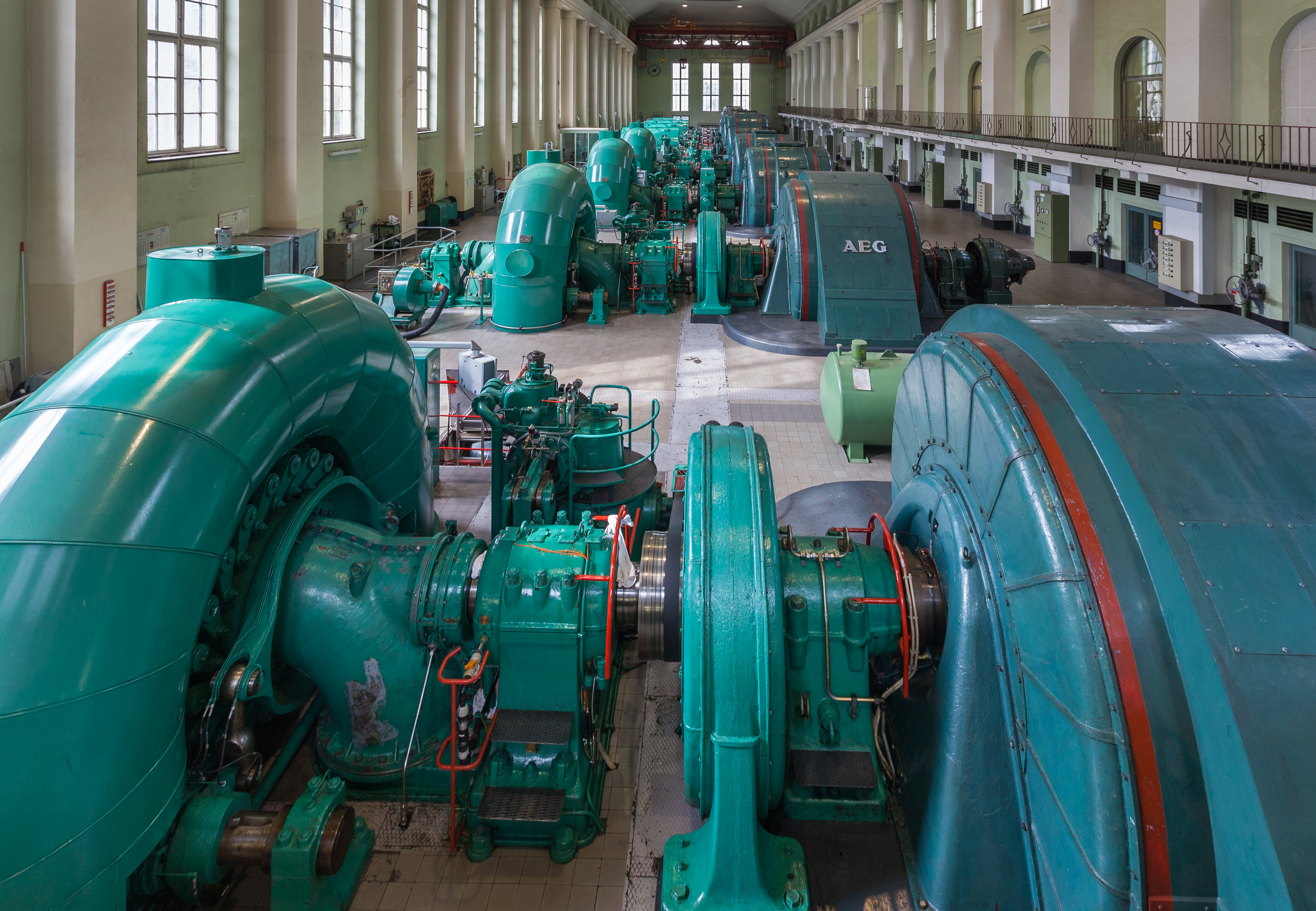
Overview of the turbines

The Walchensee Power Plant (German: Walchenseekraftwerk) is a hydroelectric power station in Bavaria, Germany. It is a storage power station that is fed water from the Walchensee which is then released into the Kochelsee. The installed capacity is 124 MW with an annual production of 300 GWh. The power plant is south of Kochelsee, about 14 km (8.7 mi) from the village of Walchensee. It is one of the largest of its kind in Germany and has been owned by Uniper Kraftwerke GmbH since 2016.

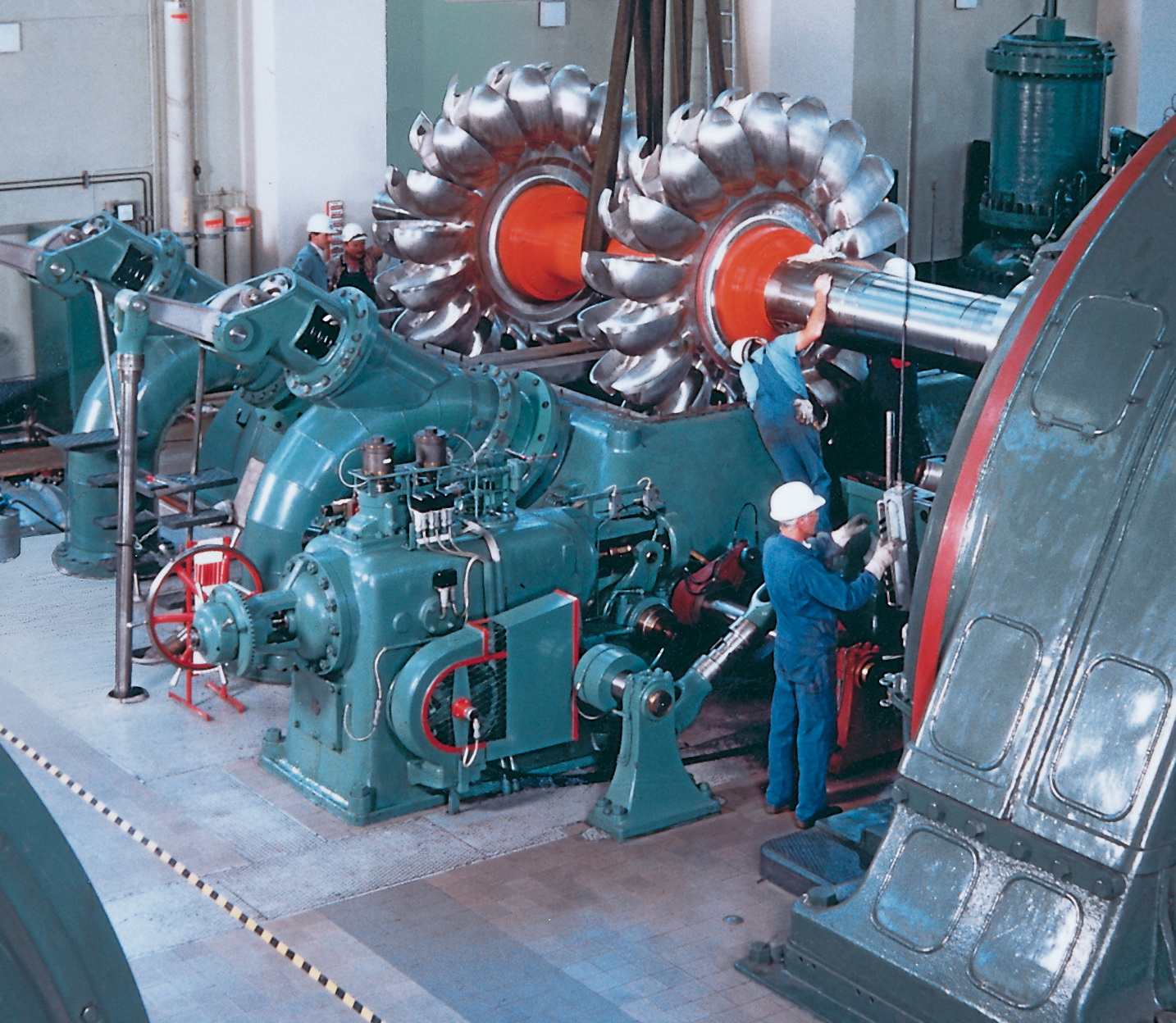
Changing of the Pelton wheels

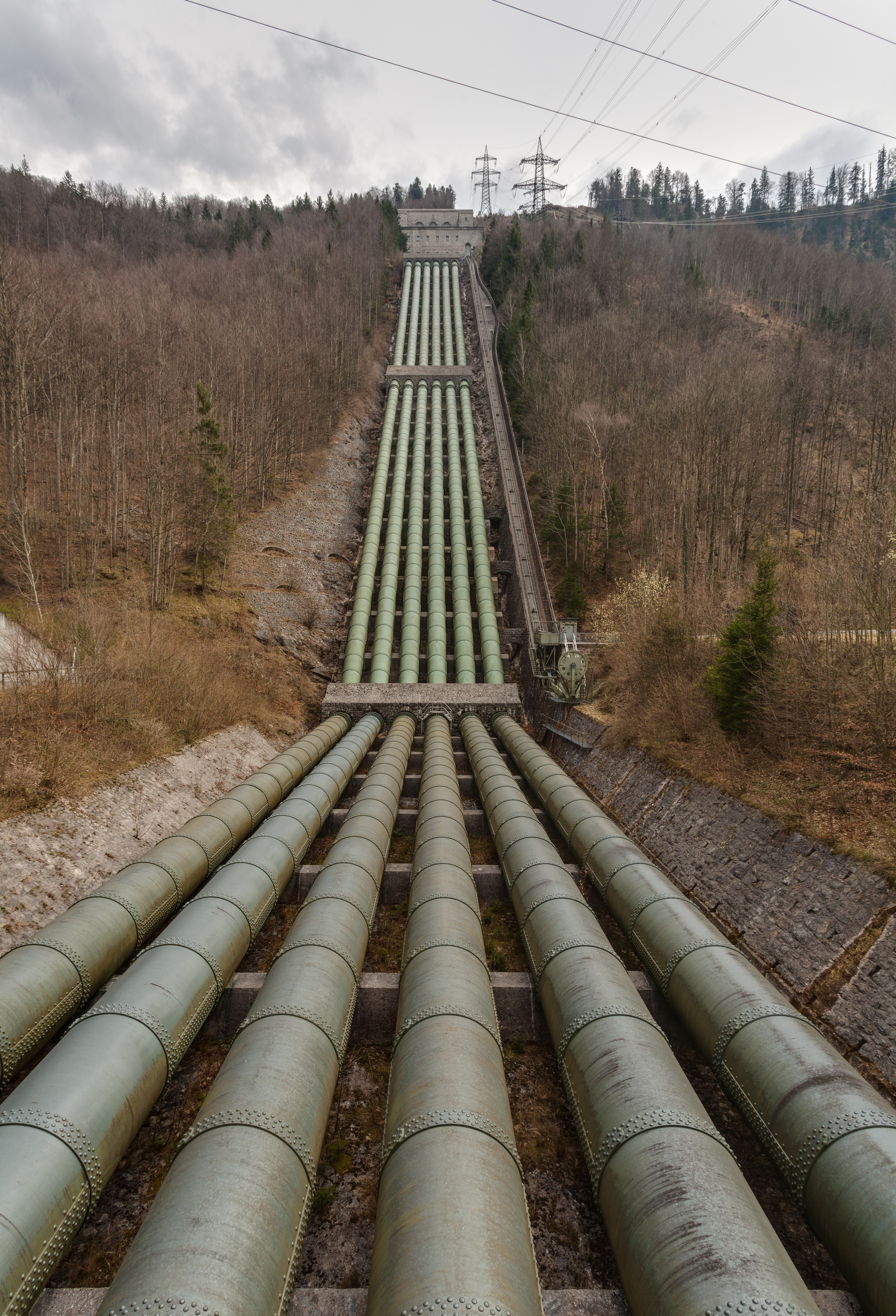
The six penstocks

== Technical operation ==
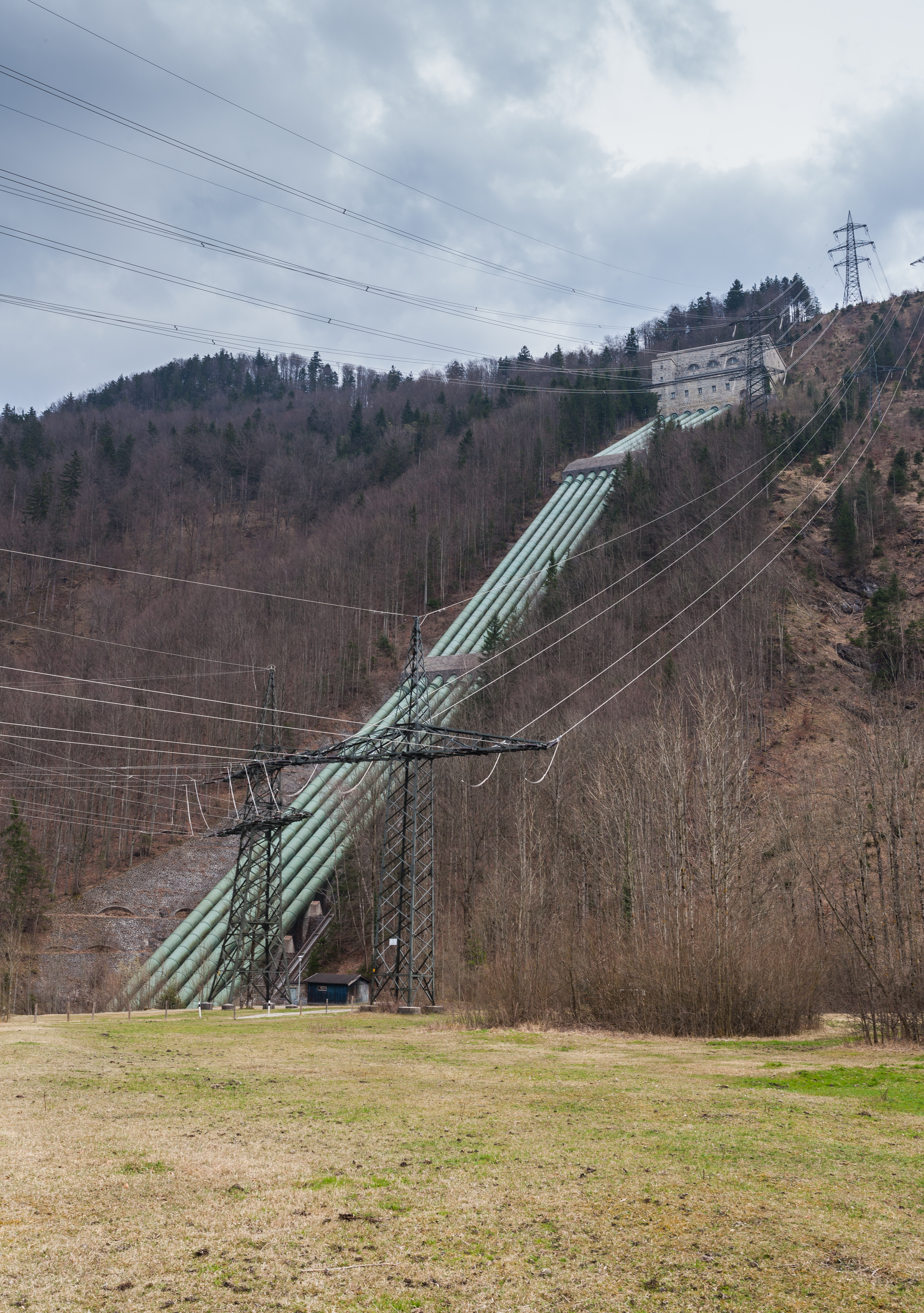
The six penstocks

The power station uses the hydraulic head of about 200 m (660 ft) between the Walchensee (acting as the upper reservoir, at 802 m/2,631 ft above sea level) and the Kochelsee (599 m/1,965 ft a.s.l.) to generate electricity. Through six, 450 m (1,480 ft) ducts connecting the two natural lakes, the water flows to the hydro-electric plant's four Pelton water turbines with single-phase generators, which power the German railroad network. Then it flows through four Francis water turbines with three-phase generators, linked to the European grid, and exits into the Kochelsee. Because the water level constantly changes, neither lake fully freezes in the winter; what does freeze on the lakes is potentially hazardous thin ice. The natural outflow of the Walchensee at Niedernach — over the Jachen to the River Isar — is blocked by a weir, but the natural inflow to the lake is still insufficient to provide enough water to the reservoir for the operation of the power station, so the waters of the Rißbach river are also used.

=== Isar transfer ===
The Isar, which flows as a whitewater river from the Austrian part of the Karwendel mountains, is dammed between Mittenwald and Krün by a weir to form the Krüner Isar reservoir (870 m/2,850 ft) and is then diverted to the Walchensee. This water flows past the Krün hydroelectric plant in an open channel, through a culvert, under the B 11 road at Wallgau and then via a tunnel to the Sachensee lake (867 m/2,844 ft). Here a 3.9 kilometer long penstock begins. At the end the water enters the hydro-electric power plant at (795 m/2,608 ft), propels the turbines, and finally flows into the lake.

=== Rißbach transfer ===
The Rißbach comes from the northern part of the Karwendel mountains, where it gathers the water of smaller streams in the Ahornboden area. After crossing the border between Tirol and Bavaria, and immediately after the inlet of the Fermersbach, a 6960 m adit carries water to the hydro-electric power plant at Niedernach at the southeast end of the Walchensee. The power station has been in operation since 1951.

=== Distinctive features ===
The main road from the village of Walchensee to Urfeld runs below the steep slopes of the Herzogstand. Construction had to withstand the pressure exerted by the Walchensee on the embankment, so that the road did not slide away. If the water level in winter falls due to outflow through the Walchensee power station, use of the road by trucks is limited by weight restrictions. In spring plant operators are obligated to increase the water level again in such a way that traffic restrictions — primarily affecting tourism — can be lifted or penalties are imposed. During winter operators must monitor the snow accumulated in the catchment area to calculate the amount of melt water expected and to comply with water level requirements. As of 2010, the Walchensee, along with other Bavarian power stations in the region, produce 1.3 TWh of renewable electricity annually, i.e. the supply of close to 400,000 Bavarian households.

== History ==
Oskar von Miller was the developer and designer of the Walchensee power station. It was initially intended to support the electrification of the Bavarian railways, but the project was suspended by the Bavarian parliament in 1912. It was believed too much electric power would be generated and the economic benefits were in doubt. In 1915, von Miller suggested integrating the proposed power station into the region's power grid and the state-owned power supply company Bayernwerk. The Bavarian parliament agreed to the construction of the power plant in 1918. Construction began in December 1918, and required an extensive supply of electric power for the heavy machinery. The nearby Kesselbach dam could only provide a third of the required output, and traction engines attached to steam-powered generators supplied the balance.

In 1924 the plant began producing electrical power. The problem of transporting that power over long distances was solved with the introduction of overhead power lines.

The plant was originally owned by the state-owned Bayernwerk AG (Bavarian Works Company). Bayernwerk was later denationalised and taken over by VIAG (Vereinigte Industrieunternehmungen) and as a result the power station is now operated by E.ON Wasserkraft GmbH.

=== World War II wind tunnel ===
To develop Nazi Germany's planned A10 rocket, a new Mach 10 wind tunnel was planned at the power station. The new power plant was to use the 202 meter difference from the Walchensee down to the Kochelsee to generate 120 megawatts. However, instead of a new wind tunnel and power plant, the Mach 4.4 wind tunnel used for V-2 rocket development was moved to the site following the 1943 Operation Hydra bombing of Peenemünde, and the new powerplant was completed after the war. The wind tunnel was moved to White Oak, Maryland, after the war.
