= Kochelsee =

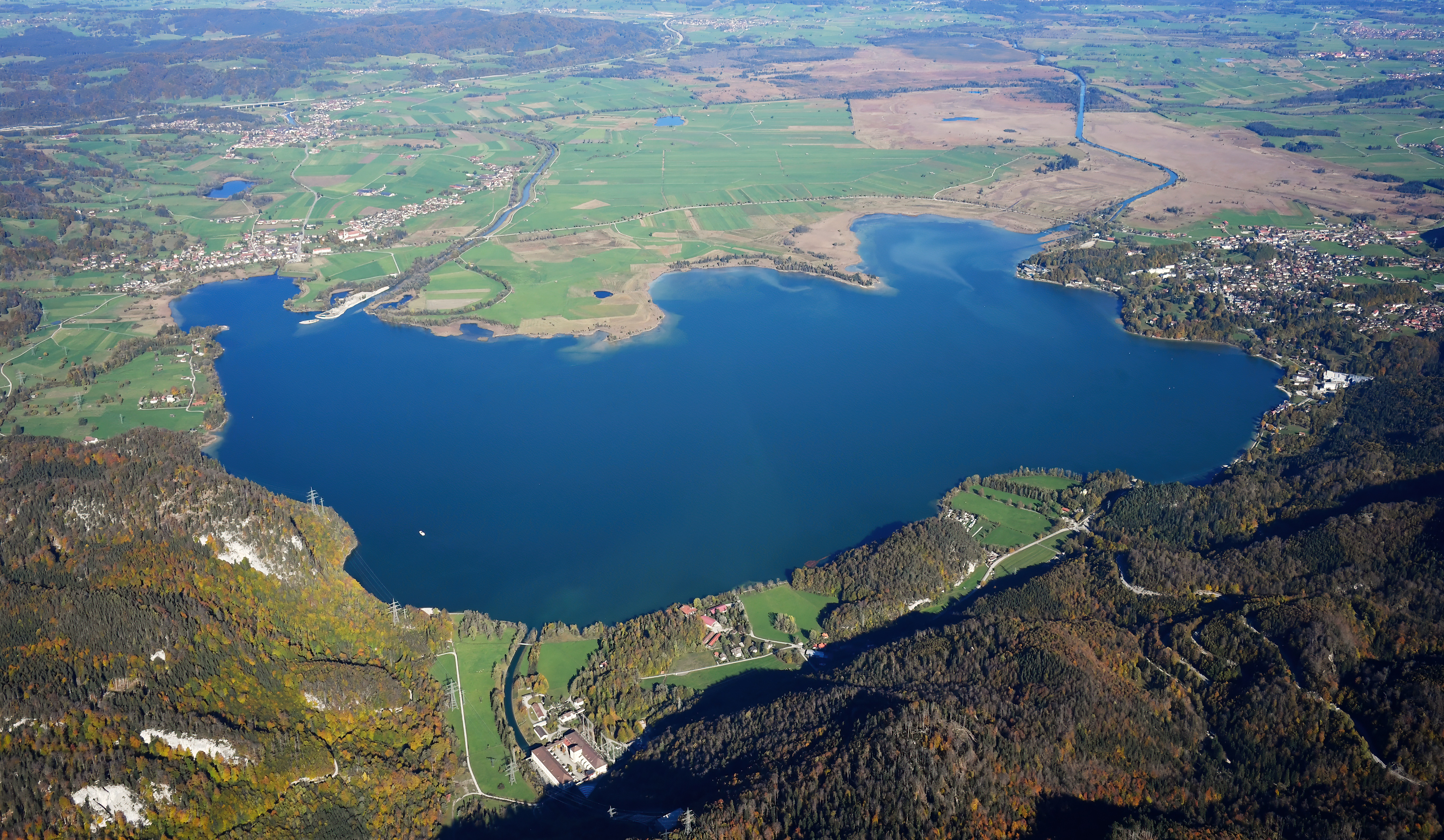
- Aerial view from the south

- Location within Bavaria
- Location: Upper Bavaria
- Coordinates: 47°38′46″N 11°20′14″E
- Type: glacial lake
- Primary inflows: Isar, Loisach
- Primary outflows: Loisach
- Basin countries: Germany
- Surface area: 5.9 km^{2} (2.3 mi^{2})
- Max. depth: 66 m (217 ft)
- Shore length^{1}: 15 km (9.3 mi)
- Surface elevation: 600 m (2,000 ft)
- Settlements: Kochel am See; Schlehdorf
- ^{1} Shore length is not a well-defined measure.

Kochelsee (German pronunciation: [ˈkɔxl̩ˌzeː]) or Lake Kochel is a lake 70 kilometres (43 mi) south of Munich on the edge of the Bavarian Alps. The western 1.7 km² or 28.3 percent of the lake lies within the borders of the town of Schlehdorf, while the rest belongs to Kochel am See. The southern edge of the lake lies up against the mountains and the northern shore is bordered by bog lands. The history of the settlement of Kochel (previously Quochcalun) begins with Birg bei Altjoch, a rock extrusion on the shore of the lake. The name Kochel is derived from the Latin cocula meaning head or cone.

The Loisach flows into the lake at Schlehdorf and flows out at Kochel am See. A similar amount of water flows into the lake from the Isar through the Lake Walchen Power Plant.

== Origin ==
The lake was created during the last glacial period of the current ice age by the Loisach-Isar glacier. The bottom of the glacier scraped out the lakebed. The basin then filled with water at the end of the glacial period. The northern end of the lake silted up forming bogs.

== Settlements ==
The following settlements border the lake:

- Kochel am See
- Raut (part of Schlehdorf)
- Schlehdorf
- Altjoch (part of Kochel am See)

All are part of the district Bad Tölz-Wolfratshausen.

== See also ==
- Stein, a mountain overlooking the lake near Kochel am See
- List of lakes in Bavaria
