= Rißbach =

River in Germany

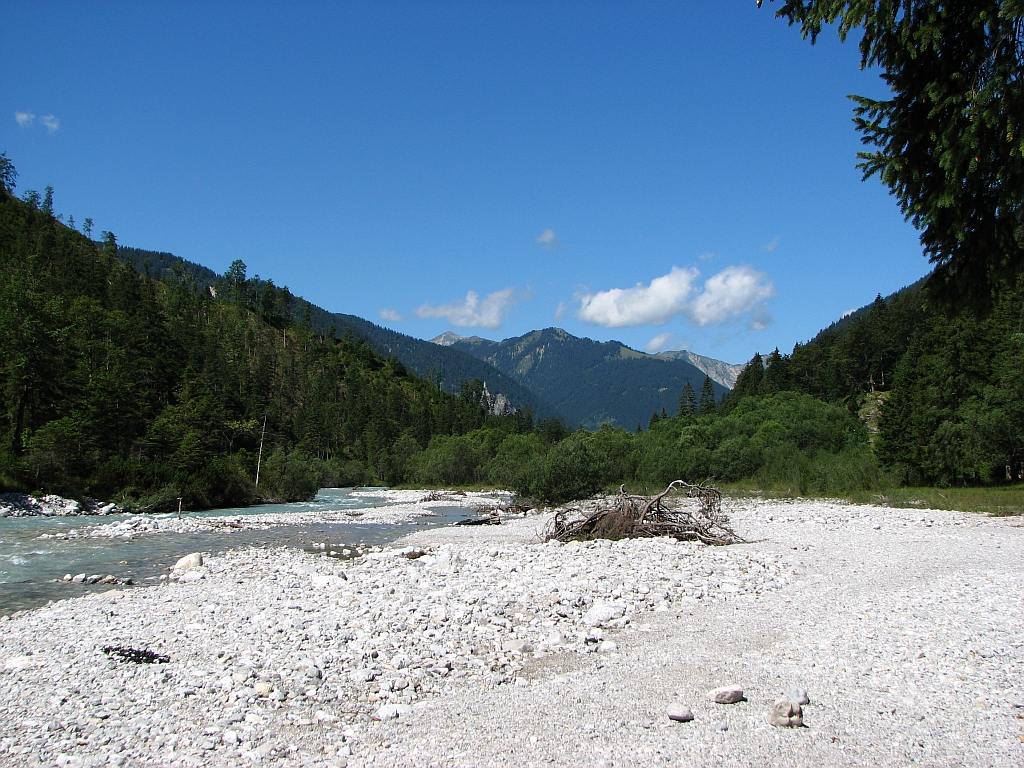
- The Rißbach

Location
- Countries: Germany and Austria
- States: Bavaria and Tyrol

Physical characteristics
- Mouth
  - location: Isar
  - coordinates: 47.5583°N 11.4333°E
- Length: 29.7 km (18.5 mi)
- Basin size: 217 km^{2} (84 sq mi)

Basin features
- Progression: Isar→ Danube→ Black Sea

Rißbach is a river of Tyrol, Austria and Bavaria, Germany. Its source is in the Karwendel mountains in Austria. It passes through the valley Rißtal, and flows into the Isar in Vorderriß, Lenggries, Germany.

== See also ==
- List of rivers of Bavaria
