= Isar =

River in Austria and Germany

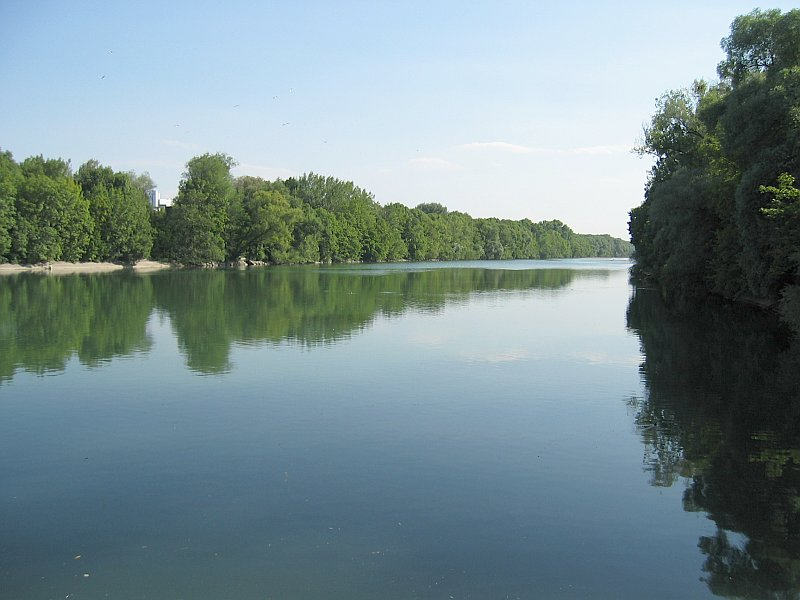
- The river Isar near Munich

Location
- Countries: Germany; Austria

Physical characteristics
- Source
  - location: Eiskarlspitze, Alps, Austria
  - coordinates: 47°22′29″N 11°24′43″E
  - elevation: 1,160 m (3,810 ft)
- Mouth
  - location: Danube
  - coordinates: 48°48′11″N 12°58′35″E
- Length: 291.5 km (181.1 mi)
- Basin size: 8,962 km^{2} (3,460 sq mi)
- Discharge
  - location: mouth
  - average: 174 m^{3}/s (6,100 cu ft/s)

Basin features
- Progression: Danube→ Black Sea

The Isar (pronounced [ˈiːzaʁ]) is a river in Austria and in Bavaria, Germany. Its source is in the Karwendel mountain range of the Alps. The Isar river enters Germany near Mittenwald and flows through Krün, Wallgau, Bad Tölz, Munich, and Landshut, before entering the Danube near Deggendorf. With 295 km (183 mi) length, it is among the longest rivers in Bavaria, and it is Germany's second most important tributary of the Danube.

== Etymology ==
One theory is that the name Isar stems from *es or *is in the Indo-European languages, meaning "flowing water", and later turned into a word with a meaning narrowed to frozen water (hence English ice, German: Eis) in Proto-Germanic. The name itself is mentioned for the first time in 763 as Isura. Related names include:

- Eisack / Isarco (Italy)
- Ésera (Spain)
- Isar (Spanish town, in the province of Burgos)
- Isauro (Italy)
- Isère (France)
- Isel (Austria)
- IJssel (Netherlands; known to Romans as Isala)
- IJzer/Yser (Belgium)
- Isonzo (Slovenia, Italy)
- Jizera (Czech Republic)

== Geography ==
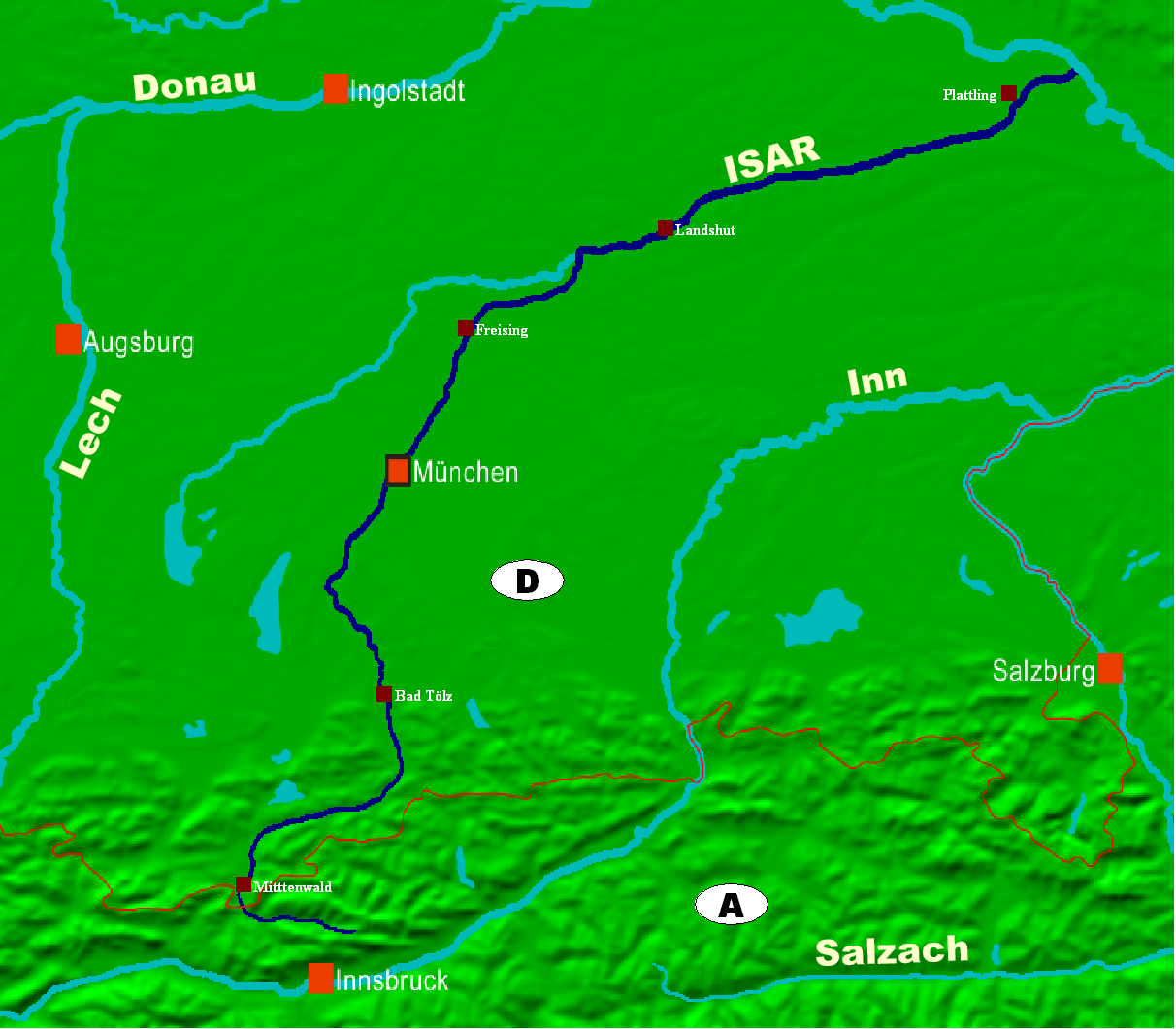
Map of the Isar

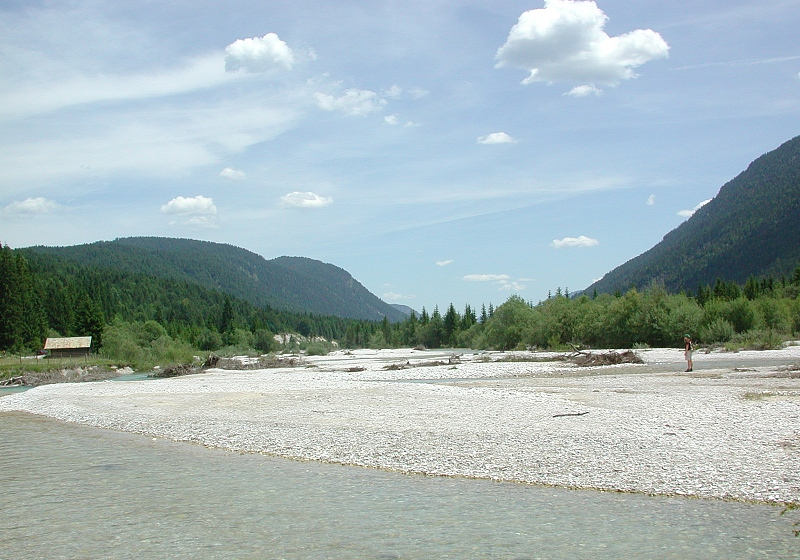
The river Isar north of Mittenwald, near Garmisch

The Isar river drains a substantial part of the Bavarian Alps and parts of the Karwendel mountains.

Apart from the larger tributaries of Loisach and Amper, many smaller rivers flow into the Isar. The drainage basin contains some 9,000 square kilometers (roughly 3,500 square miles). During the winter, most of the precipitation in the Alps turns into snow. The snowmelt can result in an increased water flow down the Isar rivers during the spring meltdown. It has an average discharge at the mouth of 174 m^{3}/s.

The official source of the Isar is located in the Hinterau valley east of the village Scharnitz in the Karwendel mountains at 1160m above sea level. The Lavatschbach is the Isar's longest headstream. A further source for the young Isar is the Birkkarbach, which has its sources in the Birkkarspitze mountain.

The Isar enters Upper Bavaria after c. 22 km just north of Scharnitz and the Isar is dammed for the first time between Mittenwald and Krün. Some of the Isar waters are channeled via the Rißbach into the Walchensee, the Rißbach flow direction having been reversed. The Isar water flows into the giant downpipes of the Walchensee Hydroelectric Power Station. 200 metres lower, the Walchensee Hydroelectric Power Station releases water into the Kochelsee. From here, it flows into the river Loisach, Isar's second most important tributary.

Not far down the Isar river is a large reservoir called Sylvensteinsee, created between 1954 and 1959 to make more energy generation possible and also to avoid flooding. It is located some 12 km south of Lenggries. It has prevented the flooding of Munich, for example in 1979, 1999, and most recently in 2005. At Bad Tölz, the Isar leaves the Bavarian Alps. Bad Tölz marks the river's transit from its upper to its middle course.

The Isar river flows through a sub-alpine, glacial morainic landscape towards Wolfratshausen. Just north of the town the Loisach flows into the Isar. The Isar continues on to and through the Munich gravel plain which ends within the city limits of Munich. Further downstream, the river passes Freising, then the Amper flows into the Isar, its most important tributary, at Moosburg. This is where the lower course of the Isar river begins.

Passing Landshut, the river makes its way through the Tertiary Hills of Lower Bavaria all the way into the Danube river. The Isar river descends some 848m to flow into the Danube, about five kilometres away from Deggendorf.

== History ==
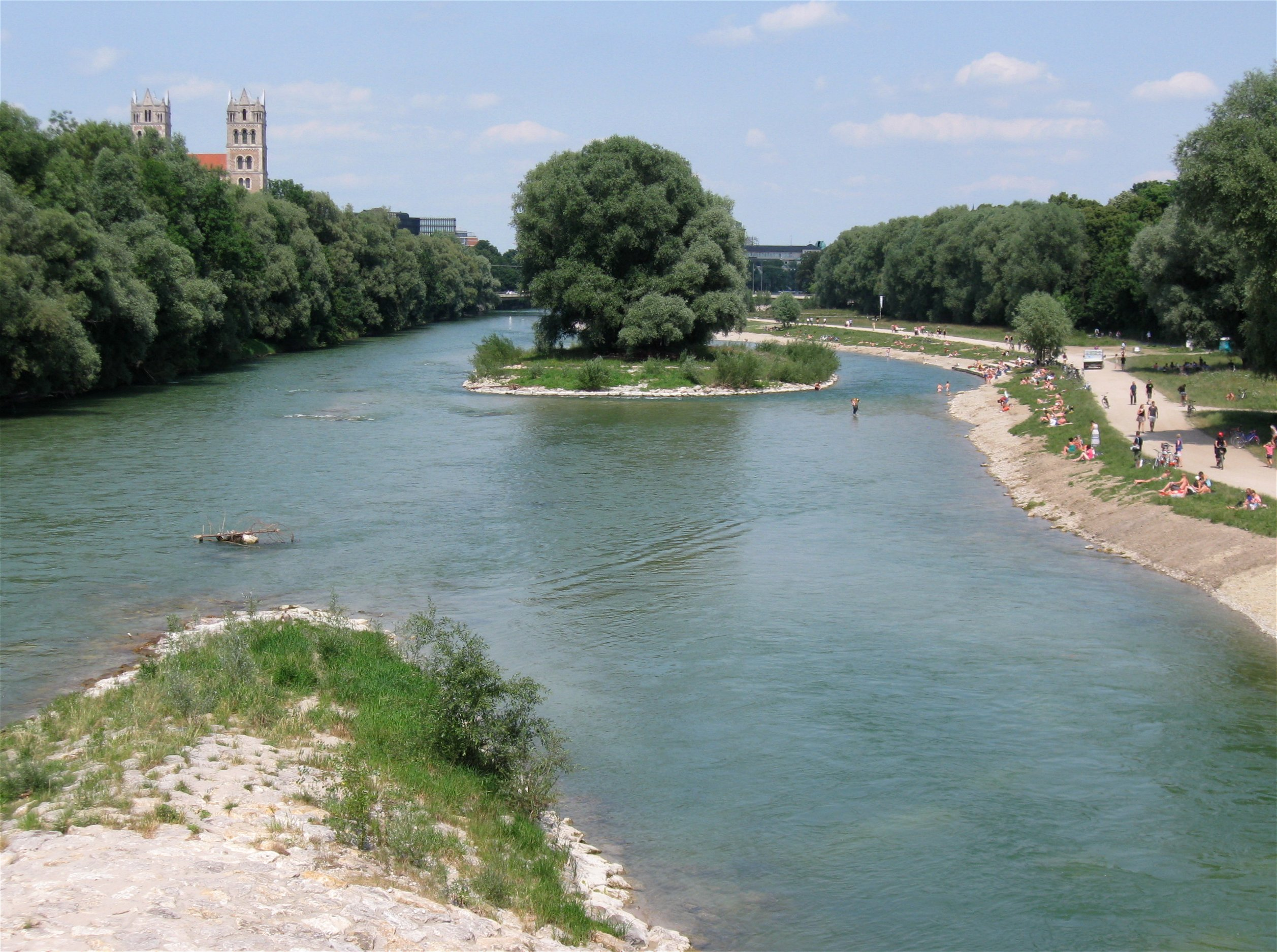
The Isar in Munich, near the Deutsches Museum

Among Central European habitats, Alpine rivers are ranked among those most substantially altered by humans over the past hundred years. The Isar rivers are now protected from development.

The river was a pre-historic trade route, and in the Bronze Age Munich was among the largest raft ports in Europe.

At the lower Isar, between Moosburg and Plattling, gold was washed from the river's sediments during the 16th and 17th century. However, there was no big economic revenue in this due to the minor amounts of the metal found in the river. Industrialization gave rise to a sociotechnical system where the Isar River was economically exploited through multifunctional use. Over forty hydropower plants were built on the Isar to electrify Bavaria.

Following their executions on October 16, 1946, there were unconfirmed reports that the ashes of the convicted Nazi war criminals Joachim von Ribbentrop, Hans Frank, Wilhelm Keitel, Alfred Jodl, Alfred Rosenberg, Ernst Kaltenbrunner, Wilhelm Frick, Arthur Seyss-Inquart, Fritz Sauckel, and Julius Streicher were scattered in the Isar, as were those of Hermann Göring who had committed suicide the previous night in defiance of his scheduled execution.

In the 1940s and 1950s, the federal state of Bavaria financed the construction of major hydroelectric power plants, the Sylvenstein reservoir on the Isar was constructed between 1954 and 1959.

Between 2000 and 2011, the Isar-plan was implemented to reduce the risk of flooding. The planning and implementation was the responsibility of the Regional Office for Water Management and the city of Munich. Embankments were removed and the river bed was widened, establishing connections to surrounding flood plains. Riverbed rock ramps were constructed so that fish could move upstream again.

== Environmental issues ==
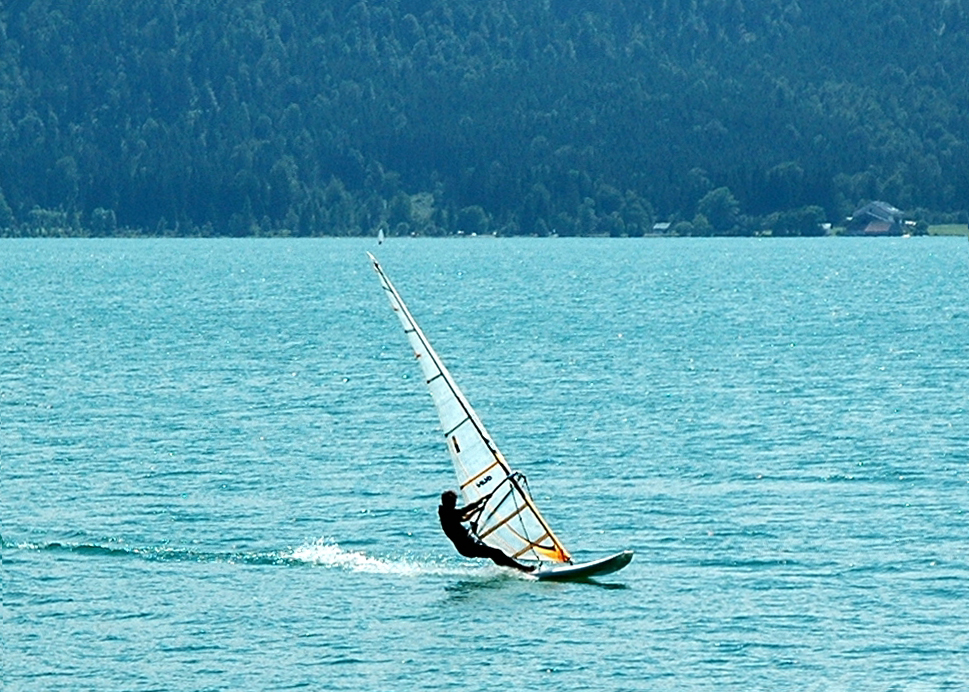
A windsurfer near the western shores of the Walchensee

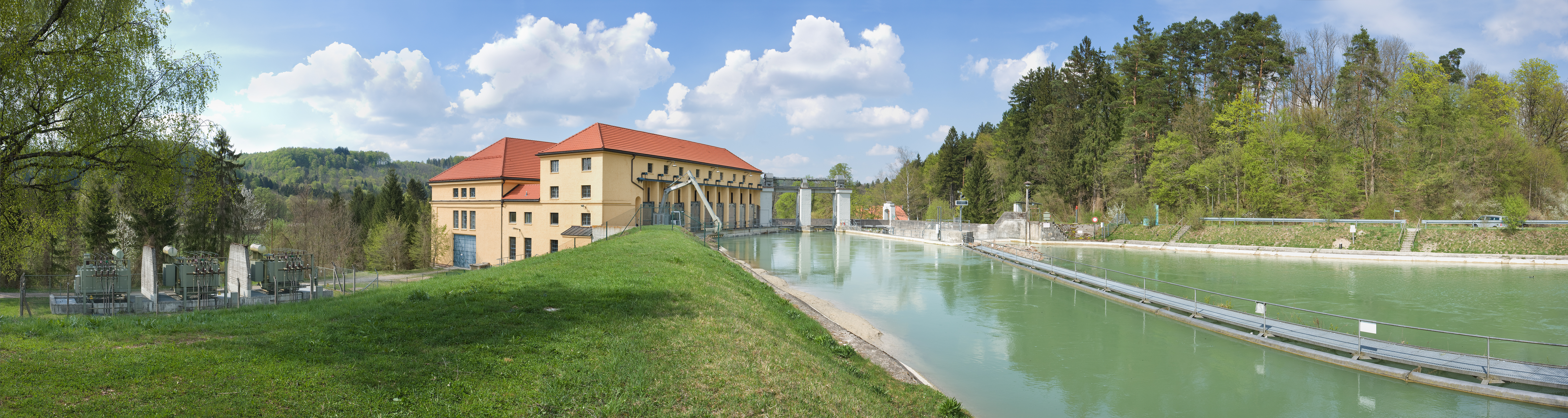
Feed of river power plant Muehltal, south of Munich. Hydroelectricity supplied yearly: 70 million kilowatt hours.

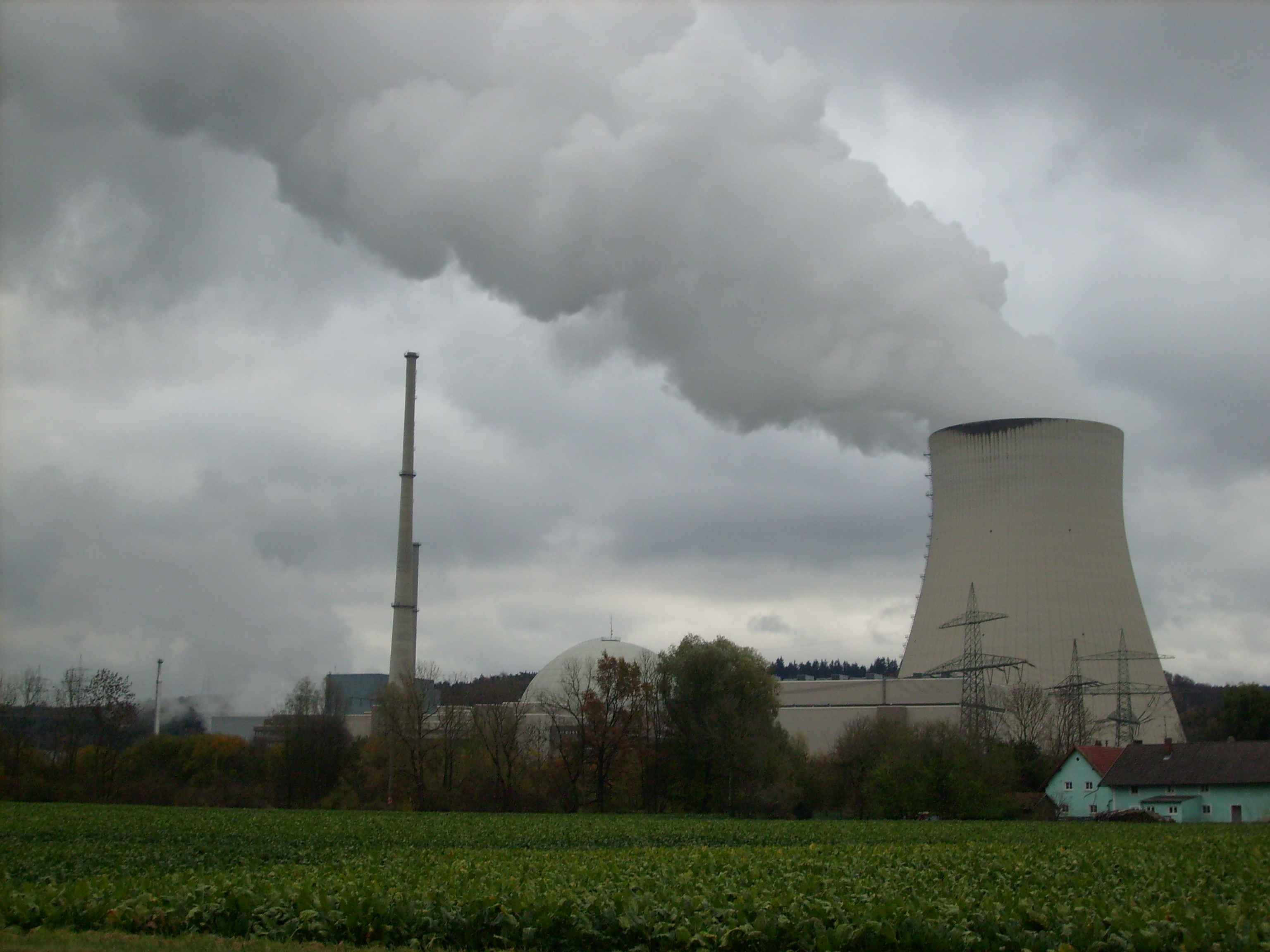
A view of the nuclear power plant PreussenElektra

Since the 1920s, the water of the river Isar has been used for the generation of electricity. This has had far-reaching consequences for the local fauna and flora. To provide the 28 hydroelectric power plants with enough water power, the river's water is diverted several times and almost the whole river was canalized. For example, just north of Mittenwald all the river's water was diverted to the lake Walchensee in 1923 for the Walchensee hydroelectric plant. Since 1990, a small portion of the water, 4 cubic meters per second (roughly 1,100 U.S. gallons per second) is allowed to remain in the river Isar to prevent drought.

The construction of the Sylvenstein Dam and numerous regulations relating to the river, pushed through in the early 19th century, have strongly enhanced its character. The construction of the Sylvenstein dam has prevented the river from overflowing its banks. Lately, there have been attempts to bring the Isar river closer back to a natural character. For example, since May 2000 the river is being re-naturalized in the southern part of the river's passage through the city of Munich. The riverbed is being widened, the banks are flattened and small gravel islands are built along with near-natural rock ramps to slow the waterflow.

Besides an improved protection against flooding the Isar river was, thus, brought into an almost natural state and this resulted in an improved quality of the recreational area within the city of Munich. The municipal wastewater treatment has also been upgraded along the river. The water pollution, however, is still relatively high. Together with other cities and communities along the river Isar, Munich has set a goal to reduce the number of germs. The sewer treatment plants on the upper river are now disinfecting the raw sewage with ultraviolet.

To preserve the beauty of the Isar valley Gabriel von Seidl founded the Isartalverein in 1902. This first civil initiative from Munich purchased 90 ha of land, and today maintains more than 330 km of hiking trails.
