= Kochel =

Kochel a.See
- Municipality
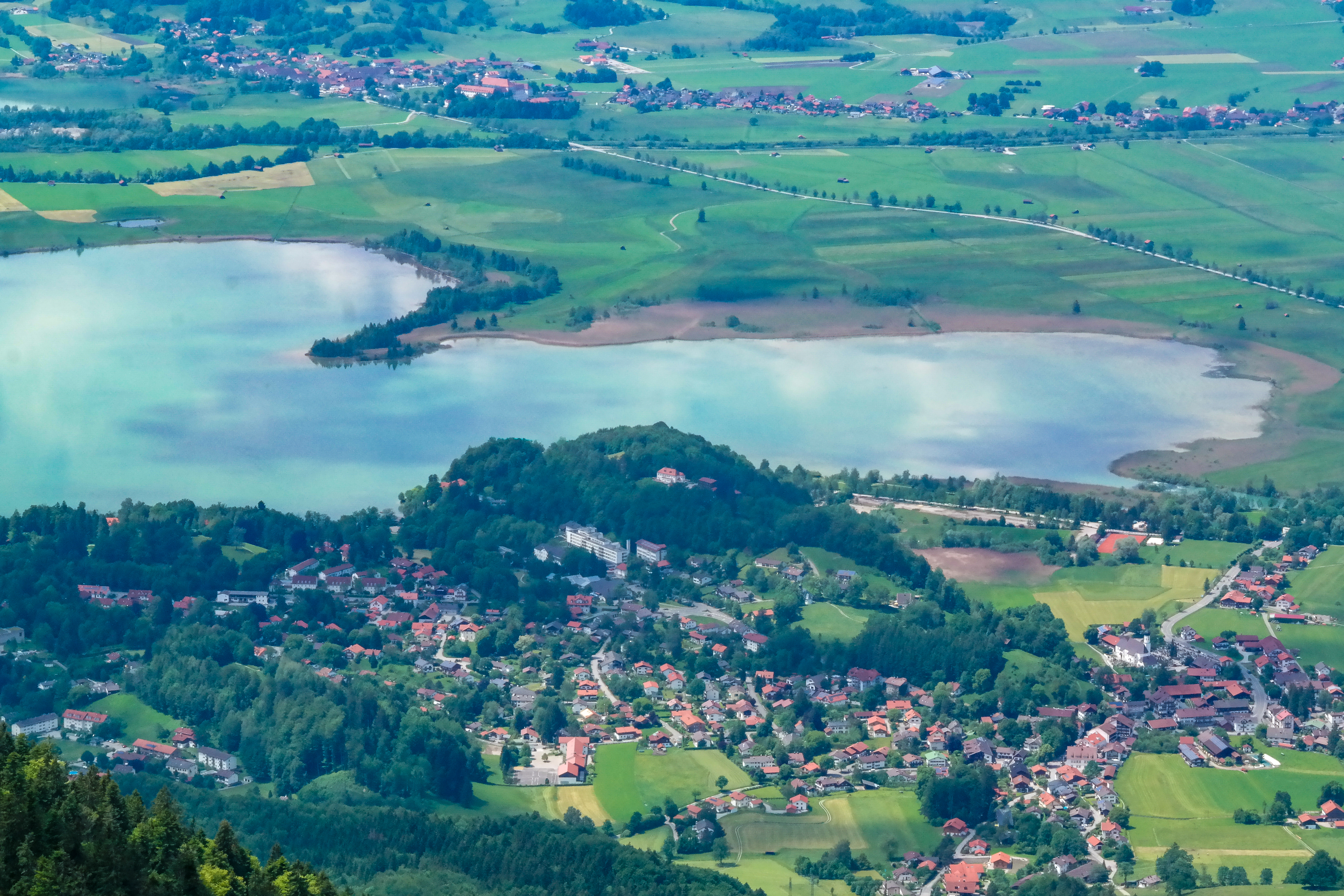
- Kochel on the shore of Kochelsee

- Coat of arms

- Location of Kochel a.See within Bad Tölz-Wolfratshausen district
- Interactive map of Kochel a.See
- Location within Germany Location within Bavaria
- Coordinates: 47°39′17″N 11°21′53″E
- Country: Germany
- State: Bavaria
- Admin. region: Upper Bavaria
- District: Bad Tölz-Wolfratshausen
- Municipal assoc.: Kochel am See

Government
  - Mayor (2024–30): Jens Müller

Area
  - Total: 80.11 km^{2} (30.93 sq mi)
- Elevation: 605 m (1,985 ft)

Population (2025-12-31)
  - Total: 4,075
  - Density: 50.87/km^{2} (131.7/sq mi)
- Time zone: UTC+01:00 (CET)
  - Summer (DST): UTC+02:00 (CEST)
- Postal codes: 82431
- Dialling codes: 08851
- Vehicle registration: TÖL
- Website: www.kochel.de

Kochel am See (German pronunciation: [ˈkɔxl̩ ʔam ˈzeː], lit. 'Kochel on the Lake') is a municipality and a town in the district of Bad Tölz-Wolfratshausen in Bavaria, on the shores of Kochelsee. The municipality consists of the Altjoch, Brunnenbach, Ort, Pessenbach, Pfisterberg, Walchensee and Ried districts.

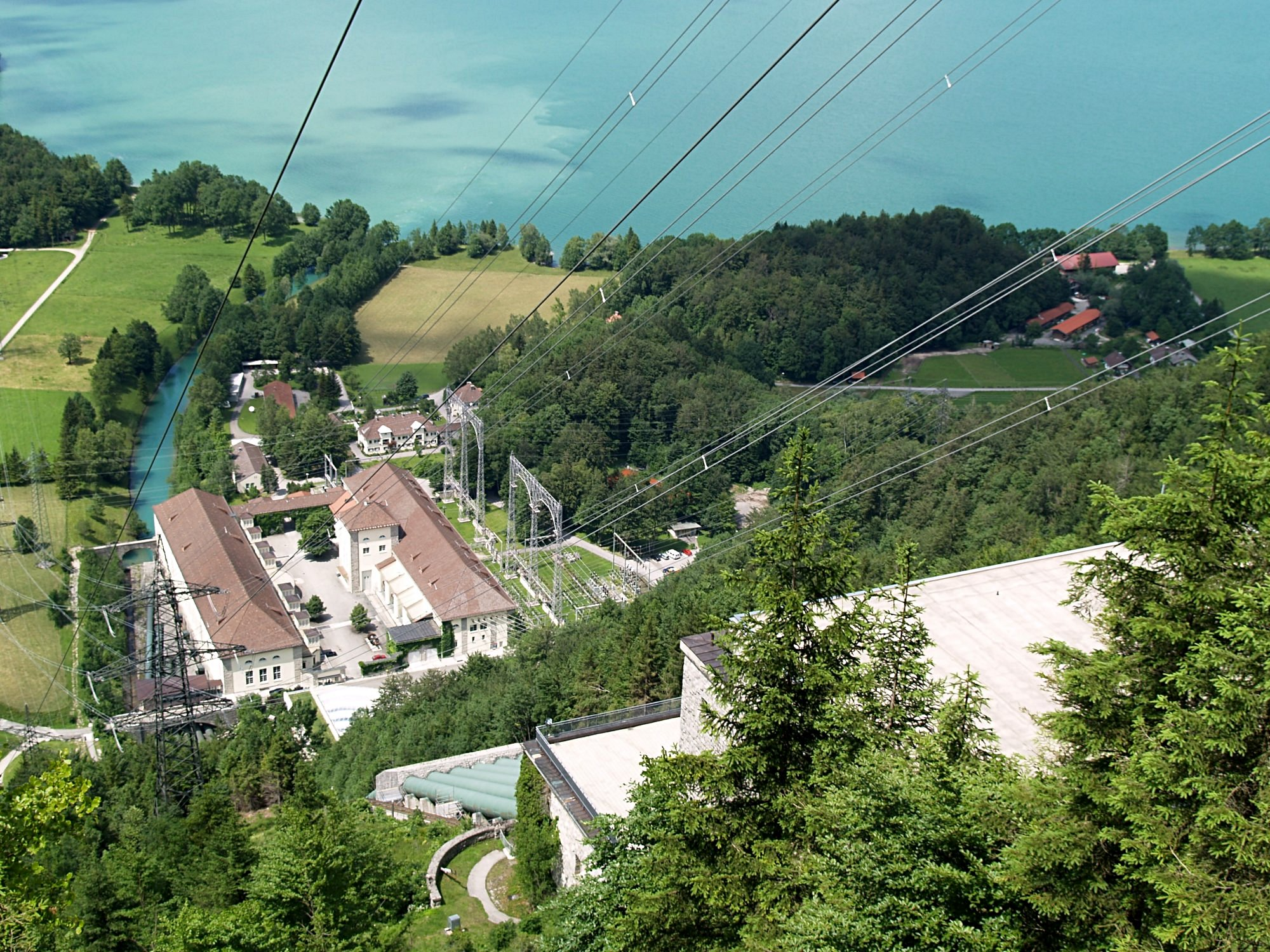
The Walchenseekraftwerk hydroelectric power plant

== People ==
Apart from its scenery, the settlement is known for the Smith of Kochel ("Schmied von Kochel"), who, according to legend, led a Bavarian farmers' rebellion against Austro-Hungarian occupiers at Sendling in the War of the Spanish Succession. Kochel is also known for its hydroelectric dam. It is a popular place for winter and summer holidays.

The expressionist painter Franz Marc lived and is buried in Kochel. His life and work is documented at the Franz Marc Museum in Kochel.

- Elisabeth Demleitner (born 1952), German luger
- Michael Mellinger (1929–2004), German actor
- Andrea Sawatzki (born 1963), German actress
- August von Finck Sr. (1898–1980), German entrepreneur

== Transport ==
The municipality has a railway station, Kochel, on the Kochelsee Railway.

== Points of interest ==
- Walchensee Hydroelectric Power Station

== Others ==
Kochel am See station was used primarely as Kalthenthal train station for the ARD sitcom Um Himmels Willen.
