= Jachenau =

- Municipality
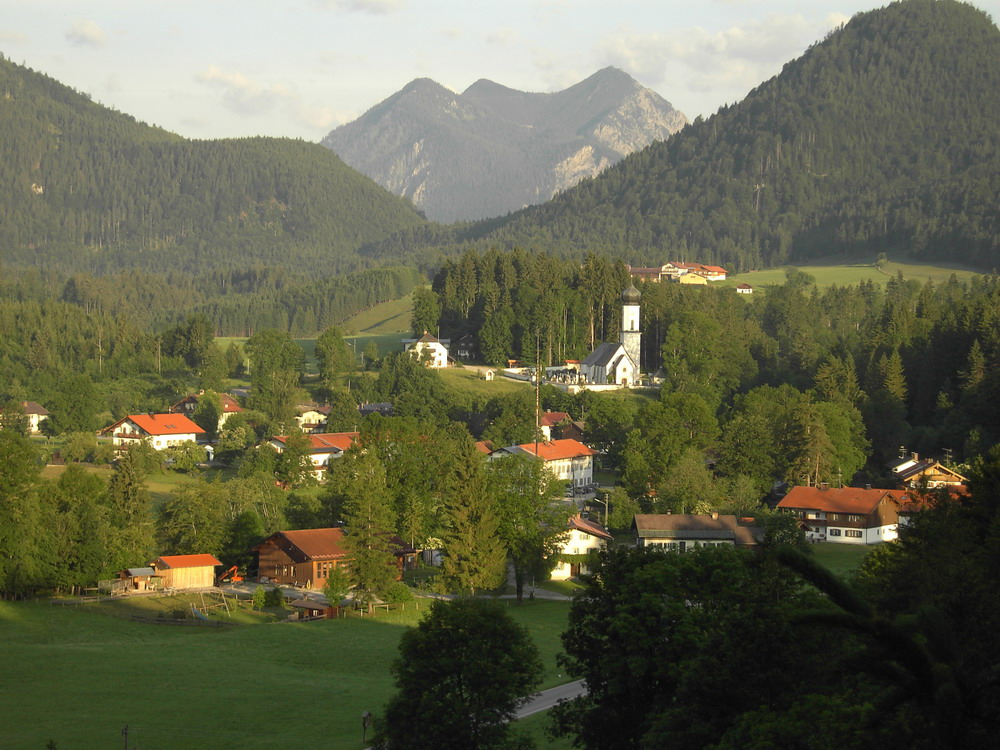
- View towards Jachenau

- Coat of arms

- Location of Jachenau within Bad Tölz-Wolfratshausen district
- Interactive map of Jachenau
- Location within Germany Location within Bavaria
- Coordinates: 47°36′N 11°26′E
- Country: Germany
- State: Bavaria
- Admin. region: Oberbayern
- District: Bad Tölz-Wolfratshausen

Government
  - Mayor (2020–26): Nikolaus Rauchenberger (FW)

Area
  - Total: 128.63 km^{2} (49.66 sq mi)
- Elevation: 790 m (2,590 ft)

Population (2025-12-31)
  - Total: 830
  - Density: 6.5/km^{2} (17/sq mi)
- Time zone: UTC+01:00 (CET)
  - Summer (DST): UTC+02:00 (CEST)
- Postal codes: 83676
- Dialling codes: 08043
- Vehicle registration: TÖL
- Website: www.jachenau.de

Jachenau is a municipality in the district of Bad Tölz-Wolfratshausen in Bavaria in Germany. It is one of the least dense populated municipalities in the country. On the other hand, it is one of the most forested municipalities in Germany.
