= 48th G7 summit =

2022 international leader meeting in Germany

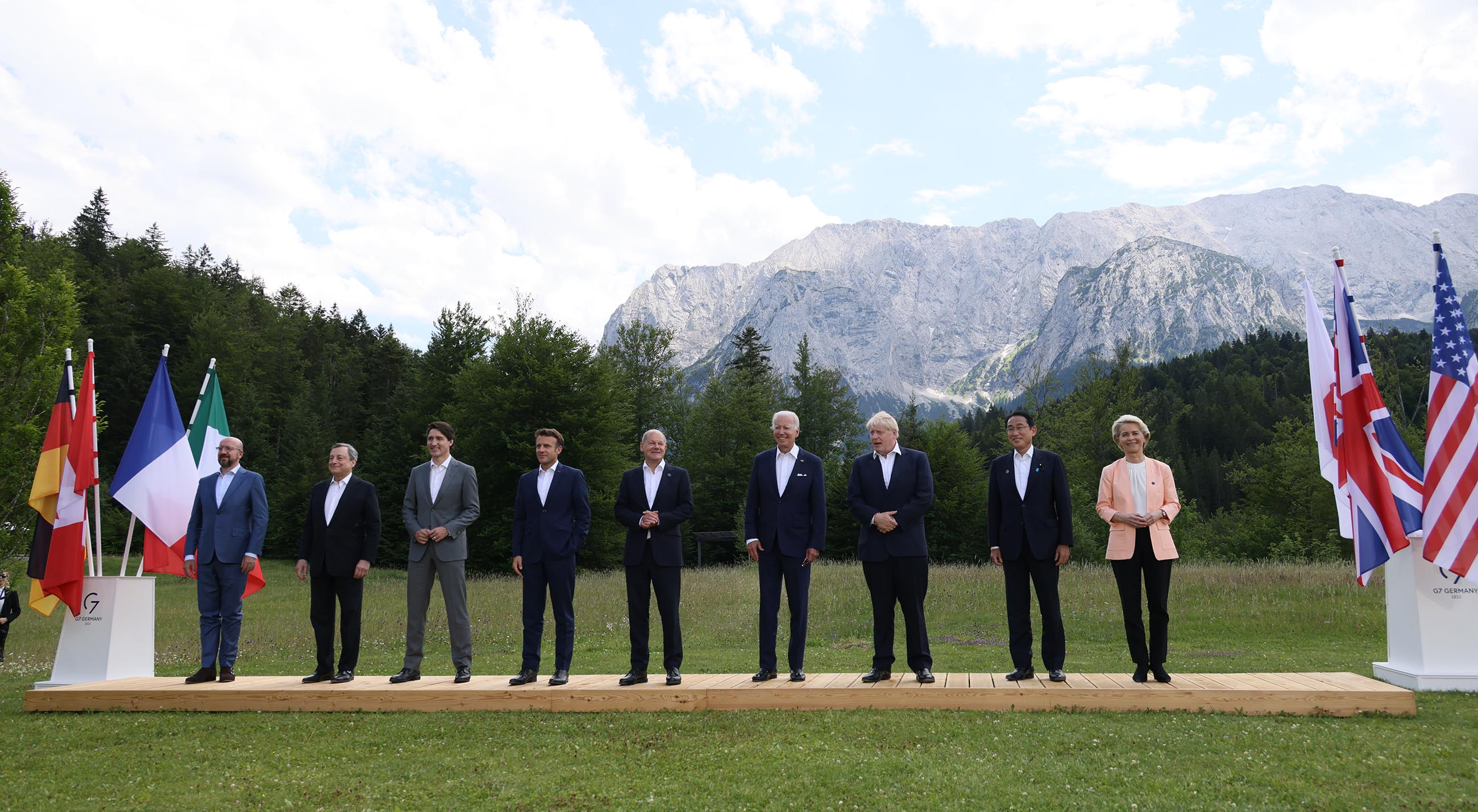
- Host country: Germany
- Date: 26–28 June 2022
- Cities: Krün
- Venues: Schloss Elmau
- Participants: Canada; France; Germany; Italy; Japan; United Kingdom; United States; European Union; Invited guests: Argentina; India; Indonesia; Senegal; South Africa; Ukraine
- Follows: 47th G7 summit
- Precedes: 49th G7 summit
- Website: www.g7germany.de/g7-en

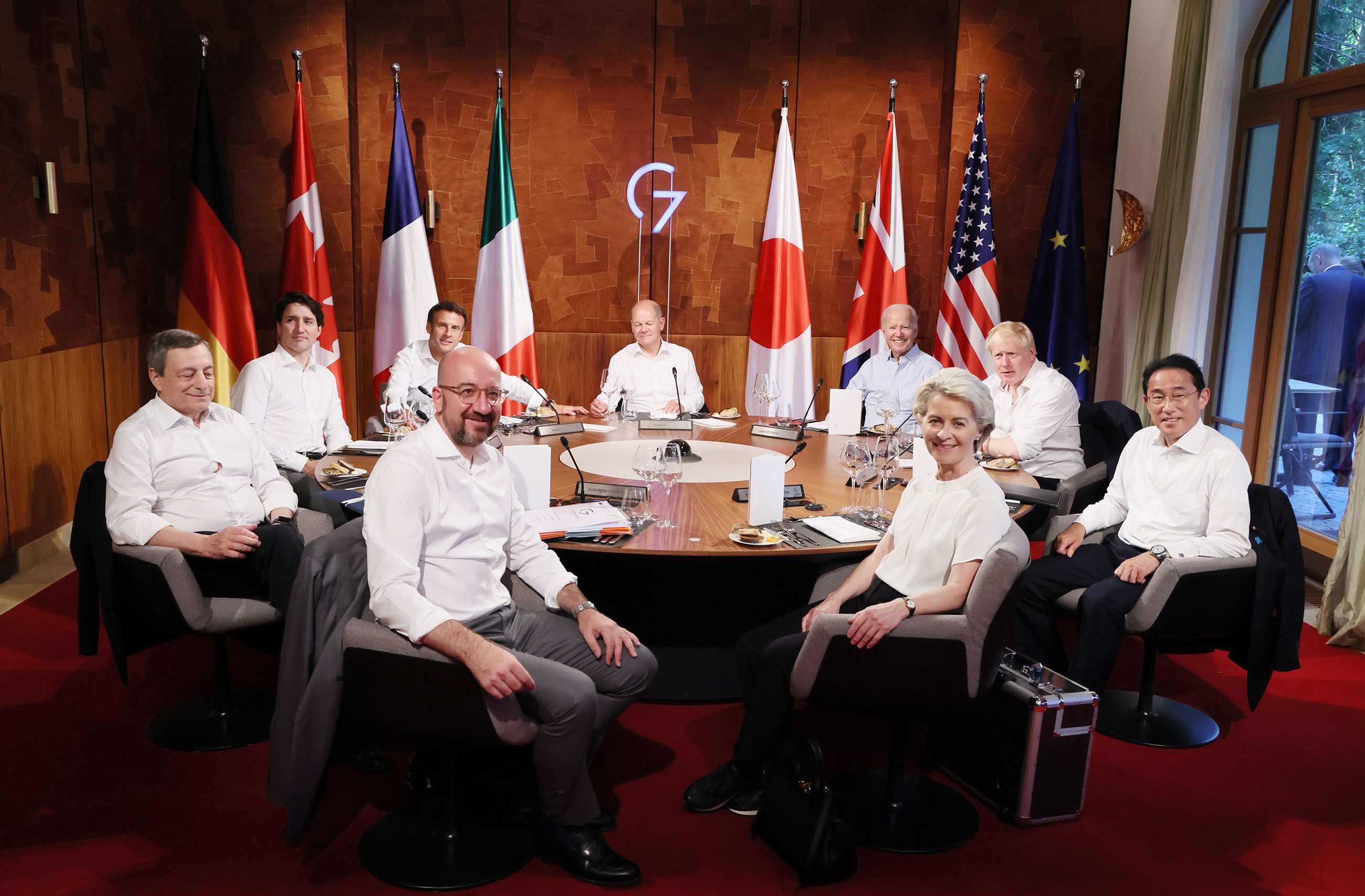
G7 leaders dressed in white (except Biden) during a roundtable meeting (26 June 2022)

The 48th G7 summit was held from 26 to 28 June 2022 in Schloss Elmau, Krün, Bavarian Alps, Germany. The previous G7 summit chaired by Germany in 2015 was also held at Schloss Elmau: the first time that the same hotel was chosen twice as a venue for the G7.

== Leaders at the summit ==
The 2022 summit was the first summit for German Chancellor Olaf Scholz and Japanese Prime Minister Fumio Kishida. It was also the final summit for British Prime Minister Boris Johnson and Italian Prime Minister Mario Draghi.

=== Participants and representatives ===
Core G7 Members The host state and leader are shown in bold text.
Member		Represented by	Title
(Canada)	Canada	Justin Trudeau	Prime Minister
(France)	France	Emmanuel Macron	President
(Germany)	**Germany (Host)**	**Olaf Scholz**	**Chancellor**
(Italy)	Italy	Mario Draghi	Prime Minister
(Japan)	Japan	Fumio Kishida	Prime Minister
(United Kingdom)	United Kingdom	Boris Johnson	Prime Minister
(United States)	United States	Joe Biden	President
(European Union)	European Union	Ursula von der Leyen	Commission President
(European Union)	European Union	Charles Michel	Council President
**Invitees**
Guest		Represented by	Title
(Argentina)	Argentina	Alberto Fernández	President
(India)	India	Narendra Modi	Prime Minister
(Indonesia)	Indonesia	Joko Widodo	President
(Senegal)	Senegal	Macky Sall	President
(South Africa)	South Africa	Cyril Ramaphosa	President
(Ukraine)	Ukraine	Volodymyr Zelenskyy (virtually present)	President
	G7 GEAC	Jutta Allmendinger	Chairwoman
	International Energy Agency	Fatih Birol	Executive Director
	International Labour Organization	Guy Ryder (virtually present)	Director-General
(International Monetary Fund)	International Monetary Fund	Kristalina Georgieva	managing director
	OECD	Mathias Cormann	Secretary-General
(United Nations)	United Nations	António Guterres (virtually present)	Secretary-General
	World Bank	David Malpass	President
(World Health Organization)	World Health Organization	Tedros Adhanom Ghebreyesus	Director-General
(World Trade Organization)	World Trade Organization	Ngozi Okonjo-Iweala	Director-General

== Gallery of participating leaders ==
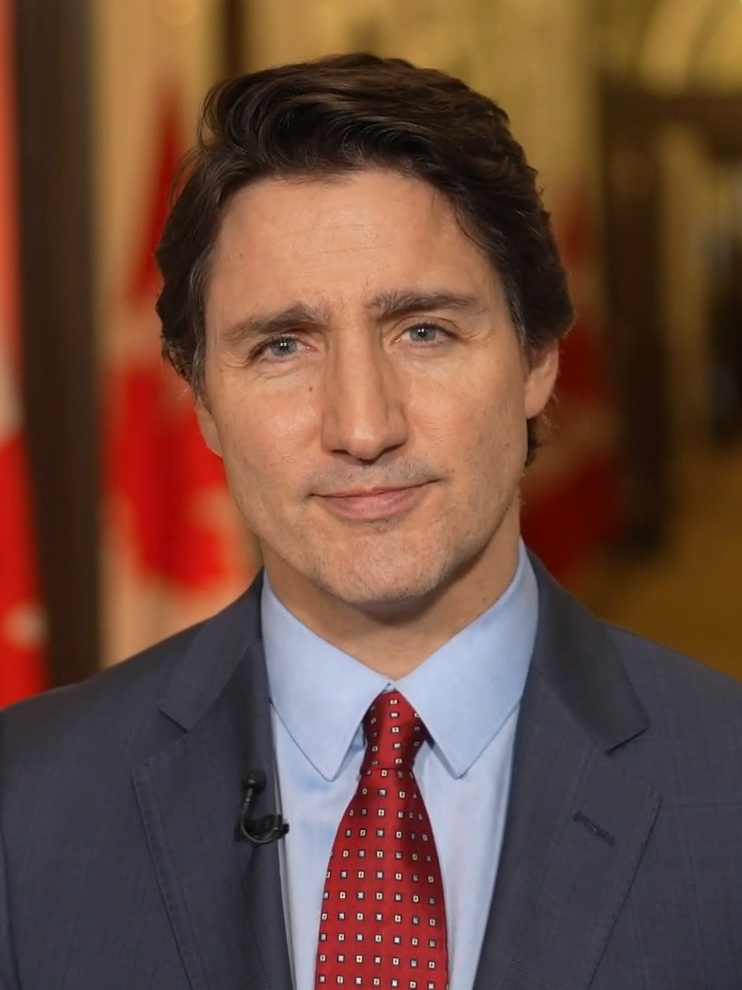
(Canada) Canada
Justin Trudeau,
Prime Minister

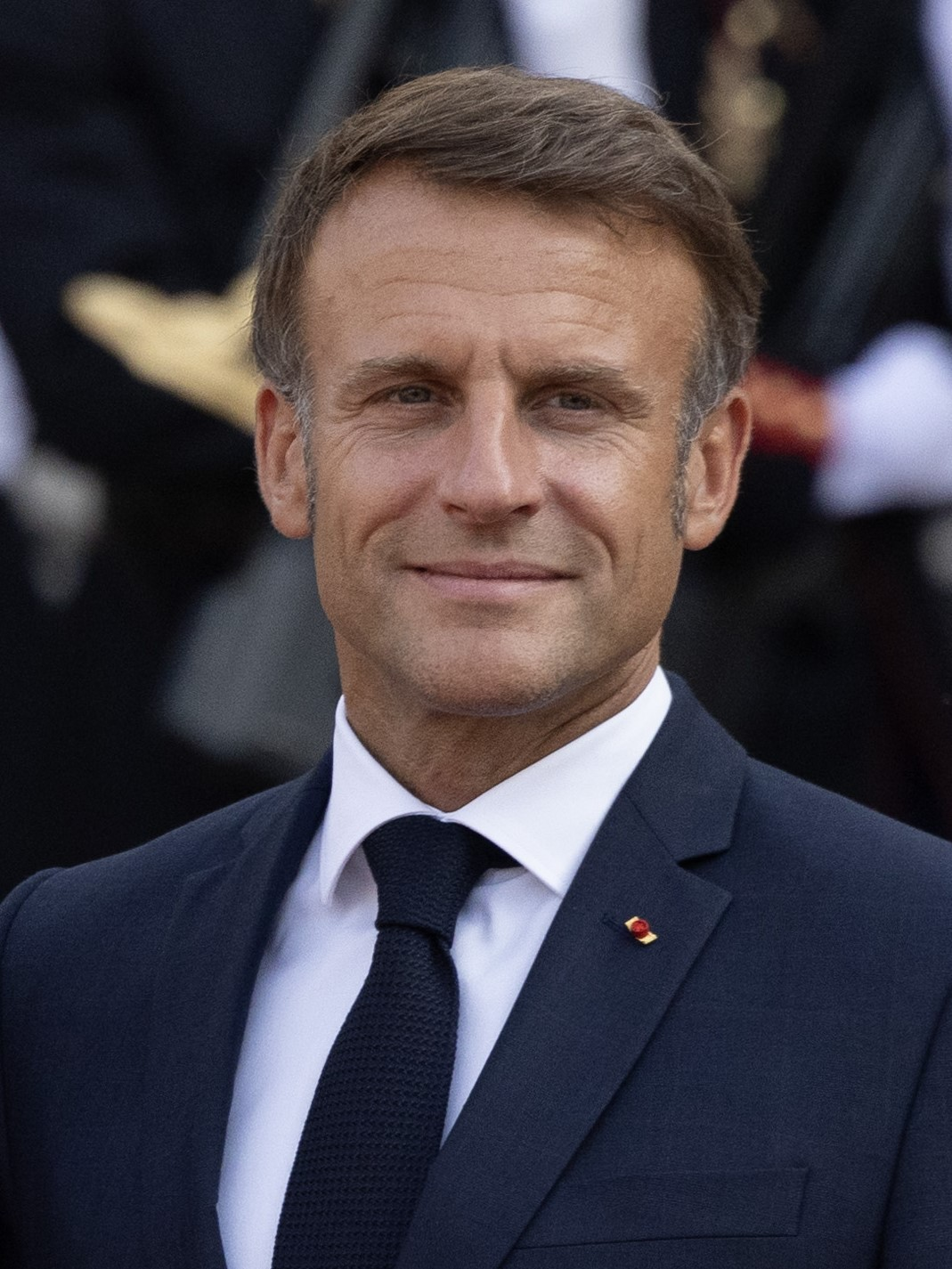
(France) France
Emmanuel Macron,
President

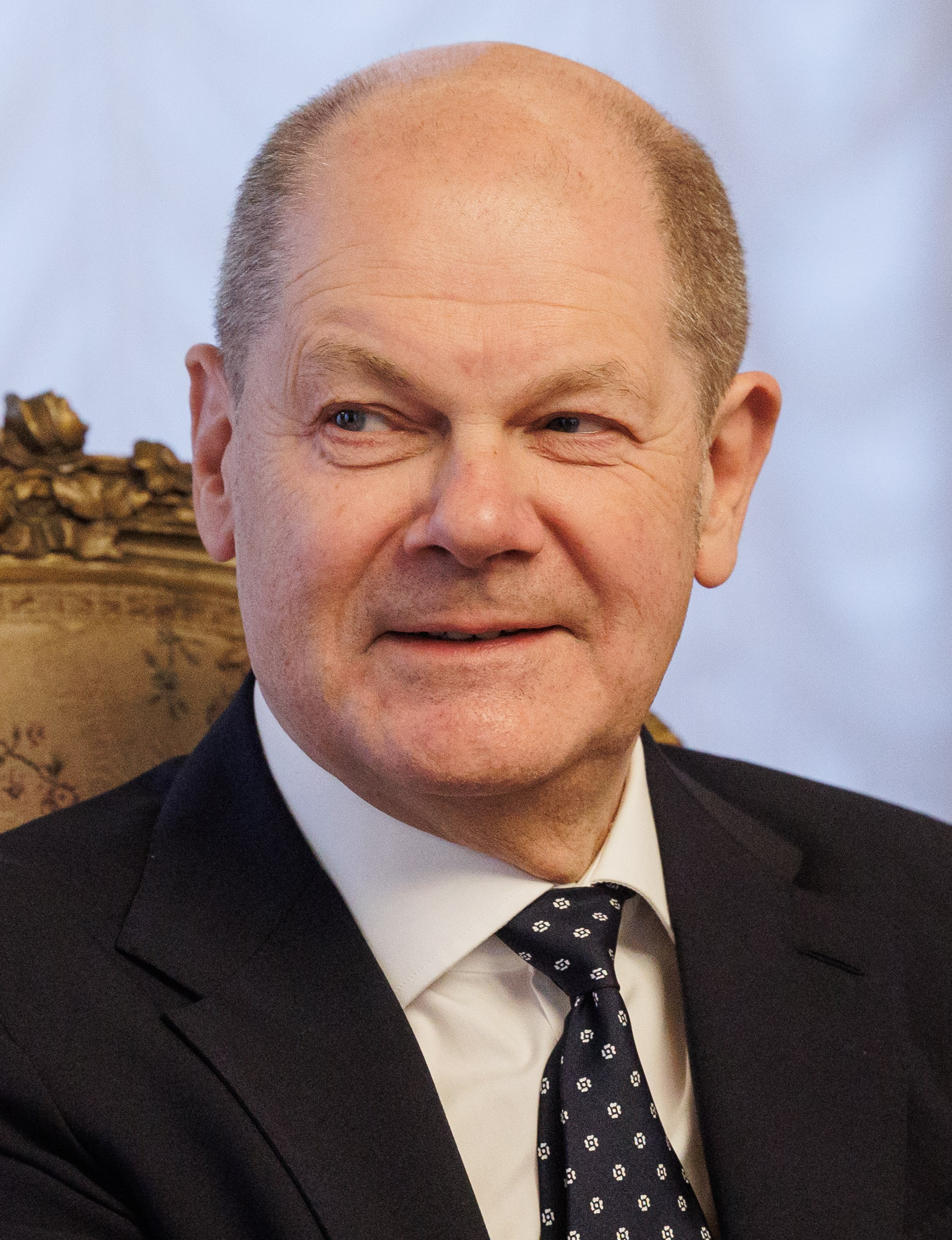
(Germany) Germany
Olaf Scholz,
Chancellor (Host)

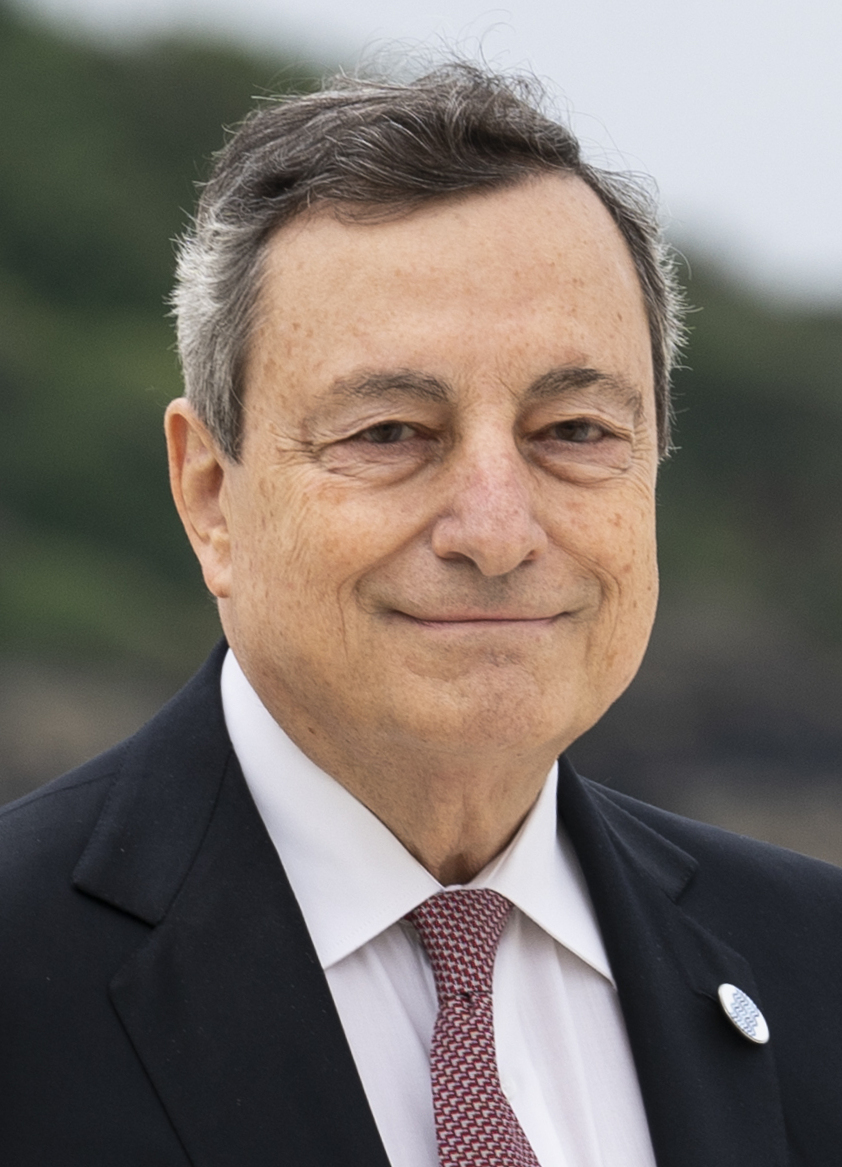
(Italy) Italy
Mario Draghi,
Prime Minister

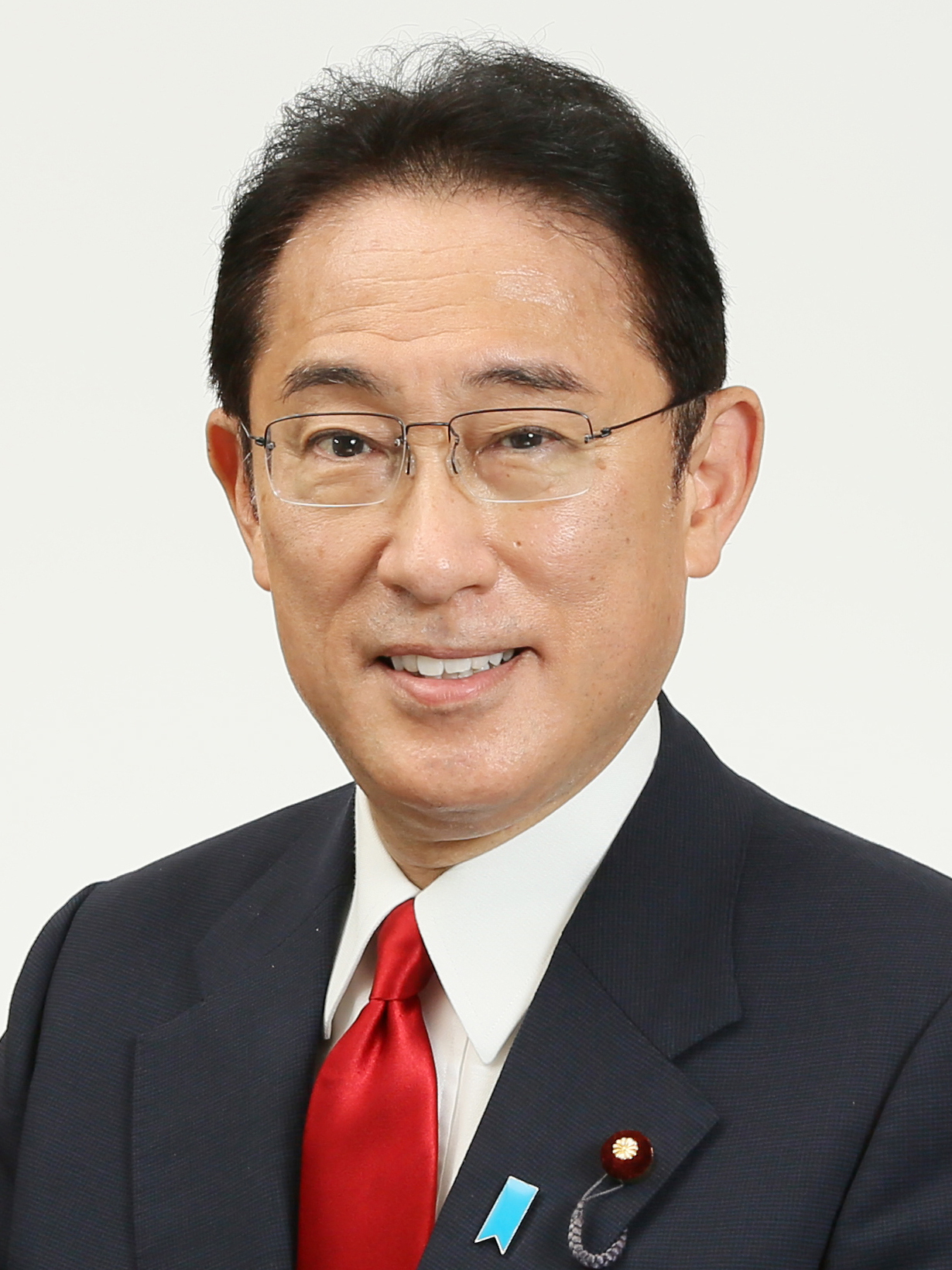
(Japan) Japan
Fumio Kishida,
Prime Minister

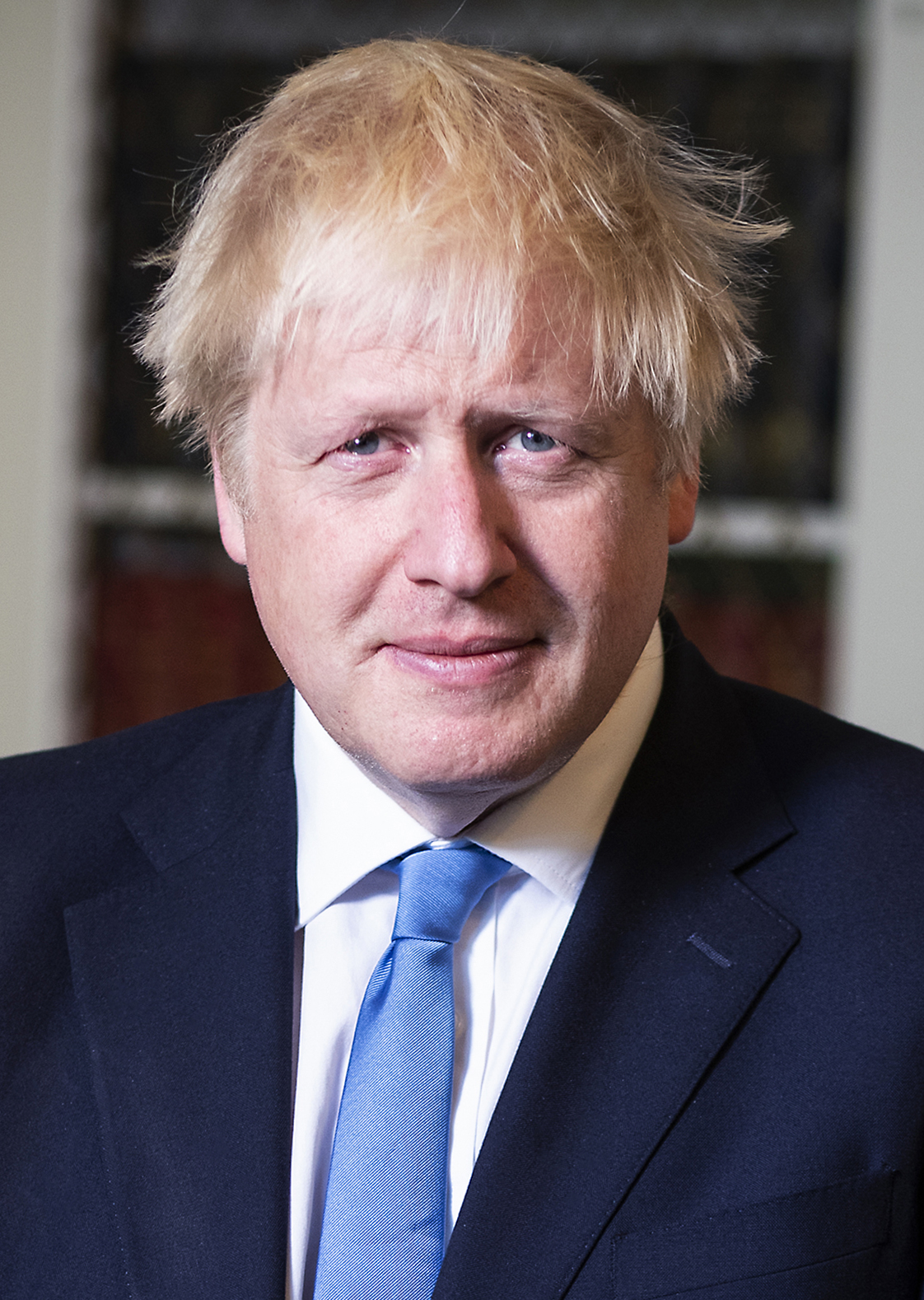
(United Kingdom) United Kingdom
Boris Johnson,
Prime Minister

(United States) United States
Joe Biden,
President
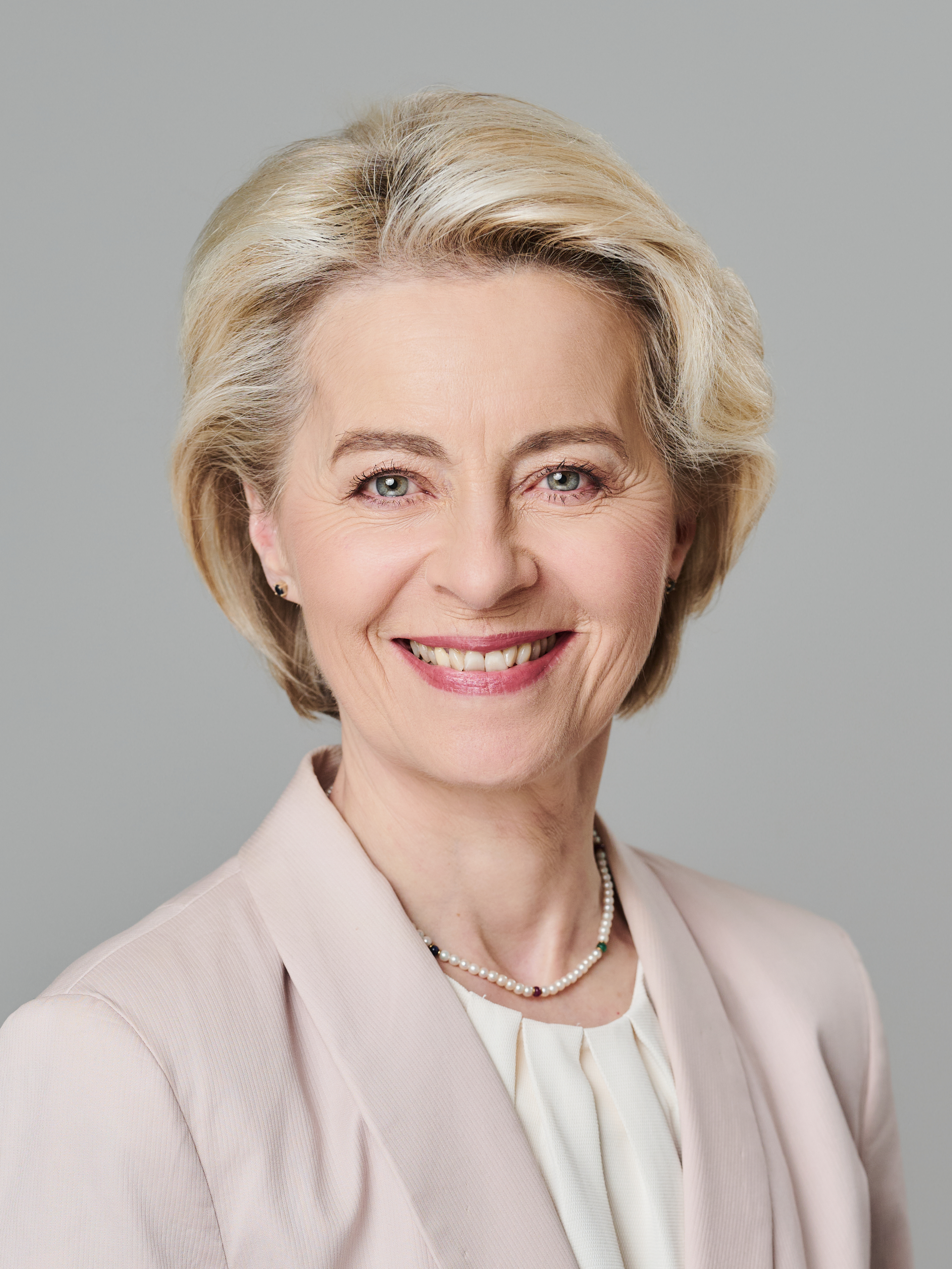
(European Union) European Union
Ursula von der Leyen,
President of the European Commission

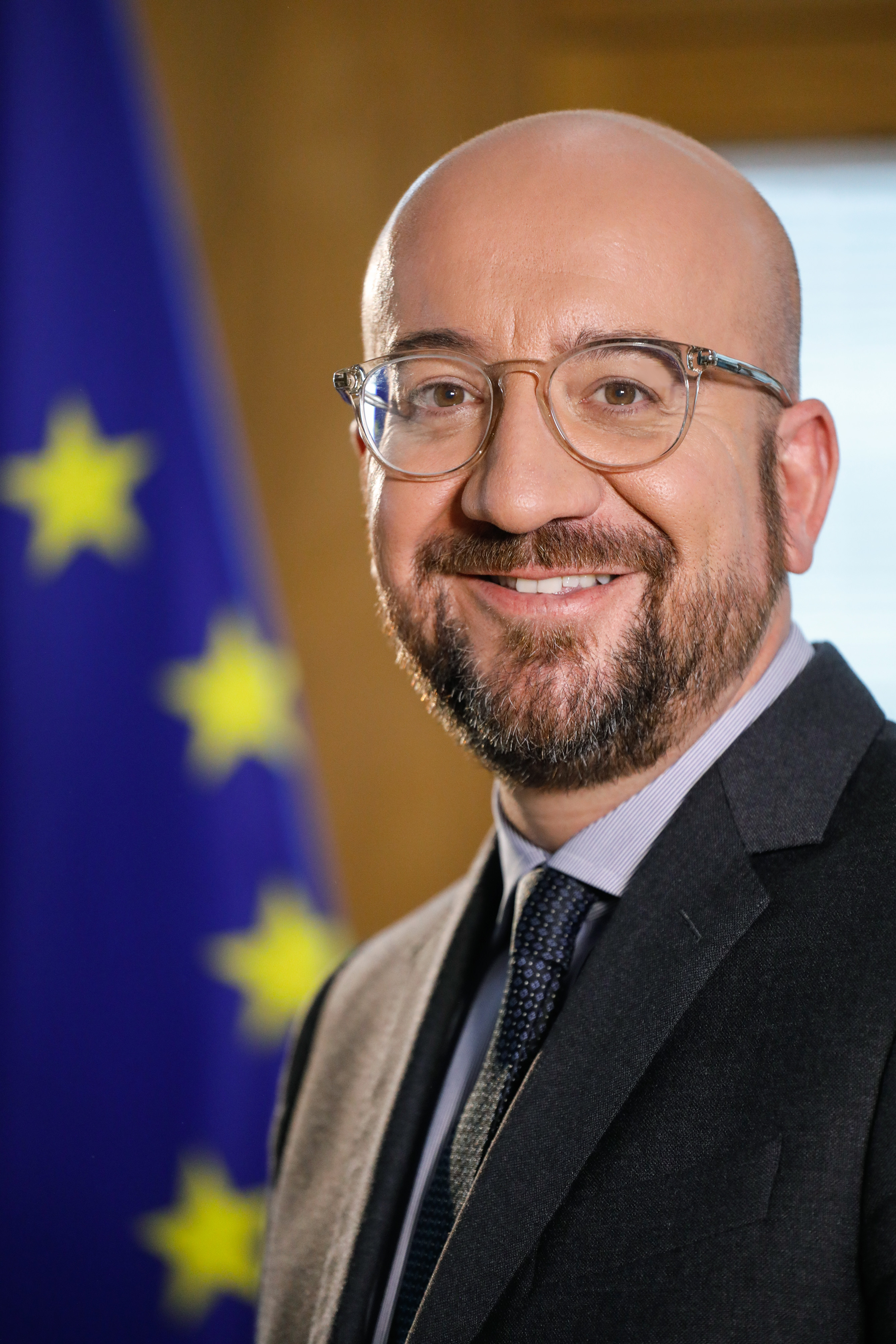
(European Union) European Union
Charles Michel,
President of the European Council

=== Invited leaders ===
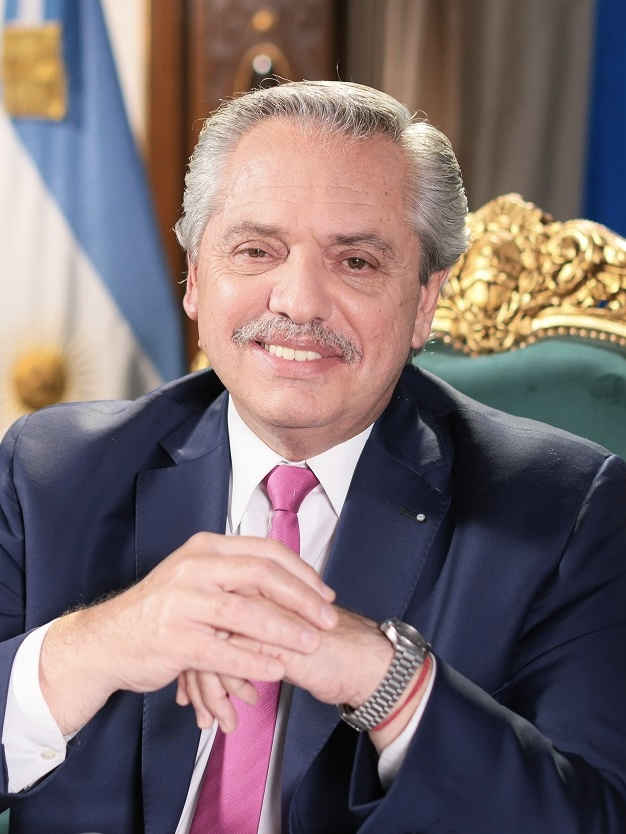
Argentina
Alberto Fernández, President

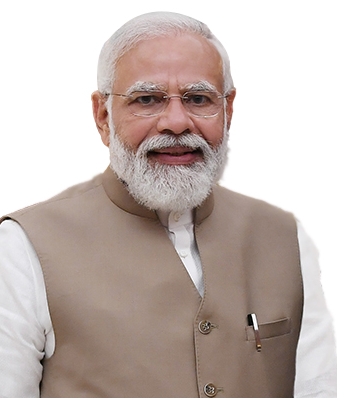
India
Narendra Modi, Prime Minister

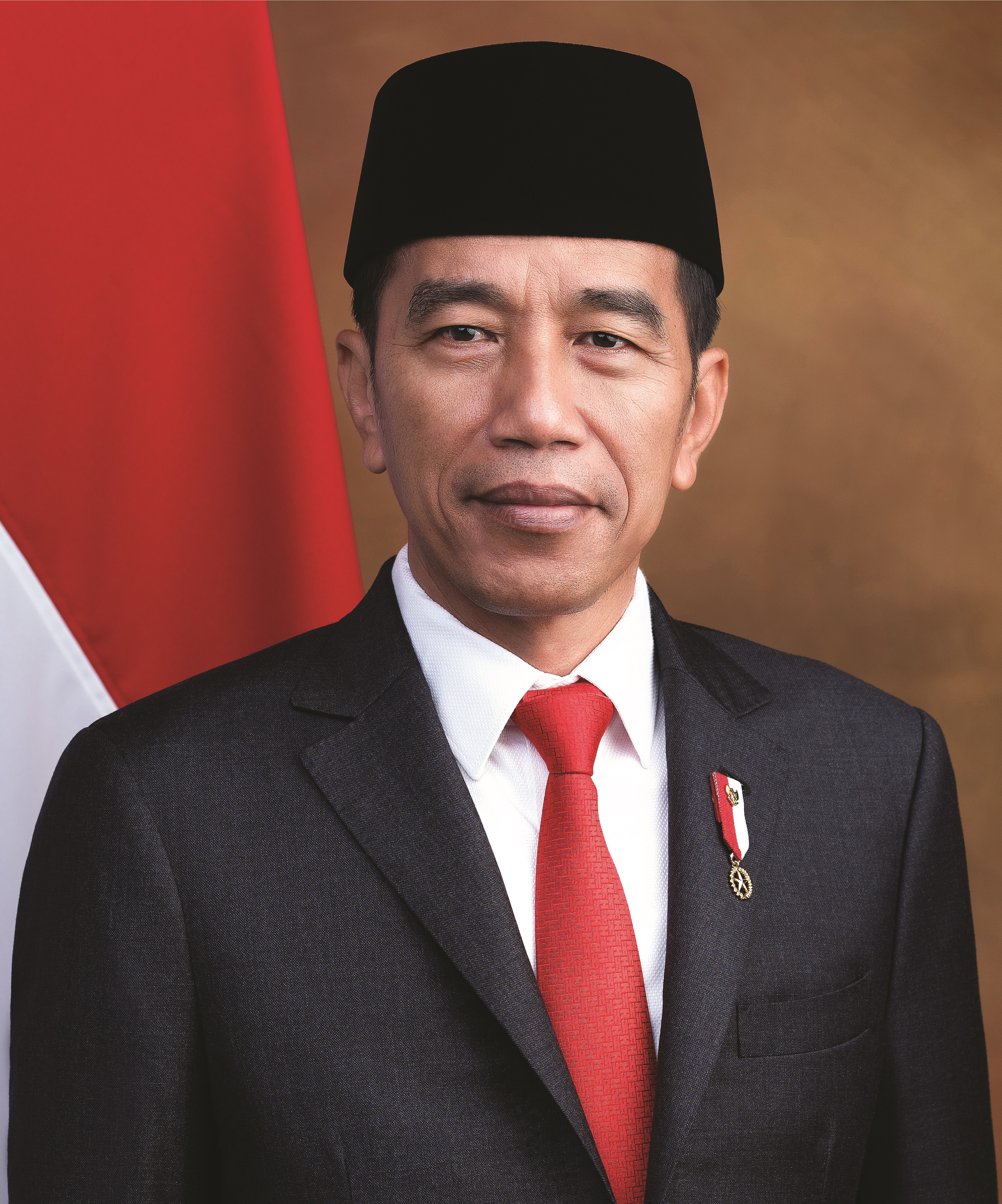
Indonesia
Joko Widodo, President

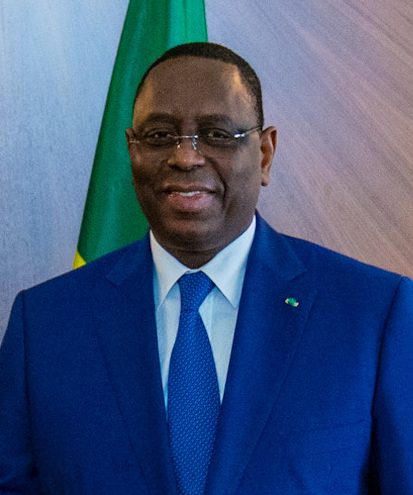
Senegal
Macky Sall, President

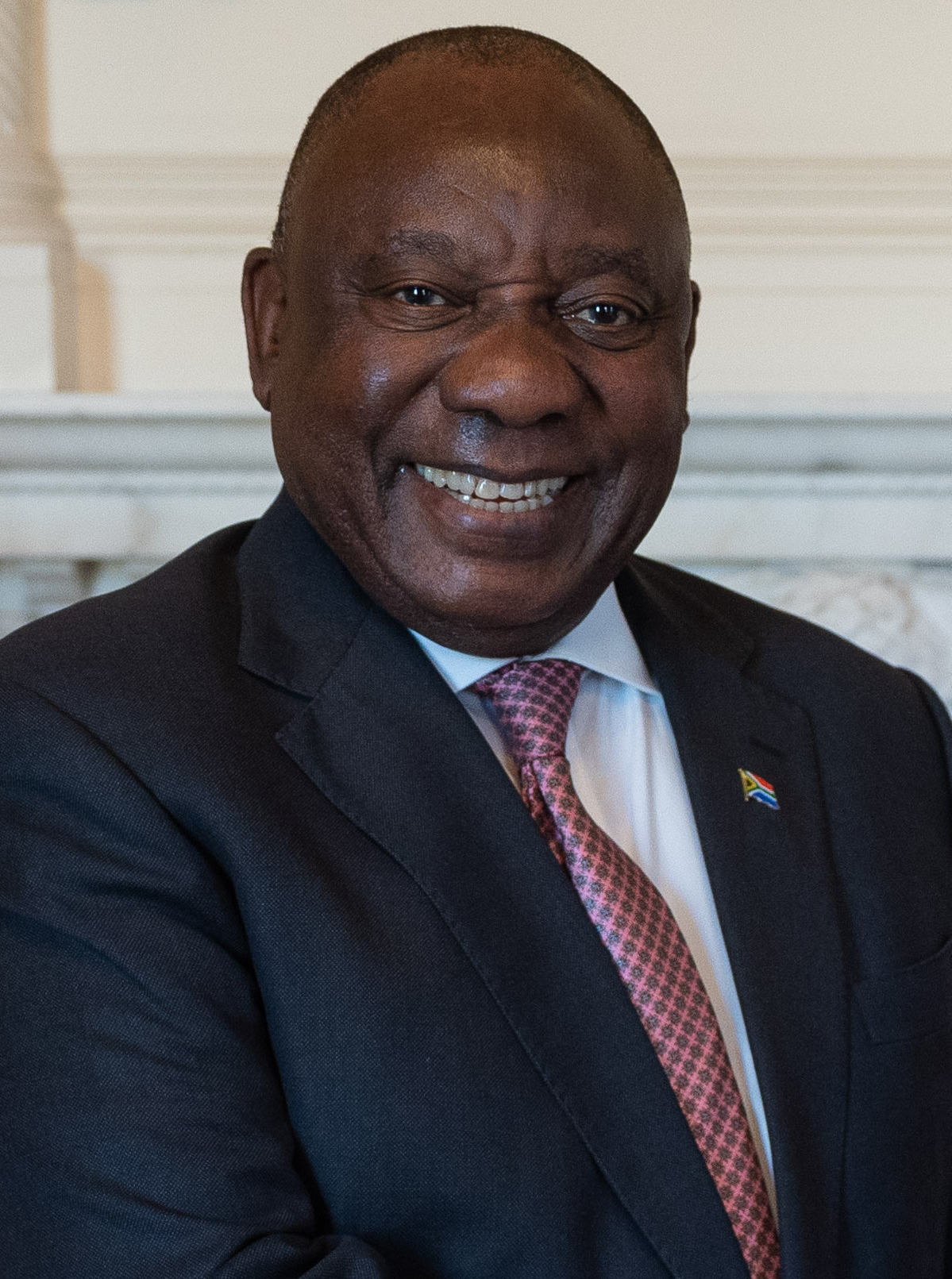
South Africa
Cyril Ramaphosa, President

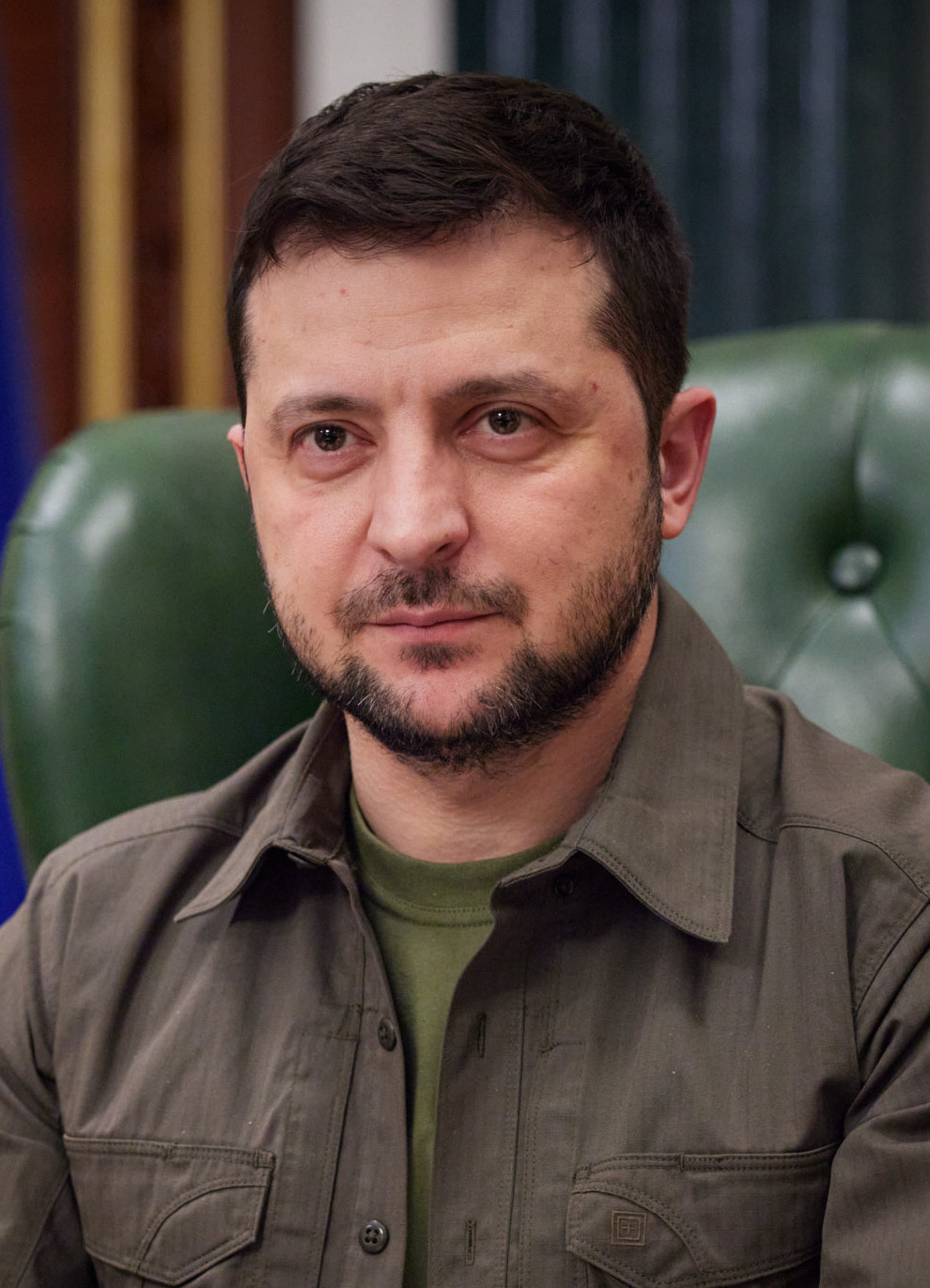
Ukraine
Volodymyr Zelenskyy, President

== Agenda ==
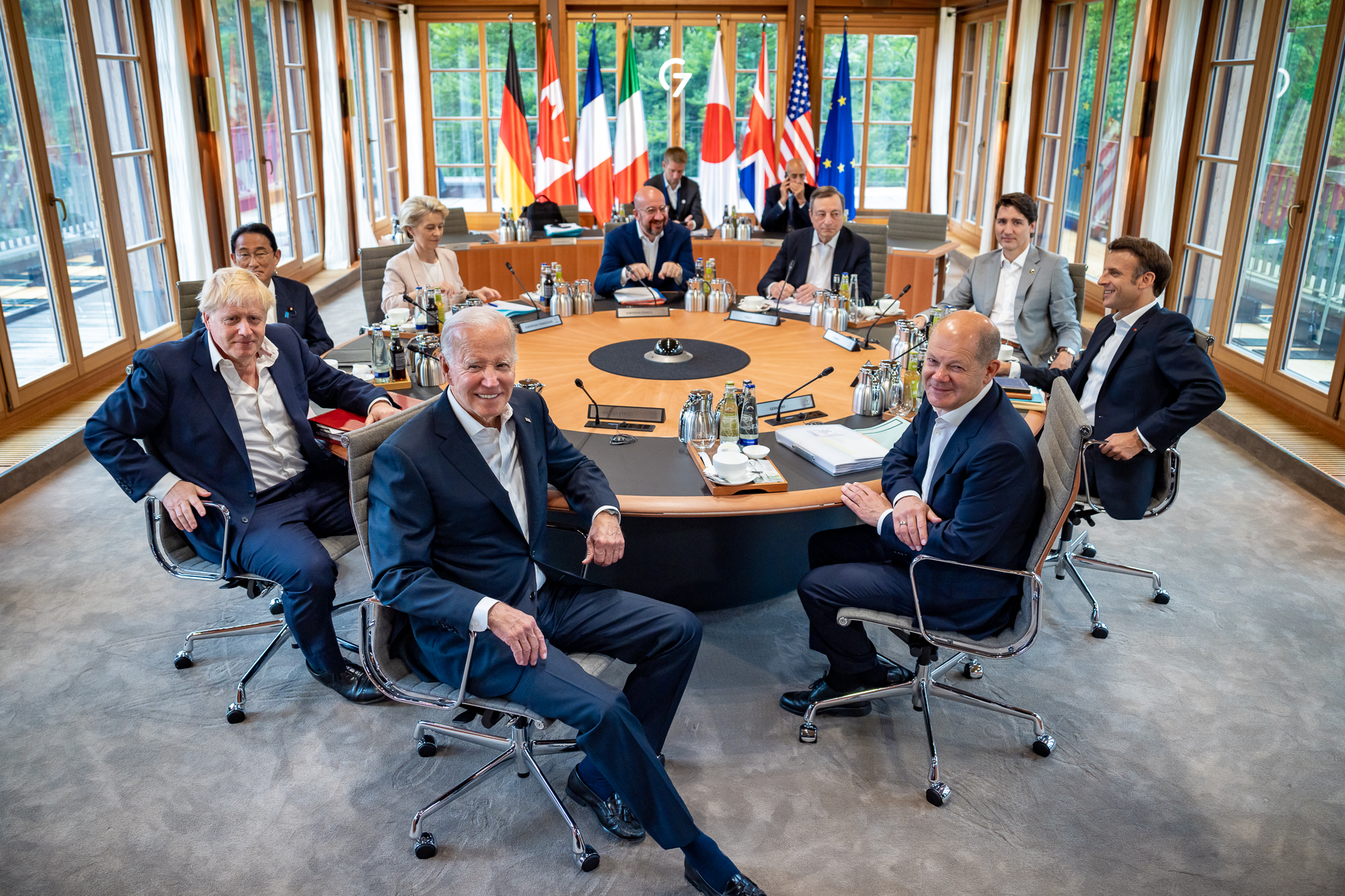
Working session on 28 June 2022

The following agenda items were discussed.

26 June 2022

- Global economy
- Partnerships for infrastructure and investment
- Foreign and security policy

27 June 2022

- With Ukrainian President Volodymyr Zelenskyy (virtual):
  A statement on support for Ukraine was issued.
- "Investing in a Better Future" on climate, energy and health with G7 partner countries and international organizations:
  The UK announced £25 million of aid backing for a new fund to ensure the world is better prepared to defeat future pandemics.
  G7 Chair's Summary on accelerating clean and just transition towards climate neutrality and the statement on climate club were issued.
- Global food security, gender equality with G7 partner countries and international organizations with the outreach guests:
  Japan prepared a plan to provide about 200 million dollars to help address a global food crisis amid Russia's ongoing invasion of Ukraine.
  The statement on global food security was issued.

28 June 2022

- Multilateral and digital order
- Preparing for the 2022 G20 Bali summit

A G7 Leaders' Communiqué was issued after the summit meetings.

In the wake of the 2022 Russian invasion of Ukraine, leaders at the summit ridiculed Putin's photo ops—particularly his manly, bare-chested photographs with airbrushed muscles—including Boris Johnson.

== Events leading to the summit ==
On 19 February 2022, a G7 Foreign Ministers' Meeting was held with the participation of the Foreign Minister of Ukraine, and issued a statement on Russia and Ukraine.

In March 2022, foreign ministers from G7 agreed to impose tougher sanctions on Russia if it does not stop its assault on Ukraine, and demanded in particular that Moscow halt attacks in the vicinity of nuclear power plants. German Chancellor Olaf Scholz invited leaders from the G7 to a summit on 24 March 2022 in Brussels, Belgium. The meeting was embedded in the NATO summit and the European Council. World leaders warned that if Russia were to use chemical or nuclear weapons they would be forced to respond.

On 7 April 2022, G7 Foreign Ministers' meeting was held in Brussels to discuss about the situation of Ukraine, and issued their statement reaffirming that they will take additional measures against Russia until the country stops its invasion of Ukraine. On the day, leaders of the Group of Seven also issued a statement amid growing calls for Russia to be held accountable for the civilian killings. And on 19 April 2022, the leaders met and discussed at a videoconference about their coordinated efforts to impose severe economic costs to hold Russia accountable.

On 8 May 2022, the leaders discussed at a videoconference, and issued a joint statement saying that they will reinforce Russia's economic isolation. After meeting virtually with Ukrainian President Volodymyr Zelenskyy, they committed to phasing out dependency on Russian energy. And on 9 May 2022, the G7 foreign ministers and the High Representative of the EU gave a statement on the selection process for the 2022 Hong Kong Chief Executive election. On 14 May 2022, they issued another statement on Russia's war against Ukraine, and pressed China to put real pressure on Russia.

== After the summit ==
In September 2022, the leaders of G7 condemned the "sham" Russian referendums being carried out in occupied Ukraine as a "phony" pretext to illegally grab territory. On 11 October 2022, after Russia's missile strikes in Ukraine, the leaders of the G7 held an online meeting with Ukrainian President Volodymyr Zelenskyy, and issued a statement on Ukraine. On 16 November, after the then assumed Russian rockets hit Poland (later proven to be Ukrainian defense missiles) during the period of the 2022 G20 Bali summit, an emergency meeting of G7 and NATO was held. On 12 December, G7 leaders held a virtual meeting and issued a statement to focus on boosting Ukraine's air defense. Also, it was announced that G7 created an open, international climate club and invited interested countries that pursue ambitious climate policies to join it.

== See also ==
- 2022 Brussels extraordinary summit
- 2022 G20 Bali summit
- 2022 Madrid summit
- Partnership for Global Infrastructure and Investment (PGII)
