= Krün =

- Municipality
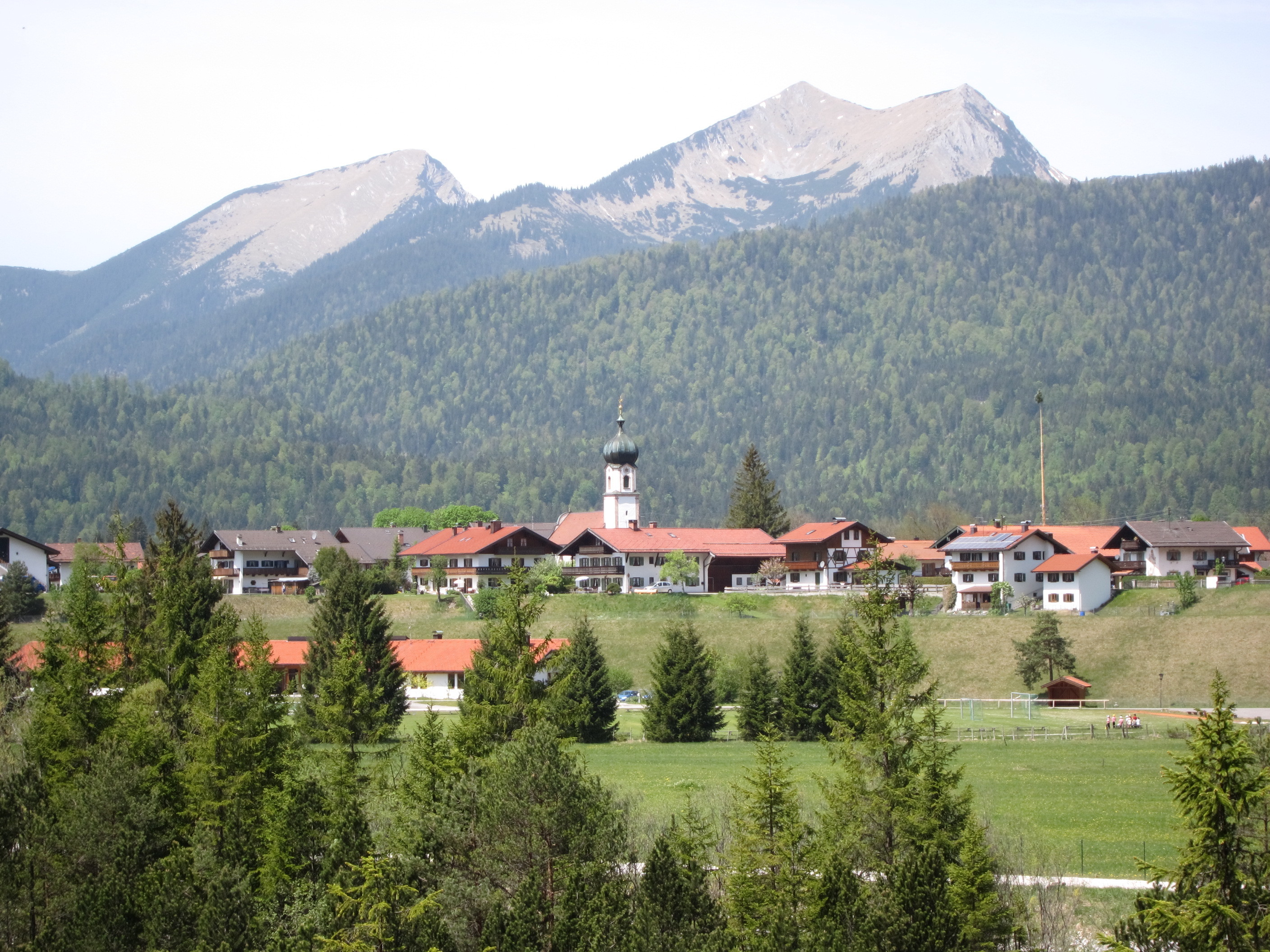
- Krün

- Coat of arms

- Location of Krün within Garmisch-Partenkirchen district
- Interactive map of Krün
- Location within Germany Location within Bavaria
- Coordinates: 47°30′N 11°17′E
- Country: Germany
- State: Bavaria
- Admin. region: Oberbayern
- District: Garmisch-Partenkirchen

Government
  - Mayor (2020–26): Thomas Schwarzenberger (CSU)

Area
  - Total: 36.32 km^{2} (14.02 sq mi)
- Elevation: 875 m (2,871 ft)

Population (2025-12-31)
  - Total: 2,069
  - Density: 56.97/km^{2} (147.5/sq mi)
- Time zone: UTC+01:00 (CET)
  - Summer (DST): UTC+02:00 (CEST)
- Postal codes: 82494
- Dialling codes: 08825
- Vehicle registration: GAP
- Website: www.kruen.de

Krün is a municipality in the Upper Bavarian district of Garmisch-Partenkirchen. It belongs with district capital and cultural center Garmisch-Partenkirchen as well as other municipalities to the region Werdenfelser Land. A few kilometers south runs the German-Austrian border.

The village, together with Mittenwald and Wallgau, builds the tourism network Alpenwelt Karwendel who markets the holiday region throughout the year as a starting point for sports and recreational activities such as hiking and cross-country skiing.

In 2015, Krün was the host-community of the 41st G7 summit. It took place on 7 June and 8 June 2015 in Schloss Elmau, which belongs as a separate district to the municipality of Krün. On the occasion of the G7 summit US-President Barack Obama visited the village together with Chancellor Angela Merkel and her husband.

From June 26 to 28, 2022, Krün once again hosted the G7 Summit.

== Geography ==
Krün is located in the Upper Isar Valley, about 100 kilometres south of Munich and 15 kilometres east of Garmisch-Partenkirchen. It is located 6.2 kilometres north of Mittenwald and 2 kilometres south of Wallgau.

To the east, the Soiern Mountains rise with the Soiernspitze (2257 m above sea level. NN) and the local mountains Schöttlkarspitze (2050 m above sea level. NN), Seinskopf (1961 m above sea level. NN) and Signalkopf (1895 m above sea level. NN). In the southeast, above Mittenwald, the Karwendel Mountains extend. The Karwendel is also the eponym of the tourist region, with average heights of about 2300 m above sea level. NN . In the southwest, the Wettersteingebirge dominates the scenery. It locates the highest German mountain, the Zugspitze (2964 m above sea level. NN) and the distinctive Alpspitze (2628 m above sea level. NN). In the northwest, lying in the Estergebirge, is the highest point of the village, the mountain Klaffen (1829 m above sea level. NN).

East of Krün, the river Isar flows in a northerly direction at first. The crossover passage to the Walchensee and the corresponding hydroelectric plant runs through the town towards Wallgau.

== History ==
Krün was first mentioned in 1294 with two farmsteads belonging to the Benediktbeuern Abbey. In 1491, the monastery sold the village with now four farmsteads to the Bishopric of Freising. Since the Reichsdeputationshauptschluss, Krün was part of the Electorate of Bavaria. The village was part of the former County of Werdenfels until 1803. In the course of administrative reforms in the Kingdom of Bavaria, the contemporary municipality was formed.

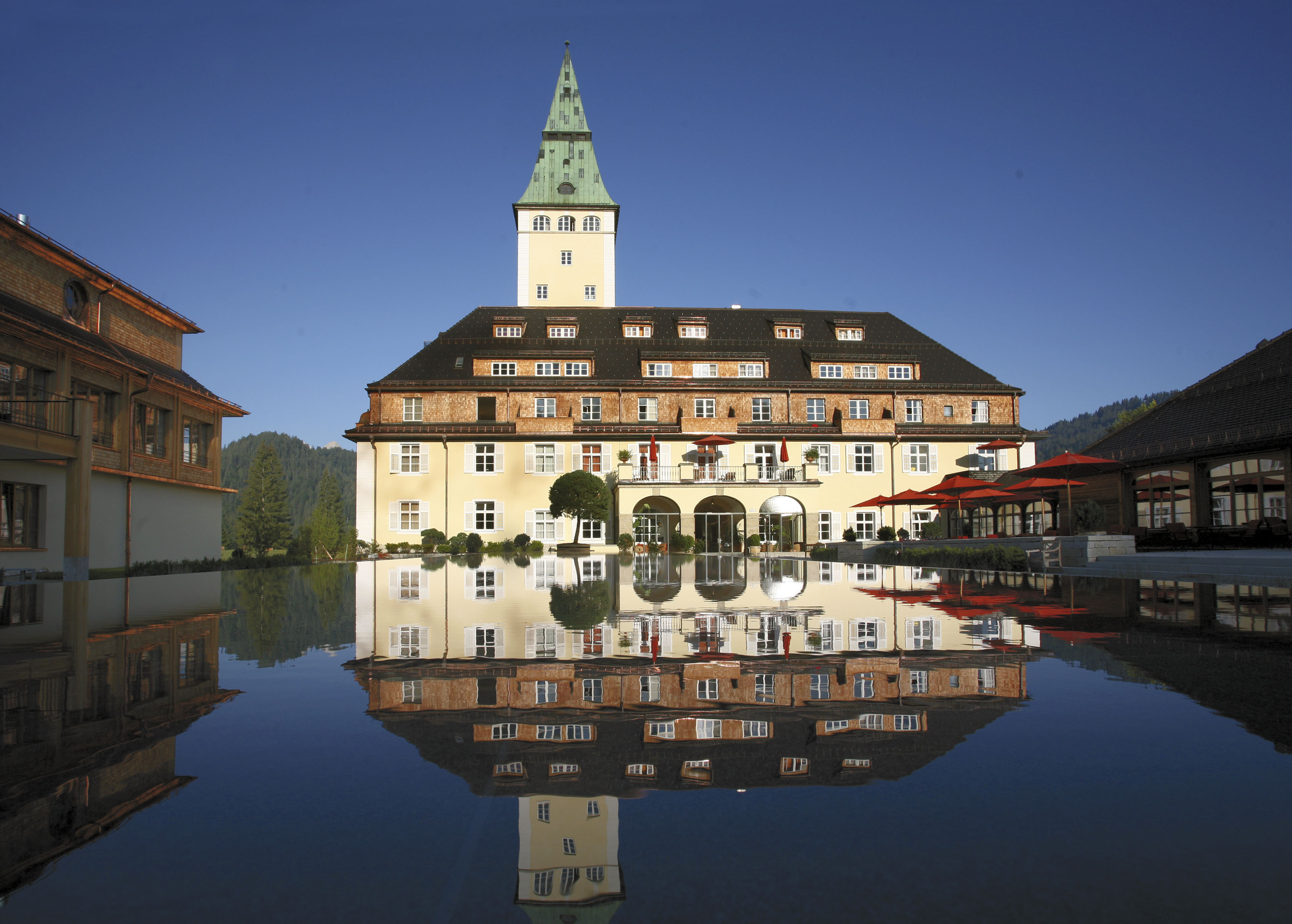
Summit site of the 2015 G7 summit: Schloss Elmau in Krün

== Coat of arms ==
A golden mitre with dependent tapes on a red ground with a silver pike pole and a silver crosier diagonally crossed. The colors red, gold and silver represent the two spiritual manors of the Convent Benediktbeuern (red / silver) and the Bishopric of Freising (red / gold) as well as the political affiliation of the former County of Werdenfels. The mitre also symbolizes the dominion of Freising, the crosier the dominion of Benediktbeuren. The pike pole documents the importance of timber rafting for the village and its economic development during the past centuries.

== Economy and Infrastructure ==
As in the whole region, tourism is the main industry in Krün. In 2013, 51 accommodation establishments offered 1,379 guest beds (including camping) and 365,983 overnight stays demonstrate the importance of tourism for the municipality. There were 120,326 more overnight stays in private houses in the same year.

=== Traffic ===
Krün is located on the German Alpine Road. The federal highway No. 11 runs in a northerly direction via Wallgau and Walchensee to Kochel am See.

The location is well served by public transport with both official bus routes and the rail network of the Deutsche Bahn.

The railroad from Munich to Innsbruck passes the municipal station in the village of Klais.

For holidaymakers there is also a bus network that can be used with the holiday region's guest card for free. The busses approach some hiking trails and alps in the summer and ski resorts and cross-country ski trails in the winter.

== Lakes ==
In the proximity of Krün there are several small lakes like Barmsee, Geroldsee, Grubsee and Tennsee. At the southern end of the village is an artificial lake of the river Isar. By here, a channel branches towards the Walchensee and so supplies the well-known Walchensee Hydroelectric Power Station.

== Tourist attractions and buildings ==
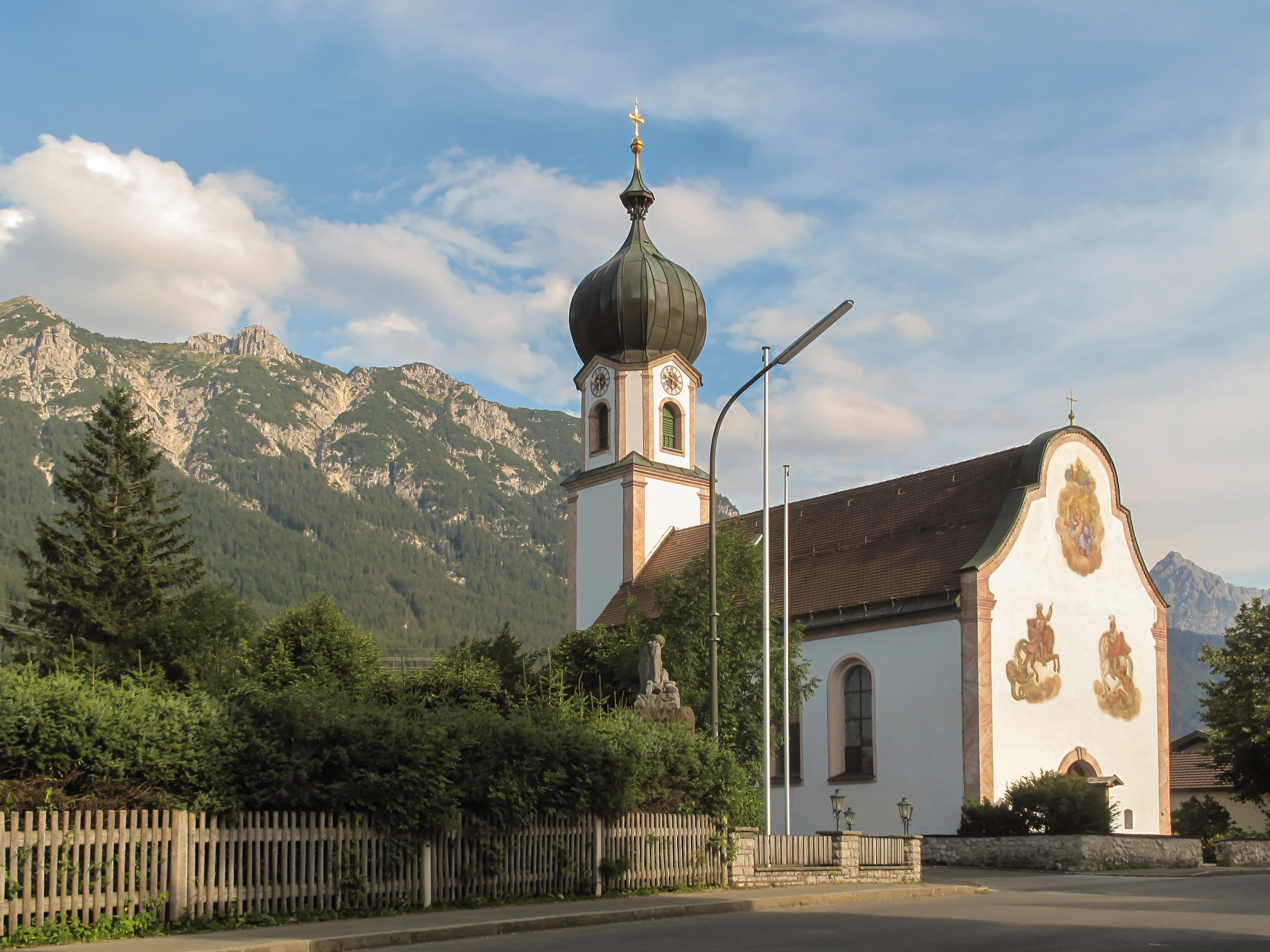
Krün, church: Sankt Sebastian Kirche

- Historic district of the village Klais
- Rococo-Church St. Sebastian in Krün (built in 1760)
- Chapel of Maria Rast
- Schloss Elmau (castle)
- Schloss Kranzbach (castle)
