= 41st G7 summit =

2015 international leader meeting in Germany

Coordinates: 47.462139°N 11.186571°E

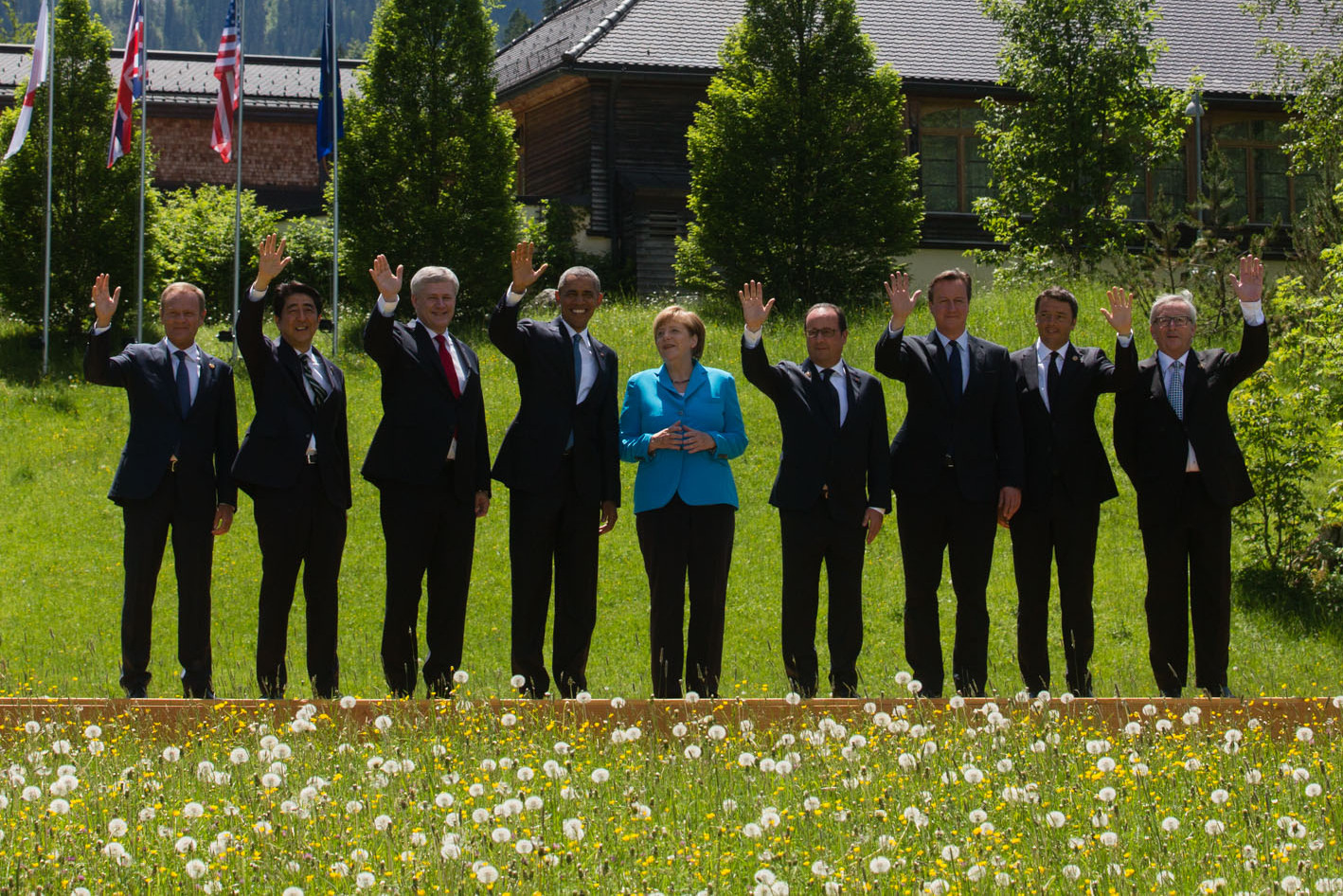
- Host country: Germany
- Date: 7–8 June 2015
- Cities: Krün
- Venues: Schloss Elmau
- Participants: Canada; France; Germany (host); Italy; Japan; United Kingdom; United States; European Union Invited guests: Ethiopia; Iraq; Liberia; Nigeria; Senegal; Tunisia
- Follows: 40th G7 summit
- Precedes: 42nd G7 summit

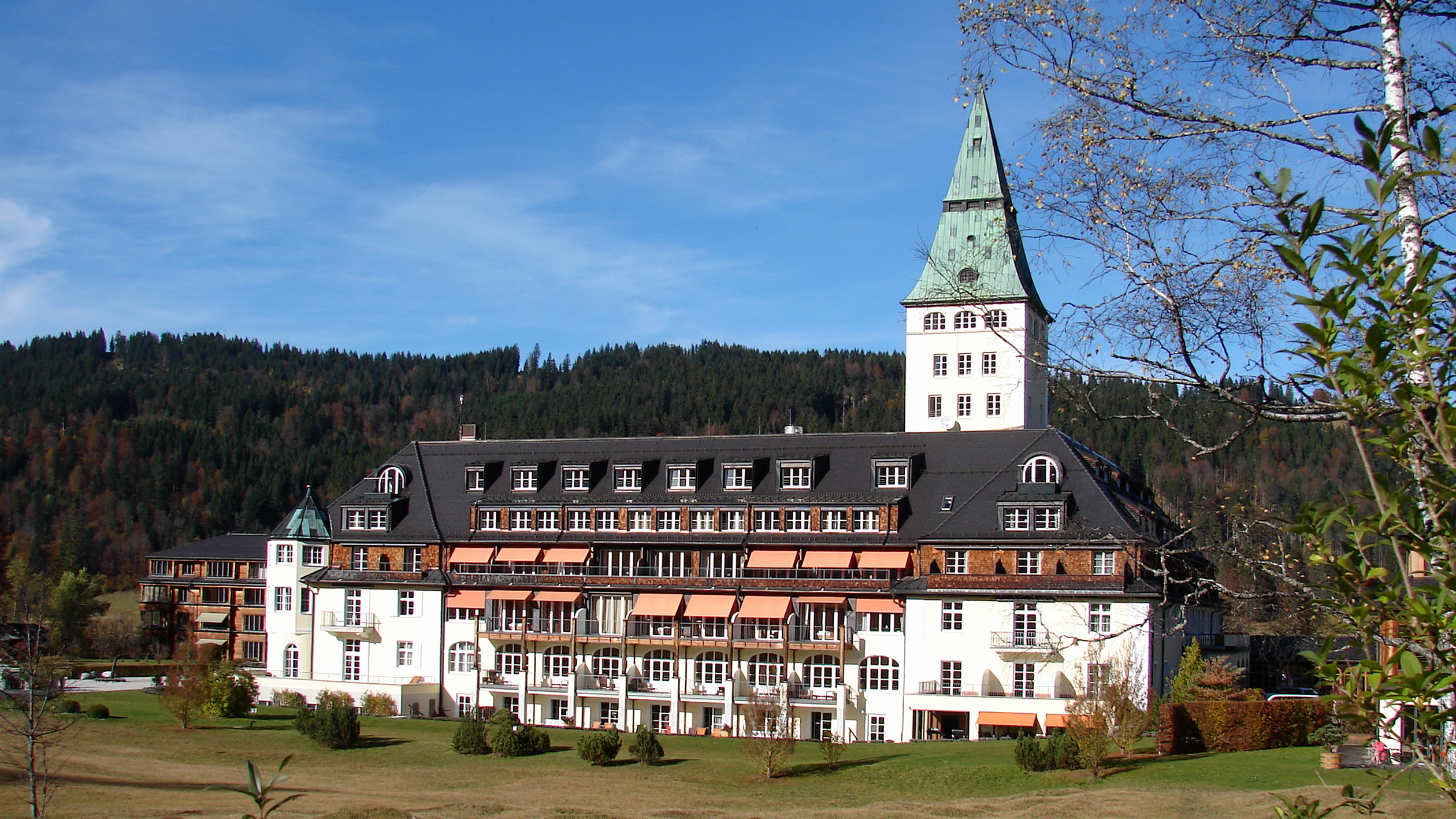
Schloss Elmau in the Bavarian Alps, location of the 2015 G7 summit

The 41st G7 summit was held in Schloss Elmau, Krün, Bavaria, Germany on 7–8 June 2015. In March 2014 the remaining members of the G8 declared that a meaningful discussion was currently not possible with Russia, and since then meetings have continued under the G7 name (not to be confused with the G7 meetings of finance ministers and central bank governors).

== Leaders at the summit ==
The attendees included the leaders of the seven currently active G7 member states, as well as representatives of the European Union. The President of the European Commission is a permanently welcome participant in all meetings and decision-making since 1981.

The 41st G7 summit was the last summit for Canadian Prime Minister Stephen Harper. It was also the first summit for Donald Tusk and Jean-Claude Juncker.

=== Participants ===
**Core G7 members** Host state and leader are shown in bold text.
Member		Represented by	Title
(Canada)	Canada	Stephen Harper	Prime Minister
(France)	France	François Hollande	President
(Germany)	**Germany**	**Angela Merkel**	**Chancellor**
(Italy)	Italy	Matteo Renzi	Prime Minister
(Japan)	Japan	Shinzō Abe	Prime Minister
(United Kingdom)	United Kingdom	David Cameron	Prime Minister
(United States)	United States	Barack Obama	President
(European Union)	European Union	Jean-Claude Juncker	Commission President
(European Union)	European Union	Donald Tusk	Council President
**Guest Invitees (Countries)**
Member		Represented by	Title
(Ethiopia)	Ethiopia	Hailemariam Desalegn	Prime Minister
(Iraq)	Iraq	Haider al-Abadi	Prime Minister
(Liberia)	Liberia	Ellen Johnson Sirleaf	President
(Nigeria)	Nigeria	Muhammadu Buhari	President
(Senegal)	Senegal	Macky Sall	President
(Tunisia)	Tunisia	Beji Caid Essebsi	President
**Guest Invitees (International Institutions)**
Member		Represented by	Title
	African Union	Nkosazana Dlamini-Zuma	Chairperson
	International Monetary Fund	Christine Lagarde	managing director
	OECD	José Ángel Gurría	Secretary-General
(United Nations)	United Nations	Ban Ki-moon	Secretary-General
	World Bank	Jim Yong Kim	President

== Agenda ==
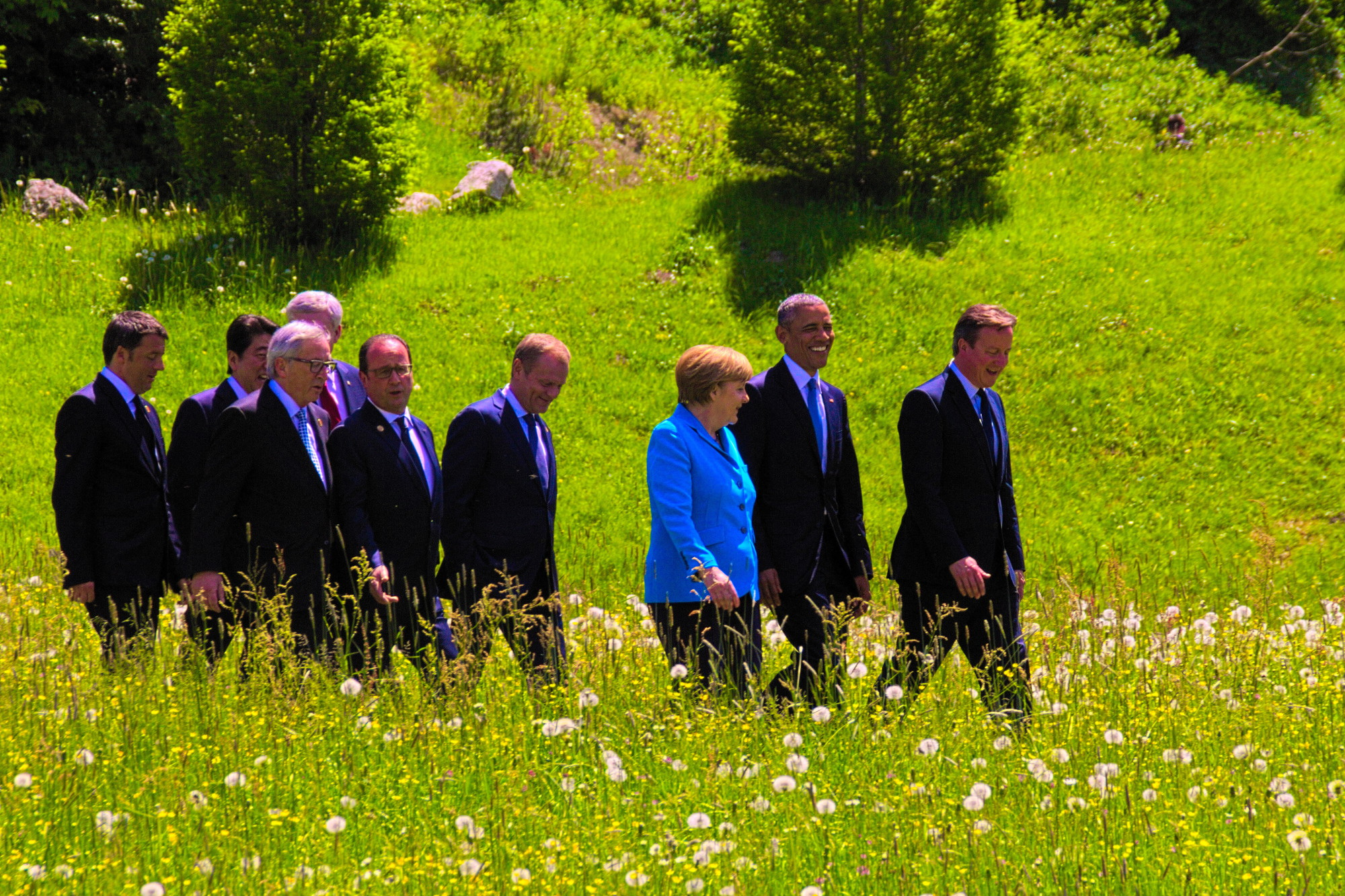
Leaders of the G7 walking to the family photo's moment

The German G7 presidency announced the following agenda:

=== Key topics for the summit ===
The G7 Summit 2015 in Schloss Elmau will focus on the global economy as well as on key issues regarding foreign, security and development policy. Additionally the UN conferences to be held in 2015 as well as the post-2015 agenda will be discussed.

Other key issues they will be addressing include

- Protection of the marine environment, marine governance and resource efficiency,
- Antibiotic resistance, Ebola, neglected and poverty-related diseases,
- Retail and supply chain standards, and
- Empowering self-employed women and women in vocational training.

The leaders of the G7 countries will also discuss energy security, including as part of the Rome G7 Energy Initiative. The G7 Energy Initiative for Energy Security was launched at a meeting of the energy ministers of the G7 countries held in Rome in May 2014, at which agreement was reached on more joint measures to boost energy security. The leaders of the G7 countries then approved the principles of and measures under the Rome G7 Energy Initiative at their summit in June 2014.

In addition, they will continue the ongoing G7 process in regard to development policy.

=== Foreign and security policy ===
On 15 April 2015, the Foreign Ministers included in their final communiqué a considerable amount of international crises and common challenges the international community is currently facing. Special attention was also paid to the issue of Climate and Security. The Ministers welcomed the external study "A New Climate for Peace: Taking Action on Climate and Fragility Risks", which "analyses the compound risks of climate change on fragile states and regions, identifies critical pathways through which climate change is likely to have significant interactions with the stability and fragility of states and societies, and recommends that G7 governments should align their efforts toward the common goal of increasing resilience and reducing fragility in the face of global climate change."

== Schedule of meetings ==
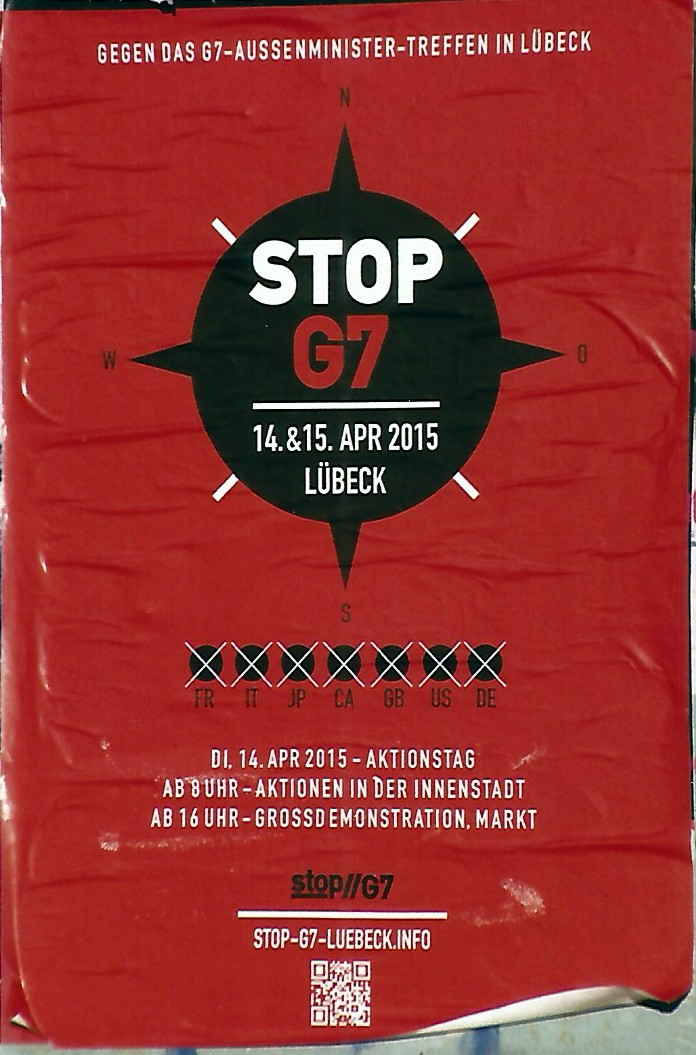
Anti-G7 summit protest sign

The following meetings of ministers were planned in the run-up to the summit in Schloss Elmau:

Date	Meeting	City	Venue(s)
14–15 April 2015	Meeting of foreign ministers	Lübeck	Lübeck City Hall, European Hansemuseum
11–12 May 2015	Meeting of energy ministers	Hamburg	Hamburg City Hall (Rathaus)
27–29 May 2015	Meeting of finance ministers	Dresden	Dresden Royal Palace, Taschenbergpalais
7–8 June 2015	G7 summit	Krün	Schloss Elmau
8–9 October 2015	Meeting of science ministers and Meeting of health ministers	Berlin	

== Gallery of participating leaders ==
=== Core G7 participants ===
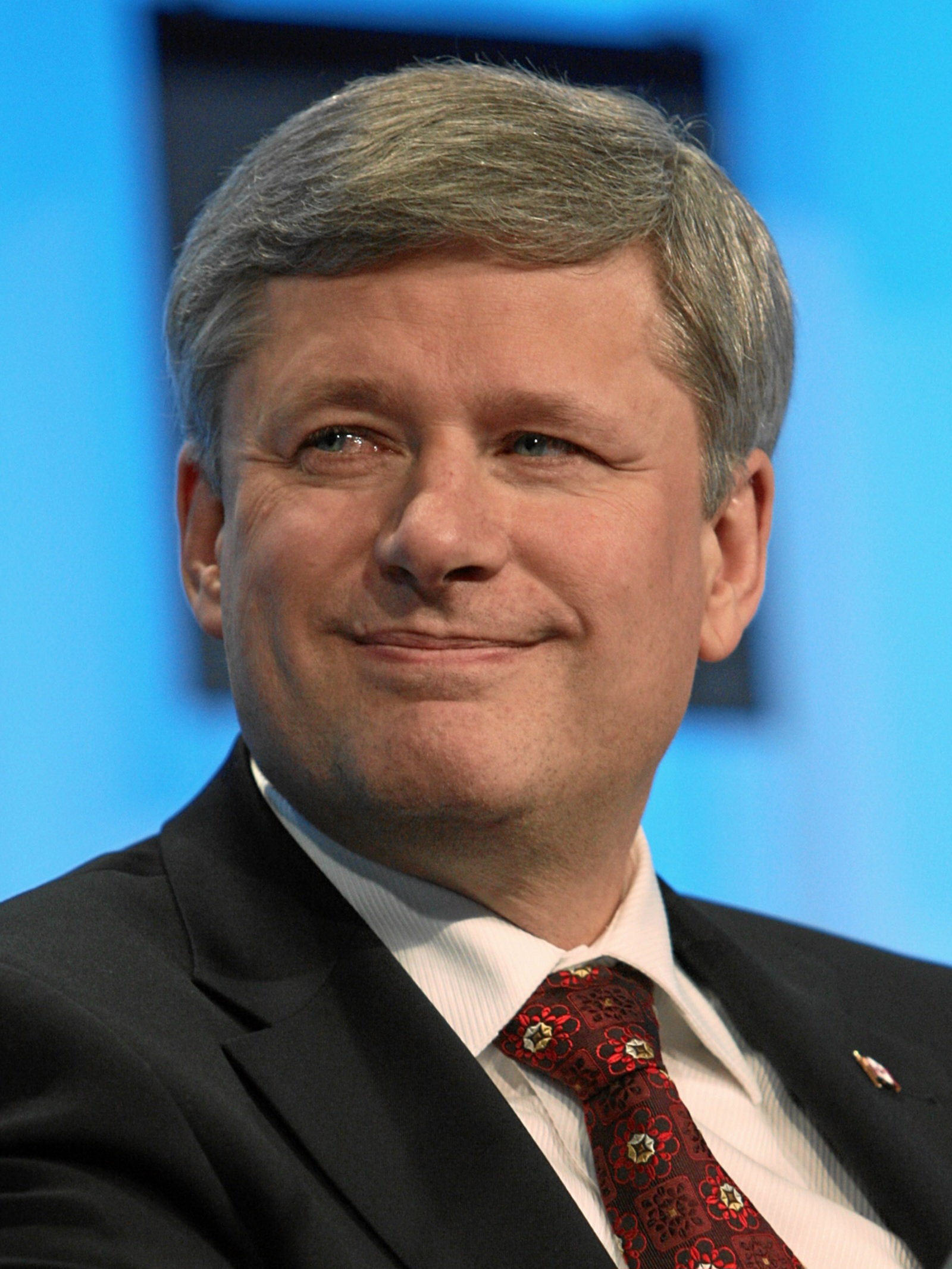
(Canada) Canada
Stephen Harper,
Prime Minister

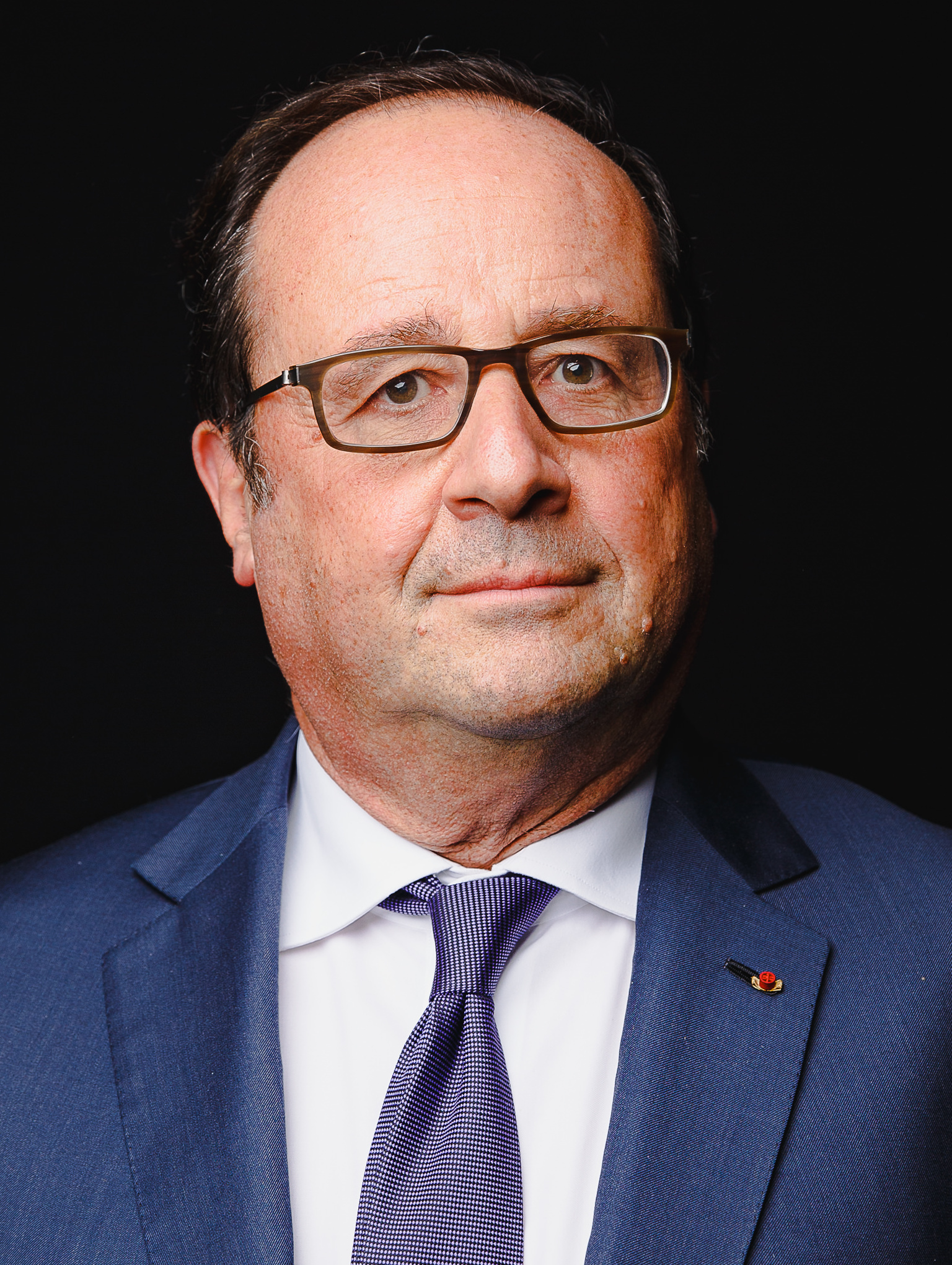
(France) France
François Hollande,
President

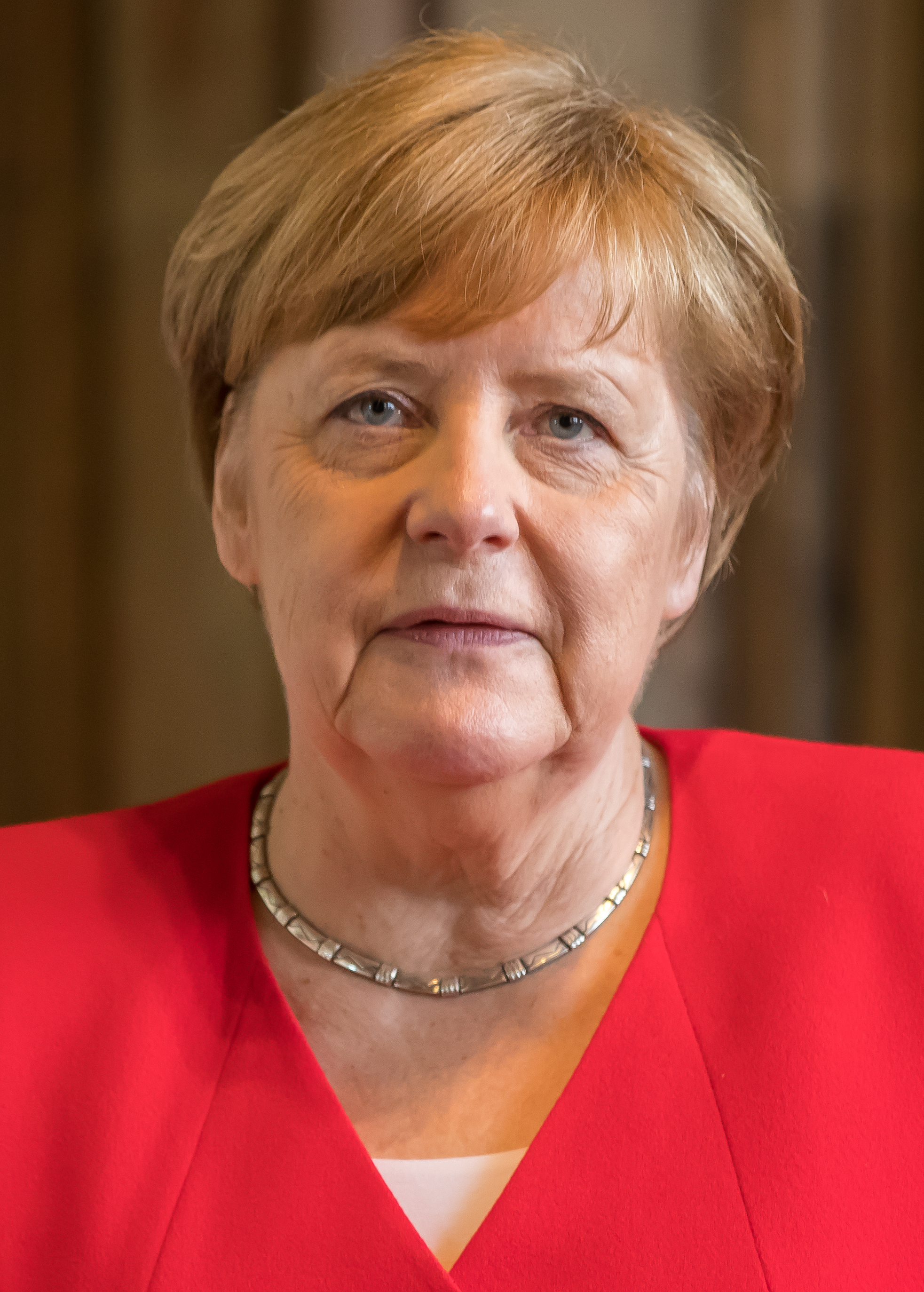
(Germany) Germany
Angela Merkel,
Chancellor (Host)

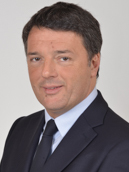
(Italy) Italy
Matteo Renzi,
Prime Minister

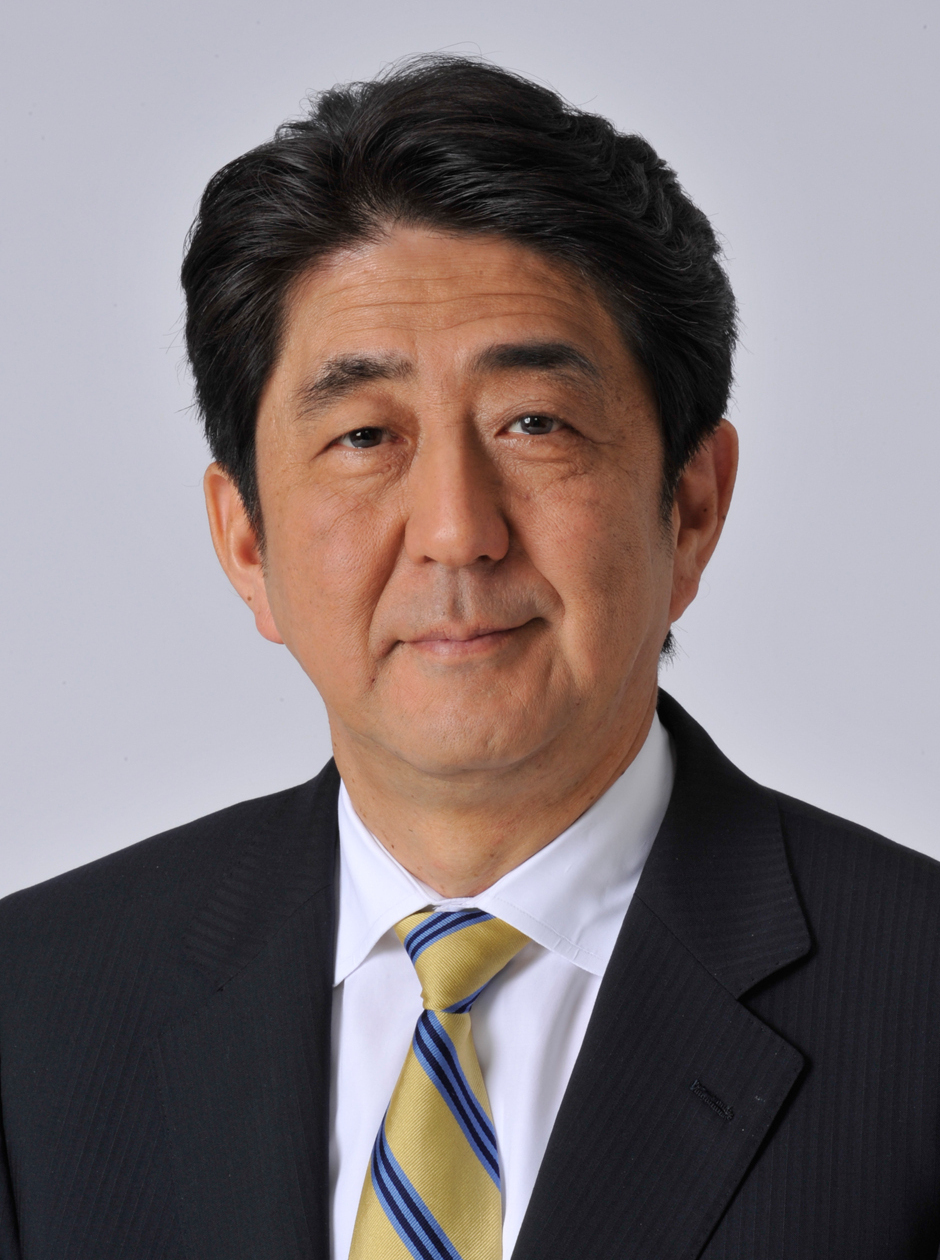
(Japan) Japan
Shinzō Abe,
Prime Minister

(United Kingdom) United Kingdom
David Cameron,
Prime Minister

(United States) United States
Barack Obama,
President
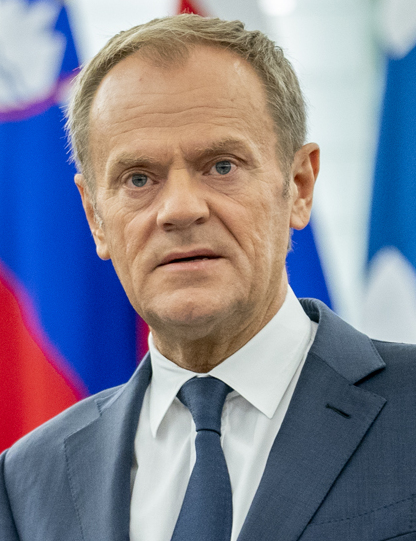
(European Union) European Union
Donald Tusk,
Council President

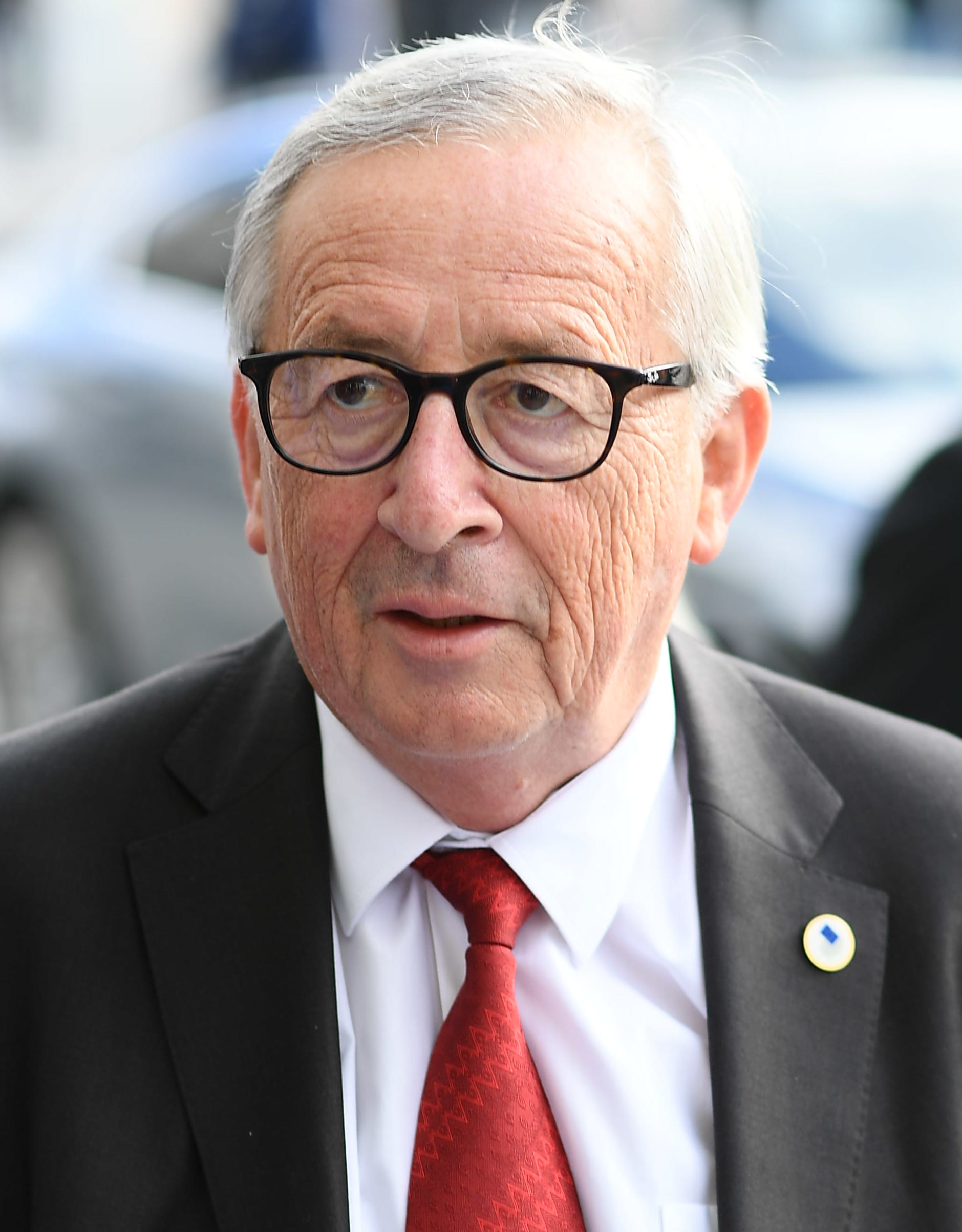
(European Union) European Union
Jean-Claude Juncker,
Commission President

=== Guest invitees (countries) ===
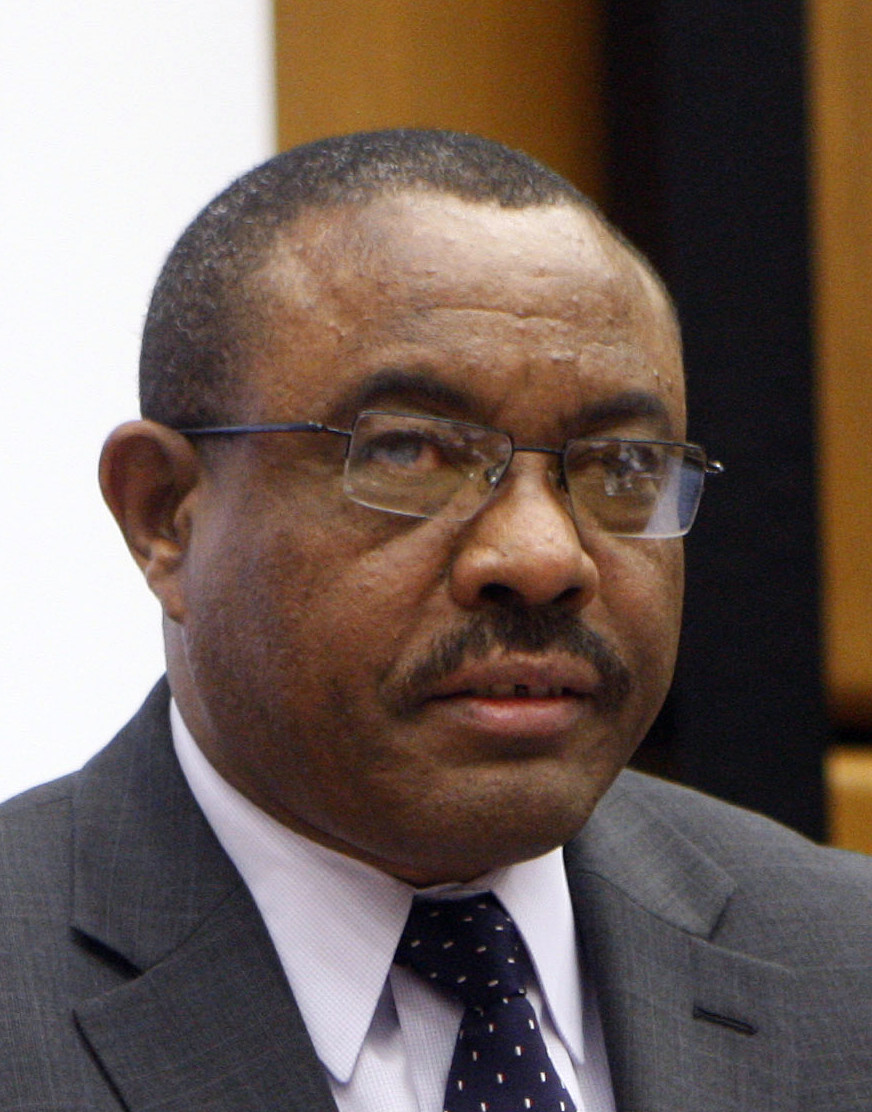
(Ethiopia) Ethiopia
Hailemariam Desalegn,
Prime Minister

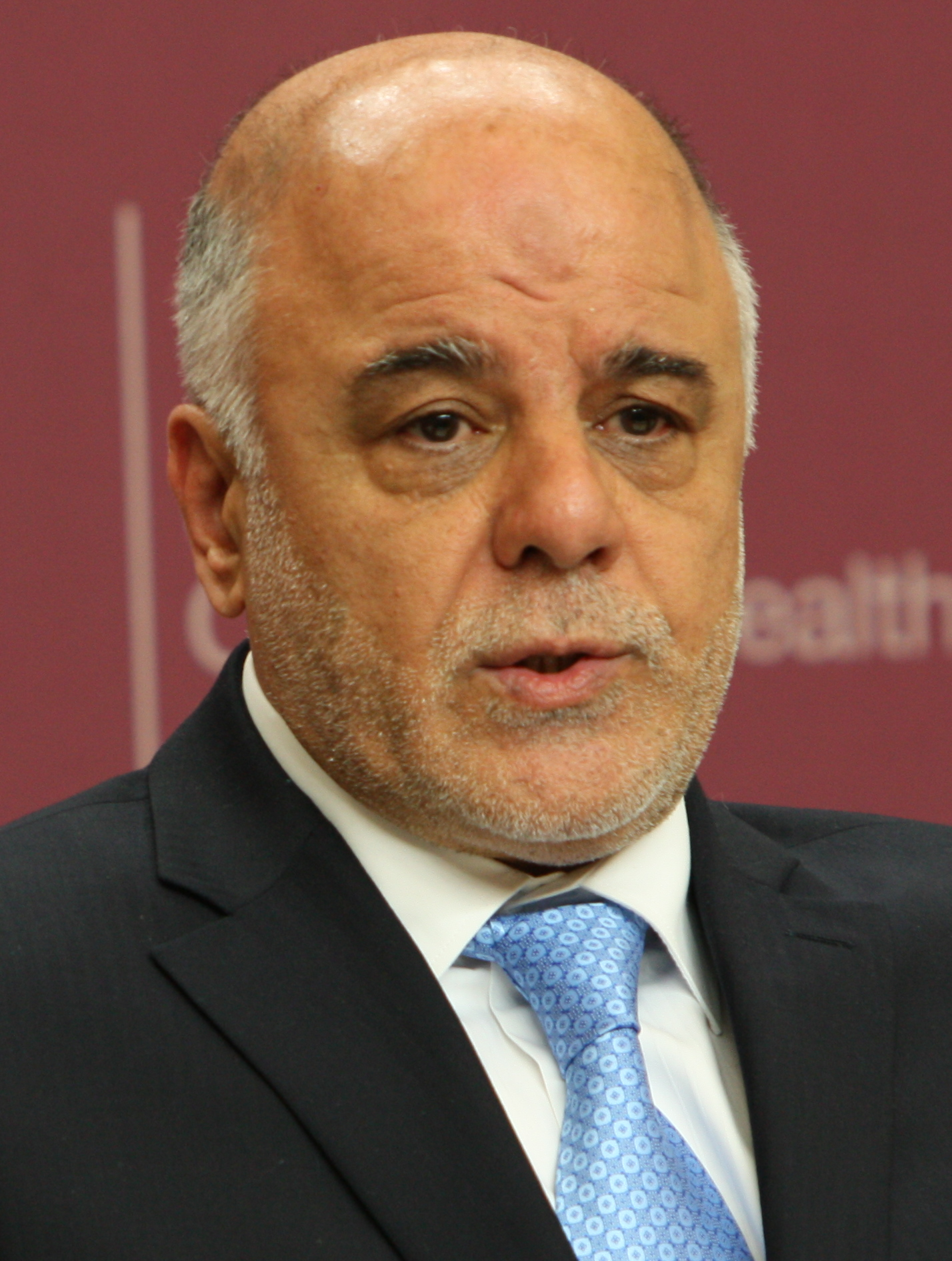
(Iraq) Iraq
Haider al-Abadi,
Prime Minister

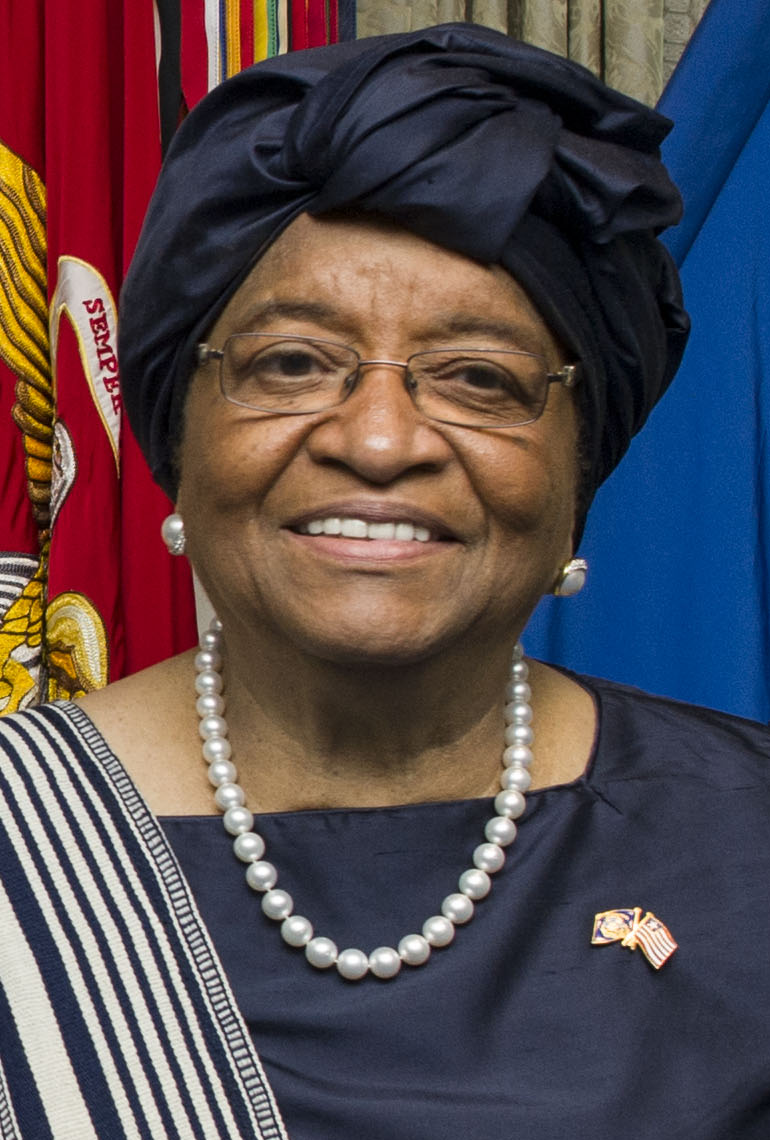
(Liberia) Liberia
Ellen Johnson Sirleaf,
President

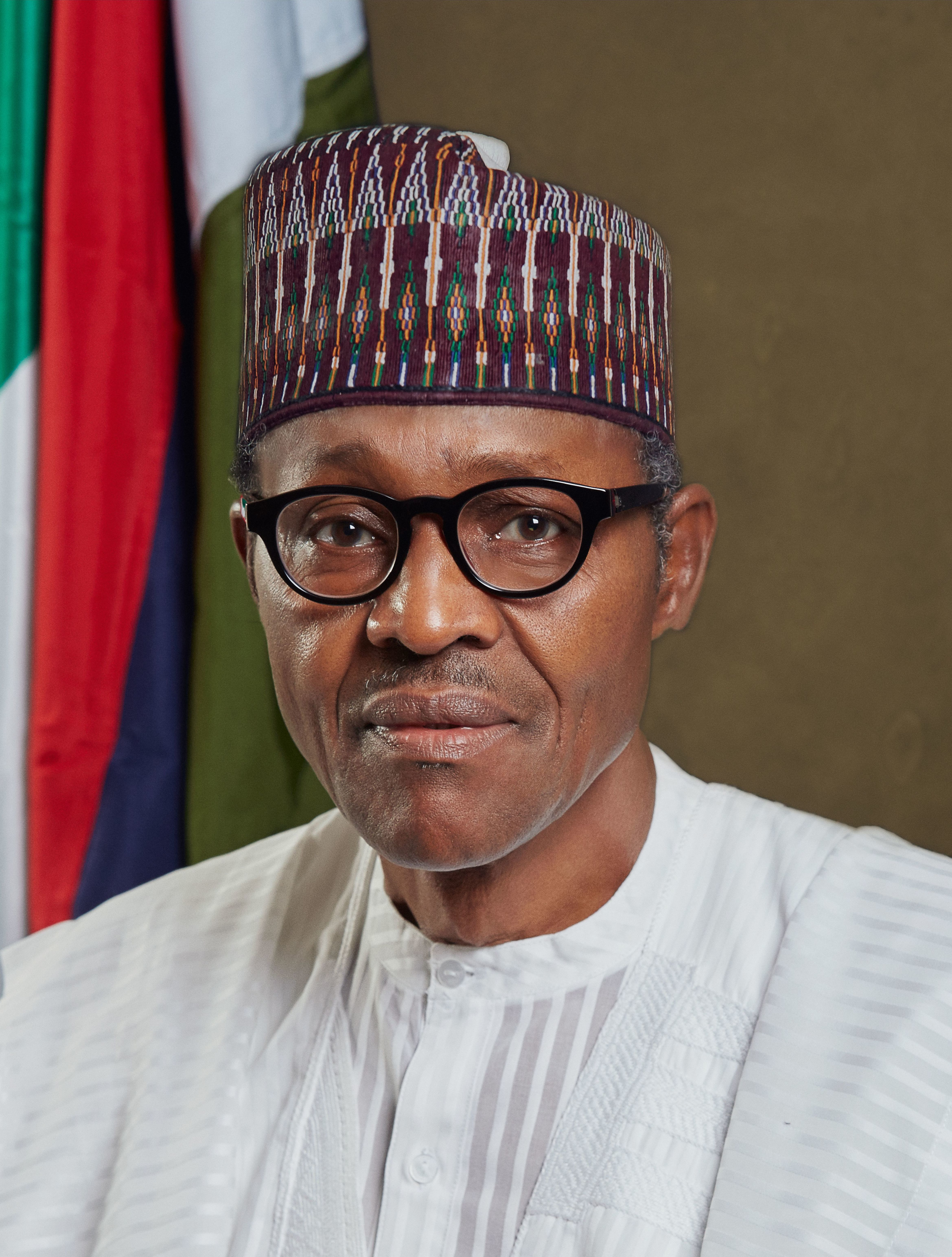
(Nigeria) Nigeria
Muhammadu Buhari,
President

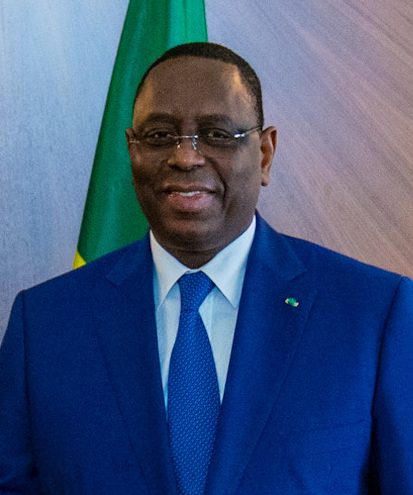
(Senegal) Senegal
Macky Sall,
President

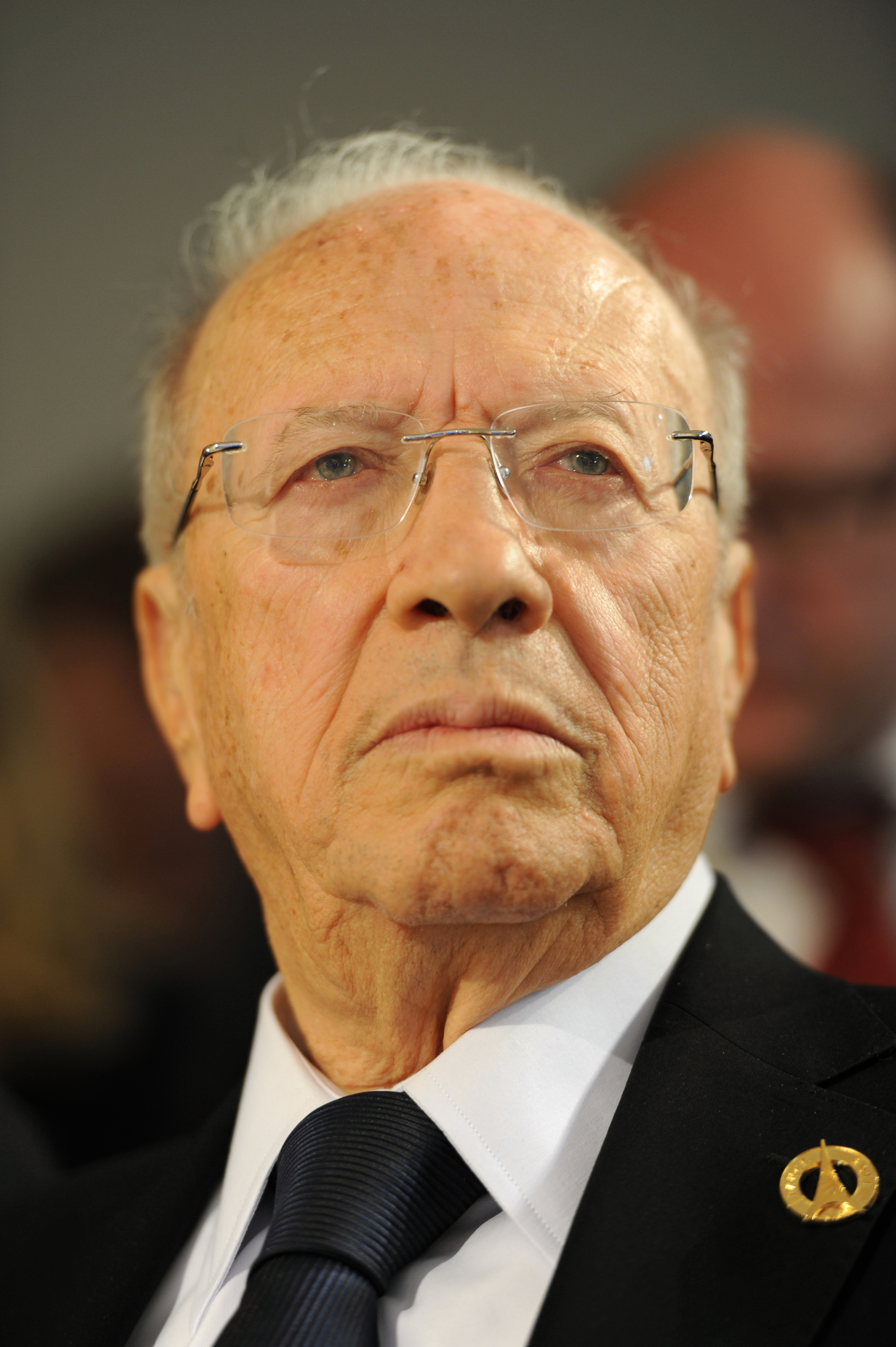
(Tunisia) Tunisia
Beji Caid Essebsi,
President

=== Guest invitees (organizations) ===
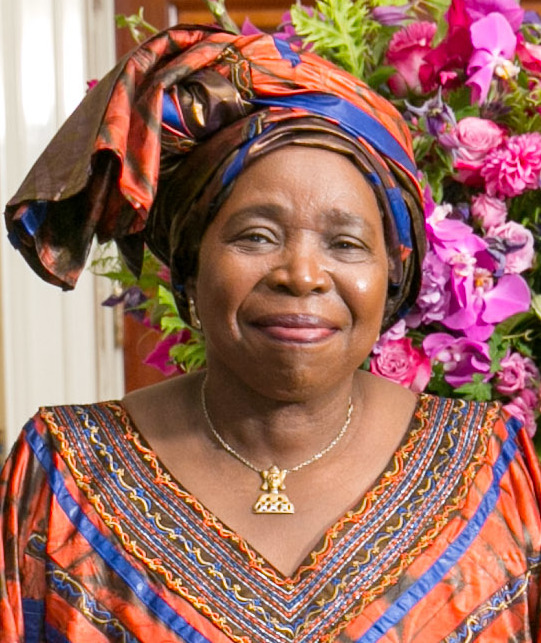
African Union
Nkosazana Dlamini-Zuma,
Chairperson

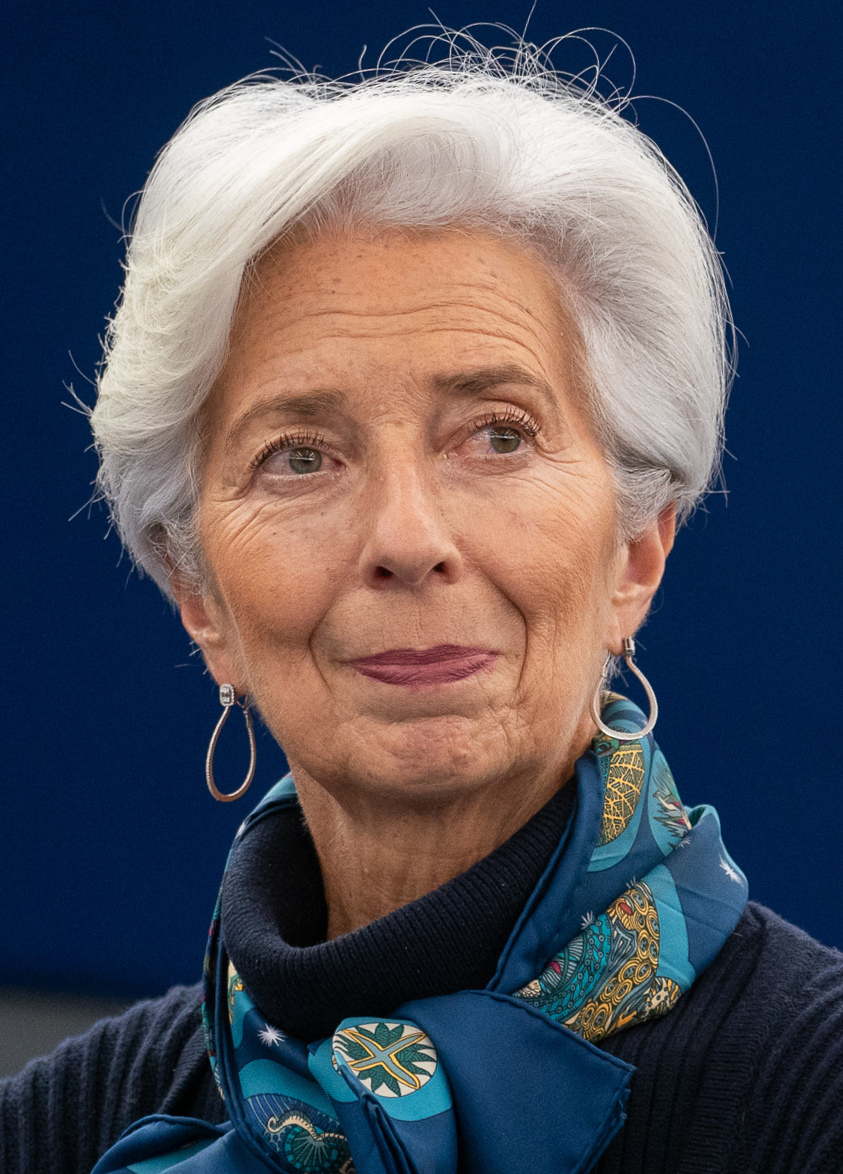
IMF
Christine Lagarde,
managing director

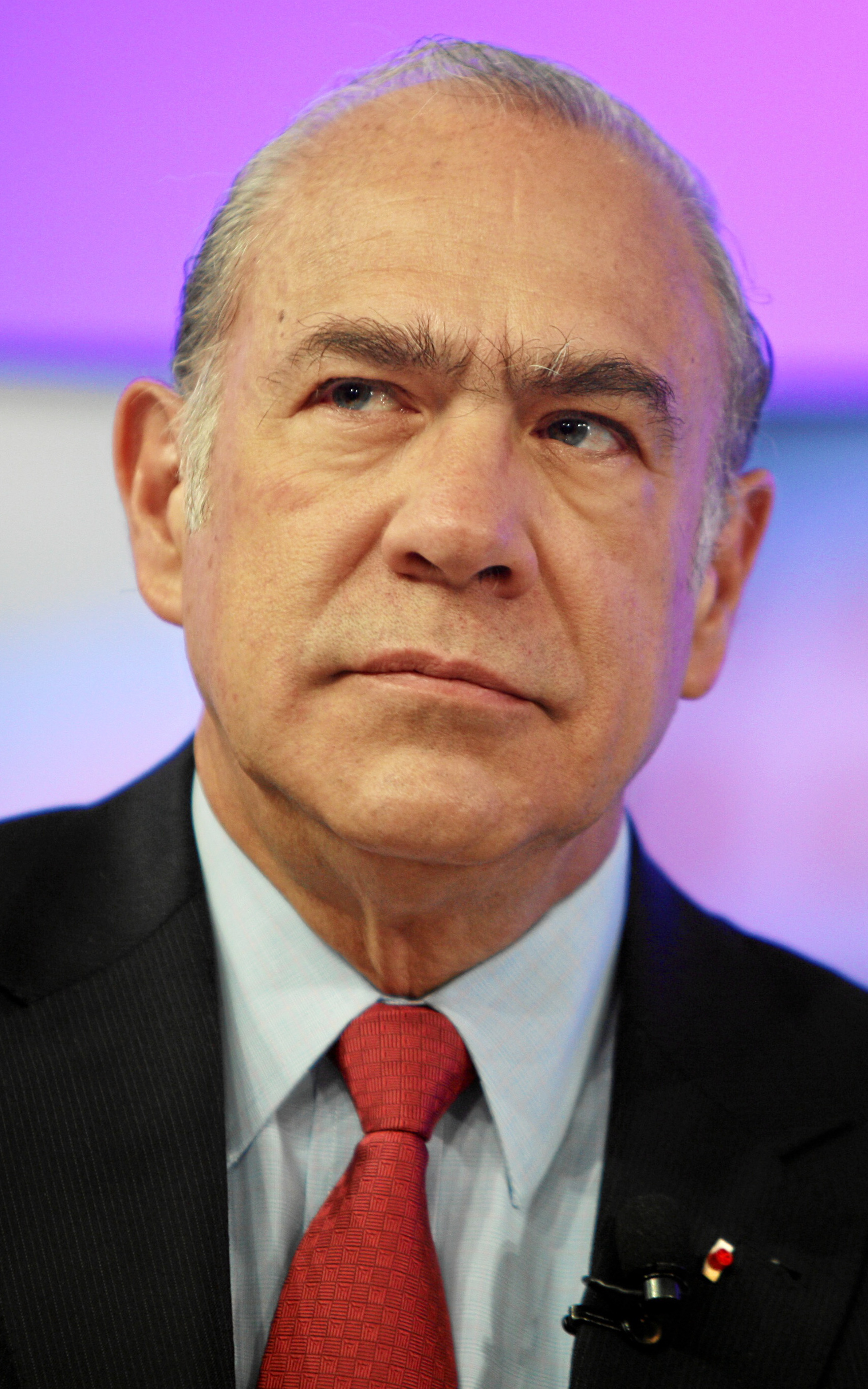
OECD
José Ángel Gurría,
Secretary-General

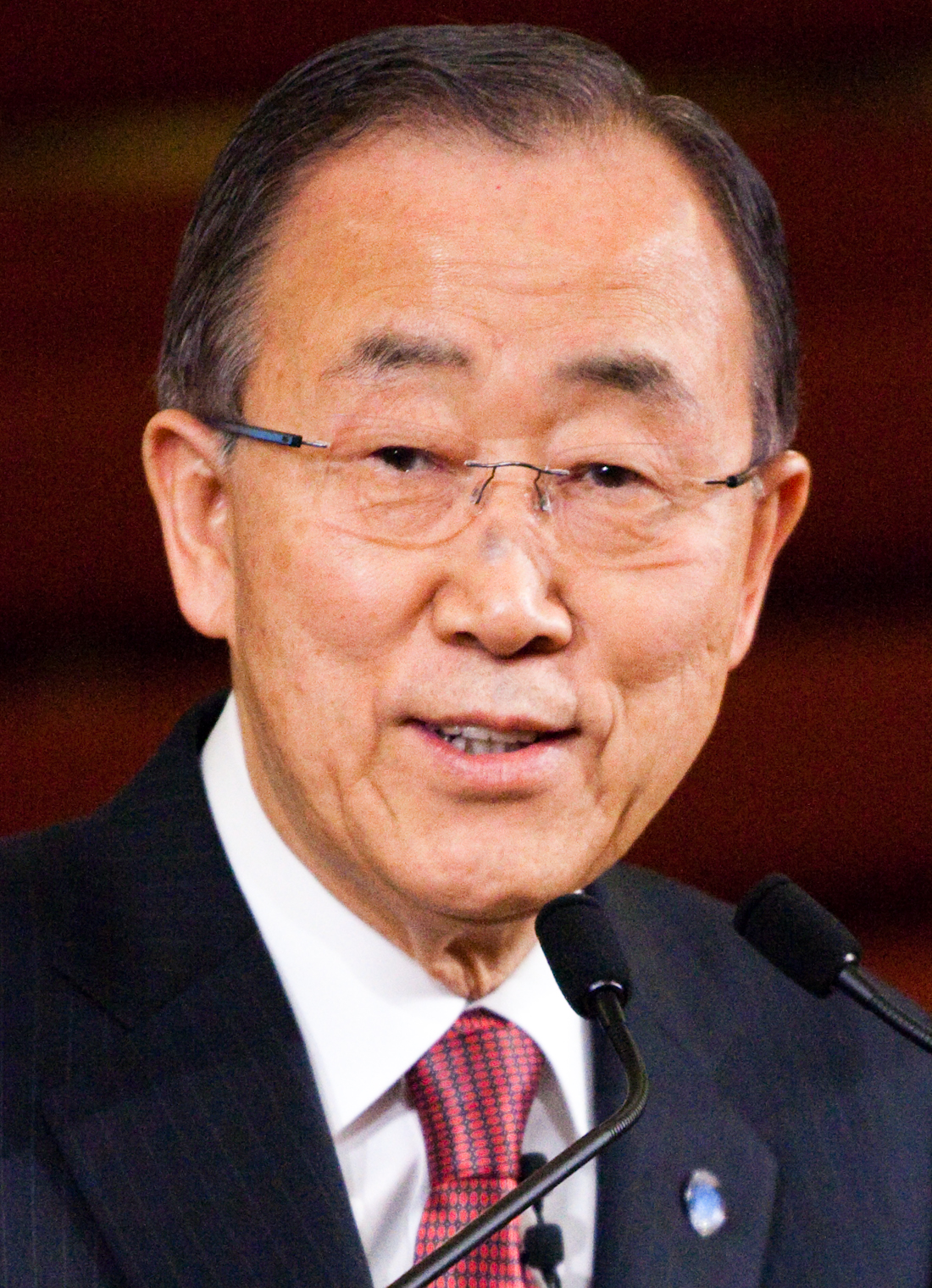
(United Nations) United Nations
Ban Ki-moon,
Secretary-General

== See also ==
- Group of Seven (G7)
- List of G20 summits
