= Barmsee =

Lake in Bavaria, Germany

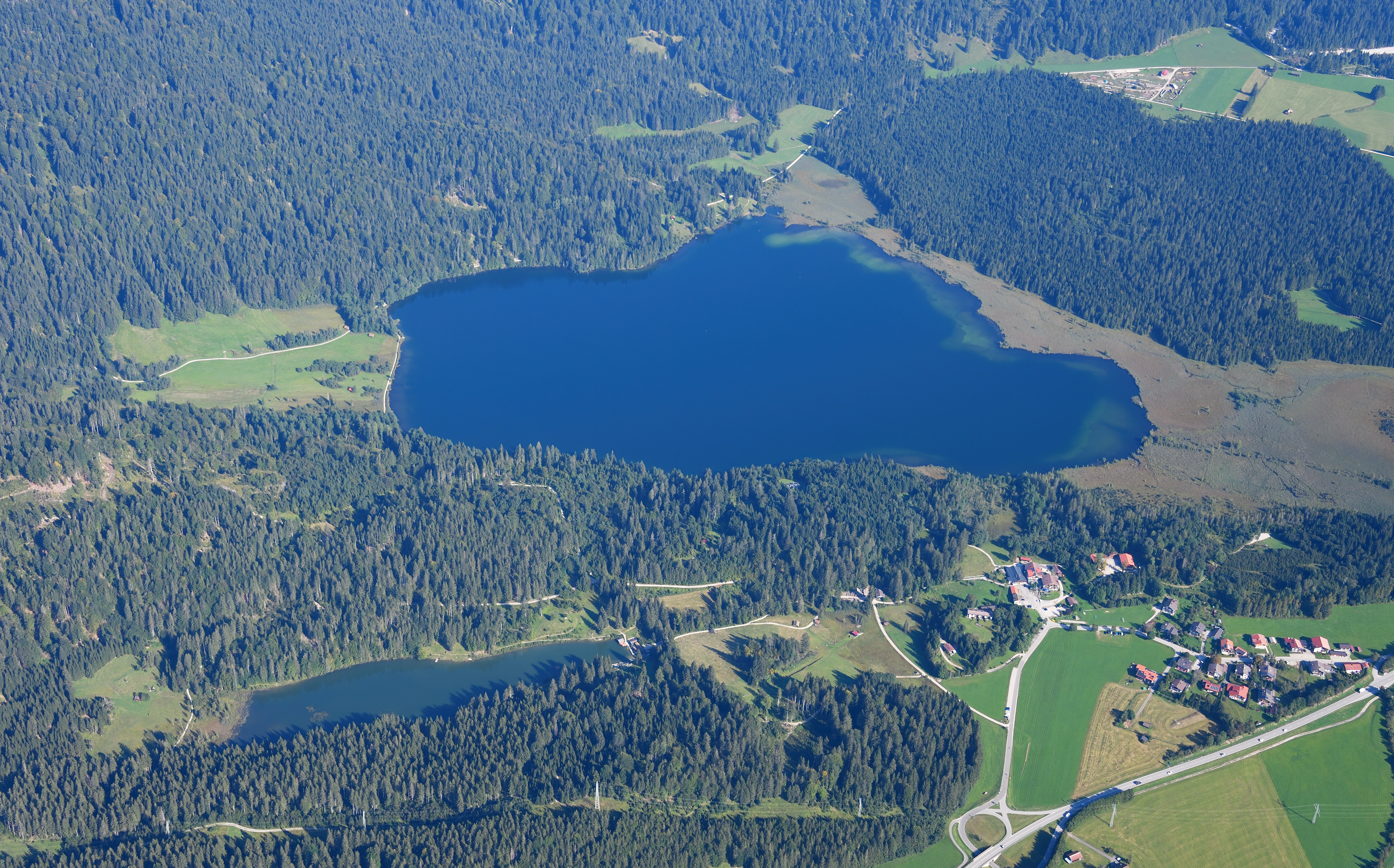

- Location within Bavaria
- Location: Oberbayern, Bavaria
- Coordinates: 47°30′0″N 11°14′50″E
- Lake type: Meromictic
- Primary inflows: Gruberseebach, Seebach
- Primary outflows: Barmseebach
- Catchment area: 3.0 km^{2} (1.2 sq mi)
- Basin countries: Germany
- Max. length: 0.49 km (0.30 mi)
- Max. width: 1.12 km (0.70 mi)
- Surface area: 0.55 km^{2} (0.21 sq mi)
- Average depth: 16.49 m (54.1 ft)
- Max. depth: 30.6 m (100 ft)
- Water volume: 9,070,000 km^{3} (2,180,000 cu mi)
- Residence time: unknown
- Shore length^{1}: 3.3 km (2.1 mi)
- Surface elevation: 885.03 m (2,903.6 ft)
- Islands: none
- Settlements: Wallgau, Klais
- References: https://web.archive.org/web/20110718202013/http://www.wwa-wm.bayern.de/service/infomaterial/doc/barmsee.pdf
- ^{1} Shore length is not a well-defined measure.

Barmsee is a lake in Oberbayern, Bavaria, Germany. At an elevation of 885.03 m, its surface area is 55 hectares.
