= List of lakes of Bavaria =

The list of lakes in Bavaria shows notable lakes in Bavaria, Germany, listed by their German name. In total 109 lakes.

== A ==
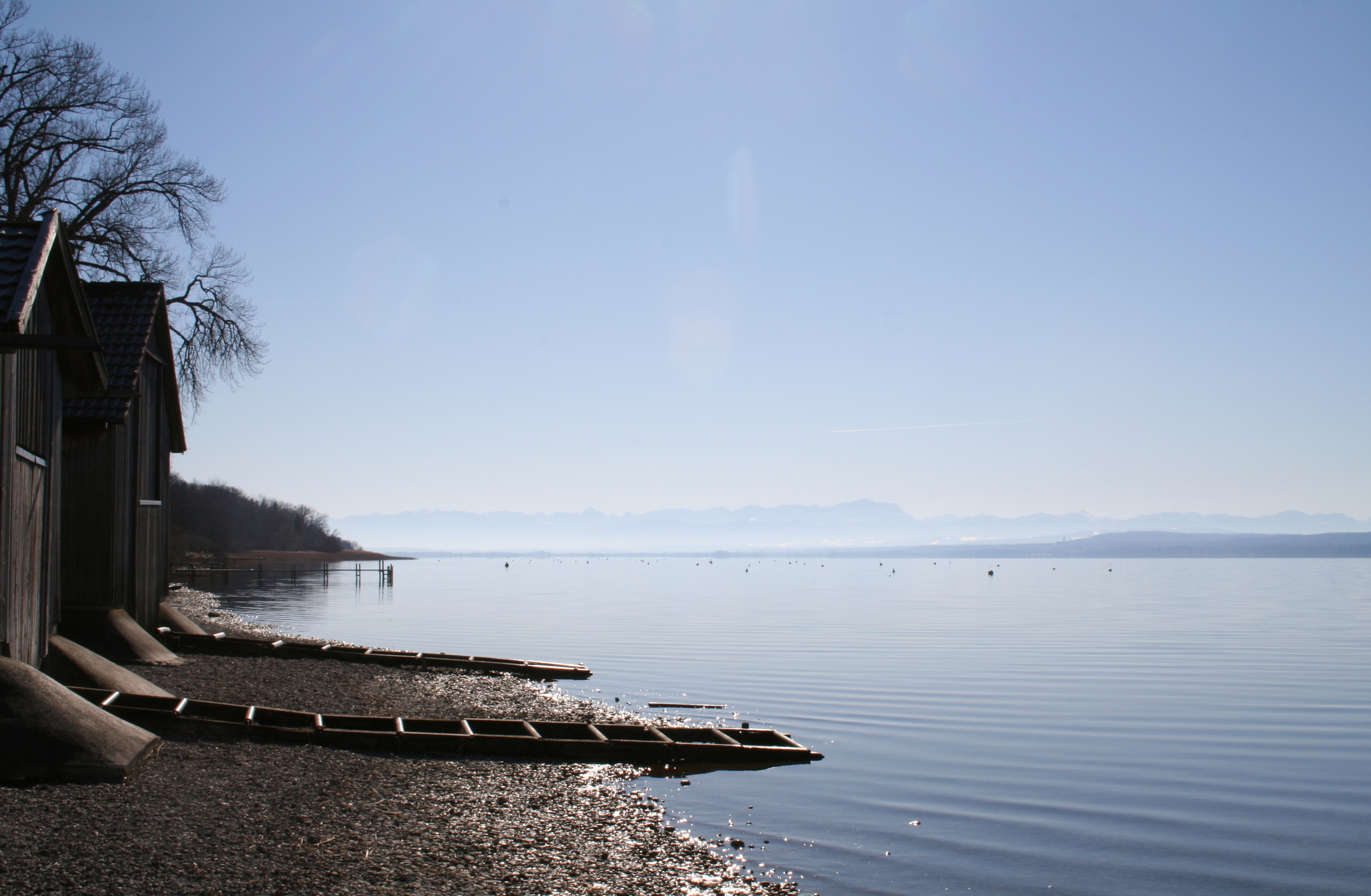
Ammersee

- Abtsdorfer See
- Aindlinger Baggersee
- Alatsee
- Alpsee
- Altmühlsee
- Ammersee
- Auensee
- Großer Arbersee
- Kleiner Arbersee
- Autobahnsee Augsburg

== B ==
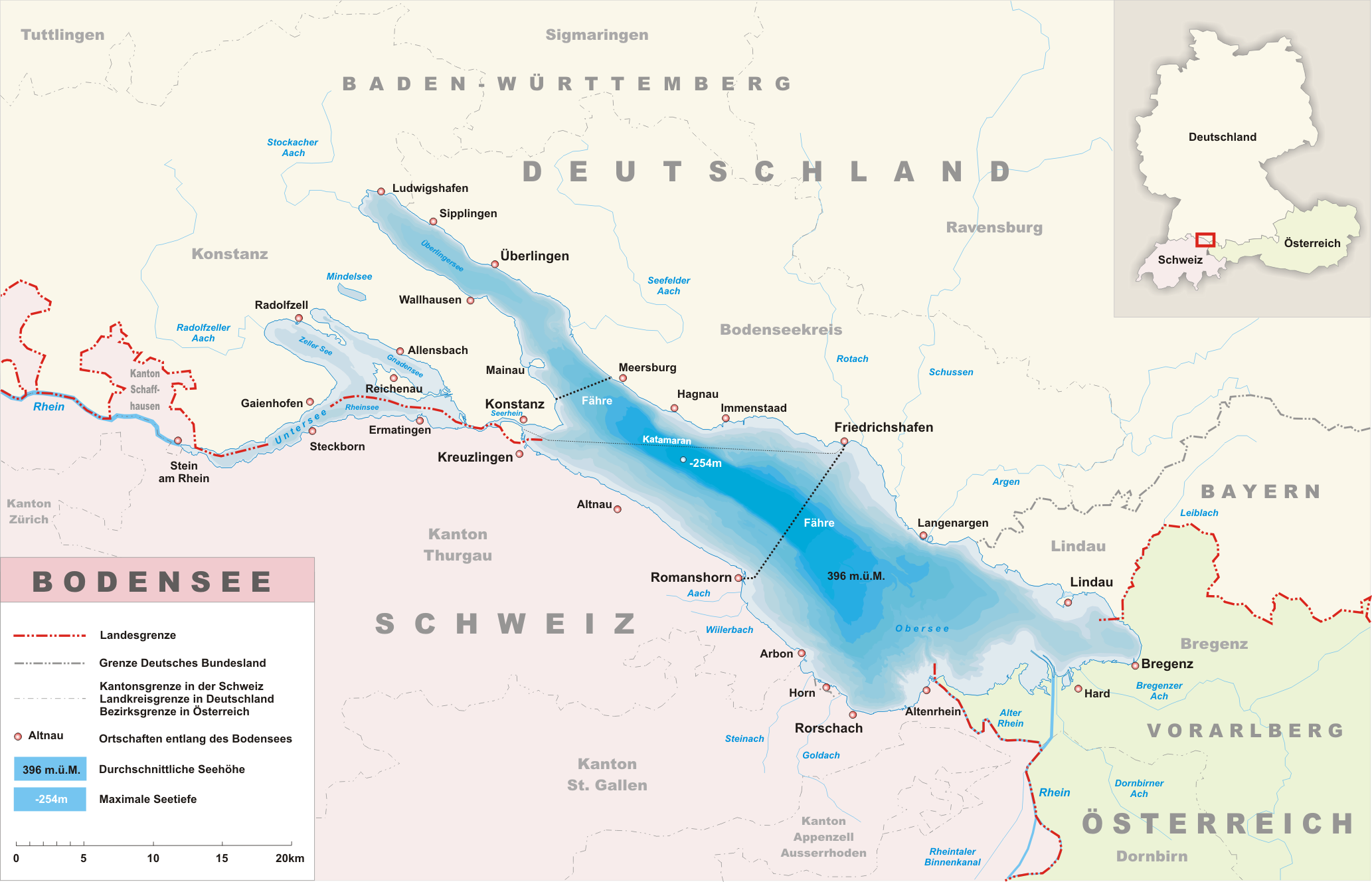
Lake Constance

- Bannwaldsee
- Barmsee
- Bergfeldsee
- Biber
- Birkensee
- Blaue Lache
- Lake Constance (Bodensee, international)
- Großer Brombachsee
- Kleiner Brombachsee

== C ==
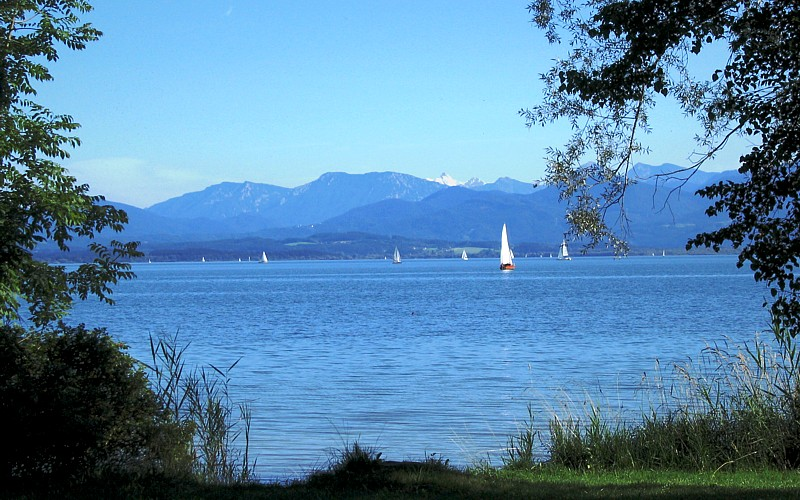
Chiemsee

- Chiemsee

== D ==
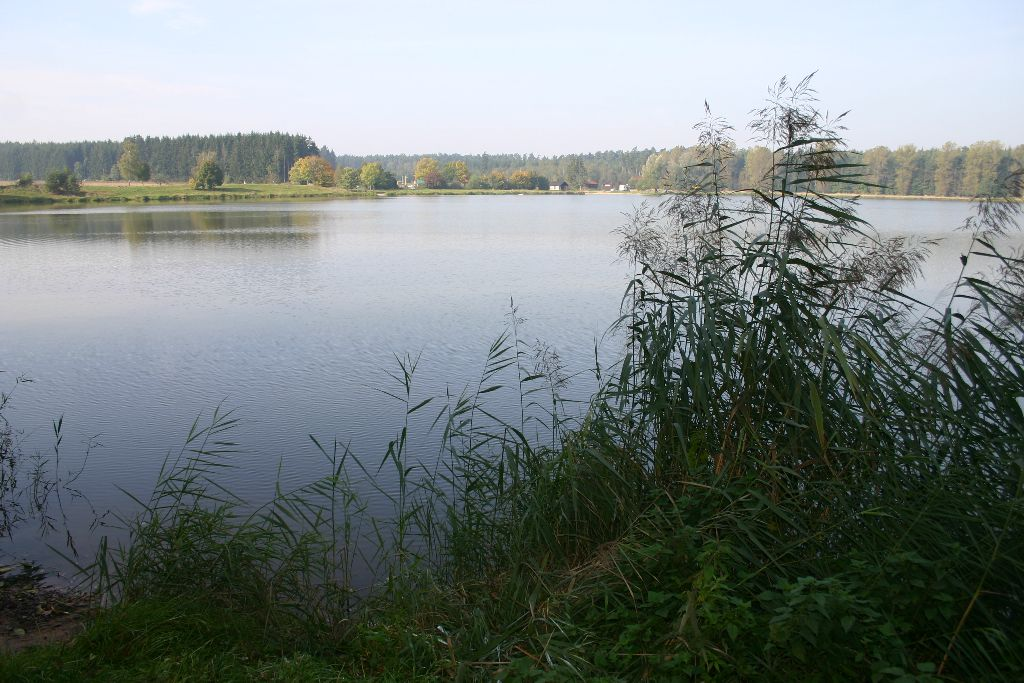
Dennenloher See

- Dennenloher See
- Derchinger Baggersee
- Dornautalsperre
- Dreiburgensee
- Dutzendteich

== E ==
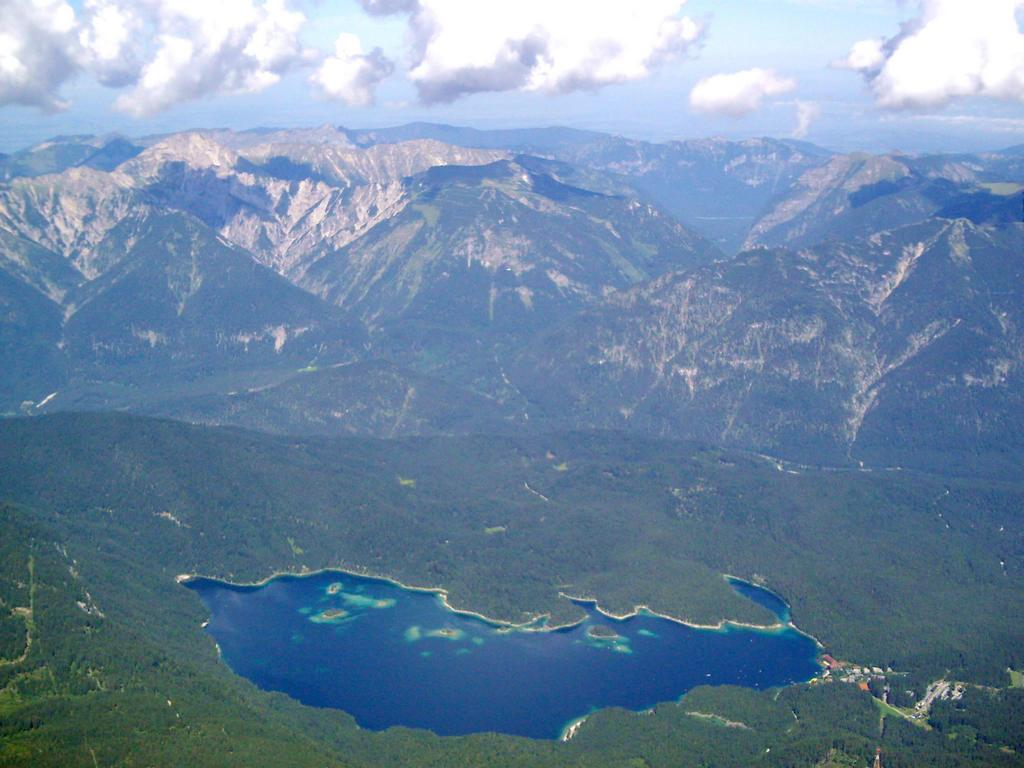
Eibsee

- Eggstätter Seen
- Eibsee
- Ellertshäuser See
- Eschacher Weiher

== F ==
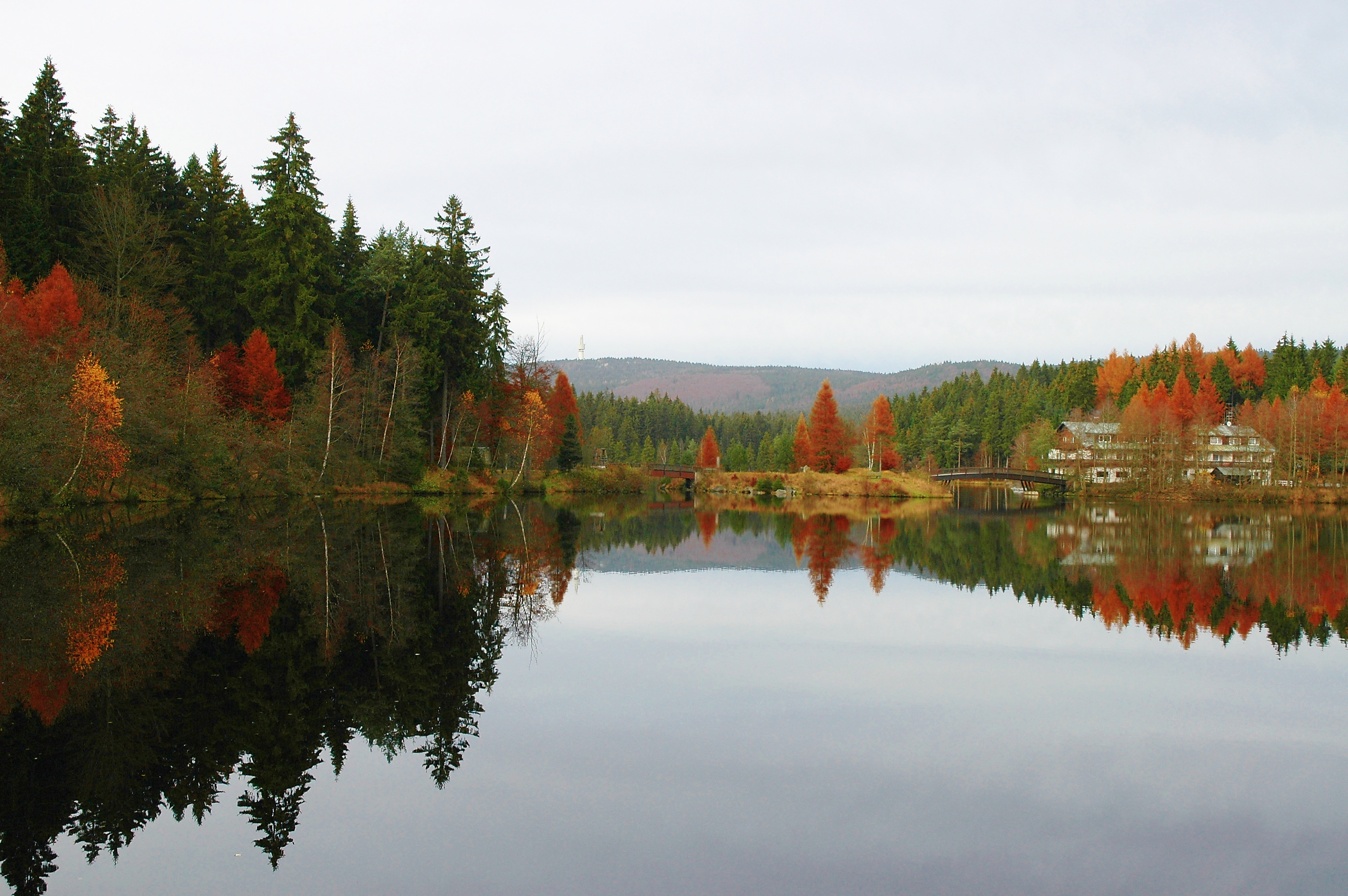
Fichtelsee

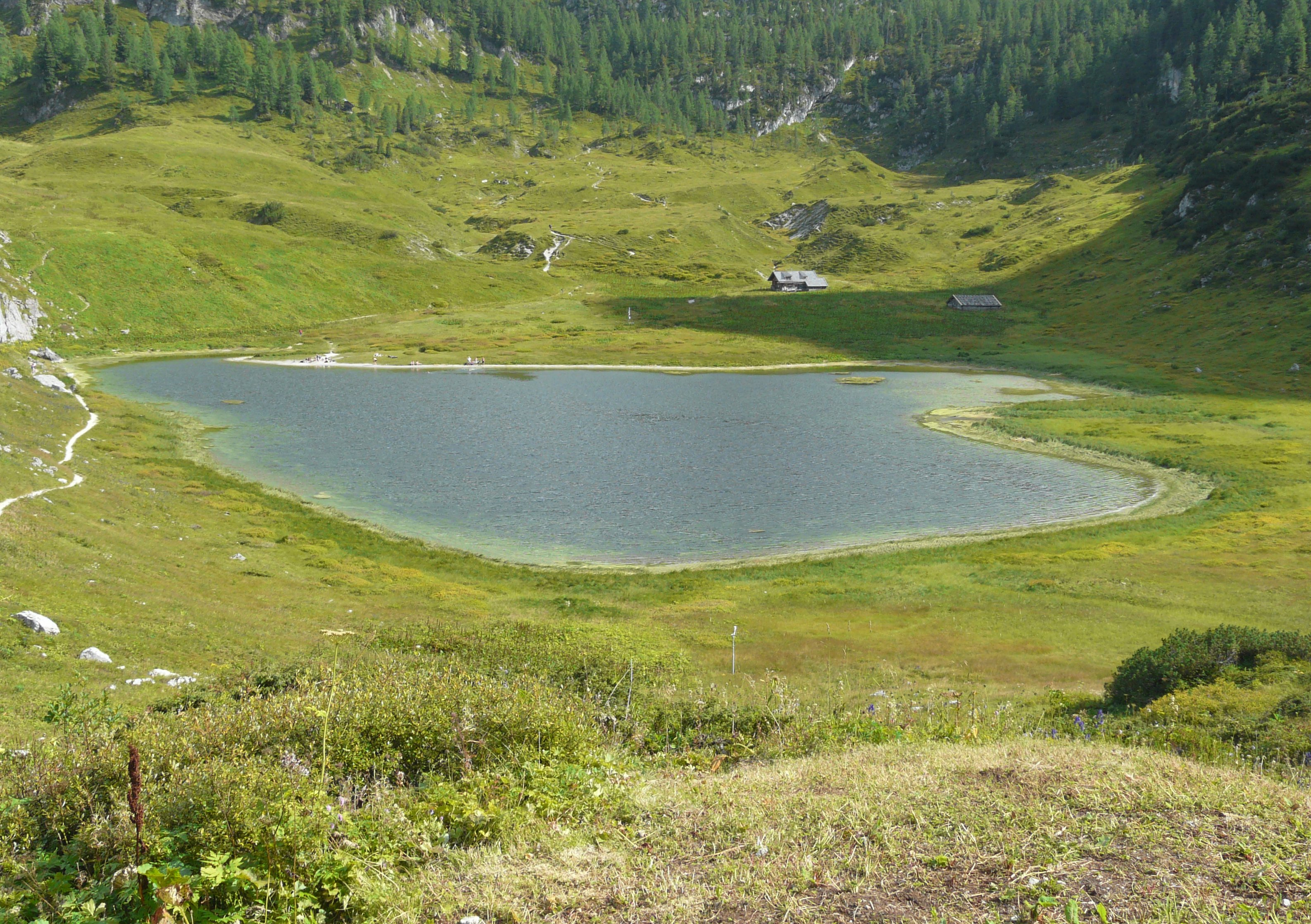
Funtensee

- Fasaneriesee
- Feisnitz Reservoir
- Feldmochinger See
- Ferchensee
- Feringasee
- Fichtsee
- Fichtelsee
- Forggensee
- Franconian Lake District
- Frauenau Reservoir
- Freibergsee
- Frickenhäuser See
- Fridolfinger See
- Friedberger Baggersee
- Froschgrundsee
- Funtensee

== G ==
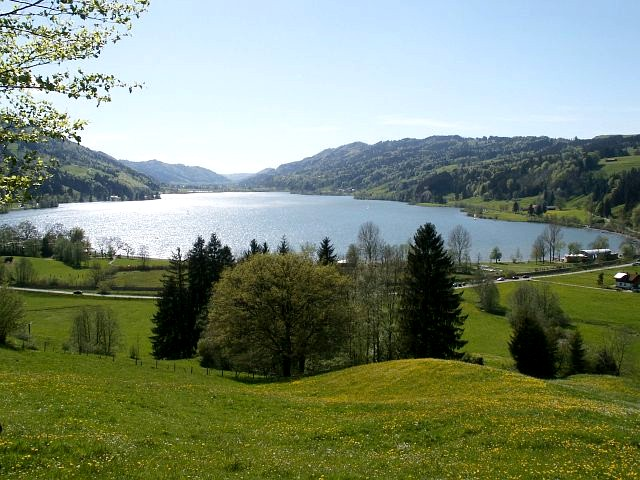
Großer Alpsee

- Großer Alpsee
- Großer Arbersee
- Grünsee
- Guggersee

== H ==
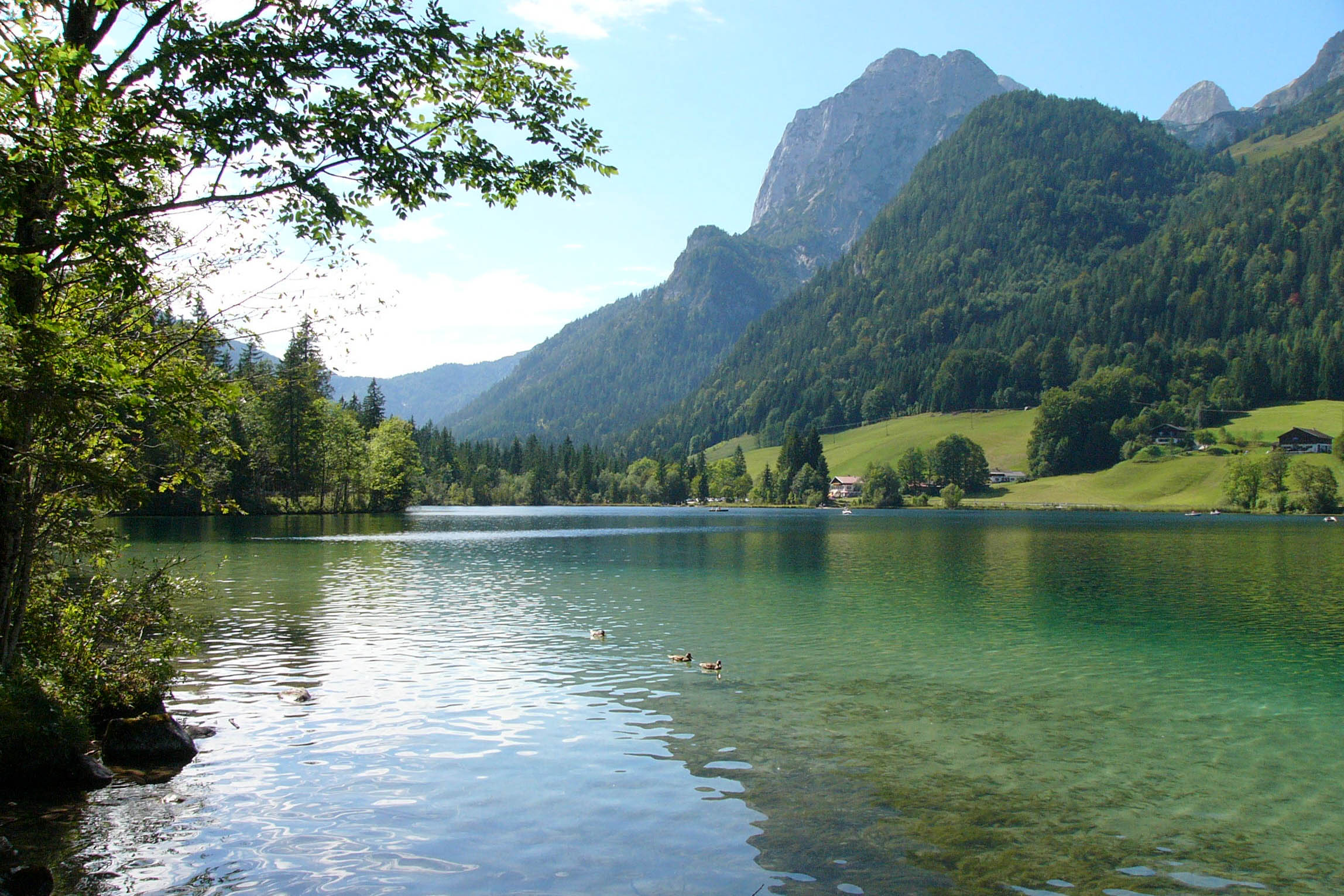
Hintersee

- Hahnenkammsee
- Heimstettener See
- Hintersee
- Höglwörther See
- Höllensteinsee
- Hopfensee

== I ==
- Ilsesee

== K ==
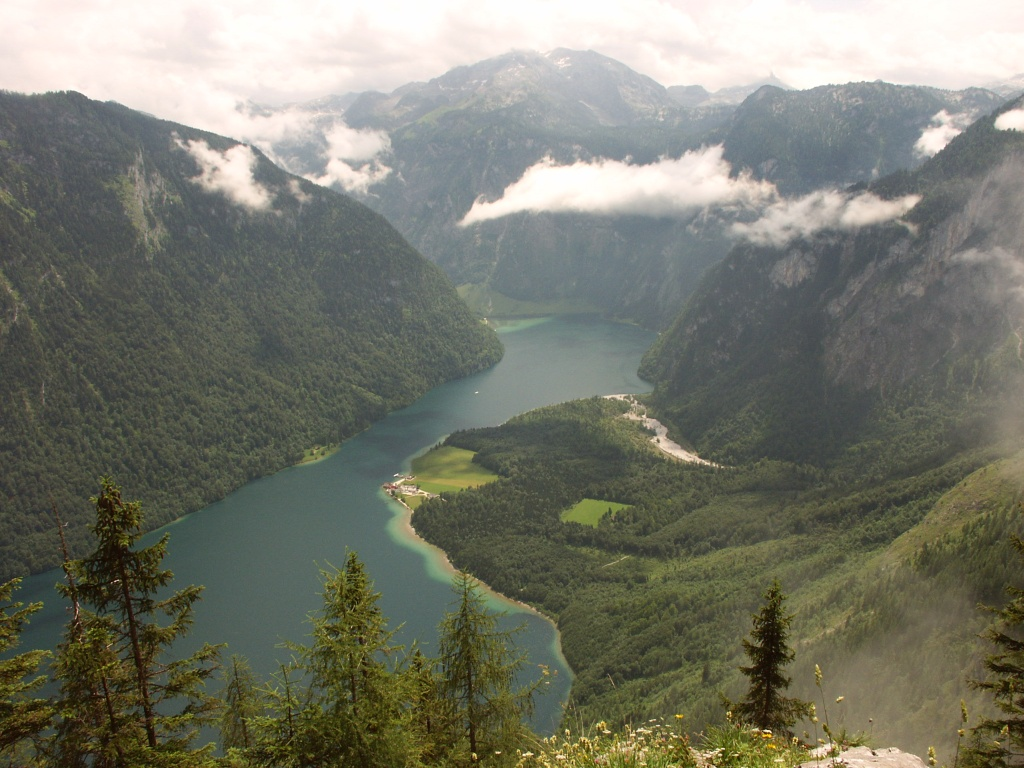
Königssee

- Kaisersee
- Kirchsee
- Kleiner Arbersee
- Kleinhesseloher See
- Kochelsee
- Königssee
- Kuhsee

== L ==
- Langenprozelten Pumped Storage Station
- Langwieder See
- Latschensee
- Lautersee
- Lerchenauer See
- Luttensee
- Lödensee
- Lußsee

== M ==
- Mittersee
- Murner See

== N ==
- Nadisee
- Niedersonthofener See

== O ==
- Oberrieder Weiher
- Obersee
- Osterseen

== P ==
- Pilsensee

== R ==
- Rachelsee
- Radersdorfer Baggersee
- Rannasee
- Rappensee
- Riemer See
- Riessersee

== S ==
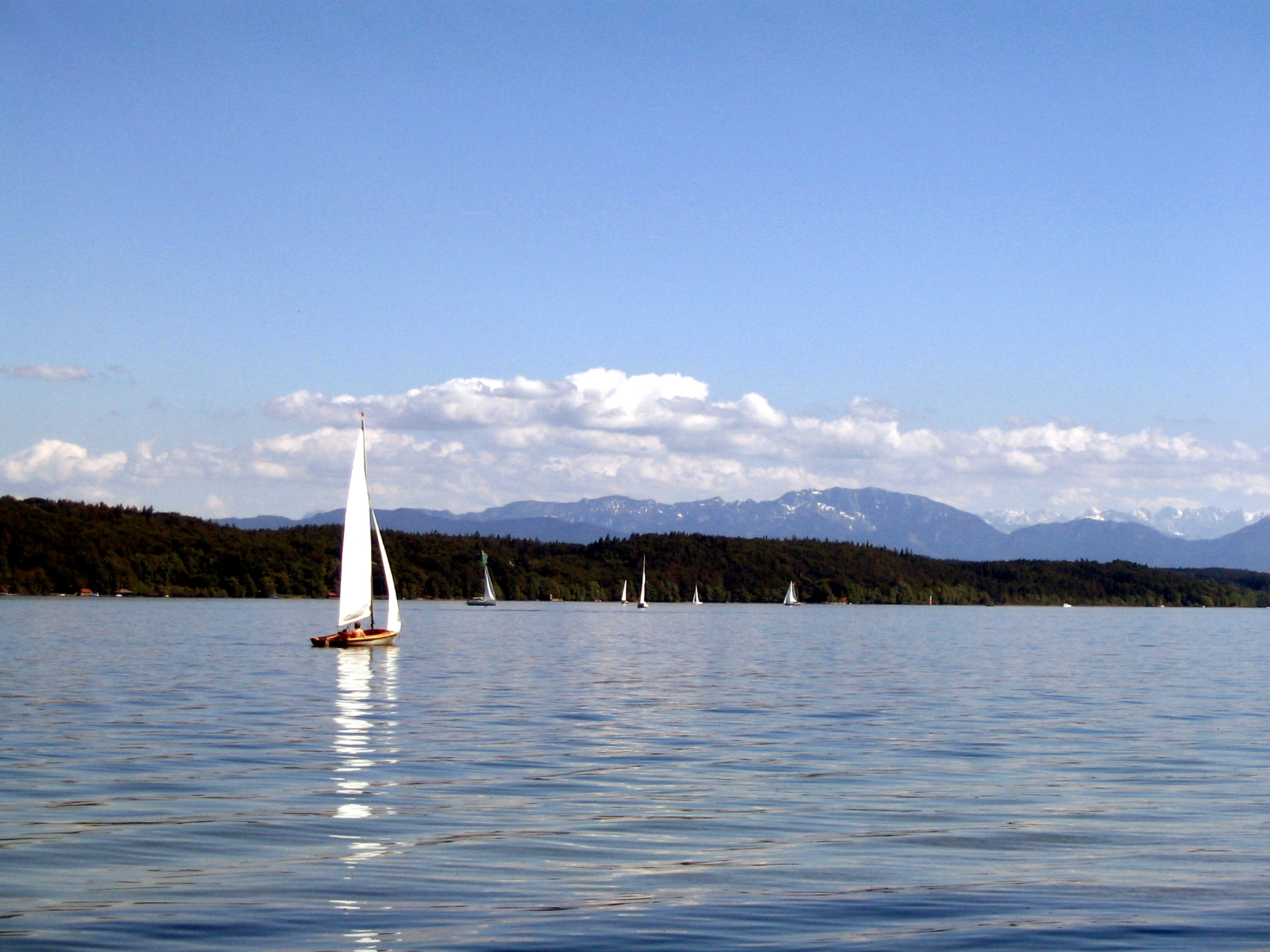
Lake Starnberg

- Sarchinger Weiher
- Schliersee
- Schwaltenweiher
- Schwansee
- Seehamer See
- Seeon Lakes (Seeoner Seen)
- Simssee
- Soiernseen
- Soinsee
- Spitzingsee
- Staffelsee
- Lake Starnberg (Starnberger See)
- Steinberger See
- Steinsee
- Stempflesee
- Sylvensteinspeicher

== T ==
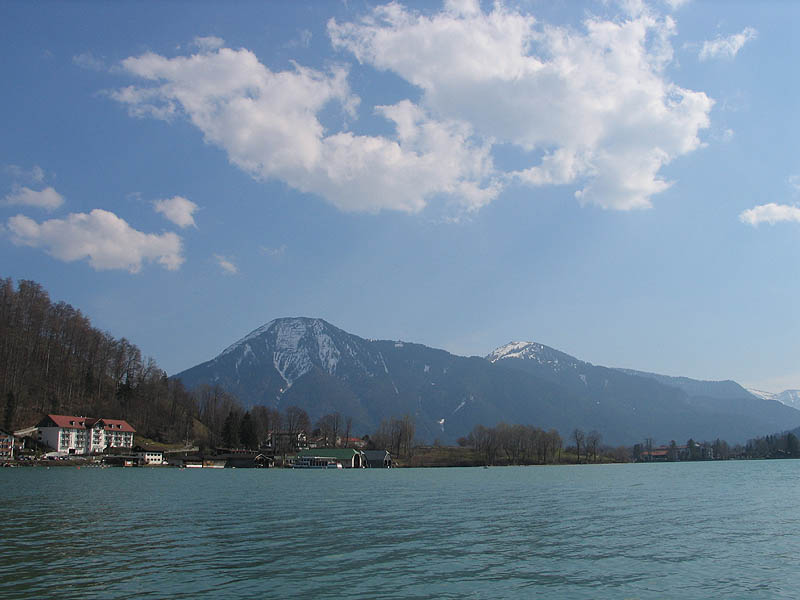
Tegernsee

- Tegernsee
- Tüttensee

== W ==
- Waginger See
- Walchensee
- Weißensee
- Weitmannsee
- Weitsee
- Weßlinger See
- Wiesbüttsee
- Wöhrder See
- Wörthsee
