= Memhölz =

Village in Bavaria, Germany

Coordinates: 47°38′52″N 10°16′27″E

- Village
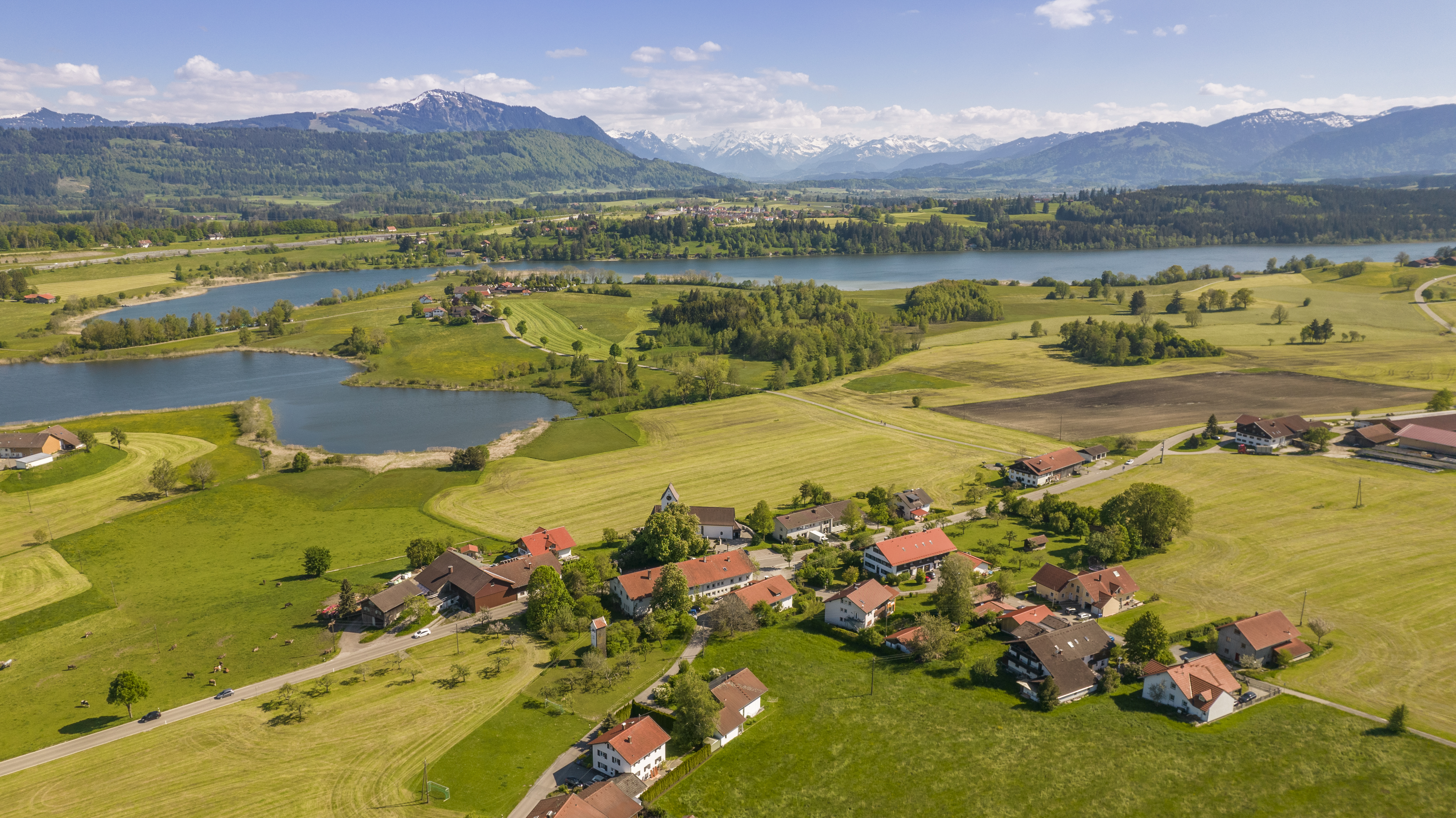
- Memhölz

- Location in Bavaria Location in Germany
- Country: Germany
- State: Bavaria
- Administrative region: Swabia
- District: Oberallgäu
- Municipality: Waltenhofen

Memhölz is a village in the municipality of Waltenhofen, in the district of Oberallgäu, Swabia, Bavaria, Germany. In the Bavarian historical place-name database, Memhölz is classified as a Pfarrdorf ("parish village").

The municipality of Waltenhofen counts Memhölz among its official localities, and BayernPortal lists it as one of the municipality's Ortsteile. Together with Martinszell and Niedersonthofen, Memhölz forms part of the recreational area around the Niedersonthofener See.

== Name ==
Historical forms of the name recorded in the Bavarian place-name database include Memehiltz (1274/1275), Memhildes (1325), Memhiltz (1353), Memmhilcz (1391), and Mainhiltz (1502). The database interprets the name as meaning "settlement of Mimehilt".

== Landmarks ==
The Catholic parish church of St. Andrew (German: St. Andreas) in Memhölz was first mentioned in 1275. According to the municipality, it contains a late-Gothic baptismal font dated 1475, bearing the coat of arms of the Reichen-Ritzner patronal family. The church is listed by the Roman Catholic Diocese of Augsburg as the parish church of St. Andreas in Memhölz.

Memhölz is also home to Schönstatt auf'm Berg, a Schönstatt centre described by its operators as a house for holidays, retreats and conferences, with a pilgrimage chapel above the Niedersonthofen lakes.
