= Steinberg am See =

Steinberg
- Municipality
- Coat of arms

- Location of Steinberg within Schwandorf district
- Interactive map of Steinberg
- Location within Germany Location within Bavaria
- Coordinates: 49°16′33″N 12°10′52″E
- Country: Germany
- State: Bavaria
- Admin. region: Oberpfalz
- District: Schwandorf
- Municipal assoc.: Wackersdorf

Government
  - Mayor (2020–26): Harald Bemmerl (SPD)

Area
  - Total: 20.21 km^{2} (7.80 sq mi)
- Elevation: 372 m (1,220 ft)

Population (2025-12-31)
  - Total: 1,927
  - Density: 95.35/km^{2} (247.0/sq mi)
- Time zone: UTC+01:00 (CET)
  - Summer (DST): UTC+02:00 (CEST)
- Postal codes: 92449
- Dialling codes: 0 94 31
- Vehicle registration: SAD
- Website: www.gemeinde-steinberg.com

Steinberg am See (German pronunciation: [ˈʃtaɪnbɛʁk ʔam ˈzeː], lit. 'Steinberg on Lake'; Northern Bavarian: Stoaberg) is a municipality in the district of Schwandorf in Bavaria, Germany.

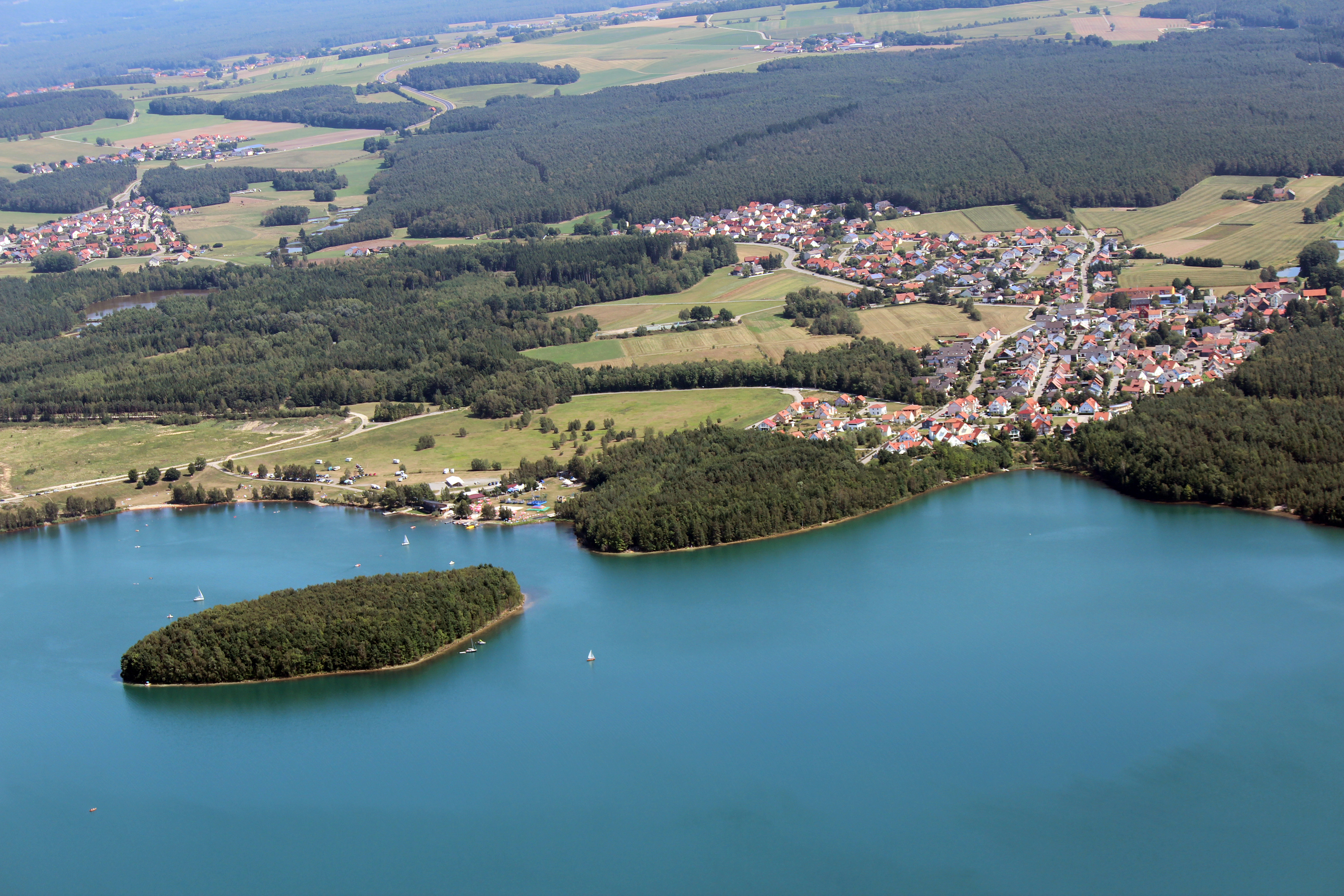
Steinberger See (Steinberg lake) with Steinberg
