= Autobahnsee Augsburg =

Lake in Bavaria, Germany

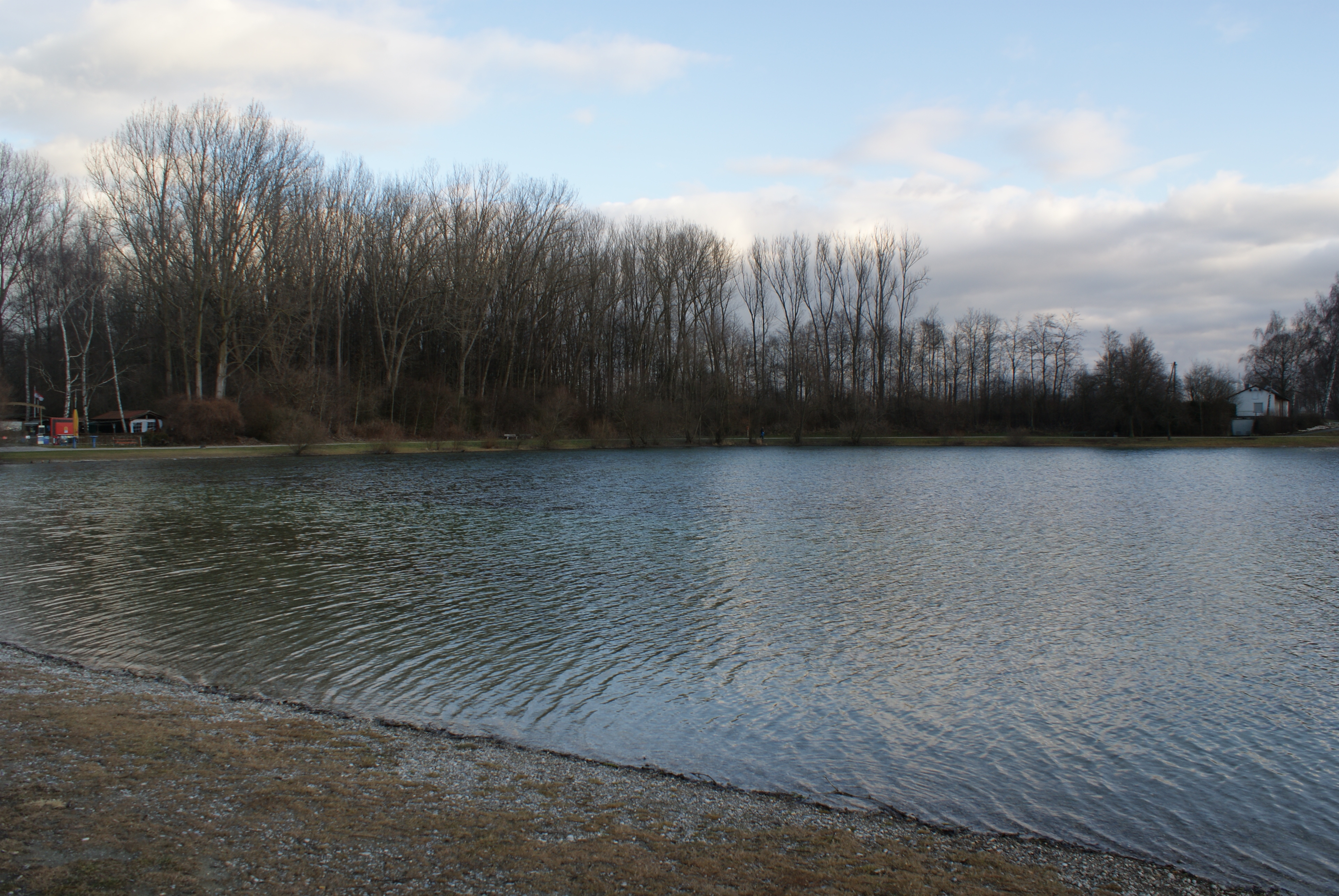

- Location within Bavaria
- Location: Augsburg, Schwaben, Bavaria
- Coordinates: 48°24′36.37″N 10°55′40.36″E
- Primary inflows: groundwater, precipitation
- Primary outflows: groundwater
- Basin countries: Germany
- Max. length: ca. 650 m (2,130 ft)
- Max. width: 300 m (980 ft)
- Surface area: 17 ha (42 acres)
- Max. depth: ca. 4 m (13 ft)
- Settlements: Augsburg / Gersthofen

Autobahnsee Augsburg is a lake in Augsburg, Swabia, Bavaria, Germany. It is located along the Bundesautobahn 8, south of Augsburg Airport. At an elevation of 50m, its surface area is 17 ha. The lake is mainly used as a bathing lake, but portions are used for fish farming. The local Health Office is responsible for monitoring water quality.

== History ==
The Autobahnsee is an artificial lake that was excavated between 1936 and 1937 to obtain gravel for motorway construction. The area subsequently served as a training area for the Sturmabteilung. There were plans to build a hotel and a lido, a type of public swimming area, on the land, but they were ruined by the outbreak of the Second World War.

== Description ==
The Autobahnsee is located just north of the Bundesautobahn 8 motorway and is bordered to the east by the village of Dickelsmoor. There are three parking places for those seeking recreation as well as lawns, barbecue facilities, children's games and toilets. Access is via a path that runs around the lake. For the safety of visitors, a waterfront station is located directly on the shore. The lake has a small pier specially designed for model boats.

The Kaisersee lake and the Derchinger Baggersee are located nearby.

== Fishing and aquaculture ==
It is possible to fish in the lake according to local regulations. Commonly available species include rainbow trout, char and brook trout. Pike are also common in the lake, but they will rarely be larger than about 45 centimetres (18 in).

=== Aquaculture ===
Portions of the Autobahnsee are used for fish farming, primarily carp, eel, tench and rainbow trout.
