= Luttensee =

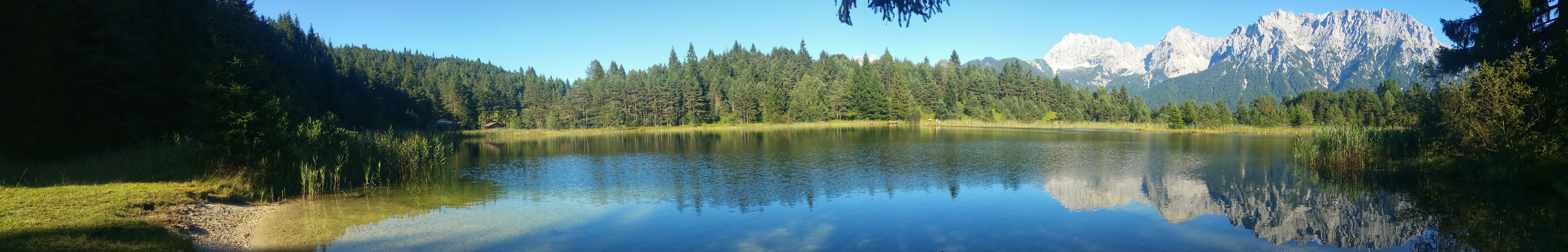
- Luttensee

- Location within Bavaria
- Location: Gemeinde Mittenwald, Bavaria
- Coordinates: 47°27′30″N 11°15′00″E
- Type: natural lake
- Basin countries: Germany
- Surface elevation: 1,021 m (3,350 ft)
- Settlements: Mittenwald

Luttensee is a small natural lake in the municipality of Mittenwald, Landkreis Garmisch-Partenkirchen, Upper Bavaria, Germany.

== Location ==
The lake is located c. 4 Kilometres northwest of the village of Mittenwald within a mountain area called Wettersteingebiet. A ski resort is located on the adjoining Mt. Hoher Kranzberg and other areas in the vicinity during the winter.

The elevation is 1021 Metres above sea level. The maximum length is 180 Metres, the maximum width is 140 Metres, the maximum depth is 4 Metres.

== See also ==
- List of lakes in Bavaria
