= Riemer See =

Lake in Munich, Bavaria, Germany

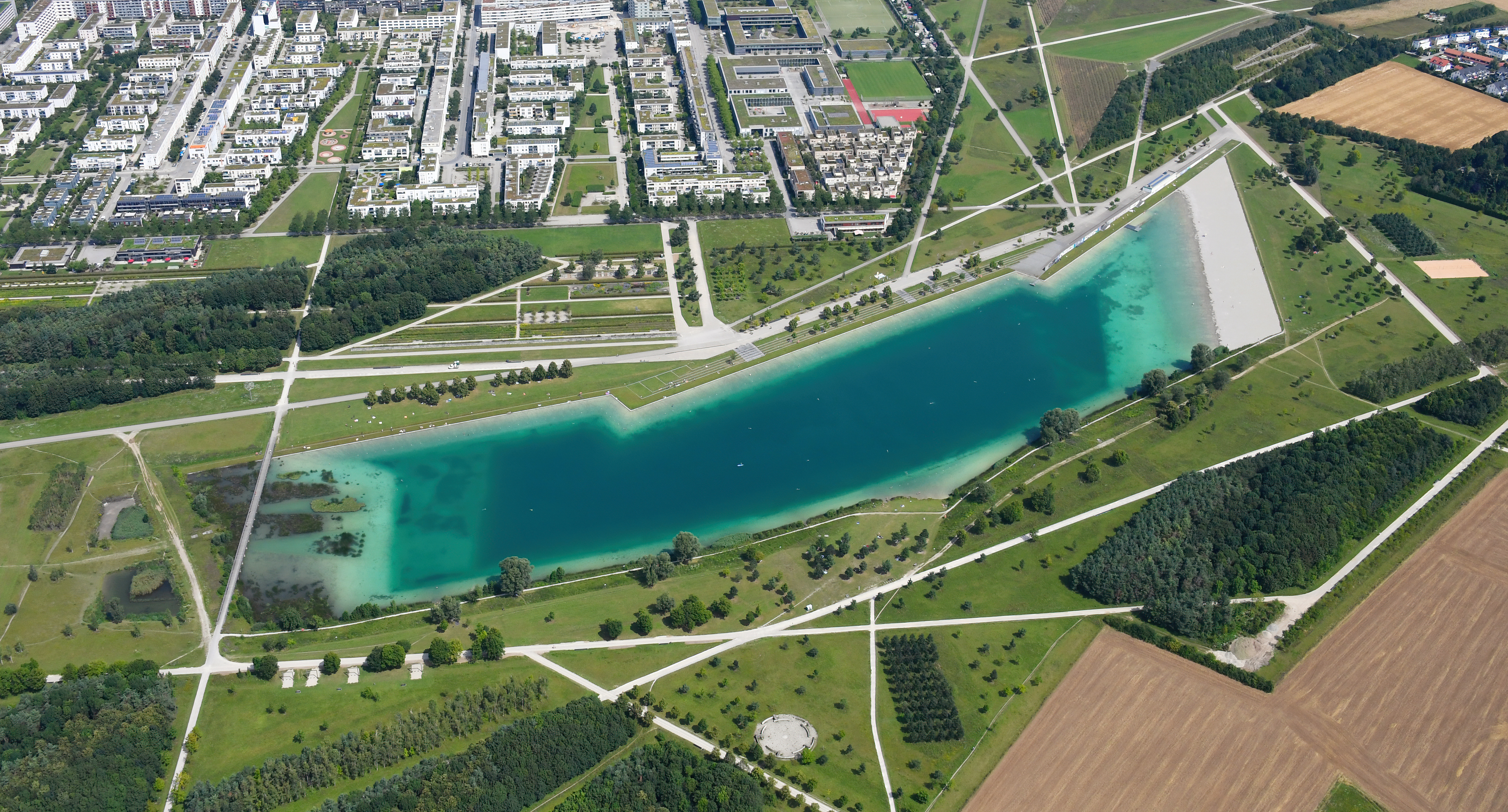

- Location within Bavaria
- Location: Messestadt Riem, Munich, Bavaria
- Coordinates: 48°7′24″N 11°42′20″E
- Basin countries: Germany
- Max. length: 700 m (2,300 ft)
- Max. width: 150 m (490 ft)
- Surface area: 7.7 ha (19 acres)
- Average depth: 14 m (46 ft)
- Max. depth: 18 m (59 ft)
- Surface elevation: 530.0 m (1,738.8 ft)

The Riemer See lake in Riemer Park, was a part of the Bundesgartenschau 2005, and is an artificial lake in Munich, Bavaria, Germany.

The Riemer Park which is located in the new Messestadt Riem, was planned by the French landscape architect Gilles Vexlard. The Riemer See is located in the most eastern part of the park. It makes up a fresh water area of approximately 7.7 hectares, and is 14 meters deep, in some areas as deep as 18 meters. The lake is surrounded by the park which includes a north shore, pier and beach area that makes up another 6.1 hectares.

== Planning ==
The north shore connects the lake with the emerging new residential districts and takes on an urban character through its quays and promenades. The remote urban areas transition to the landscapes scenic south shore designed with extensive meadows and planted trees. The narrow shallow water zone on the river bank has been filled with a rich variety of perennials. The natural western shore provides a reed belt in the shallow area which is used for water purification and an overflow area with infiltration basins, a pedestrian bridge spans over the area and provides a connection from north to south and allows visitors to experience nature. The eastern shore is a beach for swimming, with a gently sloped shoreline which allows for a safe swimming area for children, it is surrounded by lawn areas with much room for lounging.

== Technical specifications ==
Due to the very high groundwater fluctuations and despite the lack of space, a sealed ground water lake with a high water table was built. The lakes water-impermeable layers (tertiary) are sealed around and create a dense run off trough. To avoid groundwater damming, three basic water transfers (culverts) were built allow water to transfer from south to north, and in addition to the run off area, the groundwater is pumped out of the ground in the other surrounding areas and flows into the lake. Through an overflow area at the western end of the lake, the access water is purified in the infiltration basin and fed into the ground water. Through the exchange of water, consistent water quality can be ensured.

== Security ==
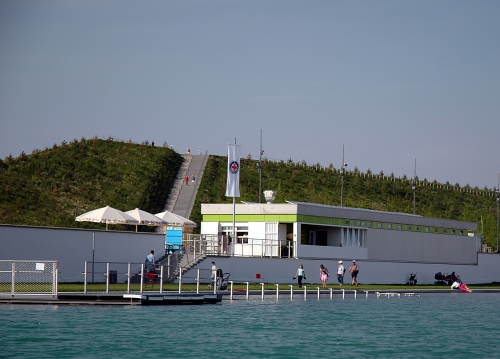
Water Rescue Station of Munich Riem

As part of the landscape design for the Bundesgartenschau 2005, a new water rescue station between the northern and eastern shores of the Riemer lake was created. Since the end of the Bundesgartenschau, the lifeguard duties were taken over by a local Wasserwacht group made up of 20 members.

== See also ==
- List of lakes in Bavaria
