= Osterseen =

Lakes in Germany

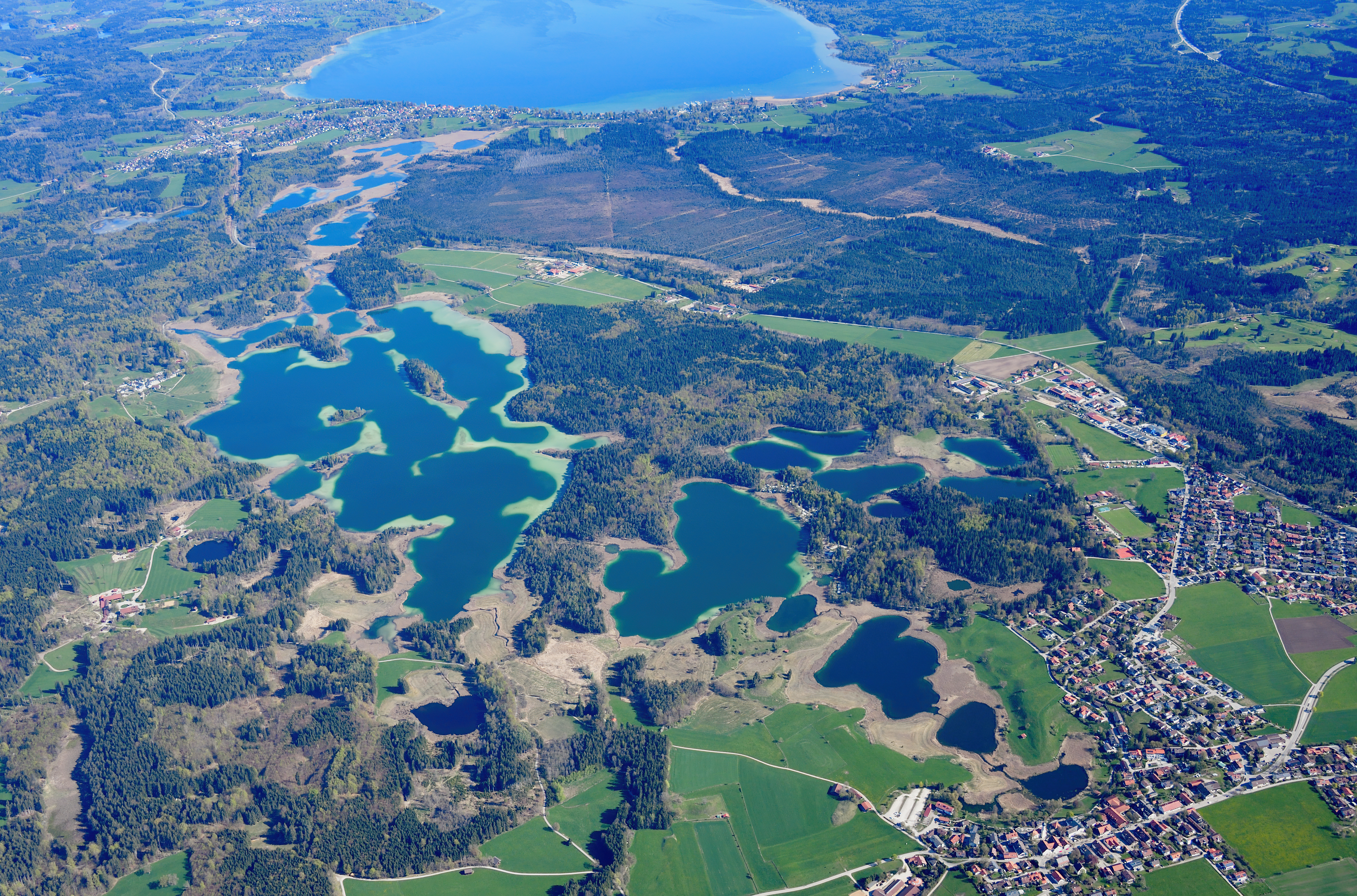

- Location within Bavaria
- Location: Bavaria
- Coordinates: 47.7903°N 11.3042°E
- Basin countries: Germany
- Max. length: 5.2 km (3.2 mi)
- Max. width: 1.0 km (0.62 mi)
- Surface area: 223.55 ha (552.4 acres)
- Average depth: 9.38 m (30.8 ft)
- Max. depth: 29.7 m (97 ft)
- Water volume: 20,975,100 m^{3} (740,730,000 cu ft)
- Surface elevation: 588 m (1,929 ft)
- Sections/sub-basins: Großer Ostersee, Waschsee, Schiffhüttensee, Sengsee, Wolfelsee, Fohnsee, Helgraben, Brückensee, Herrensee, Fischkaltersee, Bräuhaussee, Forchsee, Eishausse, Östlicher Breitenauer See, Westlicher Breitenauer See, Ameisensee, Stechsee, Lintensee, Gröbensee, Kleiner Gartensee, Großer Gartensee, Ursee, Lustsee
- Settlements: Unterlauterbach, Staltach (Iffeldorf)

Osterseen is a group of lakes in Bavaria, Germany, about 50 km (31 miles) south-south-west of Munich. At an elevation of 588 m (1,929 feet), its surface area is 223.55 ha (552.4 acres).

== Islands ==
sorted by water body:

=== Großer Ostersee ===
(islands starting from North to South)

- Holzau (6,1 hectares)
- Marieninsel (2,3 hectares, Length 440 m in north–south orientation, width up to 80 metres)
- Steigerinsel (0,45 ha), formerly Putzen Eila
- Roseninsel (0,013 ha oder 130 m^{2}, actually two very small islands)
- Schwaigerinsel (0,75 ha, 40 m distance from western bank)

=== Frechensee ===
- unnamed island, c. 20 m distance from northern bank (0,09 ha)
- unnamed island, c. 25 m from western bank (0,13 ha)

== Map ==
Map

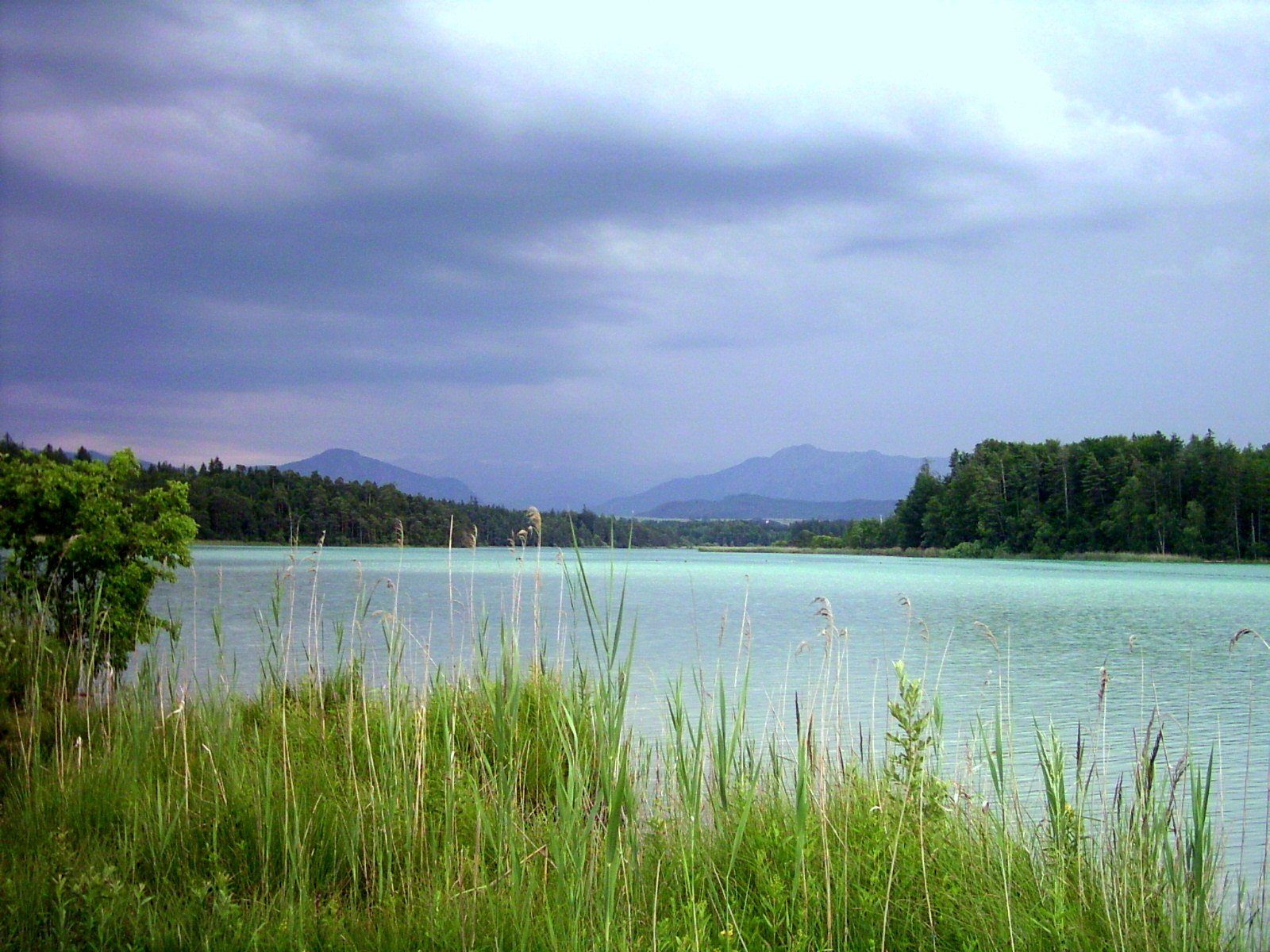
Grosser Ostersee

== See also ==
- List of lakes in Bavaria
