= Lautersee =

Lake in Bavaria, Germany

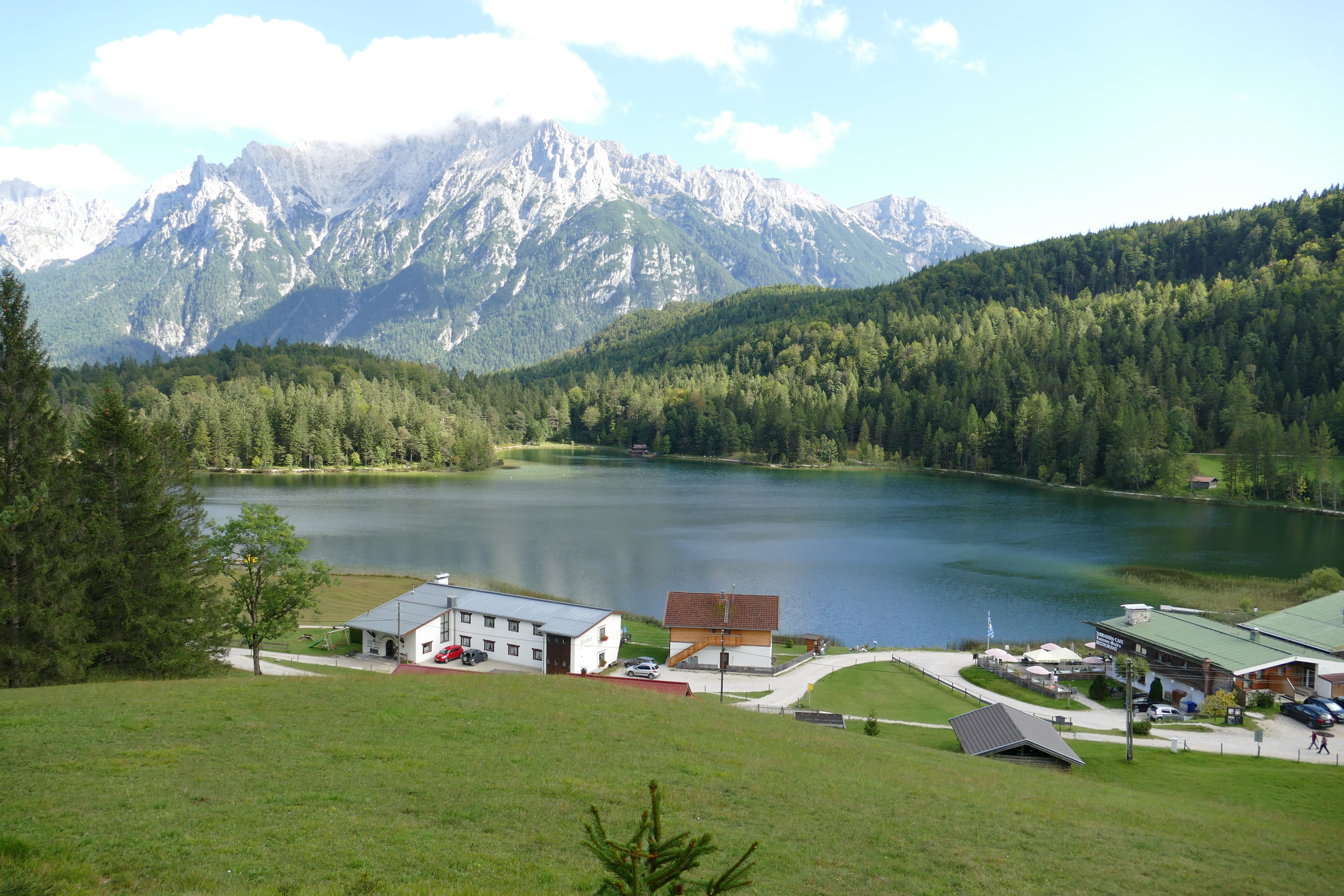

- Location within Bavaria
- Location: Oberbayern, Bavaria
- Coordinates: 47°26′19″N 11°14′7″E
- Basin countries: Germany
- Surface area: 0.146 km^{2} (0.056 sq mi)
- Max. depth: 19 m (62 ft)
- Surface elevation: 1,013 m (3,323 ft)

Lautersee is a lake in Oberbayern, Bavaria, Germany. At an elevation of 1013 m, its surface area is 0.146 km^{2}. It is situated on the southern slope of the Hoher Kranzberg above Mittenwald.
