= Wackersdorf (Verwaltungsgemeinschaft) =

- Verwaltungsgemeinschaft
- Location of Wackersdorf within Schwandorf district
- Interactive map of Wackersdorf
- Location within Germany Location within Bavaria
- Coordinates: 49°17′N 12°11′E
- Country: Germany
- State: Bavaria
- Admin. region: Upper Palatinate
- District: Schwandorf
- Seat: Wackersdorf
- Subdivisions: 2 municipalities

Area
  - Total: 53.77 km^{2} (20.76 sq mi)

Population (2025-12-31)
  - Total: 7,306
  - Density: 135.9/km^{2} (351.9/sq mi)
- Time zone: UTC+01:00 (CET)
  - Summer (DST): UTC+02:00 (CEST)
- Website: www.vg-wackersdorf.de

Wackersdorf is a Verwaltungsgemeinschaft (municipal association) in the district of Schwandorf in Bavaria, Germany. Its seat is in Wackersdorf.

It consists of the following municipalities:

1. Steinberg am See
2. Wackersdorf
