= Friedberg, Bavaria =

Friedberg
- Town
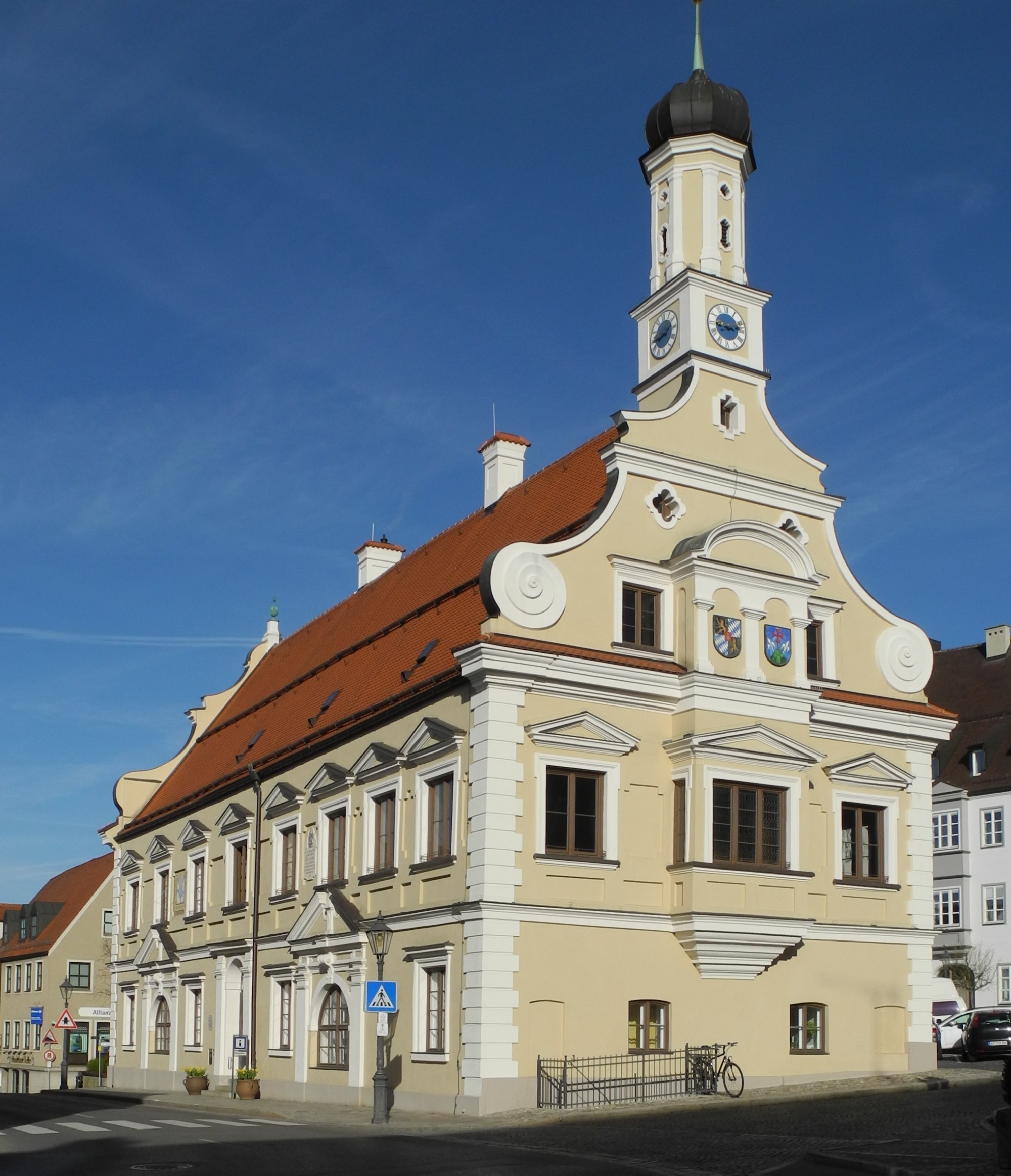
- Town hall

- Flag Coat of arms

- Location of Friedberg within Aichach-Friedberg district
- Interactive map of Friedberg
- Location within Germany Location within Bavaria
- Coordinates: 48°21′N 10°59′E
- Country: Germany
- State: Bavaria
- Admin. region: Schwaben
- District: Aichach-Friedberg
- Subdivisions: 15 Stadtteile

Government
  - Mayor (2020–26): Roland Eichmann (SPD)

Area
  - Total: 81.25 km^{2} (31.37 sq mi)
- Elevation: 514 m (1,686 ft)

Population (2025-12-31)
  - Total: 29,980
  - Density: 369.0/km^{2} (955.7/sq mi)
- Time zone: UTC+01:00 (CET)
  - Summer (DST): UTC+02:00 (CEST)
- Postal codes: 86316
- Dialling codes: 0821
- Vehicle registration: AIC, FDB
- Website: www.friedberg.de

Friedberg (German pronunciation: [ˈfʁiːtbɛʁk]) is a town in the district Aichach-Friedberg, Bavaria, Germany, with some 30,000 inhabitants. It is located next to Augsburg at the river Lech. The town was founded in the 13th century in order to collect a toll from people using the bridge across the Lech.

The town lies almost entirely on the western edge of the hills along the Lechleite, where the river Lech has formed a wide bed from glacial melt water.

== History ==
Settlements in the area of Friedberg can be traced to Roman times through archeological findings of pottery and brickworks in the Hügelshart, Rohrbach (dating from the last third of the 3rd Century AD), Stätzling (late 3rd Century to 4th Century AD) and Wulfertshausen districts.

The town is mentioned in historical documents for the first time in letter of protection from Conrad of the House of Hohenstaufen together with Duke Ludwig II, also called "the Strict", of Bavaria and the Burghers of Augsburg, in 1264. The Fridberch castle was subsequently built to serve as a border security and customs post for the Duchy of Bavaria, but put the town in opposition to the free city of Augsburg. The castle was the cause of the first burning of Friedberg by Augsburg in 1396. The town was subject to the many frequent wars between Swabia, Bavaria and Augsburg.

In 1485 Balthasar Hubmaier, a leading figure of the Anabaptist Reformation, was born in the town.

A revival in the town's fortunes came when, in 1568, the Duchess Christine chose Friedberg castle as her seat following her husband's death. The town became the centre of Bavarian court life, but was short lived when the town was ravaged by the plague in 1599. More suffering came as the town was sacked twice by the Swedes during the Thirty Years War. After the war only the town hall, castle and city walls were left standing. The town was soon flourishing again as the Dukes of Bavaria encouraged artisans to settle in the area with the establishment of guilds in neighbouring Augsburg. Due to overcrowding, Friedberg offered accommodation to those displaced artisans who could not find rooms in Augsburg, and were not yet Master Craftsmen.

The Pilgrimage church of "Our Lord's Rest", the Herrgottsruh, was built in 1753, is considered one of the most beautiful churches of the Bavarian rococo.

The town survived World War II virtually unscathed.

== Town structure ==
Friedberg currently consists of 22 districts:

- Bachern
- Bestihof
- Derching
- Dickelsmoor
- Friedberg
- Gagers
- Griesbachmühle
- Haberskirch
- Harthausen
- Heimatshausen
- Hügelshart
- Ottmaring
- Ottoried
- Paar
- Rederzhausen
- Rettenberg
- Rinnenthal
- Rohrbach
- Stätzling
- Wiffertshausen
- Wittenberg
- Wulfertshausen

== Neighboring communities ==
Adjacent to the town are Augsburg, Affing, Obergriesbach, Dasing, Adelzhausen, Eurasburg, Ried and Kissing.

== Governance ==
The Town council is constituted by the First Mayor, as of 2022 Roland Eichmann (SPD), and thirty Aldermen.

The breakdown of votes in the 2020 elections was as follows:

- CSU (Christlich Soziale Union in Bayern) – 39.14%
- SPD (Sozialdemokratische Partei Deutschlands Bayern) – 17.55%
- Grüne (Bündnis 90/Die Grünen) – 16.66%
- Parteifreie – 8.99%
- Freie Wähler – 8.94%
- FDP (Freie Demokratische Partei in Bayern) – 3.88%
- ÖDP (Ökologisch-Demokratische Partei) – 4.83%

== Economy and infrastructure ==
The economic situation in Friedberg currently relies mainly on the retail trade as well as the furniture store Segmüller, which maintains its principal office and upholstered furniture factory in Friedberg.

=== Local transport links ===
- Highway (Autobahn) A8 Stuttgart-Ulm-Augsburg-Munich
- Federal route 2 (Bundesstraße – "Romantic Road")
- Federal route 300 Augsburg-Regensburg-Schrobenhausen-Aichach

=== Public transport ===
- Friedberg is on the railway line from Augsburg to Ingolstadt (Valley Railway).
- Since 12 December 2010, the Tram line No' 6 of the Augsburg Transport Company runs from the Augsburg Main Station to the Augsburg textile district, Herrenbach and Hochzoll to Friedberg West.
- The bus route 200 connects the inner town (Friedberg East – South Friedberg – Friedberg station – Friedberg West) with both the Valley Railway and the tram line No' 6.
- In addition, many regional bus lines are run by the GCU Friedberger Stadtbegiet in the neighborhoods and the surrounding region.

=== Schools ===
- 2 Elementary schools
- One Special school
- 1 Middle School
- One High school(Konradin school)
- One Grammar school(Grammar School Friedberg)
- A Technical secondary school
- A Vocational secondary school

== Arts and culture ==
=== Museums ===
- Castle museum with many well-preserved Friedberg watches.

=== Buildings ===
- Friedberg castle (built in 1257, 99% of the current building is from the 16th century)
- Town Hall (c. 1680), built by a disciple of Elias Holl
- Parish Church of St. Jacob (1871–1872)
- Pilgrimage Church "Our Lord's Rest" (1731–1753), a Bavarian rococo structure.
- Marian fountain on Marienplatz commemorating the Plague (1600)
- Church of St. Stephen, (1698)
- Church of St. Afra in the Field (1710). At this place it is said St Afra was martyred.
- Pilgrimage chapel Maria Alber (1686)
- Historical city walls (1409)
- Pallottine Church with a plaque for the pacifists and Pallottiner Father Franz Reinisch, who refused the oath to Hitler and was therefore murdered in 1942 in Brandenburg-Gorden

=== Regular events ===
- Friedberger time (also called Old Town Festival), a historical event in Swabia. Held every three years, next due date is 2016th (8 to 17 July).
- Skatertag (each on a Sunday, late May)
- Christmas market "Friedberger Advent"
- Friedberger folk and folk festival, beginning of year to mid-August at the Festival Square
- Friedberger music competition in the "Friedberger School of Music," sponsored by the Lions Club
- Open market sale Sunday, 4 times a year (March Judikamarkt, June Johannimarkt, September: Matthew market, November: Martin's Market) in the old Friedberger
- Soap Box Derby
- Friedberger Half Marathon in September, first performed in 2003

=== Sports ===
- The men's team of volleyball players of TSV Friedberg plays in the second German Volleyball League.
- The men's team handball players of the TSV Friedberg plays in the third Liga.
- Since 2009, the TSV Friedberg an extremely successful sports acrobatics group.
- On the outskirts of Friedberg is the Friedberger Stretch (Size: 450 x 430 m, surface water: about 18 ha) with water skiing, parking, large lawns, beach volleyball, children's beach, toilets, restaurant, kiosk and lifeguard station are available.
- In addition, there are two local football teams Friedberg: TSV Friedberg and Sportfreunde Friedberg.

== Notable people ==
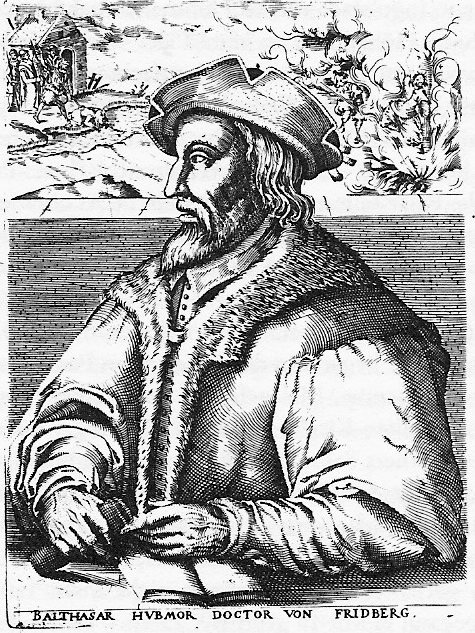
Balthasar Hubmaier

- Afra of Augsburg (died 304), Christian martyr (in the area of the today's town)
- Balthasar Hubmaier (1485–1528), Catholic priest, Waldshuter reformer and leading figure of the Baptist movement
- Ginther Anton (1655–1725), Catholic author and dean of sacred works
- Karl Klocker (1748–1805), Benedictine monk and abbot of the monastery last Benediktbeuern
- Hans Segmüller, founder of the eponymous company facility
- Anton Losinger (born 1957), bishop
- Michael Fuchs-Gamböck (born 1965), editor and author
- Firat Arslan (born 1970), Turkish-German boxer

=== Honorary citizens ===
- 1860: Aries Caesar, Queen's county judge
- 1888: Friedrich Bilabel, Papyrologist and archeologist.
- 1913: Kaspar Wieland, First Mayor and Member of Parliament
- 1916: Josef Probst, Royal. Parish priest and spiritual advice
- 1920: Charles focal spot, the district magistrate
- 1930: Robert Hartl, honorary mayor and district Fire Chief
- 1957: Karl Lindner, first Mayor and District Alderman
- 1972: Christian Wall Reiter, director of the Bavarian Radio
- 1991: Georg Fendt, Member of Parliament and 2 Mayor
- 2004: Albert Kling, a former first Mayor

== Twin towns – sister cities ==
Friedberg is twinned with:

- Bressuire, France
- Chippenham, England, United Kingdom
- Friedberg, Austria
- La Crosse, United States
- Völs am Schlern, Italy

The streets Chippenham-Ring, La Crosse Ring, and Bressuire-Ring, which run through Friedberg, are named after three of its twinned towns.

== See also ==
Derchinger Baggersee

== Sources ==
- Franz Schaffer, Horst Güttler: Sozialtopographie der Altstadt: die Bevölkerungsentwicklung bei Deutschen und Ausländern, eine Kartendokumentation über den Altstadtbereich von Friedberg, Bayern. Augsburg 1982.
- Karen Eva Noetzel: Friedberg im Nationalsozialismus: ein Stadtführer. Friedberg 2005.
- Karen Ostertag, Manfred Dilling: Stadt-Ansichten Friedberg. Text: Hubert Raab, Augsburg 1986.
- Regine Nägele: Die Friedberger Mozartin. Friedberg 2005.
- Sebastian Hiereth: Die Landgerichte Friedberg und Mering. Historischer Atlas von Bayern / Teil Schwaben, 1. München: Kommission für bayerische Landesgeschichte 1952.
- Wolfgang Wüst: Friedberg als bayerische Landstadt, in: Stadtbuch Friedberg, Bd. 1, hrsg. v. Stadt Friedberg, Friedberg/Bayern 1991, S. 192–211.
