= Kirchsee (Bavaria) =

Lake in Germany

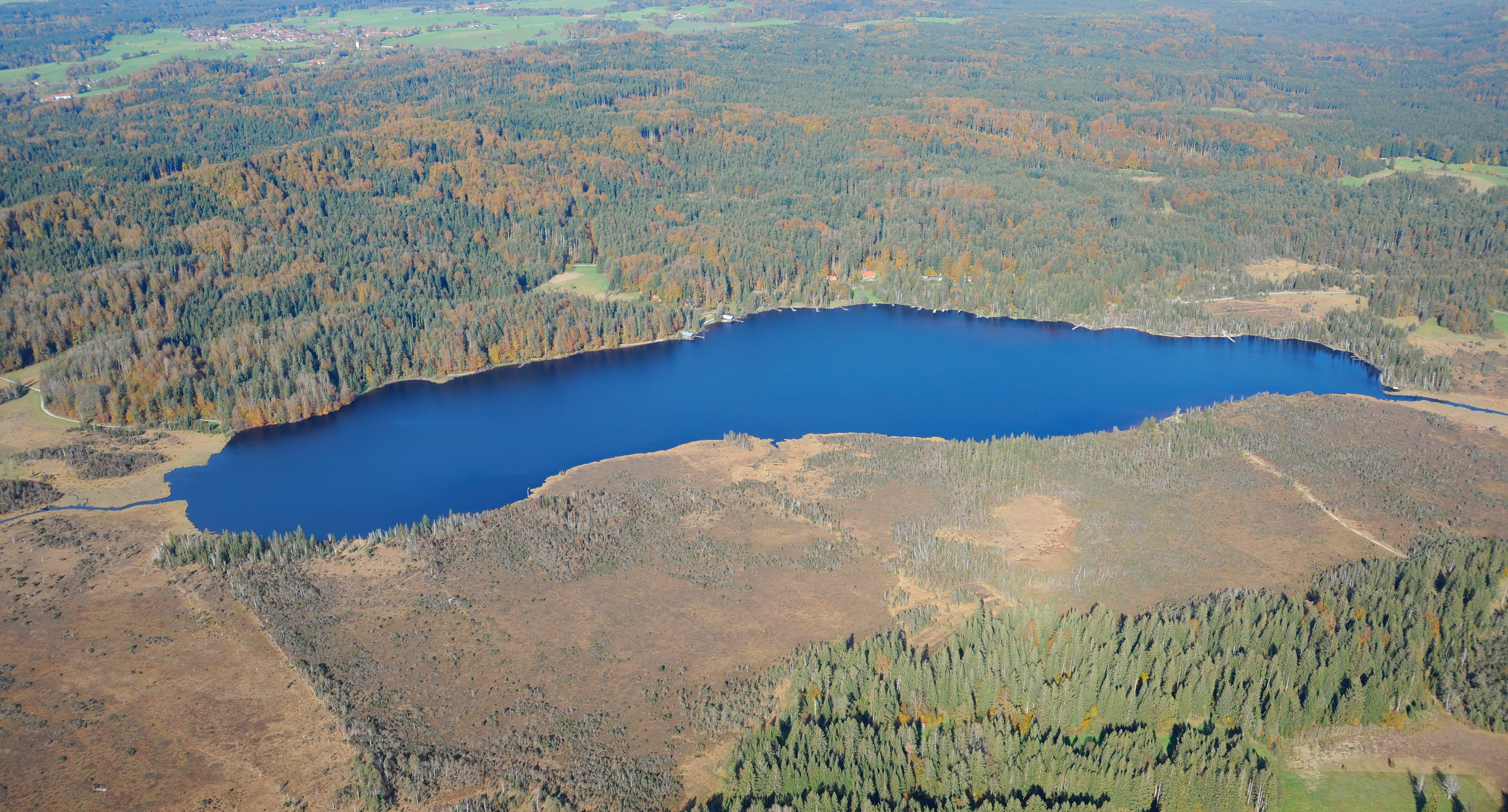
- Aerial view of Kirchsee from the south

- Location within Bavaria
- Location: Upper_Bavaria
- Coordinates: 47°49′08″N 11°37′05″E
- Primary inflows: Laubach
- Primary outflows: Kirchseebach
- Basin countries: Germany
- Surface area: 0.42 km^{2} (0.16 sq mi)
- Max. depth: 16 m (52 ft)
- Surface elevation: 699 m (2,293 ft)

The Kirchsee is a lake in Upper Bavaria which is located nearby the Kloster Reutberg monastery and brewery in the Sachsenkam municipality, about 30 km (19 mi) south of Munich.

== Description ==
The moor lake which has a maximum depth of 16 m is part of the Ellbach- und Kirchseemoor Naturschutzgebiet (nature reserve) and is a popular bathing water and recreation area for the region and Munich. The lake is certified according to the EU directive for bathing waters, has an excellent water quality (German grade Güteklasse I), and is supplied with relatively warm moor water. The north shore has two bathing areas, a kiosk and toilets as well as a chargeable parking site. The south shore has a bathing area which is only accessible on foot or by bike after a 20 minutes walk (1.6 km (0.99 mi)) from the Kloster Reutberg monastery, which also has a parking site. In winter, the lake is a popular meeting place for ice skating und curling.

== See also ==
- List of lakes in Bavaria
