= Konstanzer Ach =

River in Germany

- The Konstanzer Ach in Immenstadt

Location
- Country: Germany
- State: Bavaria

Physical characteristics
- Mouth
  - location: Iller
  - coordinates: 47.5685°N 10.2336°E
- Length: 21.3 km (13.2 mi)

Basin features
- Progression: Iller→ Danube→ Black Sea

Konstanzer Ach is a river of Bavaria, Germany. It passes through the Großer Alpsee, and flows into the Iller in Immenstadt.

== See also ==
- List of rivers of Bavaria
