= Murner See =

Lake in Wackersdorf, Bavaria, Germany

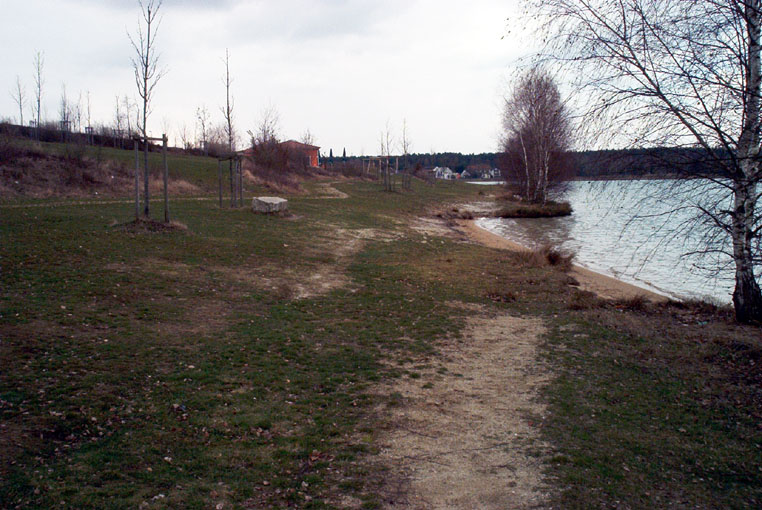

- Location within Bavaria
- Location: Wackersdorf, Bavaria
- Coordinates: 49°20′57″N 12°12′16″E
- Primary inflows: none
- Primary outflows: none
- Basin countries: Germany
- Surface area: 0.94 km^{2} (0.36 sq mi)
- Max. depth: 50 m (160 ft)
- Surface elevation: 395 m (1,296 ft)

Murner See is a lake in Wackersdorf, Bavaria, Germany. At an elevation of 395 m, its surface area is 0.94 km^{2}.
