= Ferchensee =

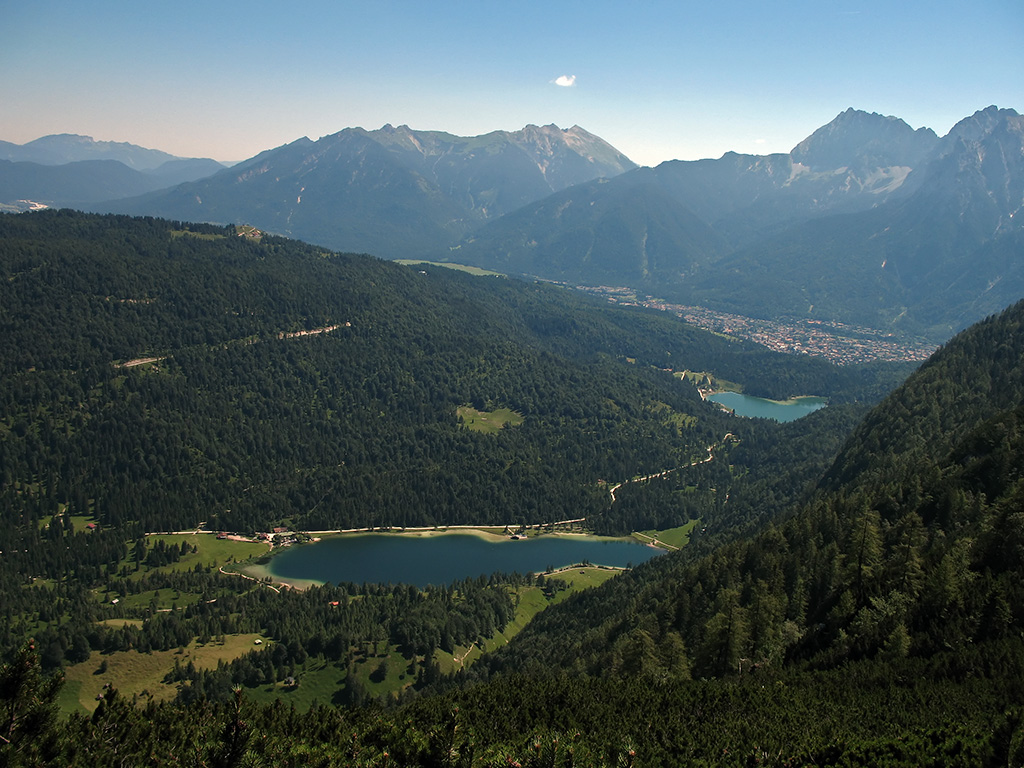

- Location within Bavaria
- Location: Oberbayern, Bavaria
- Coordinates: 47°26′21″N 11°12′53″E
- Basin countries: Germany
- Max. depth: 20 m (66 ft)
- Surface elevation: 1,060 m (3,480 ft)

Ferchensee is a lake in Oberbayern, Bavaria, Germany, located at an elevation of 1060 metres. It is currently ranked #2 of 15 things to do in Mittenwald on TripAdvisor.
