= Stempflesee =

Lake in Bavaria, Germany

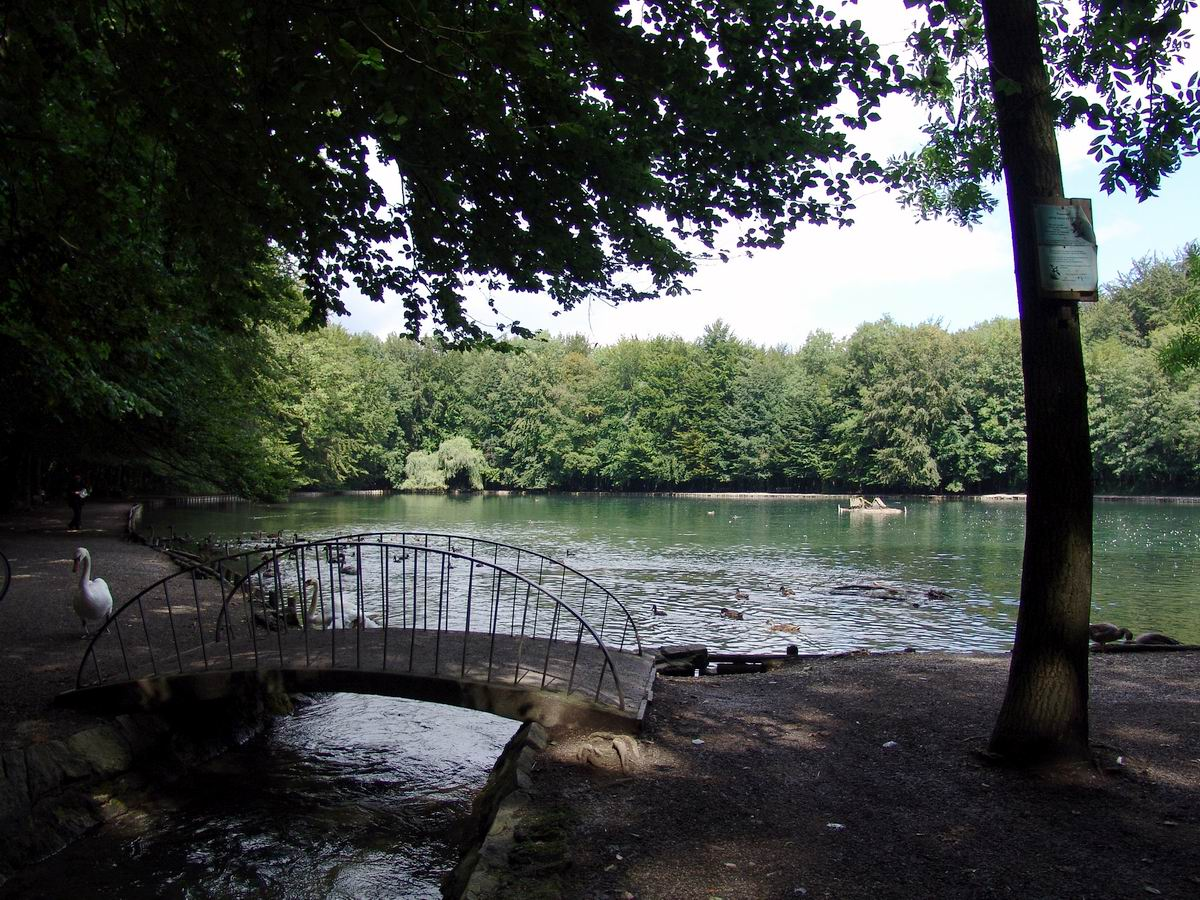

- Location within Bavaria
- Location: Augsburg-Haunstetten, Swabia, Bavaria
- Coordinates: 48.339228°N 10.917747°E
- Basin countries: Germany
- Surface area: 1.4 ha (3.5 acres)
- Settlements: Augsburg

Stempflesee is an artificial lake in Augsburg-Haunstetten, Swabia, Bavaria, Germany. Its surface area is 0. 014 km^{2}.
