= Großer Alpsee =

Lake in Swabia, Bavaria, Germany

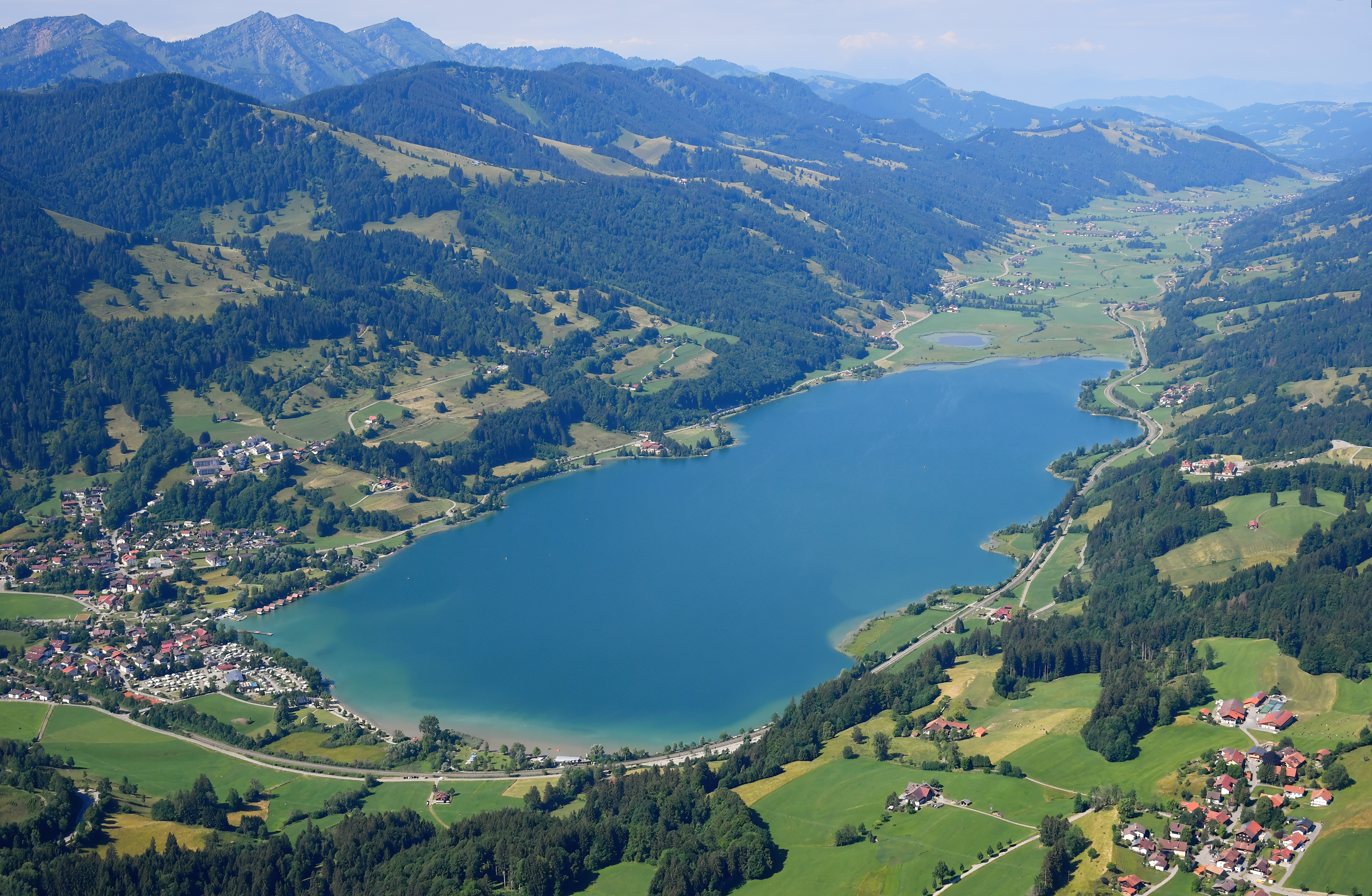

- Location within Bavaria
- Location: Swabia, Bavaria
- Coordinates: 47°34′20″N 10°10′30″E
- Primary inflows: Konstanzer Ach
- Primary outflows: Konstanzer Ach
- Basin countries: Germany
- Surface area: 247.3 ha (611 acres)
- Max. depth: 22.7 m (74 ft)
- Water volume: 32,680,000 m^{3} (1.154×10^{9} cu ft)
- Shore length^{1}: 8.1 km (5.0 mi)
- Surface elevation: 724.63 m (2,377.4 ft)
- ^{1} Shore length is not a well-defined measure.

Großer Alpsee is a lake in Swabia, Bavaria, Germany. At an elevation of 724,63 m, its surface area is 247.3 ha.
