= Ilsesee =

Lake near Augsburg, Germany

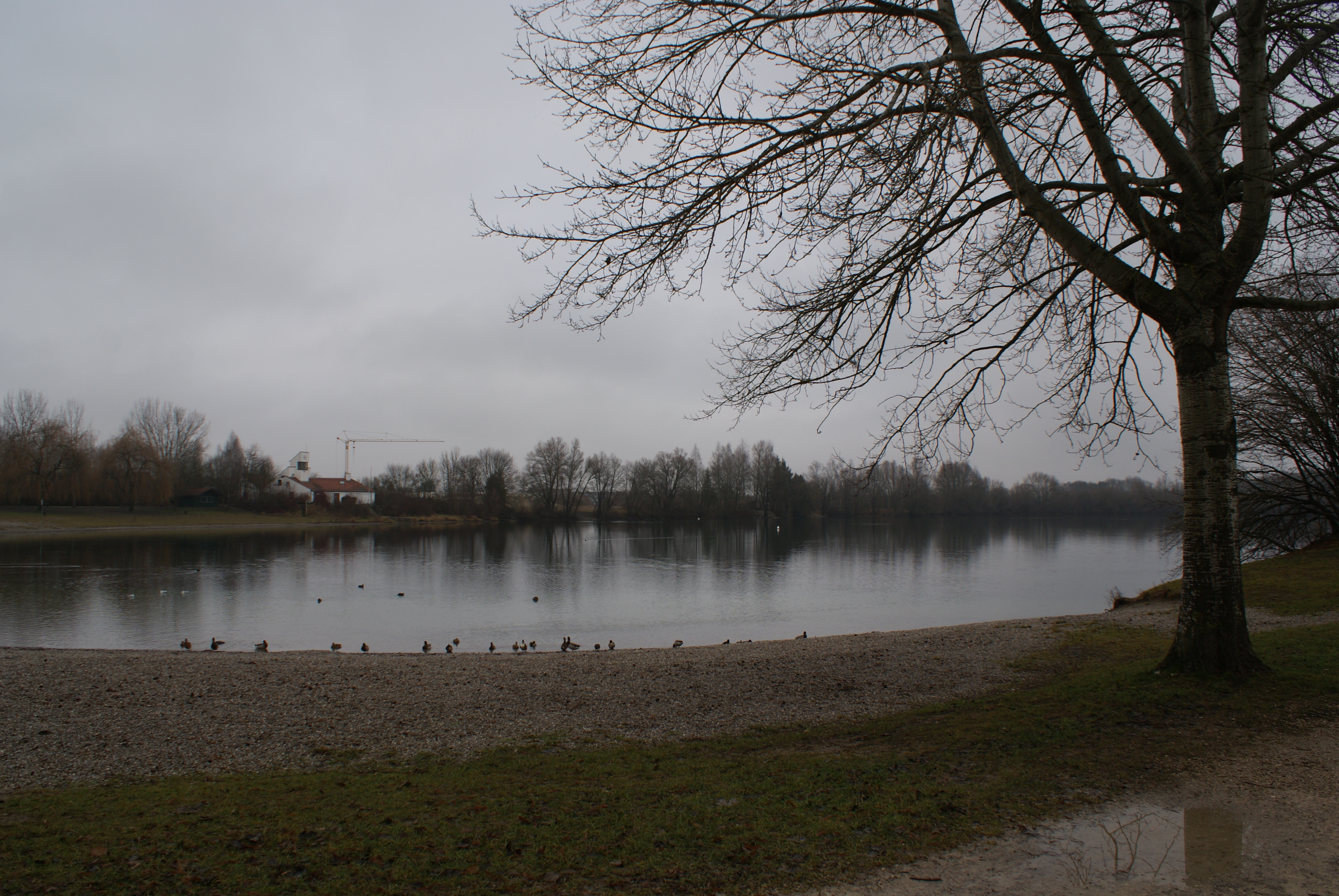

- Location within Bavaria
- Location: Augsburg, Bavaria
- Coordinates: 48°16′56″N 10°54′2″E
- Primary inflows: groundwater, precipitation
- Primary outflows: Grundwasser
- Basin countries: Germany
- Max. length: ca. 400 m (1,300 ft)
- Max. width: 270 m (890 ft)
- Surface area: ca. 12 ha (30 acres)
- Max. depth: ca. 15 m (49 ft)
- Settlements: Augsburg

Ilsesee is a lake in Augsburg, Bavaria, Germany. At an elevation of, its surface area is ca. 12 ha.
