= Weitmannsee =

Lake in Germany

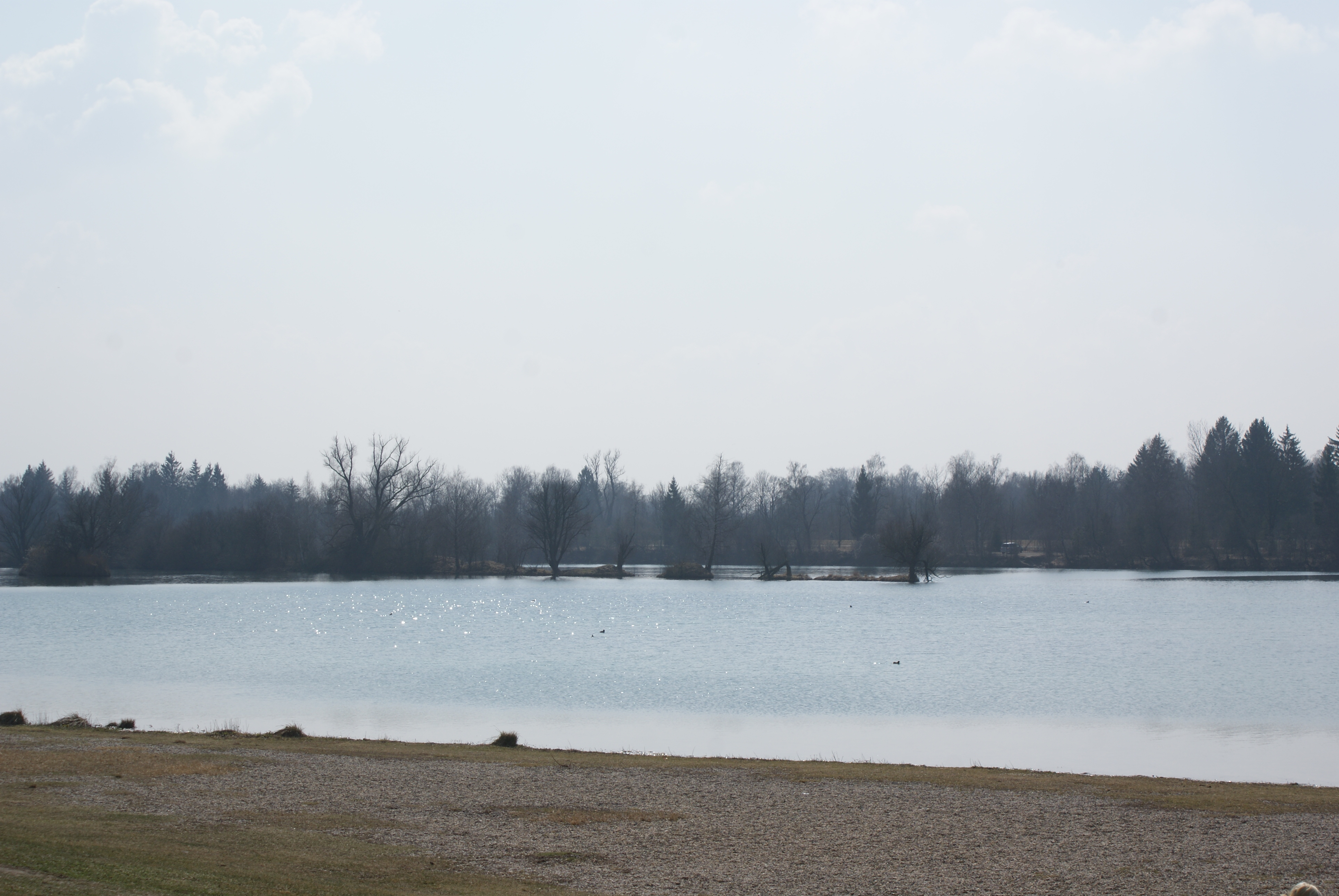

- Location within Bavaria
- Location: Swabia, Bavaria
- Coordinates: 48°17′13.48″N 10°57′2.24″E
- Primary inflows: groundwater, precipitation
- Primary outflows: groundwater
- Basin countries: Germany
- Max. length: ca. 1,150 m (3,770 ft)
- Max. width: 330 m (1,080 ft)
- Surface area: 33 ha (82 acres)
- Surface elevation: 501 m (1,644 ft)
- Settlements: Kissing, Mering

Weitmannsee is a lake in Swabia, Bavaria, Germany. At an elevation of 501 m, its surface area is 33 ha. It is between 3 and 6 meters deep and has lots of small islands. It is a popular recreational area with a restaurant, a volleyball court, a playground and many benches along the trails. To go around the lake takes around 45 minutes. The lake is very popular for swimming in summer but often has problems with its water quality.
