= Sarchinger Weiher =

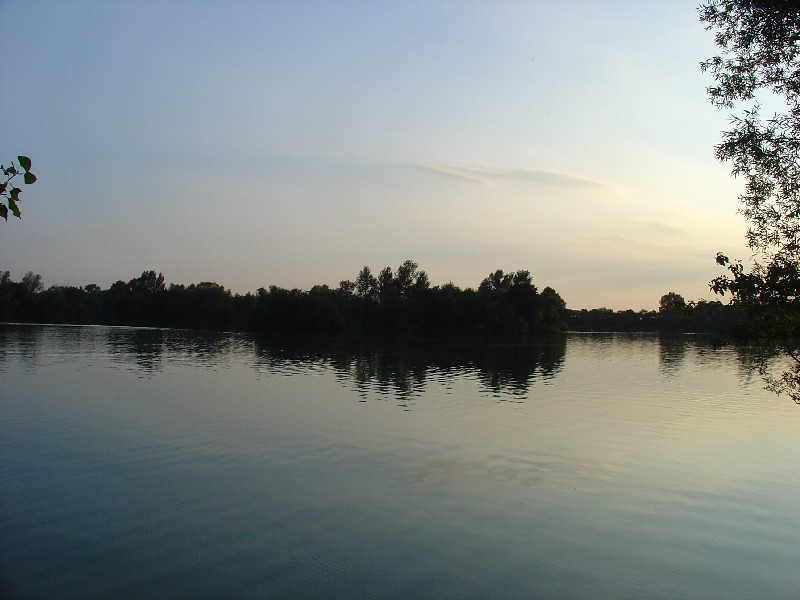

- Location within Bavaria
- Location: Landkreis Regensburg, Bavaria
- Coordinates: 49°0′27.72″N 12°15′9.01″E
- Basin countries: Germany
- Surface area: 28 ha (69 acres)
- Max. depth: 7 m (23 ft)
- Surface elevation: 330 m (1,080 ft)

Sarchinger Weiher is a lake in Landkreis Regensburg, Bavaria, Germany. At an elevation of 330 metres, its surface area is 0.28 square kilometers.

The lake is a flooded gravel-pit. In the surrounding area, there are several small lakes created by gravel quarrying.

The north-western, north-eastern, and south-western banks were filled up with sand to create a beach and make the water shallow for children. On these banks, there are also kiosks, lavatories and official fireplaces for barbecues. The further lakesides are planted with trees and shrubs to provide sufficient shade.

In the middle of the southern half of the lake, there is a small island which over the last years and decades became a breeding zone for rare birds, e.g. the black-crowned Night Heron. The island is still freely accessible.
