= Fridolfinger See =

Lake in Fridolfing, Bavaria, Germany

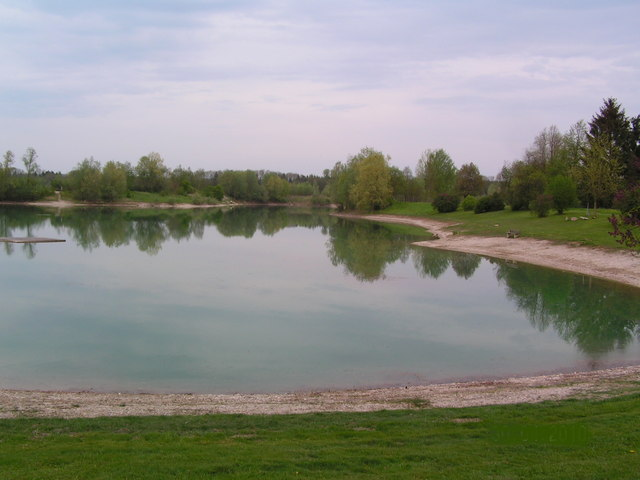

- Location within Bavaria
- Location: Alpine foothills, Bavaria
- Coordinates: 47°59′45″N 12°50′28″E
- Primary inflows: none
- Primary outflows: none
- Basin countries: Germany
- Surface area: 3 ha (7.4 acres)
- Max. depth: 5 m (16 ft)

Fridolfinger See is a lake in the Alpine foothills, Bavaria, Germany. Its surface area is 3 ha (7.4 acres).
