= Radersdorfer Baggersee =

Lake in Germany

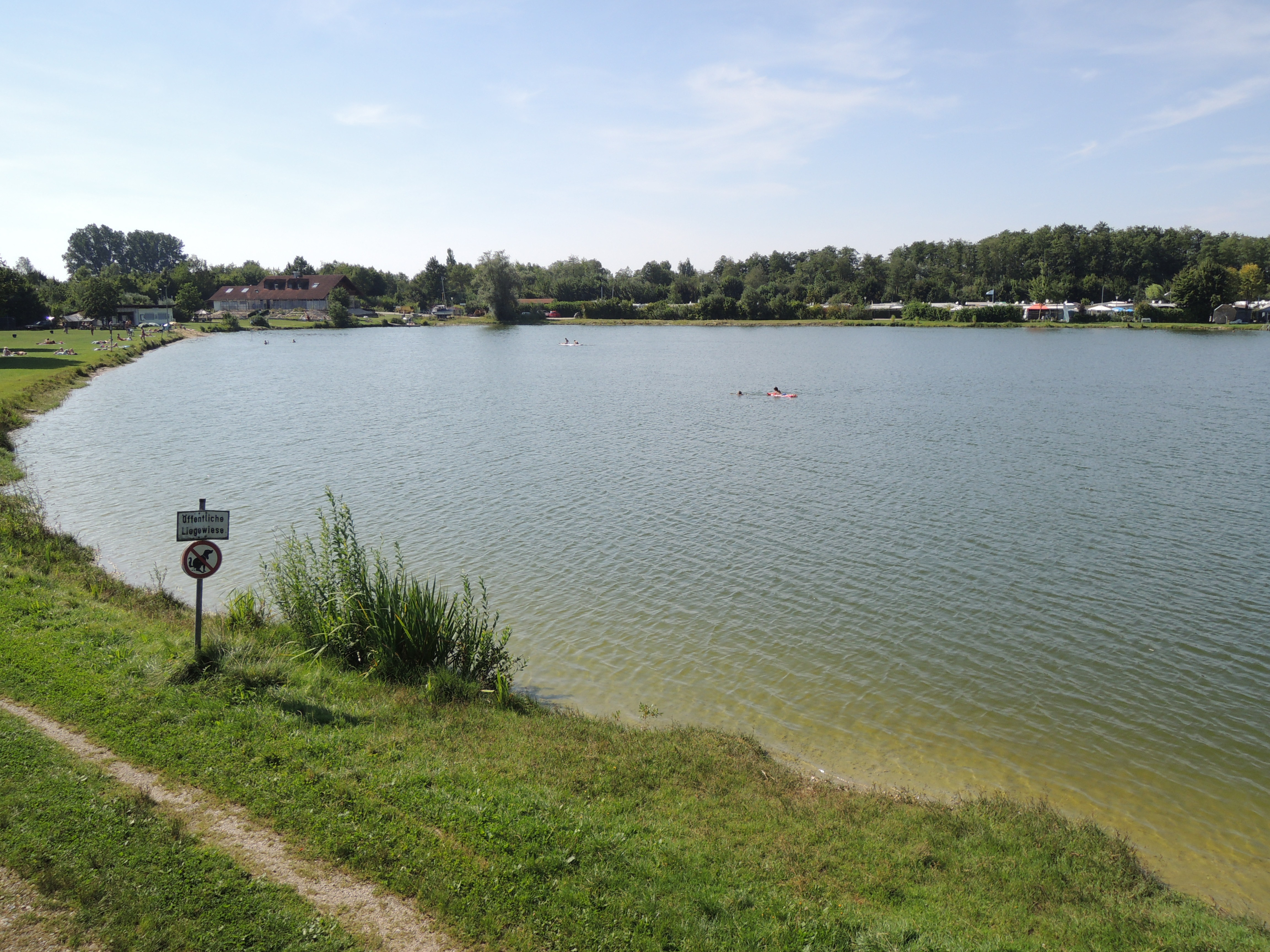

- Location within Bavaria
- Location: Swabia, Bavaria
- Coordinates: 48°30′30.51″N 11°9′35.56″E
- Primary inflows: groundwater, precipitation
- Primary outflows: groundwater
- Basin countries: Germany
- Max. length: ca. 370 m (1,210 ft)
- Max. width: 160 m (520 ft)
- Surface area: 5 ha (12 acres)
- Surface elevation: 447 m (1,467 ft)
- Settlements: Kühbach, Inchenhofen

Radersdorfer Baggersee is a lake in Swabia, Bavaria, Germany. At an elevation of 447 m, its surface area is 5 ha.
