= Derchinger Baggersee =

Lake in Bavaria, Germany

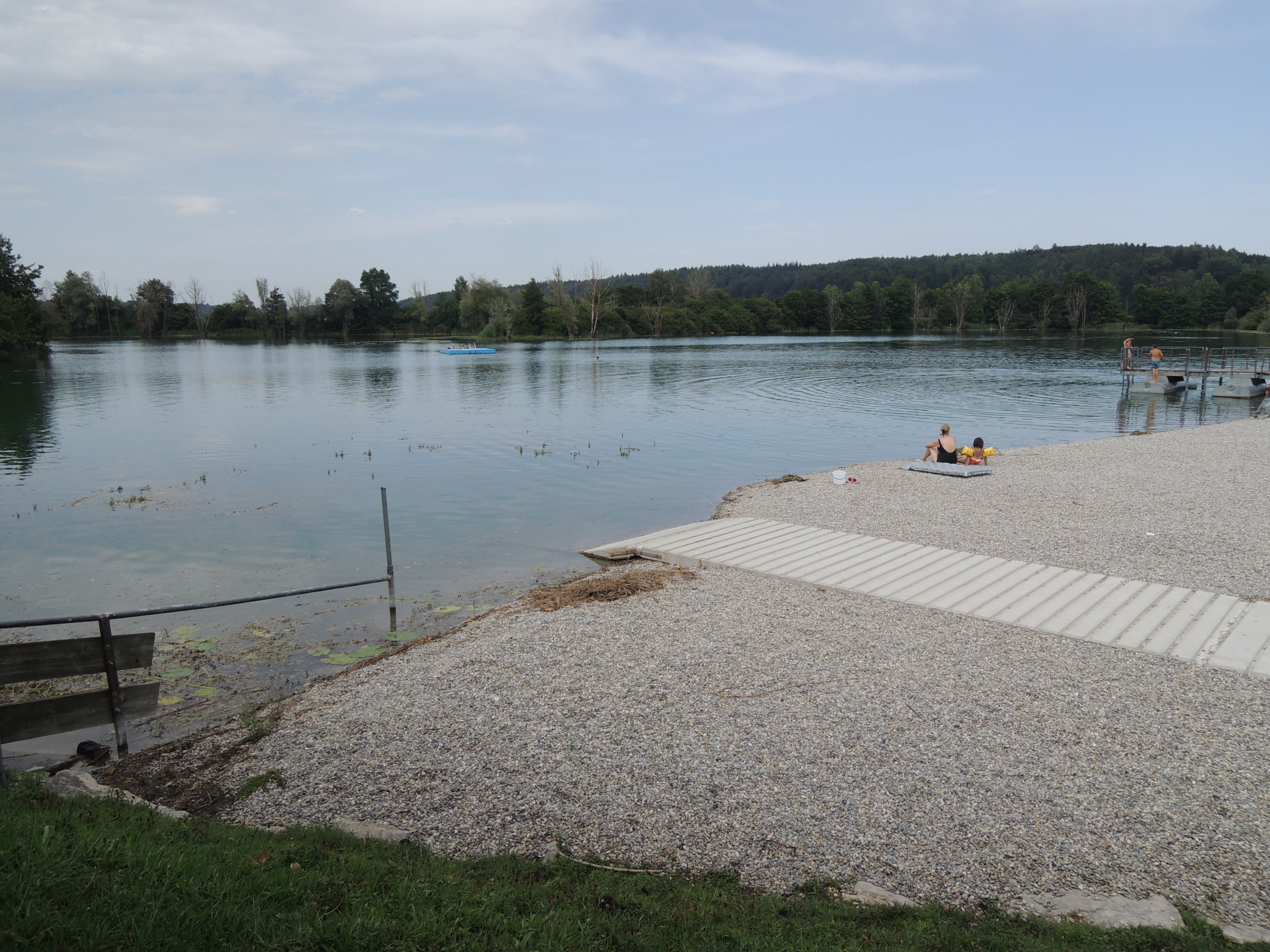
- Derchinger Baggersee

- Location within Bavaria
- Location: Swabia, Bavaria
- Coordinates: 48°24′53.45″N 10°57′30.98″E
- Primary inflows: groundwater, precipitation
- Primary outflows: groundwater
- Basin countries: Germany
- Max. length: ca. 370 m (1,210 ft)
- Max. width: 320 m (1,050 ft)
- Surface area: 6 ha (15 acres)
- Surface elevation: 464 m (1,522 ft)
- Settlements: Friedberg-Derching

Derchinger Baggersee is a lake in Swabia, Bavaria, Germany. At an elevation of 464 m, its surface area is 6 ha.
