= Hoher Kranzberg (Wetterstein) =

Coordinates: 47°27′10″N 11°13′26″E

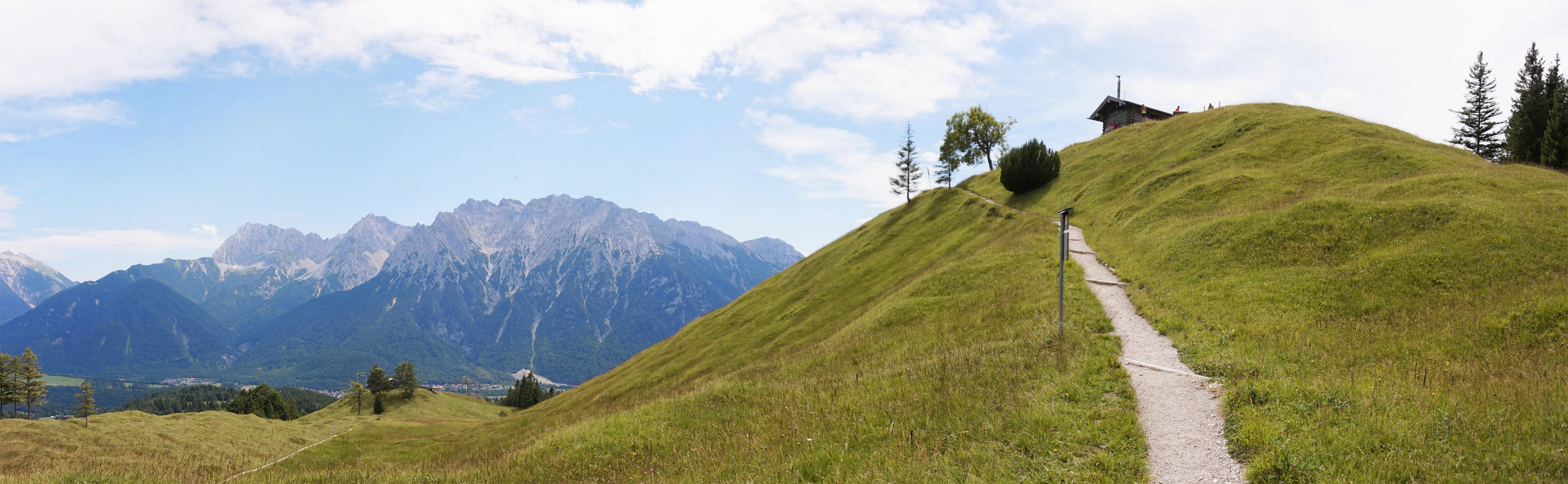

Highest point
- Elevation: 1,391 m (4,564 ft)

Geography
- Location: Bavaria, Germany

The Hoher Kranzberg is a mountain in Bavaria, Germany. Compared to its neighbours in the Wetterstein Mountains and the Karwendel Mountains, the Hoher Kranzberg is more of a gentle grass hill.
