= Kaisersee =

Lake in Germany

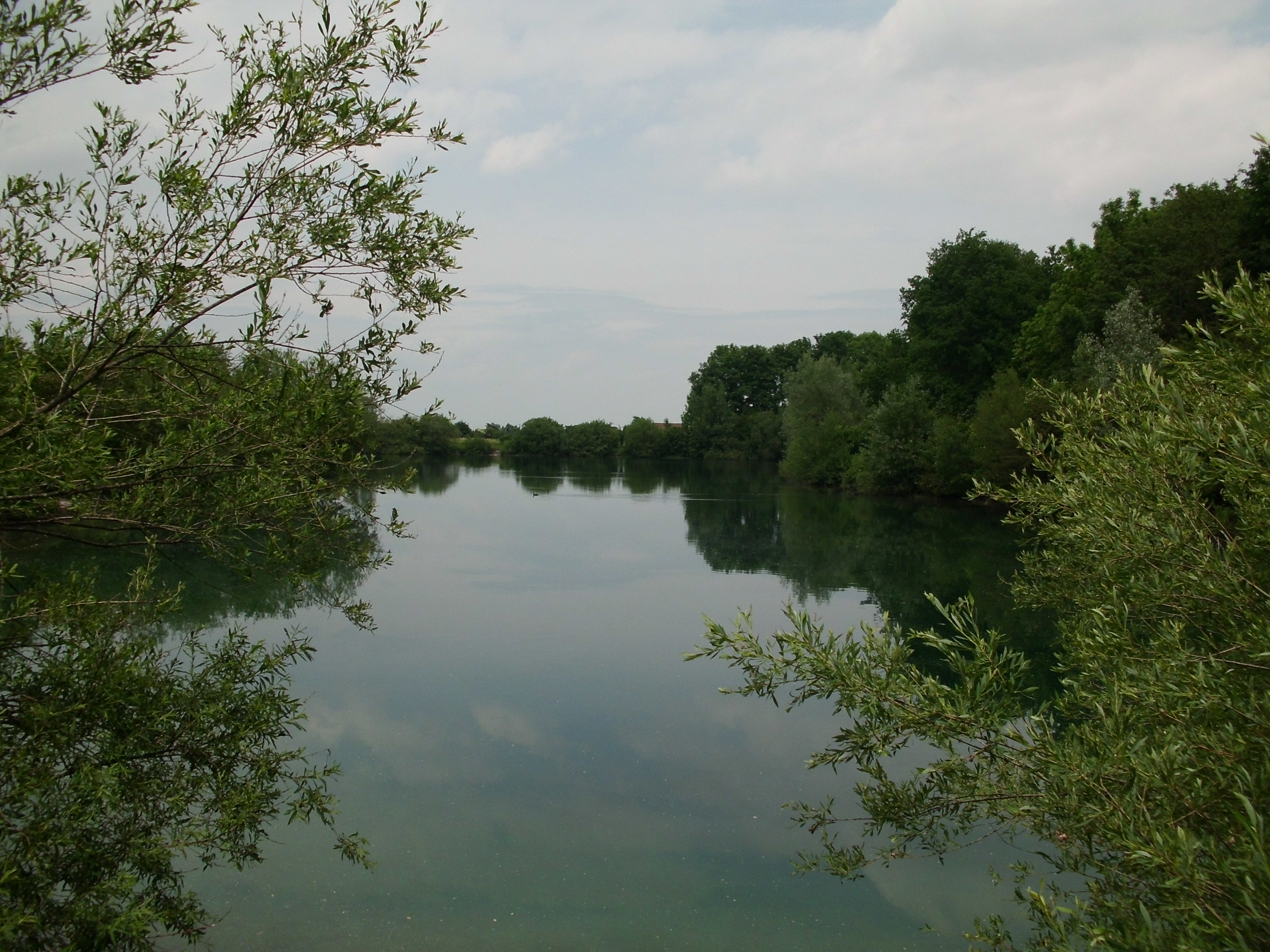
- picture of the lake.

- Location within Bavaria
- Location: Augsburg, Swabia, Bavaria
- Coordinates: 48°25′9.37″N 10°55′3.05″E
- Primary inflows: groundwater, precipitation
- Primary outflows: groundwater
- Basin countries: Germany
- Max. length: ca. 300 m (980 ft)
- Max. width: 200 m (660 ft)
- Surface area: 4 ha (9.9 acres)
- Max. depth: ca. 4 m (13 ft)
- Settlements: Augsburg

Kaisersee is a lake in Augsburg, Schwaben, Bavaria, Germany. Its surface area is 4 ha.
