= Steinberger See =

Lake in Germany

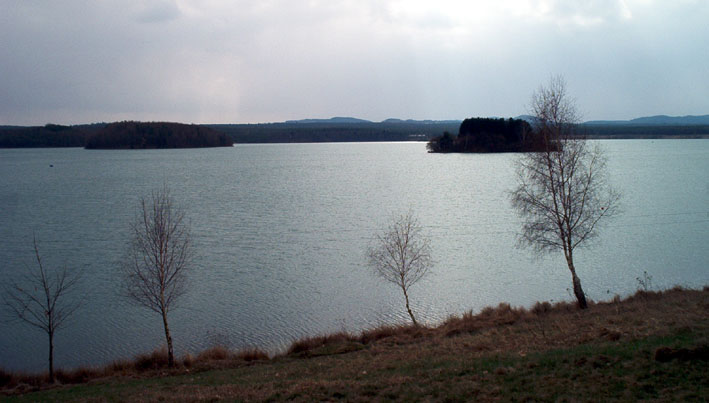

- Location within Bavaria
- Location: Bavaria
- Coordinates: 49°16′47″N 12°09′45″E
- Primary inflows: none
- Primary outflows: none
- Basin countries: Germany
- Surface area: 1.84 km^{2} (0.71 sq mi)
- Max. depth: ca. 60 m (200 ft)
- Surface elevation: 364 m (1,194 ft)

Steinberger See (German pronunciation: [ˈʃtaɪnbɛʁɡɐ ˈzeː]) is a lake in Bavaria, Germany. At an elevation of 364 m, its surface area is 1.84 km^{2}. Situated in SSE Germany, It is home to its own water skiing place.
