= Niedersonthofener See =

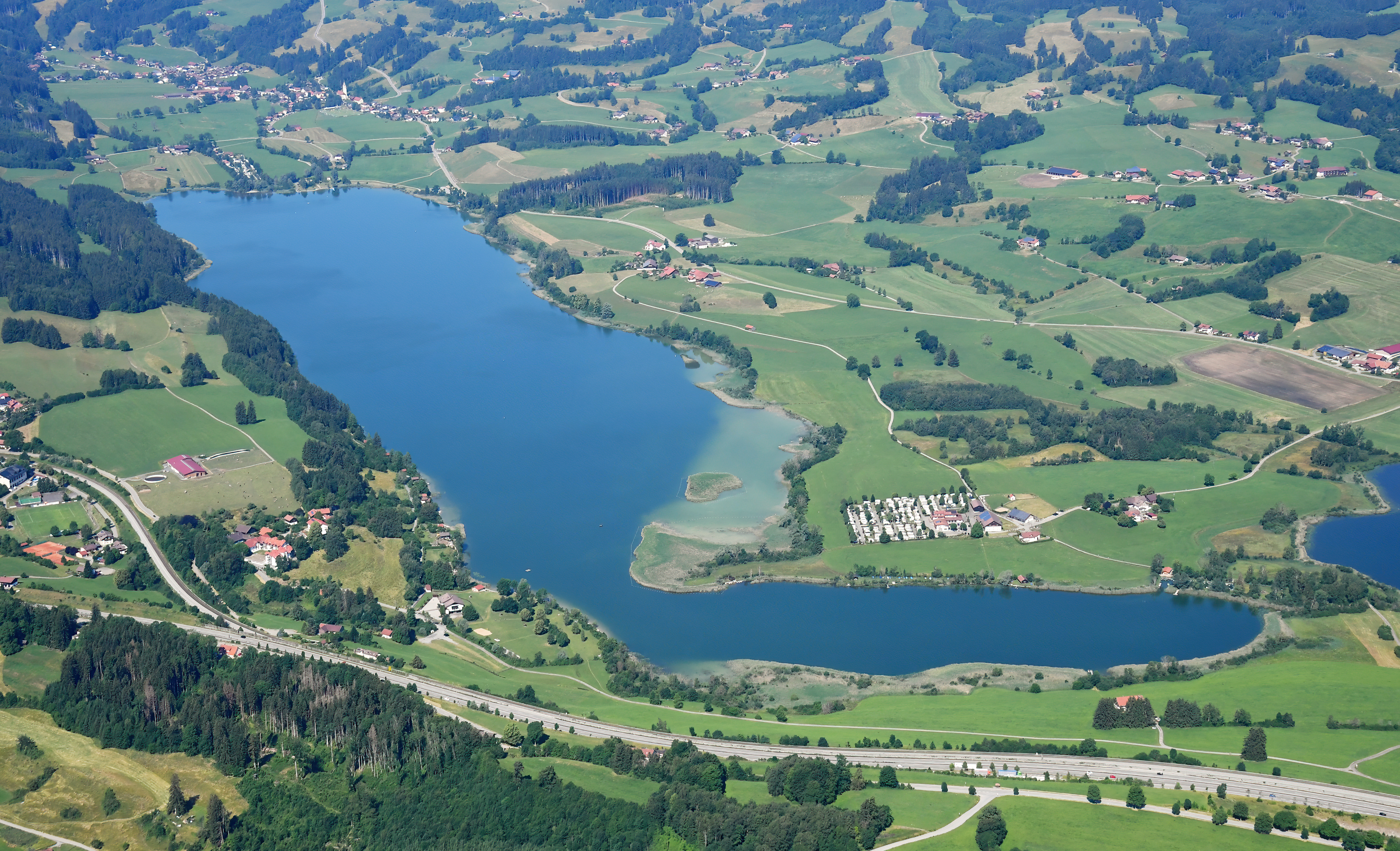

- Location within Bavaria
- Location: Oberallgäu, Bavaria
- Coordinates: 47°38′5.91″N 10°15′53.41″E
- Primary inflows: Dorfbach, Schrattenbach, Hasenhohbach, Seebach
- Basin countries: Germany
- Max. length: 2.8 km (1.7 mi)
- Max. width: 550 m (1,800 ft)
- Surface area: 135.30 ha (334.3 acres)
- Average depth: 10 m (33 ft)
- Max. depth: 21.3 m (70 ft)
- Water volume: 13,500,000 m^{3} (480,000,000 cu ft)
- Surface elevation: 703.30 m (2,307.4 ft)

Niedersonthofener See is a lake in Oberallgäu, Bavaria, Germany. At an elevation of 703,30 m, its surface area is 135.30 ha. The lake is known for having a shape that is strikingly similar to that of a whale.
