= List of College of Wooster people =

This page lists notable alumni and former students, faculty, and administrators of the College of Wooster.

== Alumni ==
=== Academia ===
- Karl Taylor Compton, Philosophy (1908), president of MIT 1930–1948; member of the National Academy of Sciences
- Wayne A. Cornelius, Political Science (1967), founder of the Center for Comparative Immigration Studies at the University of California, San Diego
- Fred Eastman, B.A. (1908), theologist, professor, playwright, author, and journalist; chair of dept. of religious drama and literature at Chicago Theological Seminary (1926–1952)
- Frederick Hinitt, Doctor of Divinity (1902), Presbyterian pastor; president of Centre College and Washington & Jefferson College
- Isaac C. Ketler, Presbyterian scholar, founder of Grove City College
- Kimberly Bracken Long, B. Mus. (1981), Presbyterian pastor; writer; associate professor of Worship at Columbia Theological Seminary
- Shannon Boyd-Bailey McCune (1935), geographer and university administrator; president of the University of Florida and the University of Vermont
- Merton M. Sealts, Jr., English (1937), Emerson and Melville scholar
- Ronald Takaki, History (1961), historian, ethnographer, professor of ethnic studies at the University of California, Berkeley
- J. Campbell White, president of Wooster, 1915–1919
- Wendell L. Wylie, orthodontist
- Courtney Young, English (1996), librarian and past president of the American Library Association, 2014–2015
- Nancy Zahniser, pharmacologist

=== Business ===
- Victor J. Andrew, Physics (1926), founder of Andrew Corporation.
- George Fitch, Economics (1970), politician and business consultant; co-founder of the Jamaican bobsled team, which debuted at the 1988 Winter Olympics in Calgary, Alberta
- Stanley Gault, Geology (1948), former CEO of Rubbermaid and Goodyear Tire and Rubber Company
- Charles F. Kettering, inventor of electric automobile starter motor; vice president of General Motors Research Corporation; namesake of Memorial Sloan-Kettering Cancer Center; attended but did not graduate
- Blake Moore, History (1980), NFL lineman for the Cincinnati Bengals and Green Bay Packers; CEO of Allianz Global Investors
- R.J. Thomas, president of the United Auto Workers
- Bill Townsend, Art (1986), Internet entrepreneur, politician, founder and chairman of the Amati Foundation

=== Education ===
- Margaret Lee Chadwick, founder and headmistress of the Chadwick School, and author

=== Government ===
- W. Thomas Andrews (1963), Pennsylvania state senator
- John Carwile, U.S. ambassador to Latvia (2019–present)
- Ted Celeste, member of the Ohio House of Representatives
- John Dean, Political Science (1961), White House counsel (1970–1973) to President Richard Nixon
- Eugene A. DePasquale, Political Science (1993), Pennsylvania auditor general
- David Dudley Dowd Jr. (1951), United States federal judge, United States District Court for the Northern District of Ohio
- Charlie Earl, former Ohio state representative; candidate in the 2014 Ohio gubernatorial election
- Mark F. Giuliano, deputy director of the Federal Bureau of Investigation
- Donald Kohn, Economics (1964), vice chairman of the Board of Governors of the United States Federal Reserve
- Ping-Wen Kuo (1911), Chinese educator and statesman
- William Moore McCulloch, chair of the United States House Committee on the Judiciary, forced Civil Rights Act of 1964 through Congress
- John McSweeney (1912), member of the United States House of Representatives
- John T. Morrison (1887), sixth governor of Idaho, 1903–1905
- Norman Morrison, Religion (1956), pacifist, Vietnam War protester
- Solomon Oliver Jr., Philosophy and Political Science (1969), U.S. District Court chief judge for the Northern District of Ohio
- Carl V. Weygandt (1912), chief justice of the Supreme Court of Ohio

=== Journalism ===
- Vince Cellini, Speech (1981), host of The Golf Channel; former anchor for CNN Sports
- Robert X. Cringely, real name Mark Stephens, History (1975), technology journalist for Public Broadcasting Service
- Alfred William Edel, History (1957), news anchor for ABC Radio News and Voice of America
- Daniel Howes, History (1983), business columnist for The Detroit News
- Mary Sifton Pepper (1883), journalist and translator on The Jesuit Relations

=== Literature ===
- Debra Allbery, English (1979), poet (Walking Distance), winner of the 1990 Agnes Lynch Starrett Poetry Prize
- Frederic Lauriston Bullard (1891), Pulitzer Prize-winning journalist for the Boston Herald; Lincoln historian; writer (Famous War Correspondents)
- Mary Crow, English (1955), Poet Laureate of Colorado
- Stephen R. Donaldson, English (1968), New York Times bestselling science fiction author (Thomas Covenant)
- John Lawrence Goheen (1906), missionary, agriculturist, writer (Glimpses of Ichalkaranji)
- David Means, English (1984), short story writer (Assorted Fire Events), winner of 2000 Los Angeles Times Book Prize for Fiction

=== Performing arts ===
- James B. Allardice, Emmy Award-winning television writer
- Caitlin Cary, English (1990), alt-country musician, member of the band Whiskeytown
- J.C. Chandor, Cultural Film Studies (1996), film director
- Darius Scott Dixson (DIXSON), Academy Award-nominated songwriter and music producer, "Be Alive", contestant on The Voice
- Divya Gopikumar, Psychology (2008), South Indian actress
- Duncan Jones (aka Zowie Bowie or Joey Bowie), Philosophy (1995), British film director of Moon and Source Code; son of rock musician David Bowie
- Debi Smith, Psychology (1976), folk singer/songwriter and member of the Four Bitchin' Babes

=== Religion ===
- Elizabeth Eaton, Music Education (1977), Presiding Bishop of the Evangelical Lutheran Church in America (ELCA) 2013–present
- Sophia Lyon Fahs (1897), honorary degree (1961), writer, liberal religious activist, and educator

=== Science ===
- Martha Chase (1950), geneticist; performed the Hershey–Chase experiment in 1952, proving that genetic information is transmitted by DNA and not protein.
- Arthur Holly Compton, Physics (1913), Nobel Prize-winning physicist; member of the National Academy of Sciences; Chancellor of Washington University 1945–1953
- Helen Murray Free, Chemistry (1945), elected president of the American Chemical Society in 1993; inducted into the National Inventors Hall of Fame in 2000
- Elizebeth Friedman, America's first female cryptologist; attended briefly but transferred elsewhere
- George E. Goodfellow (1876), physician, authority on gunshot wounds, first surgeon to perform a perineal prostatectomy
- Tim McCreight, Art (1973), artist and metalsmith; president of the Society of North American Goldsmiths (1993–1994)
- James V. Neel, Biology (1935), Distinguished Professor of Human Genetics University of Michigan; Albert Lasker Award winner, National Medal of Science winner, National Academy of Sciences member; "father of modern human genetics"
- Stephen J. Page (1993), biomedical researcher, author, clinician, academic, and expert on motor recovery and care after stroke
- James C. Stevens, Chemistry (1975), Distinguished Fellow at Dow Chemical; inventor of constrained geometry catalyst for polyolefin manufacture; member of the National Academy of Engineering
- George W. Thorn, Biology (1927), chief of Medicine, Bringham & Woman's Hospital Harvard University; NAS Public Welfare Medal winner; chairman emeritus, Howard Hughes Medical Institute
- John Travis, Chemistry (1965), preventive medicine physician, founder of first wellness center in US
- Emily A. Buchholtz, Paleontology, vertebrate paleontologist

=== Sports ===
- Charles Follis (1902*), first black professional football player; played for a team in the Ohio League (which later became the NFL)
- Reggie Minton, Physical Education (1963), deputy executive director of the National Association of Basketball Coaches; head basketball coach United States Air Force Academy (1985–2000)
- Lamont Paris, (1996), basketball coach; head coach of University of South Carolina and the University of Tennessee-Chattanooga
- Kyle Rooker, (2000), linebacker for Wooster 1997–2000, currently the head coach for the North Park Vikings football team since 2019.
- Larry Shyatt, Physical Education (1973), basketball coach; head coach of Clemson University and the University of Wyoming; assistant coach of the Dallas Mavericks (2016–2019)

== Faculty and administrators ==
- Daniel Bourne, poet, professor of English
- Joanne Frye, writer, professor of English and Women's Studies
- Jack Gallagher, composer, Olive Williams Kettering Professor of Music
- William Gass, novelist (The Tunnel), professor of philosophy and English
- R. Stanton Hales, president of Wooster (1995–2007), national US badminton champion
- Dario Hunter, rabbi
- Jack Lengyel, head football coach and lacrosse coach 1966–1970; head football coach at Marshall University 1971–1974
- Hayden Schilling, professor of history
- Orange Nash Stoddard, professor of natural history
- Anthony Tognazzini, writer, professor of Creative Writing
- Charles F. Wishart, president of Wooster (1921–1944)
- Susanne Woods, president-elect of Wooster (1995)
- Josephine Wright, musicologist, Josephine Lincoln Morris Professor of Black Studies
