= Edel =

Edel is both a surname and a given name. Notable people with the name include:

== Surname ==
- Abraham Edel (1908–2007), North American philosopher and ethicist
- Alfred William Edel (c. 1930–2005), American television news presenter
- Apoula Edel (born 1986), Cameroonian-Armenian footballer
- Leon Edel (1907–1997), North American literary critic and biographer
- Uli Edel (born 1947), German film director

== Given name ==
Male

- Edel (footballer), Ildefonso Soares de Oliveira (born 1958), Brazilian footballer
- Edel Oliva (born 1965), Cuban race walker
- Edel Rodriguez (born 1971), Cuban-American artist and illustrator

Female, Irish

Pronounced /iːˈdɛl/

- Edel Quinn (1907–1944), Irish lay missionary
- Edel Bhreathnach, Irish historian and academic
- Edel McMahon (born 1994), Irish rugby player

Female, Scandinavian

- Edel Eckblad (1914–1994), Norwegian actress
- Edel Hætta Eriksen (1921–2023), Norwegian schoolteacher and politician
- Edele Jernskjæg (died 1512), Danish noble, lady-in-waiting and royal mistress of King John I of Denmark
- Edel Randem (1910–2001), Norwegian figure skater
- Edel Therese Høiseth (born 1966), former speed skater from Norway, who specialised in the shorter distances; the 500 m and 1,000 m

== Other uses ==
- Eðel or ēðel, a name for Œ / œ, a ligature of the Latin script
- Construction Nautic Edel, a French boat builder
- Edel 665, a French sailboat design
- Edel (character), fictional character in the webtoon series Denma
- Edel SE & Co. KGaA, a German independent media company
- Édel de Cléron, a French cheese from Cléron, Franche-Comté
- Edel Land District, a land district (cadastral division) of Western Australia, located within the North-West Land Division
- Edel-Mega Records, a Danish record company established in 1983. It was renamed Edel-Mega Records when it was acquired by Edel Music in 2001
- EDEL, the ICAO code for Langenlonsheim Airfield
- Edel Paragliders, a defunct South Korean paraglider manufacturing company
- Edel, another name for the logic puzzle nonogram

== See also ==
- Edelmann, a surname of German origin
- Edelstein, a surname of German Origin
