= UP International =

German aircraft manufacturer

UP International GmbH
- Company type: Gesellschaft mit beschränkter Haftung
- Industry: Aerospace
- Founded: 1970
- Founder: Pete Brock
- Headquarters: Garmisch-Partenkirchen, Germany
- Products: Paragliders
- Owner: Christian Rönning
- Website: www.up-paragliders.com

UP International GmbH is a German aircraft manufacturer based in Garmisch-Partenkirchen. The company specializes in the design and manufacture of paragliders in the form of ready-to-fly aircraft. The company started business as a hang glider manufacturer based in the United States.

The company is presently organized as a Gesellschaft mit beschränkter Haftung, a German limited liability company. It is officially Ultralite Products – UP International GmbH.

The company was initially formed as Ultralight Products, later Ultralite Products and was also known as UP Europe and finally UP International.

== History ==
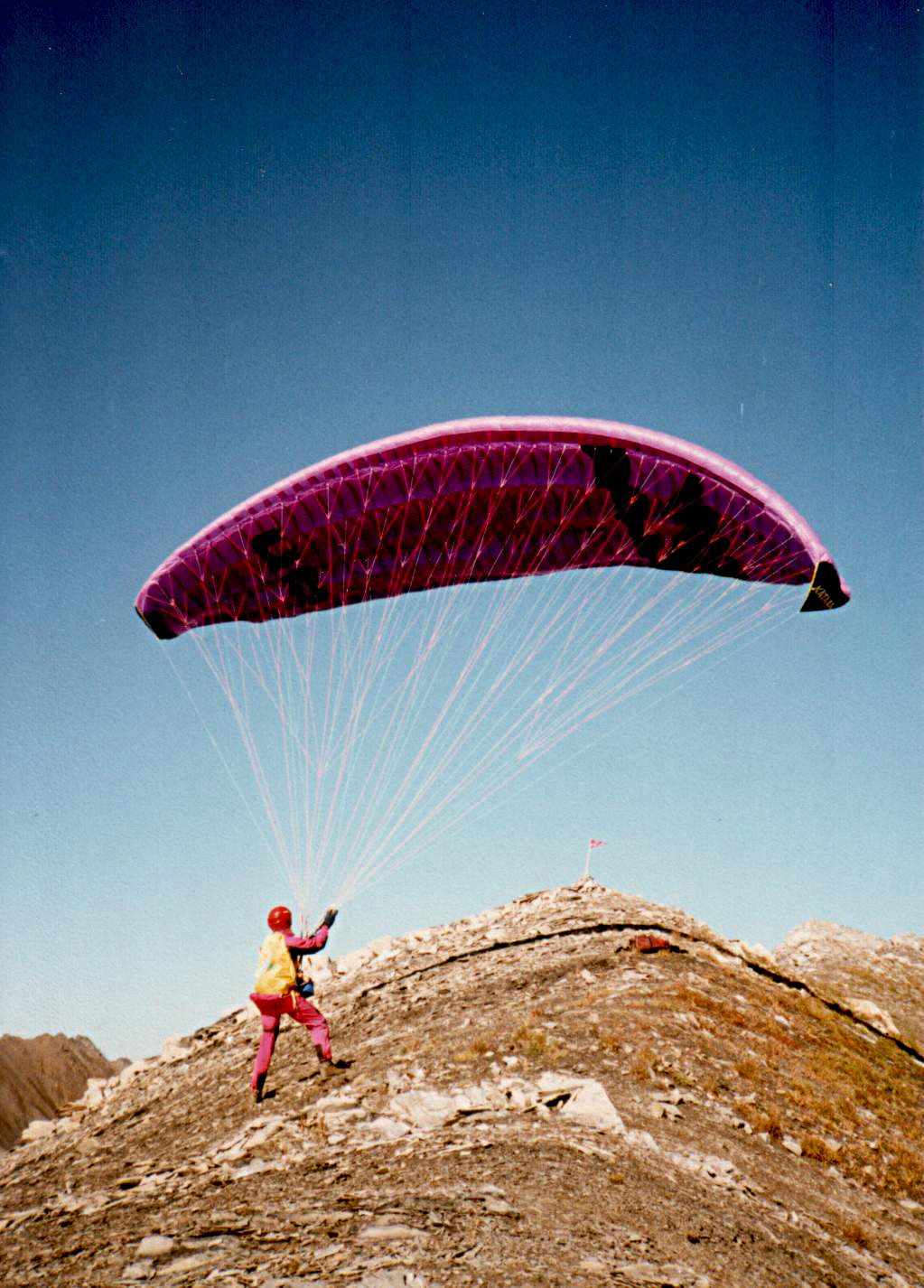
UP Katana paraglider

The company was founded in Pasadena, California, United States by American Pete Brock following his graduation from an industrial design program. His initial work was in racing car design, including the Shelby Daytona. His interests turned to hang gliding and his first design was the Brock Redtail.

With Roy Haggard, Brock designed the UP Dragonfly, the first hang glider that did not use a Rogallo style wing. The UP Condor set a world record duration flight of 16 hours and 4 minutes in 1979. In 1980, Yuseke Yamazaki, a Japanese investor supported the company and it expanded into Asia.

Haggard designed the UP Comet in 1980, a landmark hang glider design that set many records, sold in large numbers and was widely copied.

By the mid-1980s Brock and Haggard decided to leave the business and Japanese investor Yamazaki took over the company, changing the name to UP International. It became a wholly owned subsidiary of Isomura, Inc. The company expanded into windsurfing equipment, ultralight aircraft and clothing. The company maintained a diverse series of locations, including the UP Soaring Center in Salt Lake City Utah, where the UP TRX hang glider was developed.

In 1990 the company expanded into paraglider building and hired South Korean designer Gin Seok Song to design the company's first paraglider, the UP Flash. The design sold well, but Song did not design another glider for UP and instead went to work for Edel Paragliders. He later founded his own company, Gin Gliders.

In 1992 Ernst Schneider established UP Europe in Sindelsdorf, Germany and company paraglider development shifted to that country. Rasso von Schlichtegroll developed the new line of gliders, including the UP Katana, UP Vision and the tandem two-place UP Pickup. Von Schlichtegroll later went on to found FreeX. Company Chief Test Pilot, Ernst Strobl, won the 1992 European Paragliding Championships on a Katana. UP employee Uli Wiesmeier won the first Paragliding World Cup series also flying a Katana. Wiesmeier also designed UP's Skywear clothing line. French UP pilot Richard Gallon won the 1994 Paragliding World Cup and, in 1995, World Champion Stephan Stiegler and other top paragliding pilots all became members of the UP flying team.

With this success, Schneider established an UP Europe hang glider design operation under Bernd Weber's management. This resulted in the UP Speed hang glider design in 1995 and the Speed TL model in 1997.

Schneider sold UP Europe in 1997 to Daiichi Kosho of Japan, who invested in the company, expanding it in Europe to 20 employees and it relocated to Kochel am See. This period the company produced the UP Escape paraglider, which sold well, although the paraglider market was in contraction then.

Daiichi Kosho sold the company in 1999. The hang gliding business was wound up and the paragliding division sold to Christian Rönning, a pioneering Swedish paraglider pilot. Rönning reorganized the company as UP International and consolidated operations, with Torsten Siegel, Georg Maier and former World Champion Stephan Stiegler taking on glider development. This team developed the UP Pulse, UP Makalu, UP Summit, UP Gambit and the UP Sherpa Bi as well as the UP Targa and UP Trango. Siegel went on to work for Swing Flugsportgeräte, and Stieglair left to start his own company, Air Design.

Since 2010 the design team has been made up of Czechs Frantisek "Franta" Pavlousek, Michal "Snajby" Sneiberg and Jirik "Jirka" Dlask, German aerospace engineer Matthias Hartmann and Stefan "Boxi" Bocks.

== Aircraft ==
Summary of aircraft built by UP International GmbH and predecessor companies:

- UP Ascent
- UP Blues
- UP Boogie
- UP Cab
- UP Comet
- UP Condor
- UP Dragonfly
- UP Edge
- UP Escape
- UP Flash
- UP Gambit
- UP Gamit
- UP Groove
- UP Jazz
- UP K2
- UP Kantana
- UP Kantega
- UP Katana
- UP Kendo
- UP Kuna
- UP Makalu
- UP Pickup
- UP Pico
- UP Pulse
- UP Rock
- UP Sherpa
- UP Soul
- UP Speed
- UP Stellar
- UP Summit
- UP Targa
- UP Trango
- UP TRX
- UP Vision
- UP Xpress
