= Steven Page (disambiguation) =

Steven Page (born 1970) is a Canadian musician

Steven Page or Stephen Page may refer to:

- Stephen J. Page, American biomedical researcher
- Stephen Page (born 1965), Australian choreographer
- Steven Page, American subject of a murder-suicide

== See also ==
- Stephen Paget (1855–1926), English surgeon
