= Campbell White =

J. Campbell White may refer to:

- Campbell P. White (1787–1859), U.S. Representative from New York
- J. Campbell White (1870–1962), American YMCA leader and president of the College of Wooster
