= Elliott and Stoddard Halls =

Dormitory buildings in Oxford, OH

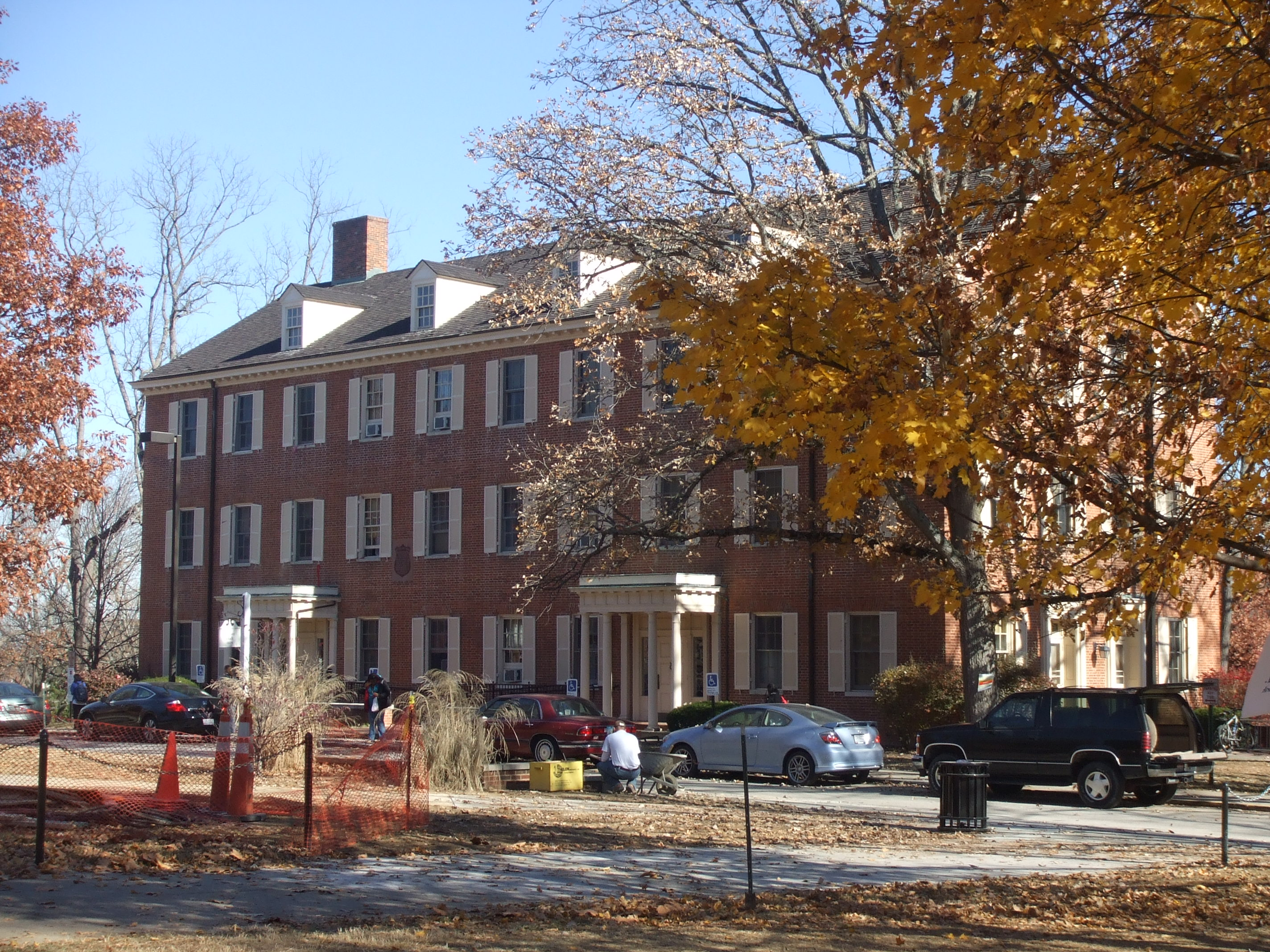
- Elliott Hall
- Interactive map of the Elliott and Stoddard Halls area
- Former names: North and South Dorms

General information
- Type: Dormitory building
- Architectural style: Federal
- Location: Elliott: 101 Irvin Drive Oxford, OH 45056; Stoddard: 201 Irvin Drive Oxford, OH 45056
- Coordinates: 39°30′31.29″N 84°44′6.93″W
- Inaugurated: Elliott: 1825; Stoddard: 1836
- Cost: Elliott: $7,000; Stoddard: $9,000

Technical details
- Floor area: Elliott: 12,611; Stoddard: 12,711
- Elliott and Stoddard Halls
- U.S. National Register of Historic Places
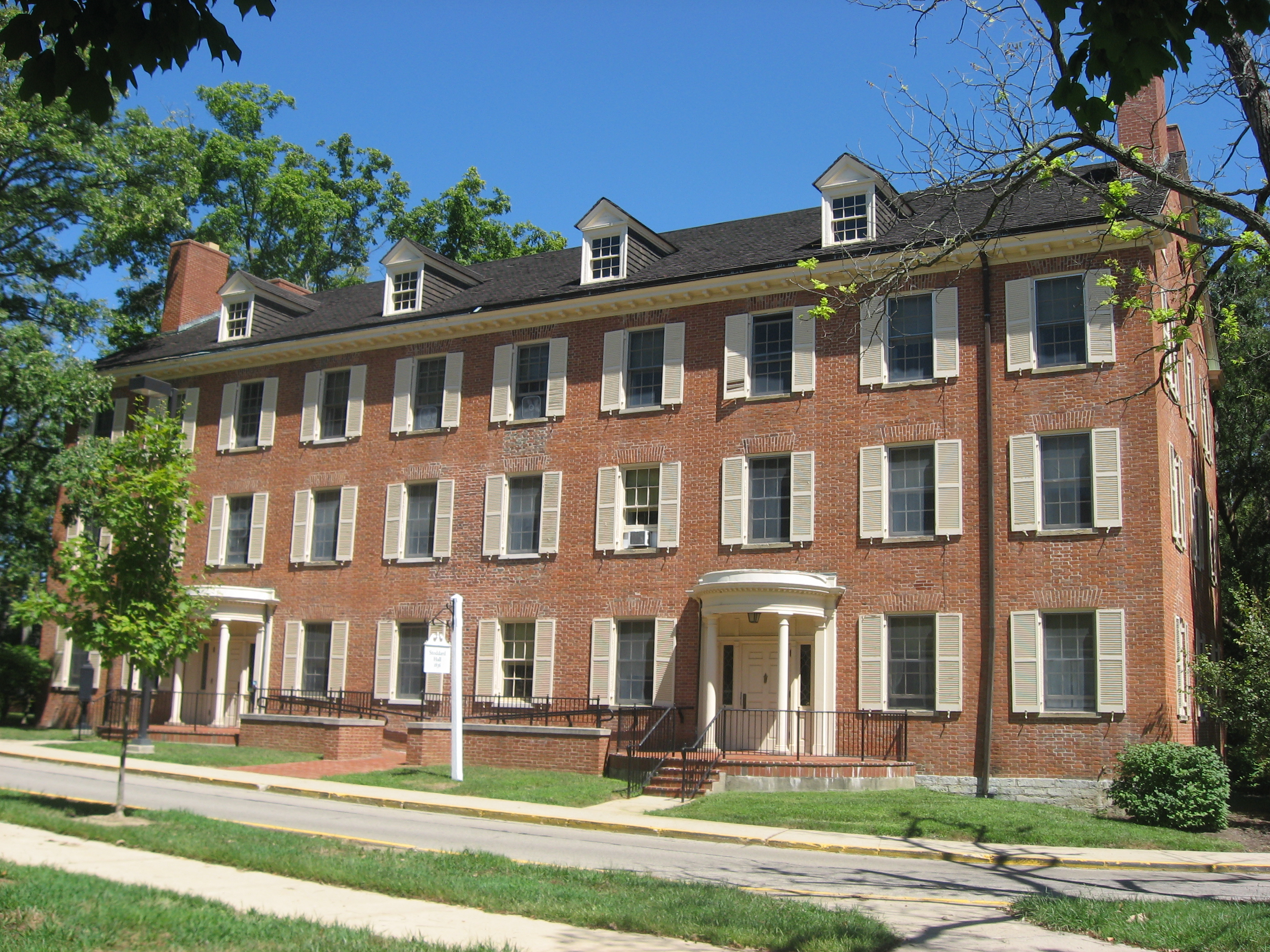
- Stoddard Hall
- NRHP reference No.: 73001391
- Added to NRHP: 1973-04-03

Elliott and Stoddard Halls are the two oldest remaining buildings on Miami University's Oxford Ohio campus today. Built in 1825 (Elliott) and 1836 (Stoddard), they were designed in the Federal style and modeled after Connecticut Hall at Yale University. They continue to be used as dormitory buildings, making them the two oldest college dormitories still in use in Ohio. They were the original dormitories on the campus and were built to house students who attended classes at Miami's campus. They have both been through a number of renovations, most recently in 2011. The dorms are located in between the two academic quads located in the center of Miami's campus. They face another landmark on the campus, the Miami University seal. Over time they have become landmarks on the campus and are considered two of the most prestigious dorms to live in, they are also listed on the National Register of Historic Places. Today, they house students in the Scholar Leaders program. The buildings are named for early Miami professors Charles Elliott and Orange Nash Stoddard.

Phi Delta Theta fraternity was founded in Elliott Hall in 1848. Phi Kappa Tau founders William H. Shideler and Clinton D. Boyd lived together in the same room in Elliott at the time of their fraternity's founding in 1906. Both buildings were rebuilt in 1937 with the assistance of the Public Works Administration.

In 2011, Elliott and Stoddard Halls became the first dorms at Miami to convert to geothermal energy instead of using the coal and natural gas steam system. The new system reduced the two buildings' energy consumption by 61 percent.

== Elliott Hall ==
Room in Elliott Hall where Phi Delta Theta was founded in 1848

Originally known as North Dorm or "Old North," construction on Elliott Hall was completed in 1825. The dorm was originally used for student housing and its purpose has remained the same since its opening. The building was originally constructed for a total cost of $7,000. The dorm housed 35 men. Each resident was given survival tools upon their arrival to ensure their comfort and safety in the dorm. These tools included a bed, chairs, table, cook utensils, an ax to cut wood for the fireplaces in each room, and a warm cap.

The first renovations on the building were started in 1899. The first one was the addition of multiple new technologies for the time, which were supposed to make the dorm a more modern building. These renovations included the addition of a steam heater, electrical lights and modern bathrooms. These first set of renovations were mainly mechanical ones in order to keep up with the changing times. The next renovation on the building took place in 1912. With this renovation the central hall of the building was removed and later replaced by two-side halls, which virtually cut the hall into two sections. Both the corridors were named for professors at the school, R.B.C. Johnson and Charles Elliott. The next renovations came to the building in 1937, with these the building took on all the same features and characteristics that it has today. To get ready to bring the building into the New Miami look many things were done. The interior of the building was completely redone. This caused the special layout of the space to become a much more unified building. On the exterior of the building all the bricks were sandblasted in order to make it fit in with the other buildings on Miami's campus. Also a number of the original chimneys were removed.

In 1848, the fraternity Phi Delta Theta was founded in room 202 of Elliott Hall. The two co-founders of the fraternity, Robert Morrison and John M. Wilson, were both roommates in this room when they decided to try and cultivate the fraternity. Today this room acts as a shrine to these two men. The room consists of two beds, a table, portraits of the men, and a stone plaque to help commemorate the founding of Phi Delta Theta. This room has seen little change since the founding of the fraternity.

After the final set of renovations had been completed on the dorm it officially had its name changed from North Dorm to Elliott Hall in recognition of Charles Elliott who one of the corridors had been named after. Elliott was a professor at Miami University between 1849 and 1863. He was a professor of Logic and Greek Language and Literature. He received his education from a number of schools including Lafayette College, Ohio University, Hanover College, and Princeton Theological Seminary. He died in 1892 at the age of 77.

== Stoddard Hall ==
Originally known as Southeast Building, construction was completed in 1836. This was the third building completed on Miami's campus and was used as housing for junior and senior male students. The building was completed for a total cost of $9,000 and housed up to 29 students. In 1868, the Miami chapter of Delta Upsilon fraternity was founded in room 4, the room of one of the original members, William Eltzroth. Today, a plaque inside Stoddard describes to the founding of the chapter and is dedicated to the 12 members of the fraternity who died during World War II. Delta Upsilon was the sixth and final fraternity from the "Old Miami" era. For a short period of time the campus YMCA was housed in Stoddard Hall in 1869 and also housed classrooms while the main academic building, Old Main, was under renovations.

In 1937 a large renovation project was started on "Old South" to try adapt the building to the New Miami era. The project's main objective was to make "Old North" and "Old South" together and to make them fit with the rest of the architecture that was progressing on Miami's campus. The entire interior space of the building was gutted, and the old fireplaces and stove openings had to be removed. The circulation patterns of the building were also rerouted to make traveling throughout the building more user-friendly and simple.

After the renovation had been completed, Miami decided to rename the building Stoddard Hall in honor of Professor Orange Nash Stoddard, who was a professor at Miami University between 1845 and 1870. During this time period he taught natural Science and acted as President in 1854. He received his education from Union College and Monmouth. Stoddard died on February 10, 1892.
