= Orange Nash Stoddard =

American natural scientist (1812–1892)

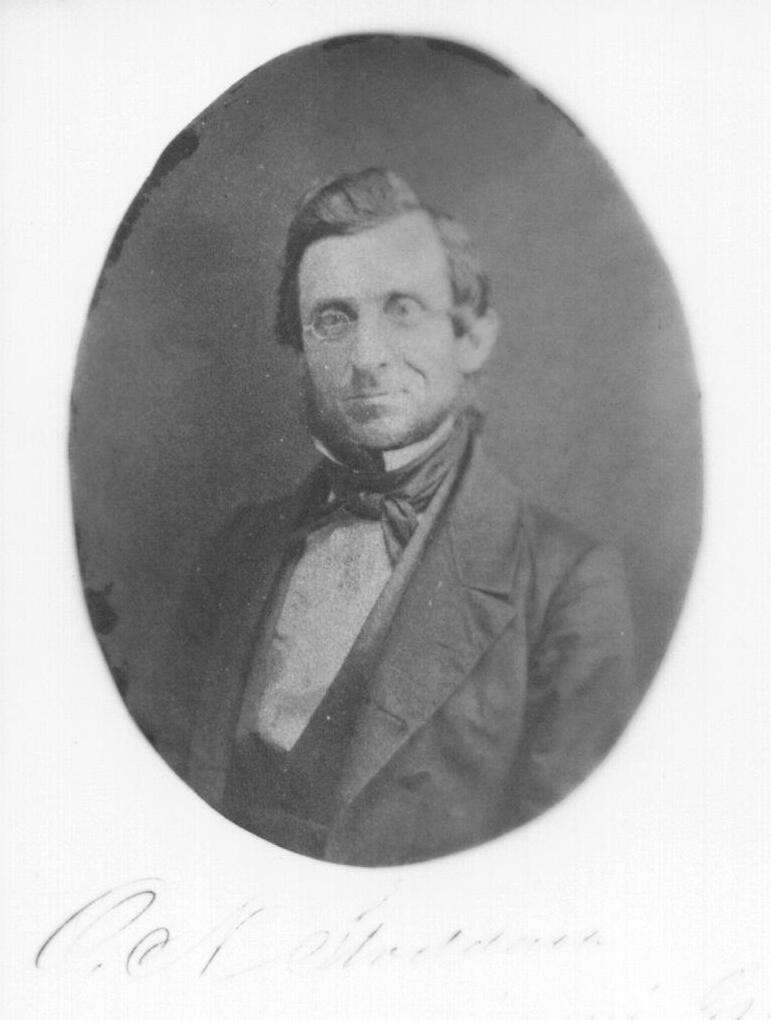
Orange Nash Stoddard

Orange Nash Stoddard (August 23, 1812—February 10, 1892) was a professor of natural science at Miami University and the College of Wooster. He served as president pro tem of Miami University in 1854.

Stoddard was born in Lisle, New York, and received his A.B. degree from Union College 1834. He received an honorary LL.D. degree at Monmouth College.

He joined the Miami faculty in 1845. Among his more prominent students were Benjamin Harrison, David Swing, John Willock Noble and Whitelaw Reid. At Miami, he became a faculty member of Phi Delta Theta, and was known affectionately as "Stoddy" and "the Little Wizard" by his students.

Stoddard and his wife, Eliza, lived in a historic home at 16 South Campus Avenue in Oxford, where they raised their three daughters who graduated from the Oxford Female College.

He resigned in 1870 to assume a professorship at the College of Wooster, where he died in 1892 while serving as professor emeritus.

Stoddard Hall on the Miami campus was named for him in 1937.

Preceded by William C. Anderson	President of Miami University; 1845	Succeeded by John W. Hall
