= Fichtsee =

Lake in Bavaria, Germany

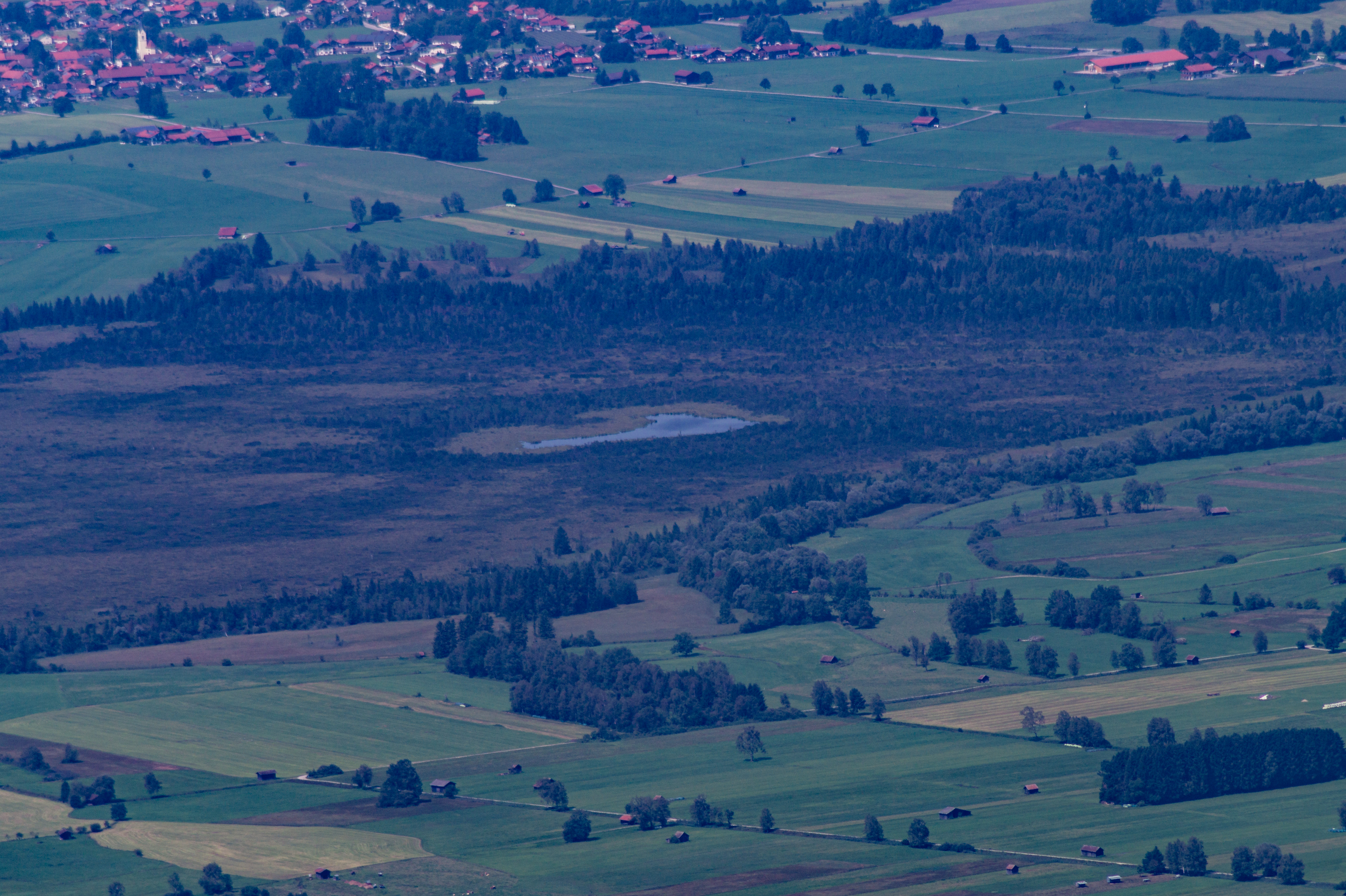
- View of the lake and the surrounding area from the Benediktenwand

- Location within Bavaria
- Location: Sindelbach, Sindelsdorf, Landkreis Weilheim-Schongau, Bavaria
- Coordinates: 47°42′41″N 11°21′41″E
- Basin countries: Germany
- Surface area: 0.015 km^{2} (0.0058 sq mi)
- Surface elevation: 595 m (1,952 ft)

Fichtsee is a lake in Sindelbach, Sindelsdorf, Landkreis Weilheim-Schongau, Bavaria, Germany. At an elevation of 595 m (1,952 ft), its surface area is 0.015 km^{2} (0.0058 sq mi).
