= Mary Sifton Pepper =

American journalist and translator

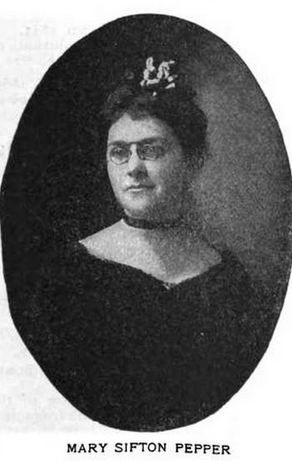
- Born: c. 1862
- Died: 1908
- Occupations: Journalist, translator
- Notable work: Maids and Matrons of New France

Mary Sifton Pepper (born about 1862; died 1908) was an American journalist and translator, author of Maids and Matrons of New France (1901), an early work in Canadian women's history.

== Early life ==
Pepper was the daughter of George Whitfield Pepper and Christine Lindsay Pepper. Her parents were both born in Ireland; her father, who served as a chaplain in the American Civil War, was a clergyman, writer, and diplomat. She lived in Milan from 1891 to 1895, and traveled in Europe while her father was based there.

Mary Sifton Pepper graduated from the College of Wooster in Ohio, in 1883. Her brother Charles M. Pepper and her sisters Caroline Lipton Pepper and Lena Lindsay Pepper were also writers.

== Career ==
In the 1890s, Pepper was a translator of French and Italian on the 73-volume edition of The Jesuit Relations, documents related to the work of European Jesuit missionaries in North America. From her experience on that project, she wrote Maids and Matrons of New France (1901), an early work in Canadian women's history. Her book was praised as "a volume which is not only peculiarly absorbing but which in the main covers unbroken ground."

As a journalist, she wrote a profile of Queen Margherita of Italy for Godey's Magazine in 1896. She also wrote a biographical article on Italian poet Giosuè Carducci.

== Personal life ==
Pepper lived in Cleveland, Ohio. She died in 1908.
