= Hayden Schilling =

American historian

W. A. Hayden Schilling
- Education: Southern Methodist University, Vanderbilt University
- Occupation: Historian
- Writing career
- Subject: Tudor-Stuart England
- Notable awards: 2005 Outstanding Baccalaureate Colleges Professor of the Year

W. A. Hayden Schilling (born June 2, 1935) was the Robert Critchfield Professor of English History at the College of Wooster, Wooster, Ohio, where he taught from 1964 until his retirement in 2015.

== Academic career ==
Schilling attended Southern Methodist University, where he received his Bachelor of Arts in History in 1959. He then attended Vanderbilt University, earning his Master of Arts in 1962 and his PhD in 1970. His dissertation was The Central Government and the Municipal Corporations in England, 1642-1663. Schilling began teaching history at Wooster in 1964, achieved tenure in 1971, and the rank of professor of history in 1976. He served as Chair of the History Department from 1974 to 1976, and again from 2001 to 2004. He was dean of admissions from 1982 to 1989 and from 1990 to 1994.

== Coaching career ==
Schilling served as head coach of men's tennis at Wooster from 1980 to 2013. During his tenure, the team had more than 450 wins and four North Coast Athletic Conference championships. Schilling is a five-time North Coast Athletic Conference Men's Tennis Coach of the Year (1985, 1990, 1991, 1996, 2004).

== Activism ==
Schilling participated in Freedom Summer in 1966 when he taught at Miles College in Fairfield, Alabama. He also served as chair of the Committee on Black Education at the College of Wooster which introduced a Black Studies curriculum to the school. In 1973, Schilling was a member of the Wayne County Interfaith Commission on Human Rights.

== Awards and honors ==
Schilling was a Fulbright Scholar at Royal Holloway College, The University of London, in 1962–1963. In 2005, he won the U.S. Professor of the Year Award for Outstanding Baccalaureate Colleges Professor from the Council for Advancement and Support of Education and the Carnegie Foundation for the Advancement of Teaching.
