= Edel 665 =

Sailboat class

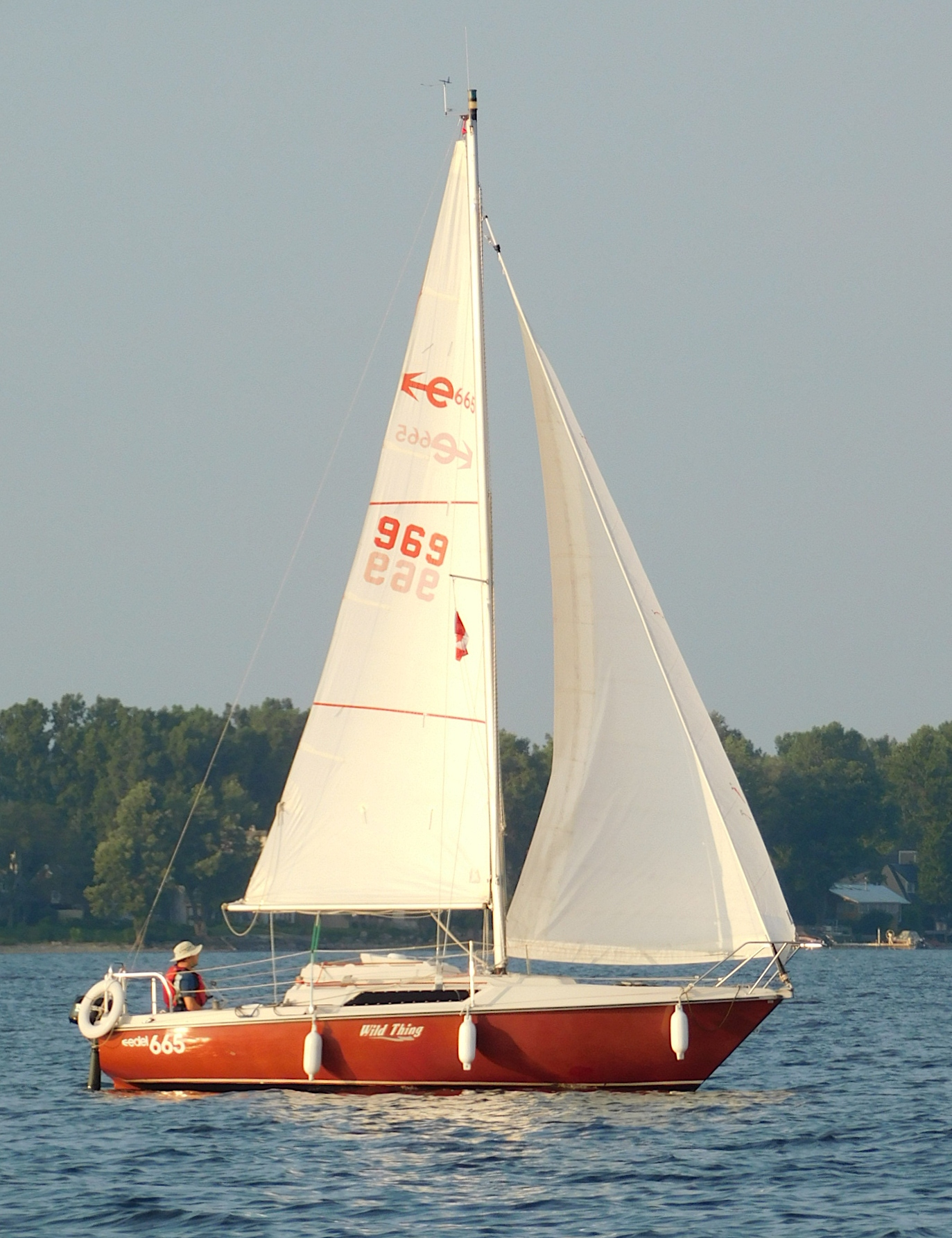

Development
- Designer: Maurice Edel
- Location: France
- Year: 1975
- No. built: 900
- Builders: Construction Nautic Edel; Edel Canada
- Name: Edel 665

Boat
- Displacement: 2,403 lb (1,090 kg)
- Draft: 3.25 ft (0.99 m)

Hull
- Type: Monohull
- Construction: Fiberglass
- LOA: 21.83 ft (6.65 m)
- LWL: 18.21 ft (5.55 m)
- Beam: 8.21 ft (2.50 m)
- Engine: Outboard motor

Hull appendages
- Keel: fin keel
- Ballast: 882 lb (400 kg)
- Rudder: skeg-mounted spade-type rudder

Rig
- Rig type: Bermuda rig
- I foretriangle height: 23.70 ft (7.22 m)
- J foretriangle base: 9.00 ft (2.74 m)
- P mainsail luff: 23.80 ft (7.25 m)
- E mainsail foot: 8.80 ft (2.68 m)

Sails
- Sailplan: Fractional rigged sloop
- Mainsail area: 104.72 sq ft (9.729 m^{2})
- Jib/genoa area: 106.65 sq ft (9.908 m^{2})
- Total sail area: 211.37 sq ft (19.637 m^{2})

The Edel 665 is a French sailboat, that was designed by Maurice Edel and first built in 1984. It was marketed as the Edel 660 in France and is sometimes referred to as the Edel 6.

== Production ==
The design was built by Construction Nautic Edel in France and also at its Canadian subsidiary, Edel Canada. Between 1975 and 1984 a total of 900 examples were completed.

== Design ==
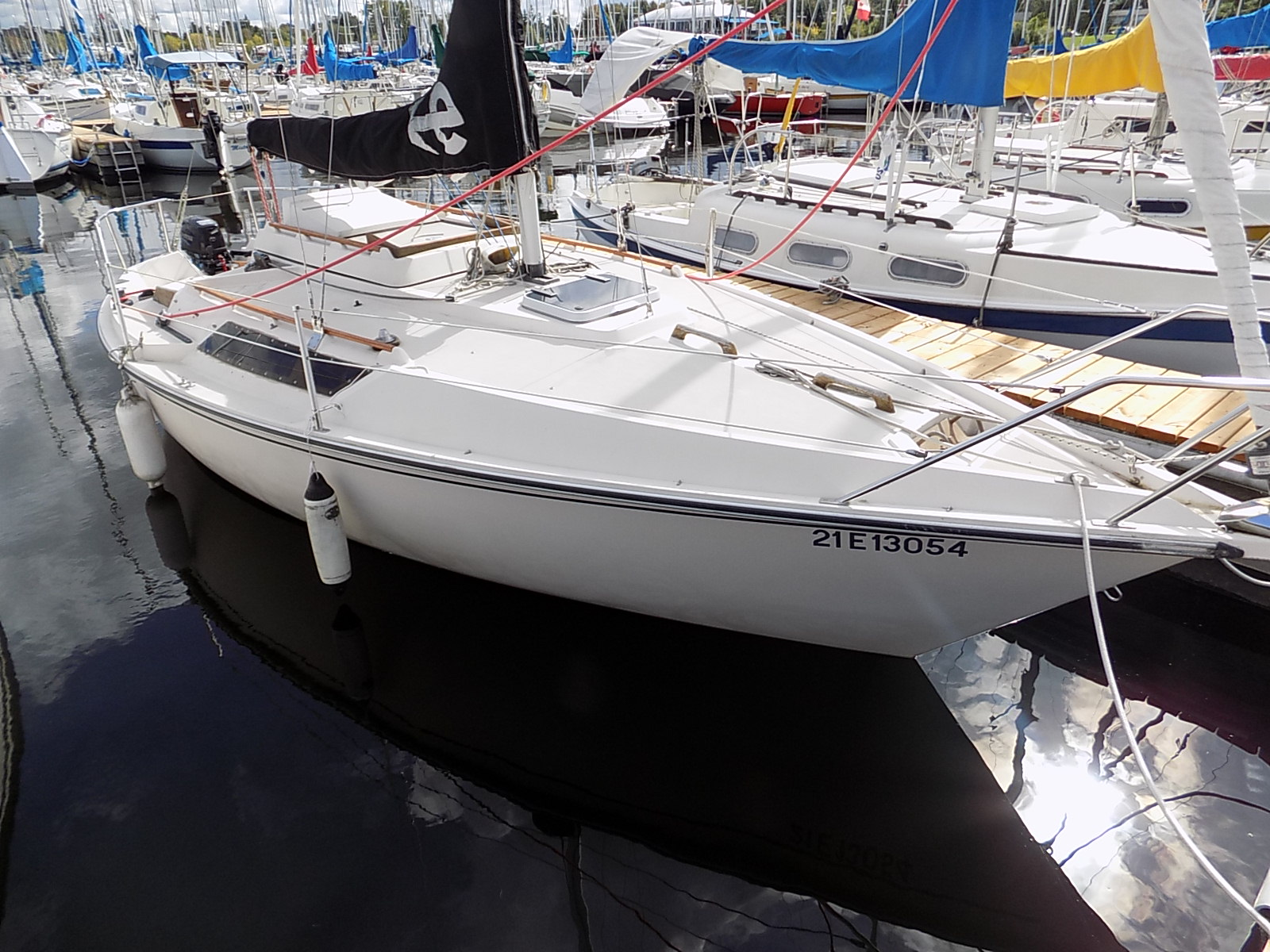
Edel 665

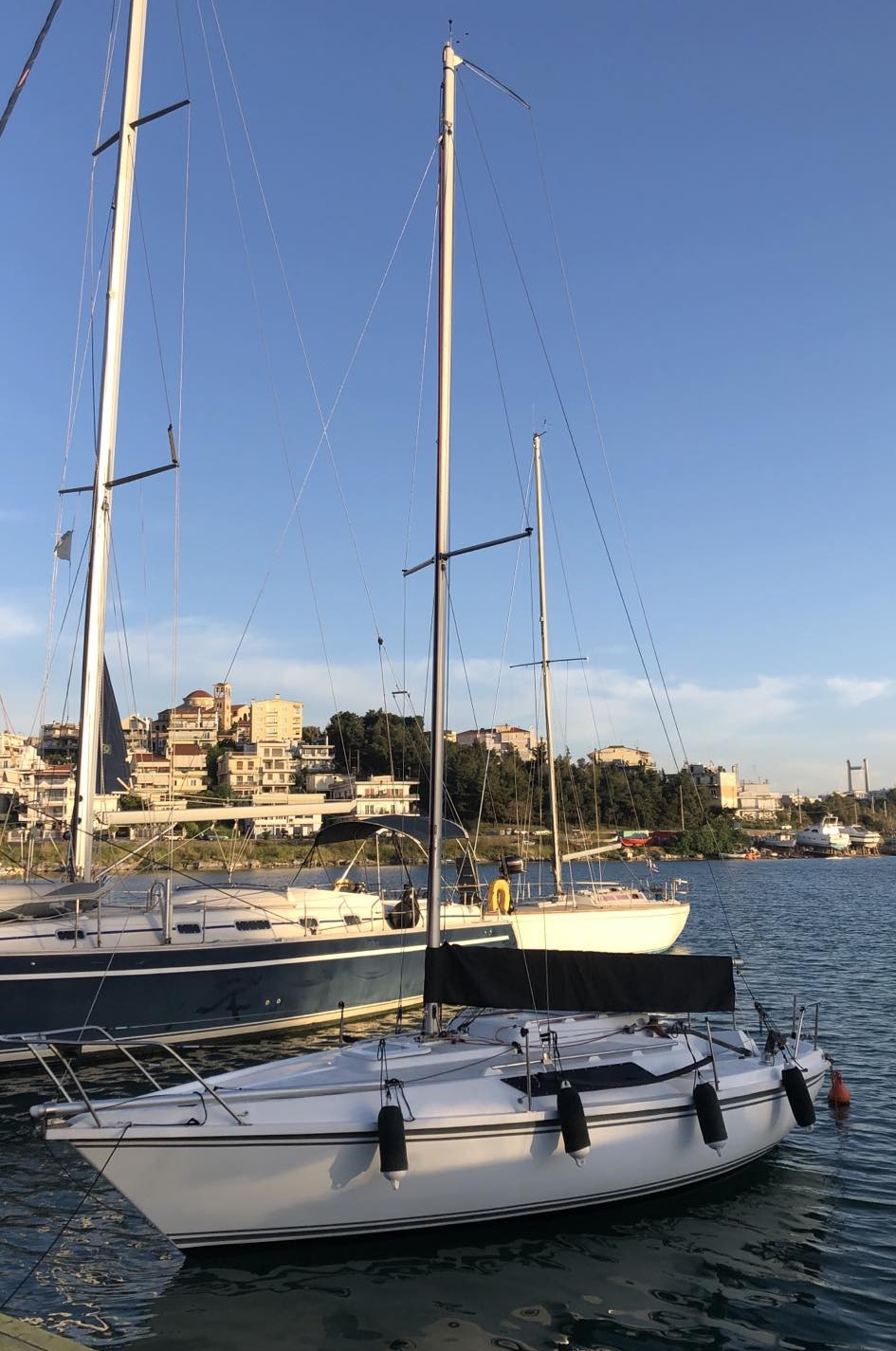
Edel 660 in Greece, prepared for racing

The Edel 665 is a small recreational keelboat, built predominantly of fiberglass, with mahogany wood trim. It has a fractional sloop rig, a raked stem, a vertical transom, a skeg-mounted spade-type rudder controlled by a tiller and a fixed fin keel. It displaces 2,403 lb (1,090 kg) and carries 882 lb (400 kg) of ballast.

The boat has a draft of 3.25 ft (0.99 m) with the standard keel fitted. The boat is normally fitted with a small outboard motor for docking and maneuvering.

Features include a lifting eye on the keel to facilitate winching the boat in and out of the water with a crane, opening foredeck hatch, a mainsheet traveller and genoa tracks. Accommodations can sleep four people on a "V"-berth, a convertible settee and quarter berth. Factory options included jibsheet winches, a hydraulic "pop-top", a recirculating head and a spinnaker.

The design has a hull speed of 5.72 kn (10.59 km/h).

== Operational history ==
The design was named Boat of the Year at the Paris Boat Show.

== See also ==
- List of sailing boat types

Related development

- Edel 540
