= Eðel =

Eðel may refer to:

- The ᛟ rune.
- The Œ used to transliterate that rune
