= Phi Delta Theta =

North American collegiate fraternity

- ΦΔΘ
- Founded: December 26, 1848; 177 years ago Miami University
- Type: Social
- Affiliation: Independent
- Former affiliation: NIC
- Status: Active
- Scope: North America
- Motto: Εἷς ἀνὴρ οὐδεὶς ἀνήρ
- Slogan: One man is no man.
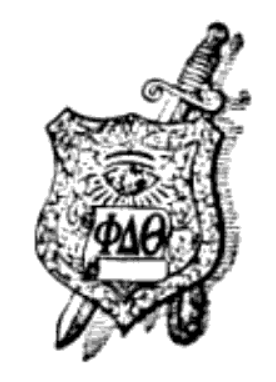
- Member badge
- Colors: Azure and Argent
- Flag
- Flower: White carnation
- Patron Greek deity: Pallas Athena and her Owl
- Publication: The Scroll
- Philanthropy: Live Like Lou (Lou Gehrig's disease)
- Chapters: 219 active, 300 installed
- Members: 312,000 lifetime
- Nicknames: Phi Delts, Phis
- Headquarters: 2 South Campus Avenue; Oxford, Ohio 45056; United States
- Website: Official website

Phi Delta Theta (ΦΔΘ), commonly known as Phi Delt, is an international college social fraternity founded in 1848, and currently headquartered, at Miami University in Oxford, Ohio. Phi Delta Theta, along with Beta Theta Pi and Sigma Chi form the Miami Triad.

The fraternity has over 200 active chapters and colonies in over 44 U.S. states and five Canadian provinces and has initiated more than 310,000 men between 1848 and 2024. There are over 180,000 living alumni. Phi Delta Theta chartered house corporations own over 135 houses valued at over $141 million as of summer 2015. There are nearly 100 recognized alumni clubs across the U.S. and Canada.

Among the best-known members of the fraternity are Benjamin Harrison, the 23rd President of the United States, Vice President Adlai Stevenson I, chief justice of the United States Fred M. Vinson, Baseball Hall of Fame member Lou Gehrig, actor Burt Reynolds, architect Frank Lloyd Wright, astronaut Neil Armstrong, and John S. McCain Sr., U.S. Navy Admiral and grandfather of John McCain, and William A. McCain, brother of John S. McCain Sr.

== History ==
=== Founding ===
The room where Phi Delta Theta was founded in 1839, now used by undergraduates of the parent chapter in recognition of achievement

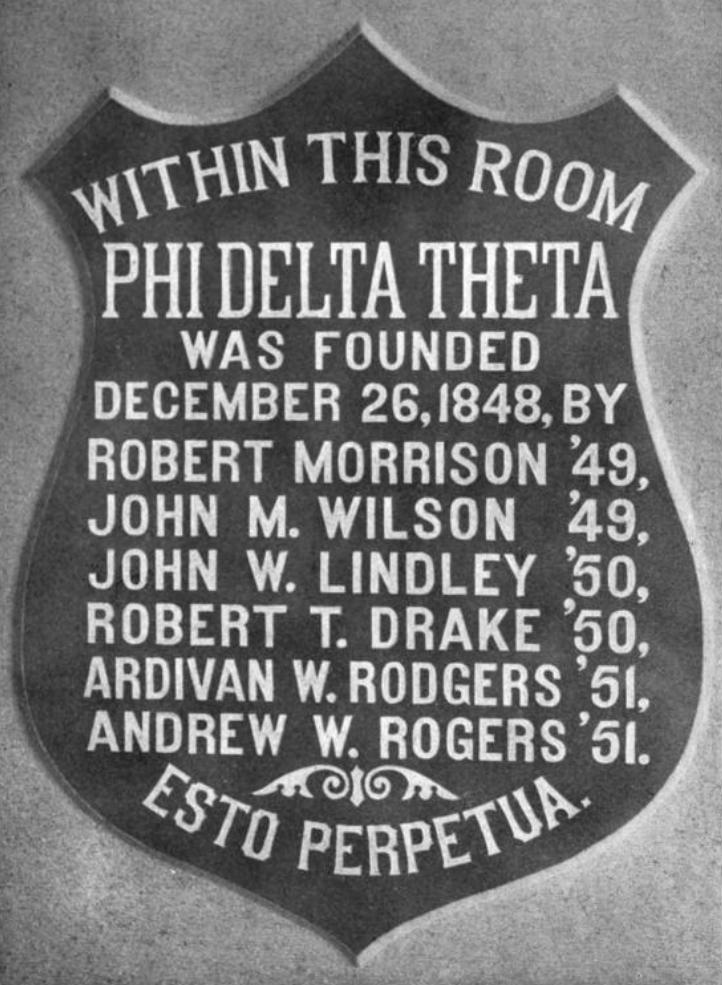
Memorial tablet

In 1839, Beta Theta Pi was founded at Miami University in Oxford, Ohio. In protest against the university's president, members of Beta Theta Pi and another fraternity, Alpha Delta Phi, blocked the entrances of the main educational and administrative building in what became known as the Great Snowball Rebellion of 1848.

After the president expelled most of the students involved in the uprising, Phi Delta Theta was formed by six men staying in a dormitory the day after Christmas. Robert Morrison, a senior, proposed to classmate John McMillan Wilson that they form a secret society together; the two subsequently invited juniors Robert Thompson Drake and John Wolfe Lindley and sophomores Ardivan Walker Rodgers and Andrew Watts Rogers to join them. These men are known today as "The Immortal Six." The first meeting was held in Wilson's room at Old North Hall, now called Elliott Hall.

Phi Delta Theta was created under three principal objectives: "the cultivation of friendship among its members, the acquirement individually of a high degree of mental culture, and the attainment personally of a high standard of morality". These cardinal principles are contained in The Bond of Phi Delta Theta, the document to which each member pledges on his initiation into the fraternity.

=== 19th century ===
During the early meetings, the Founders wrote The Bond of Phi Delta Theta, which is the fundamental law of the fraternity. It has remained unchanged ever since, and it is believed to be the only document of any fraternity of such a nature. Morrison designed the shield form of the badge, with the eye as an emblem, while Wilson suggested the scroll with the Greek letters on it. The first branch of Phi Delta Theta was founded at Miami University in Oxford, Ohio, in 1848. Fearing punishment from the university, the activities of the fraternity were sub rosa for its first three years of existence. Phi Delta Theta also took an unusual step, unique among all fraternities, of splitting into two chapters at both Miami and Centre College, so their meetings would be smaller and attract less attention. Eventually, as the organization attracted new individuals into their membership including prominent university officials, members began to openly wear their badges indicating their affiliation.

Phi Delta Theta held its first convention in 1851 in Cincinnati when the organization had only four chapters. The event was attended by seven members. Despite the limited number, positive steps were taken for the establishment of new chapters by forming an expansion committee. It was also during the first convention that the chapter at Miami University was designated as the Grand Chapter whose duties were to oversee the overall fraternity operations. Subsequent conventions were held again in Cincinnati five years later; Bloomington, Indiana in 1858; and Danville, Kentucky in 1860. Another convention was held in 1864 in Bloomington during the American Civil War. The Civil War was difficult for all fraternities. Battles put fraternity brother against fraternity brother. Fifty Phis fought on the side of the Confederacy while 231 Phis fought for the Union Army.

At its convention in Indianapolis in 1868, the first steps were taken to create an overall administrative plan for the fraternity. The convention was regarded as the first "National Convention" as permanent convention rules were adopted during this time. Twelve years later, the most important of all Phi Delta Theta conventions took place. The Indianapolis Convention of 1880 established new rituals, insignia, and customs that are still used today. Moreover, the convention saw the creation of the General Council, the governing body of the fraternity, with Walter B. Palmer, Emory-Vanderbilt 1877, and George Banta, Franklin-Indiana 1876, becoming the president and historian, respectively. The convention also called for the organization of groups of chapters into provinces, which were to be headed by province presidents.

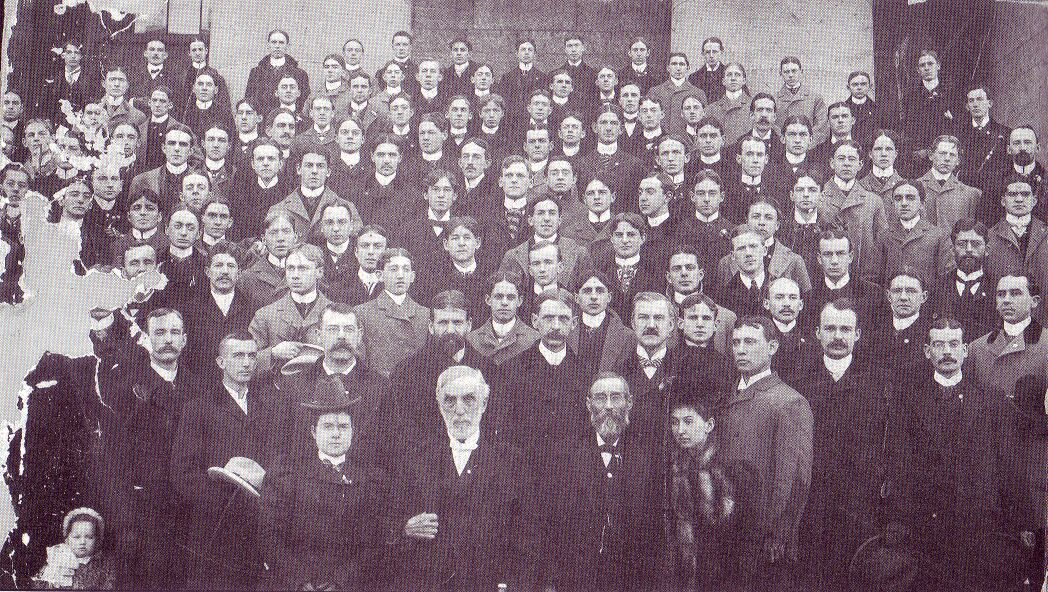
The 50th anniversary of Phi Delta Theta with Founders Morrison and Lindley in the forefront taken at the 1898 convention

A housing movement began to form during this time. The movement arose out of necessity because it was pointed out that chapter meetings were being conducted in rented halls. Even though the housing movement had been gaining momentum, it was not until the 1892 convention that a resolution was passed that advocated that all chapters rent or own at least one house. In the last two decades of the 19th century, over fifty chapter houses were acquired.

For a brief period, a resolution was set forth to allow chapters to initiate women. First proposed in 1869, this was considered a radical idea both from a fraternal standpoint and social one as well since women were not allowed to vote until 1920. Although it was met with strong opposition, the issue would not be settled for several years.

During the two decades from 1870 to 1890, the growth of the fraternity was rapid, due principally to the efforts of Palmer and Banta. The two were given the title "Second Founders" for their work. In the 1870s alone, 34 new chapters were established, but this was also a period of uncertainty because of the anti-fraternity sentiment held by many faculty in schools where Phi Delta Theta had chapters. Several chapters became dormant because of this. Still, the fraternity was aided by the absorption of local fraternities that sought national membership, including a merger that absorbed five chapters of Kappa Sigma Kappa in 1886. The fraternity continued steady growth, and by 1889, there were 66 chapters in 27 states.

The first three pledge manuals of the fraternity were written by Walter B. Palmer. The idea for the manual was conceived by J. Marshall Mayer (City College of New York, 1884), who at the time was the managing editor of the Scroll. The first pledge manual was printed in 1886 and contained only 56 pages. Since few copies were published and it is the first membership manual of any fraternity, it is regarded as one of the most rare and valuable books of its kind. The 4th–6th editions were authored by Arthur R. Priest. Much of the present-day material is derived from these editions.

=== 20th century ===
Members of Phi Delta Theta at United States Military Academy in West Point, New York in 1917, prior to their deployment in World War I

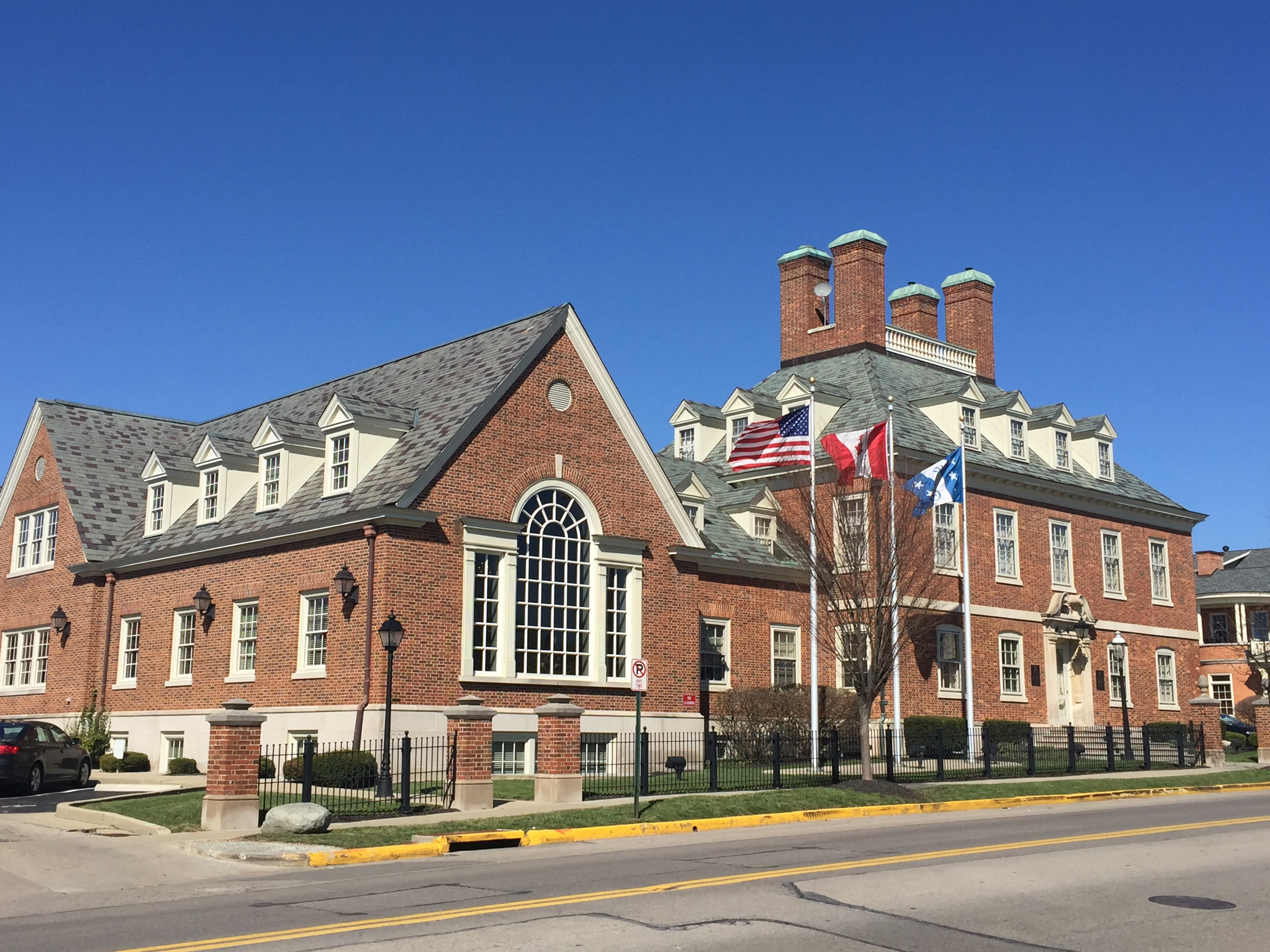
Phi Delta Theta headquarters in Oxford, Ohio

With constant expansion into the Western United States, Phi Delta Theta became an international fraternity when the organization's first chapter in Canada, the Quebec Alpha, was installed at McGill University in Montreal, Quebec on April 5, 1902. Phi Delta Theta was being a founding member of the North American Interfraternity Conference, in 1910. By 1918, there were 78 chapters with a membership of 77,000.

At the outbreak of World War I, college administrators urged its undergraduate members to stay in school. However, many were eager to enlist. The first Phis to fight in the war were members of the chapters at the University of Toronto and McGill University, the fraternity's only Canadian chapters during that period. By the time the United States entered the war in 1917, over 5000 Phis served in the conflict with 155 of them losing their lives. Because many of the undergraduate Phis put their studies on hold, many chapter houses either had limited occupants or none at all. To prevent losing houses pending the return of Phis from the war, many housing corporations consented to have the houses used as barracks or for YMCA programs.

During the 1920s and 1930s, expansion was carefully controlled. Focus was placed on re-activating chapters whose charters were revoked years earlier.

World War II exacted a heavy toll on the membership and operations of the fraternity. Many undergraduate members joined the military, and 13 chapters were closed. As active membership declined, most of the Phi Delt houses were used as women's residence halls or became makeshift military quarters. A newsletter, The Fighting Phi News, was sent to members whose contact information was known to the fraternity.

Fifty Phi generals and admirals served in the United States and Canada during the conflict, the most for any fraternity. Prominent among them were General Edward P. King, leader of the U.S. and Filipino forces in Bataan, Philippines; Admiral Robert L. Ghormley, commander of the Guadalcanal campaign; and Admiral John S. McCain Sr., commander of carrier task forces in the Pacific. Members of Phi Delta Theta also received every major military decoration in both the United States and British Commonwealth forces, including the Medal of Honor (MOH) awarded to Leon Vance of the Army Air Corps and the Victoria Cross (VC) to Robert Hampton Gray, a Canadian naval aviator. Vance's MOH was the last to be awarded before the D-Day landings, and Gray was both the last military personnel to receive the VC in the war and the last Canadian to lose his life during the war.

But the line will not be broken, because the fraternity's life is continuous, with a mystic cord binding one generation to another.

— Hilton U. Brown, past president of the fraternity speaking on the participation of Phis in World War II

Members of the fraternity also played a crucial role on the home front. Among those were Elmer Davis, the head of the Office of War Information; Byron Price, the head of the Office of Censorship; and Ted Gamble, the National Director of the War Finance Division.

When World War II ended, the fraternity experienced a surge in membership as many veterans attended college under the GI Bill. On December 15, 1945, the groundbreaking of the present-day General Headquarters building took place. One of the features of the headquarters was a permanent war memorial honoring all Phis who lost their lives during WWII and previous wars.

After the end of World War II, the fraternity was confronted with the social changes sweeping college campuses in the United States. Like many fraternities, Phi Delta Theta had a restrictive clause barring membership to African Americans, Asians, Jews, and Muslims. Specifically the term "white persons of full Aryan blood" was the subject of strong opposition among many members in light of Nazi ideology in the recently fought war, although there had been dissenting voices regarding this long before the clause became controversial among its members. This clause was added to the Code of Phi Delta Theta in 1910. However, by the 1946 convention, there was an open discussion regarding this topic. Impassioned sentiment from many alumni as well as undergraduates coupled with the changing demographic of the college scene caused Phi Delta Theta to re-examine its membership. Years of debate followed; however, by 1954, Phi Delta Theta eliminated the clause and became one of the first fraternities to eliminate any restriction based on race, color, or creed. Only a year earlier, Phi Delta Theta had suspended its chapters at Amherst and Williams College for pledging minorities.

The 1950s saw a period of rapid growth and an expansion of the internal operations of the fraternity. Twelve new schools were granted chapter status. An important change in leadership also occurred during this time. In 1955, Paul Beam, the executive vice president of the fraternity (the head of the fraternity's daily operations) unexpectedly died. He had succeeded the position of Arthur R. Priest who had served 1923–1937. Beam guided the fraternity through eight conventions and the trials of World War II. Bob Miller, who was Beam's assistant, was eventually chosen to take over by the General Council and assumed the office almost immediately. He would go on to serve for 36 years, which is currently the longest term served in that office.

Two important programs were developed during this period that would profoundly affect the fraternity's services. Before Beam died, he and several province presidents proposed a leadership convention for undergraduate members. These conventions would cover topics ranging from chapter organization to effective leadership. The first such convention was set up in 1956. At the time, it only involved 16 chapters. From 1956 until 1987, these sessions were held on a regional basis. The gatherings would form the basis of the Leadership College founded in 1987. 1958 was an important year for the fraternity because an educational foundation was created, the main purpose of which was to provide scholarships to deserving students.

During the turbulent 1960s, Phi Delta Theta along with other social fraternities dealt with a strong anti-fraternity sentiment from people who saw the Greek-lettered communities as old-world-established institutions. This sentiment was not without reason. Although Phi Delta Theta attempted to revise its restrictive membership codes in the wake of World War II, as late as 1961 the national office made headlines by rejecting the pledge of a Jewish student at Lake Forest College. Later that same year the University of Wisconsin banned Phi Delta Theta from campus for barring Jews, African Americans, and other minorities from membership.

Despite an overall decline in fraternity membership during the late 1960s, Phi Delta Theta continued to expand through a carefully controlled process known as "colonization." In 1968, a historic initiation took place when Robert Wise, Academy Award winning director of The Sound of Music and West Side Story, was initiated in the Franklin College chapter. Wise had completed all membership requirements in 1932 but was forced to withdraw from college due to a lack of funds. Roger D. Branigin, the Governor of Indiana at the time and Phi Delt member, presided over the ceremonies. 1969 was an eventful year for the fraternity as Neil Armstrong, a graduate from the Purdue University chapter, became the first man to walk on the Moon. During the Moon landing, Armstrong carried with him a fraternity badge, which he subsequently donated to the General Headquarters of the fraternity. He also donated a small silk flag of the fraternity, which he carried with him on his Gemini flight in 1966.

As war raged in Vietnam, Phis again served in the armed forces. With the emergence of new technology, a significant percentage opted to become fighter pilots. The Vietnam War saw a small dip in the Fraternity's membership; however, by 1972, the fraternity had 140 active chapters with over 128,000 initiates. An important change was made during the 1970s that gave more autonomy to chapters in terms of membership selection. An amendment was passed wherein the unanimous vote rule to allow a college man to become a pledge was changed to allow individual chapters to decide on their own which method best suited their respective chapters. In 1973, the fraternity celebrated its 125th anniversary. The special occasion was marked by the construction of the university gates at Miami University. To date, nine buildings on the campus were either constructed by Phi Delta Theta or named after members.

The 1980s saw the fraternity deal with issues such as hazing, rising insurance costs, and maintenance of individual chapter operations. The unofficial theme of the 1980 convention was "Eliminate Hazing." The decade was marked by an increase in lawsuits dealing with hazing and alcohol abuse among many fraternities. To deal with this issue, Phi Delta Theta instituted a comprehensive insurance policy to protect its chapters. During the 1980s, an important aspect of the fraternity was created: Leadership consultants. The consultants, who are recent college graduates, travel to assigned provinces and assist various chapters in many aspects of fraternity life and chapter operations. They also report the status of each visited chapter to the general headquarters.

An important leadership change occurred at the beginning of the 1990s when Robert Biggs became the fourth executive vice president of the fraternity after Robert Miller stepped down. During the decade, Phi Delta Theta and many other fraternities experienced a decline in membership. The most important policy to be implemented by the fraternity during the decade was the decision made in 1997 to have all chapter facilities alcohol free by 2000. It was an initiative that was strongly pursued by the 1996–1998 General Council. The policy was in response to the growing insurance claims against the fraternity, 53% of which were alcohol-related, and a return to the core values of the organization.

=== 21st century ===
In 2002, Phi Delta Theta, along with Kappa Sigma and Phi Sigma Kappa left the North American Interfraternity Conference due to ideological differences. Fraternity officials had been concerned of the direction of the conference for six years before leaving. Phi Delta Theta officials believed that the conference had been placing too much emphasis on individual undergraduates through specific programs such as leadership conferences rather than focusing on the fraternity movement as a whole. Phi Sigma Kappa has since re-joined the NIC.

In 2005, the fraternity issued a progress report. Significant improvements have occurred in many areas of fraternity life and operations. Since the implementation of the alcohol-free housing policy, the undergraduate grade point average rose from 2.77 in 2000 to nearly 3.00 in 2005. The insurance premiums of individual members have also gone down as risk management violations have decreased. Perhaps the most telling area is in membership, where Phi Delta Theta showed an increase in new members. In 2004, Phi Delta Theta had 3,102 new members while other fraternities averaged 2,415. In 1990, chapters of Phi Delta Theta were 18% larger than the typical fraternity chapter. In 2004, they were 30% larger. Also, in 2004, Phi Delta Theta was one of only 13 national/international fraternities to show an increase in total undergraduates from the previous year with an increase of 4.2%. The significance of this is highlighted by the fact that Phi Delta Theta had fewer chapters than other fraternities. Competitively, Phi Delta Theta has remained a constant among others. In terms of new members, it ranked ninth in 1990, eighth in 2000, and ninth in 2004. Many alumni members have credited the alcohol-free housing policy with continuing this trend.

== Symbols ==
Phi Delta Theta's motto is Εἷς ἀνὴρ οὐδεὶς ἀνήρ. Its slogan is "One man is no man". The fraternity's badge is a shield, that has an eye in its upper field and a scroll with the Greek letters ΦΔΘ in the lower field, with a sword in back.

The fraternity's colors are azure and argent. Its flag consists of three vertical bars, with the center bar being white with the Greek letters ΦΔΘ in blue. Its two outer bars are blue with three five-pointed stars in white.

Its flower is the white carnation. Its patron Greek deity is Pallas Athena and her owl. Its nicknames are Phi Delts and Phis.

The Scroll of Phi Delta Theta is the official magazine for members of the fraternity, first published in 1875. The Palladium was a private annual magazine specifically for members of Phi Delta Theta. Its first issue was printed in 1894 and the last issue was released in the mid-1960s.

=== Famous firsts ===
Phi Delta Theta instituted several policies and traditions that are not only still used by the fraternity today, but have also become standard among almost all fraternities, as well as sororities.

- First fraternity to adopt a pledge pin – adopted by the 1894 convention in Indianapolis, Indiana
- First fraternity to adopt an alumnus pin – adopted by the 1894 convention in Indianapolis, Indiana
- First fraternity to adopt a pledge manual – authored by Walter B. Palmer in 1886
- First fraternity to adopt a National Day of Celebration – adopted by the General Council in 1889
- First fraternity to adopt life subscriptions to the fraternity magazine – instituted by William Bates, the first editor of The Scroll in 1875
- First national fraternity to expand west of the Mississippi River – a charter was given to Austin College in 1853

== Chapters ==
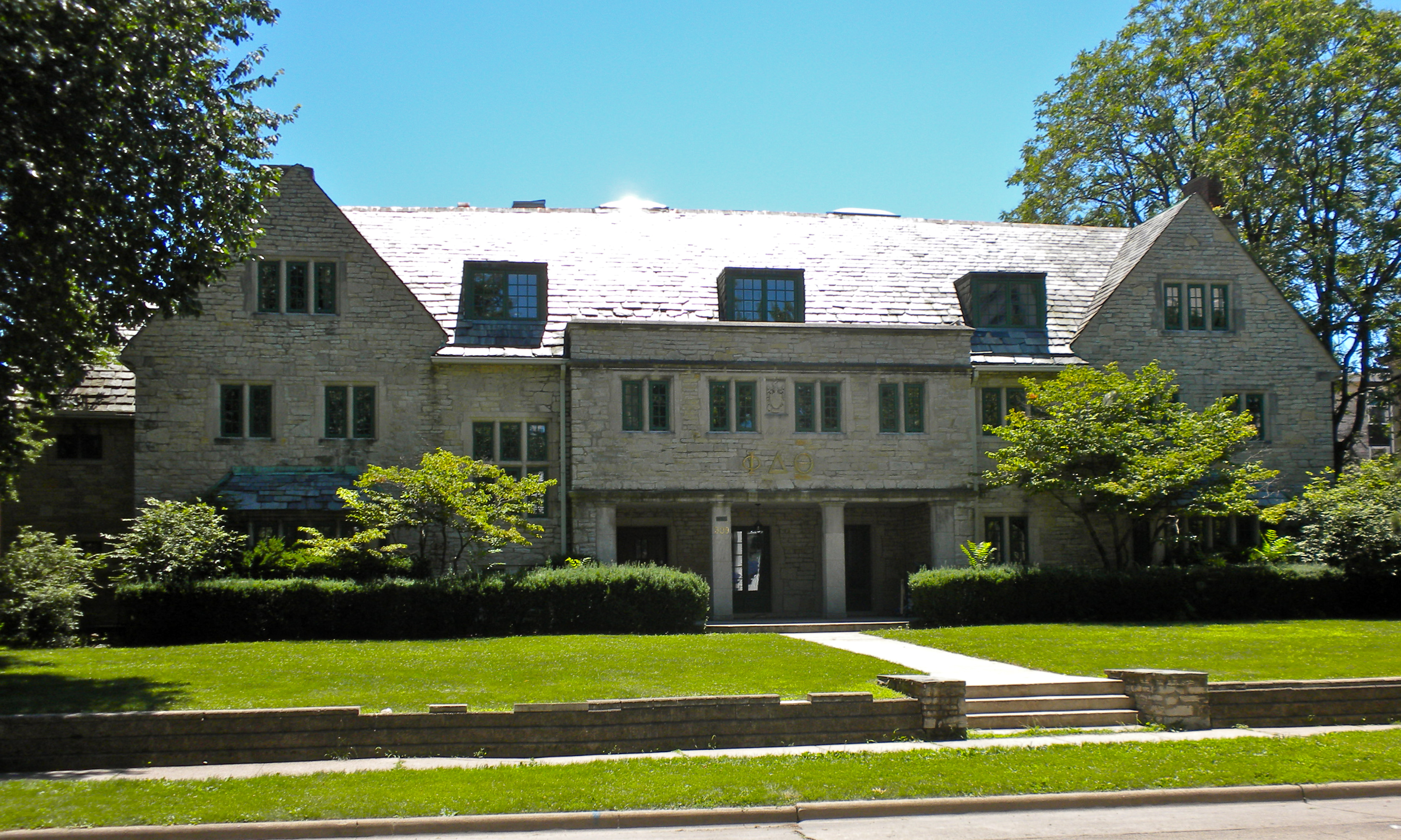
University of Illinois chapter house, listed on the National Register of Historic Places

=== Undergraduate chapters ===
See List of Phi Delta Theta chapters

Since 1848, Phi Delta Theta has granted more than 285 charters across the United States and Canada. Today, there are over 191 active chapters and colonies. To be granted a charter, a colony must complete certain requirements set forth by the General Council. Chief among these are recruiting a certain number of members and achieving a respectable cumulative grade point average among its members. Phi Delta Theta also has the longest continuous chapter of any fraternity in the United States, that chapter being the Kentucky Alpha Delta chapter at Centre College, which was established in 1850 and is still active today. The largest chapter of Phi Delta Theta is at Indiana University with, on average, 160 active brothers and has been active since 1849.

=== Alumni chapters ===
Currently, Phi Delta Theta has over 100 active alumni clubs. Although all the clubs are currently in North America, alumni clubs have been found all over the world throughout its history. At one point, there were over 165 alumni chapters, some as far away as China. The most Phis to ever assemble on foreign land for an alumni club meeting, before the fraternity became international in 1902, was in Manila, Philippines when 30 Phis gathered in 1899. The alumni club in the Philippines lasted for nearly 40 years.

== Membership ==
Membership in Phi Delta Theta is open to all qualified men without concern for race, religion, or ethnicity. Initial membership to the fraternity is contingent upon receiving an invitation to an interested individual from members of an active chapter. A pledge of Phi Delta Theta is called a Phikeia. Previously the pledge period lasted a minimum of eight weeks. During the 2025 Convention this was reduced to a four week period, with the General Council allowed to make exemptions, to fit university requirements. The pledge period is a time when the prospective member learns about the fraternity history, structure, traditions, organization as well as social etiquette. Phi Delta Theta has a strict policy against hazing and does not tolerate chapters that violate the policy. Once initiated, a brother is entitled to all rights and privileges of fraternity membership unless he formally resigns or is expelled.

== Activities ==
The Kleberg Emerging Leaders Institute (Kleberg) is an annual event held at the fraternity's headquarters during the summer where newly initiated undergraduates are instructed leadership classes, as well as participating in programs that help to improve their respective chapters.

Phi Delta Theta has close connections with two sororities: Delta Gamma and Delta Zeta.

== Philanthropy ==
For many years, Phi Delta Theta had no official philanthropy. The fraternity, however, was long associated with the ALS Association (ALSA) because of Lou Gehrig, an alumnus who died of the disease. Amytrophic lateral sclerosis (ALS) is a debilitating neuro-muscular disease and has since become known as Lou Gehrig's disease. Although there had always existed a relationship between ALSA and Phi Delta Theta, it was not until November 2002 that the General Council made the partnership official. Undergraduate and alumni chapters from all across North America regularly organize events to raise money for research. In August 2017, Phi Delta Theta terminated its partnership with ALSA and elected to proceed with creating its ALS-related charity. But now they have elected to work closely with the LiveLikeLou Foundation to succeed in leaving ALS better than they found it.

Phi Delta Theta and many other fraternities have an educational foundation fund. Part of the Phi Delta Theta Foundation's aim is to award scholarships to deserving undergraduate members and those pursuing advanced degrees in various graduate schools. Each year, it provides over $150,000 in scholarships. The foundation, which was established in 1962 with only $4,708, has since grown to over $14 million.

== Governance ==
All powers of the fraternity, both legislative and supreme, rest within the General Convention. The convention is a biennial event attended by representatives of undergraduate chapters, alumni chapters, and various foundations. The purpose of the convention is to discuss and vote on a wide range of issues affecting the fraternity. The convention is held in various cities across North America. It is also during the convention where the General Council is elected.

The General Council is the governing body of Phi Delta Theta. Its all-volunteer members are elected every two years during the fraternity's convention. Their chief responsibility is to act as the executive and administrative board of the fraternity. Their duties include the granting and suspending of charters.

The General Headquarters (GHQ) is responsible for the daily operations of the fraternity. Among its many duties, GHQ collects dues, distributes supplies, and tries to maintain up-to-date information about all its members. Unlike other entities within the fraternity, the staff of GHQ are paid for their services. While the main offices of GHQ are held by members of the fraternity, support staff need not be members. The head of GHQ is the executive vice president, who acts as the secretary to the General Council.

== Controversies and member misconduct ==
=== 19th century ===
- In 1852, the Kappa chapter of Delta Kappa Epsilon (DKE) was formed at Miami University after a disagreement among Phi Delta Theta members over prohibiting alcohol. In 1854, two years later, another disagreement in this group led to another break-away. A schism over who would become a Poet for the Erodelphian Literary Society led to the founding of Sigma Chi in 1855.

=== 20th century ===
- In 1924, Charles Lamkin, a former international president of Phi Delta Theta, was instrumental in the formation of a new national fraternity called Theta Kappa Nu, and in recruiting some 30 local fraternities to become chapters of Theta Kappa Nu during its first two years. No mention was made in print of his work at the time (obviously a sensitive issue); but he was listed, along with the Four Founders of Theta Kappa Nu, as one of the first five to have a lifetime subscription to the fraternity's magazine. Having chartered 55 chapters, Theta Kappa Nu merged with Lambda Chi Alpha in 1939.
- On the morning of May 15, 1954, near the end of an all-night drinking party held at the home of the fraternity's University of North Carolina at Chapel Hill chapter, member and senior G. "Putnam" Davis, Jr. (23) pulled out his pistol without reason and wounded two other fraternity members: sophomores William H. Joyner (20) and Allen B. Long (21) before going to his bedroom on the third floor and committing suicide.

=== 21st century ===
- In June 2000, when Phi Delta Theta announced the inception of an alcohol-free housing policy, the announcement was met both with hope and skepticism. While some saw the banning of alcohol in housing facilities as a welcome return to the principles on which the fraternity was founded, others felt the drastic cultural shift would hurt social dynamics. The General Council and GHQ had expected resistance from both alumni and undergraduate members when it was first proposed. Among the most vocal chapters against the policy were the University of Virginia chapter, where a faction split off from Phi Delta Theta and chose to form a separate local fraternity known as the Phi Society, and the University of the South chapter, which formed the Phi Society of 1883 rather than adopt the policy. Phi Delta Theta returned to the University of Virginia one year later and formed a new chapter that operates alongside the still active Phi Society Chapter. Phi Delta Theta has not returned to the University of the South.
- In 2012, a new member at Northwestern University was hospitalized with a broken nose, fractured in four places as a result of being forced by the fraternity to participate in a fight as hazing. After an investigation of this and other hazing incidents, the fraternity chapter was placed on deferred suspension until June 17, 2016.
- In 2013, Emory University voted to ban the fraternity from the campus for four years due to repeated hazing violations and misconduct. New members were forced to participate in "fight club", and "successfully" consume high amounts of alcohol to prove their masculinity and sleep on the floor in the fraternity house's basement in only their underwear.
- In 2016, the chapter at the University of Chicago was sued by a former new member who alleged hazing.
- In 2016, the chapter at Baylor University was suspended after its president, Jacob Walter Anderson, was charged with sexual assault and rape of a woman who was unconscious at a party the fraternity hosted. The fraternity was cited for providing alcohol to underage students.
- In 2017, the chapter at Louisiana State University was suspended, along with all Greek life at LSU (per university president), after a new member was rushed to the hospital where he later succumbed to alcohol poisoning and died. Suspected hazing; alcohol abuse in addition to THC was found in his urine. Later, ten people were arrested and charged with hazing, and one was charged with negligent homicide in the death.
- In 2018, the chapter at Washington University in St. Louis was permanently suspended after an AR-15 semi-automatic weapon was found in the house. They had previously been temporarily suspended because of a hazing incident and had repeatedly violated this suspension by hosting unsanctioned social events.
- In 2022, the chapter at University of Kansas was suspended for several years due to extreme verbal, emotional, and physical abuse of pledges. One of several disturbing incidents reported included a pledge being strong-armed into watching a video with a gruesome scene of a dolphin's slaughter. That pledge's name, from then on, became "Dolphin."
- In fall of 2024, the chapter at North Carolina State University was suspended until 2028 for instances of hazing.

== Notable members ==
See List of Phi Delta Theta members

Famous Phis

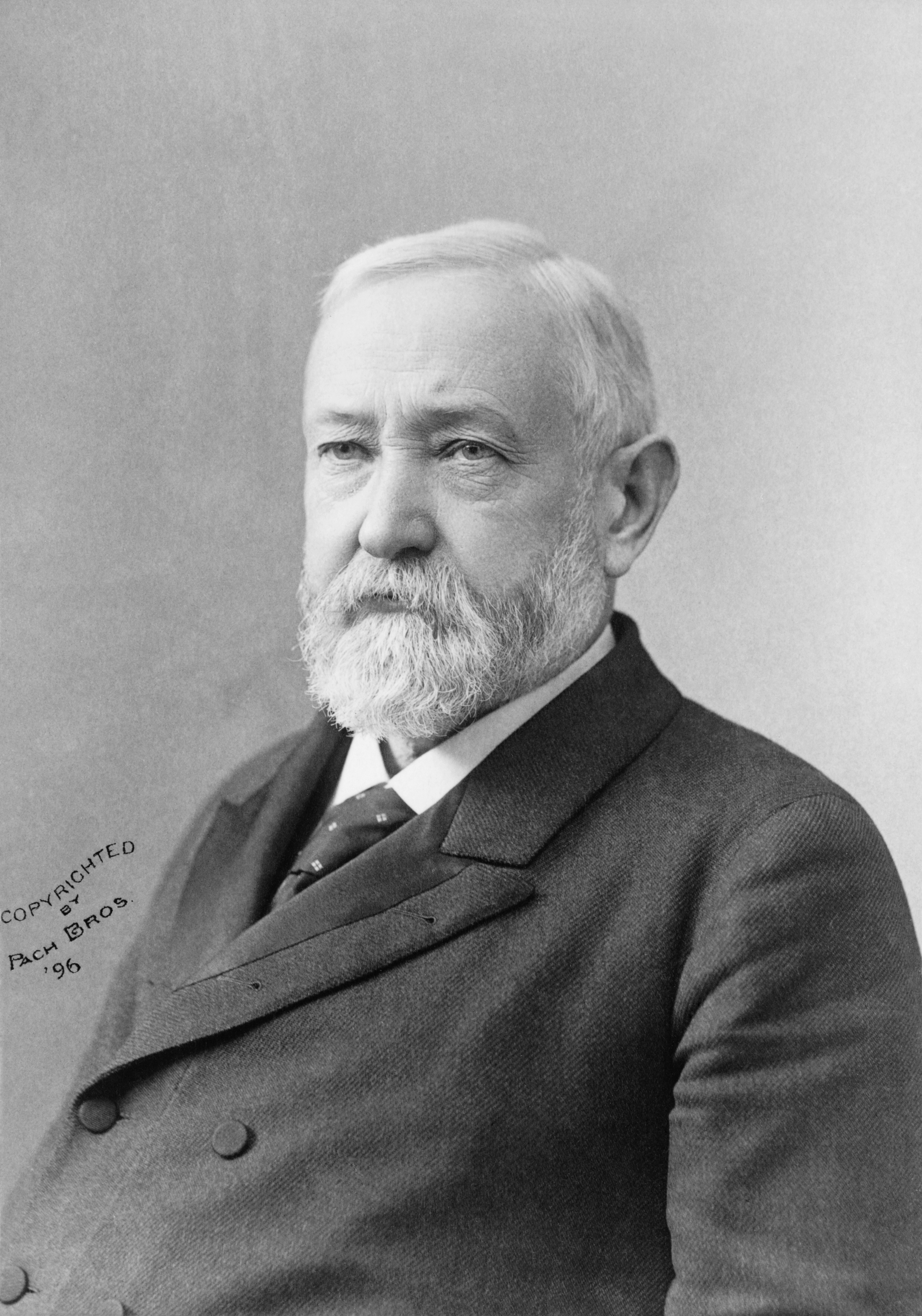
Benjamin Harrison
23rd President of the U.S.

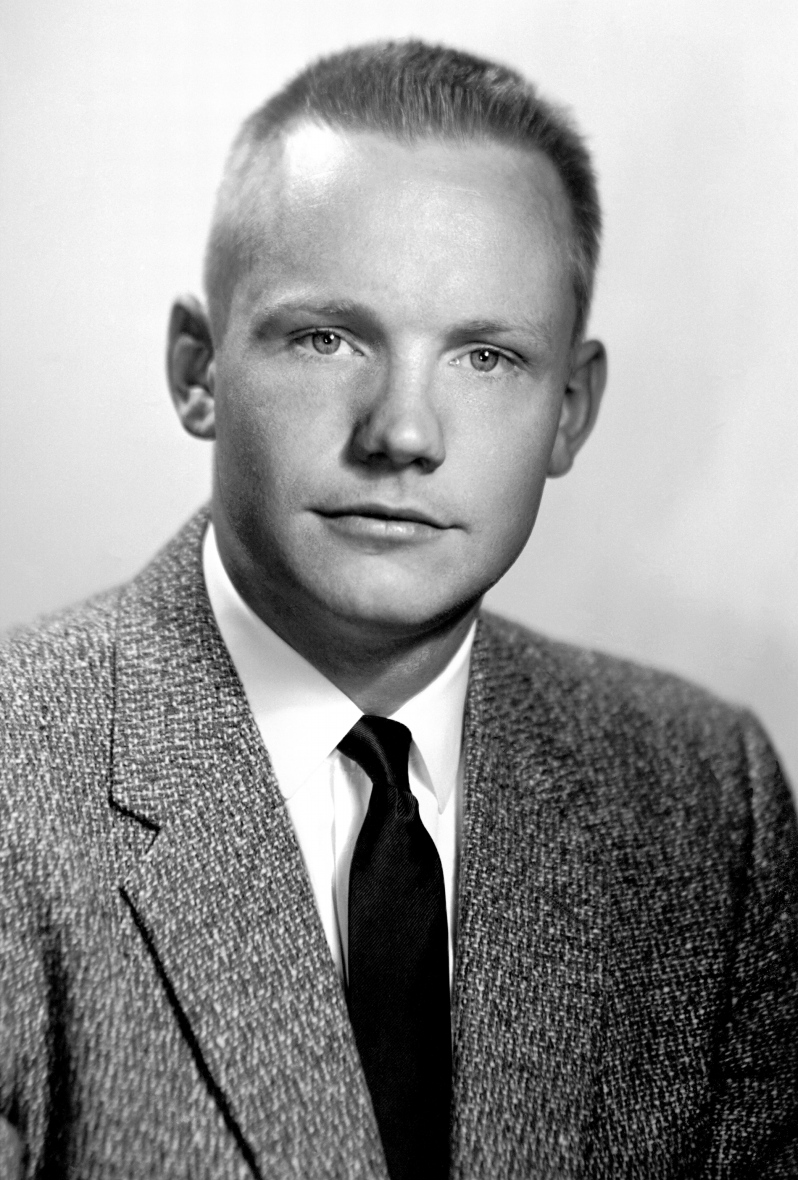
Neil Armstrong
First man to walk on the Moon

Members of Phi Delta Theta have held numerous political positions in the United States, including the presidency, vice presidency, and speakership of the House of Representatives. In Canada, fraternity members have served in many levels of government. Members have won major awards in science and entertainment, and have also gained prominence in areas such as architecture, medicine, and sports. Throughout the years, many prominent members have kept a vested interest in the events and operations of Phi Delta Theta. President Harrison, for example, participated in three Phi Delt banquets during his presidency while Medal of Honor recipient General Frederick Funston was the guest speaker at certain chapter installations.

The number of members who have either been involved in armed conflict or have achieved prominence in their respective professions has been documented throughout the years. As of November 2014, the following statistics are the involvement of its members in various fields.

14,000+ members served in World War II	8 members have won a Pulitzer Prize
5,000+ members served in World War I	9 members have won an Emmy Award
400+ members have played professional football	6 members are enshrined in the MLB Hall of Fame
286 members served in the Spanish–American War	6 members are enshrined in the NFL Hall of Fame
281 members served in the American Civil War	3 members have been NASA astronauts
200+ members have obtained the rank of General or Admiral	3 members have won an Academy Award
117 members have been United States Congressmen	3 members have won a Heisman Trophy
34 members have been state governors	3 members have served as justices of the Supreme Court of the United States
33 members have been United States Senators	2 members have been Canadian Premiers
15 members have stars on the Hollywood Walk of Fame	1 member served as President of the United States
9 members have received the Medal of Honor or Victoria Cross	1 member served as Vice President of the United States
1 member has won the Nobel Prize

== See also ==
- List of social fraternities and sororities
