= Wendell L. Wylie =

American orthodontist

Wendell L. Wylie (December 5, 1913 – February 19, 1966) was an American orthodontist who served as a President of American Board of Orthodontics and the Chief Editor for The Angle Orthodontist Journal.

== Life ==
He was born in Elk River, Idaho. He received his college degree in 1936 from the College of Wooster, Ohio. After graduating, he entered the Case School of Dental Medicine under the mentorship of his father, who was the dean of the college at that time. He earned his dental degree in 1940. He then pursued a degree in Orthodontics and finally received his Masters from the University of Illinois at Chicago College of Dentistry in 1942. After that, he served as the Chairman of the Orthodontic Department at the UCSF School of Dentistry until 1956. After giving up the position in 1962, he went into private practice with Norman Snyder in San Mateo, California for Orthodontics.

During his career, he was a member of the Charles Tweed Foundation and a fellow of the American College of Dentists. In addition, he received the highest honor in Orthodontics in 1965 when he received the Albert H. Ketcham Memorial Award for Excellence. Wylie put forth the concept of malocclusion as malformation instead of a malady. In his papers, he argued that the malformation reflects a deviation from morphology.

He died at the age of 52 in 1966.

== Positions held ==
- American Board of Orthodontics, Director, 1954-1961
- American Board of Orthodontics, Secretary, 1955 - 1960
- American Board of Orthodontics, President, 1960-1961
- The Angle Orthodontist, Chief Editor, 1947-1952
- Edward H. Angle Society of Orthodontia, Secretary, 1961-1963
