= Robert Morrison (Phi Delta Theta) =

American minister and fraternity founder

- Born: March 15, 1822; Ohio, U.S.
- Died: July 22, 1902 (aged 80); Fulton, Missouri, U.S.
- Education: Ohio University Miami University; McCormick Theological Seminary Princeton Theological Seminary
- Occupations: Minister, editor, and educator

Robert Morrison, D.D. (March 15, 1822 – July 27, 1902) was an American Presbyterian minister, educator, and editor who was the principal founder of the Phi Delta Theta international college fraternity, suggesting the fraternity's creation and co-authoring the fraternity document known as The Bond.

== Early life ==
Morrison grew up in Ohio and entered Ohio University in 1839 as a scholarship student. He attended Ohio University for two years, returning home to help on the family farm and to teach school. He entered Miami University in 1846 and conceived the idea for the Phi Delta Theta fraternity, which he founded with five other students on December 26, 1848. He later attended McCormick Theological Seminary and Princeton Theological Seminary.

== Career ==
Morrison's career as a minister, editor of religious publications, and teacher took him to Tennessee, Kentucky, Ohio, and Missouri. He edited the Louisville Presbyterian Herald from 1854 to 1860. He was also co-editor of the Louisville True Presbyterian, which was suppressed by Union military authorities in 1863, during the American Civil War.

In September 1869, Morrison established Westminster Academy, a co-educational school in Waterford, Ohio, where he was principal for six years. He was also the principal of Poplar Grove Academy in Rutherford County, Tennessee. He combined his teaching duties with regular preaching. From 1879 to 1881 he worked as a financial agent to eliminate the debts of Westminster College and established the Phi Delta Theta Missouri Beta Chapter, in Fulton, Missouri. After this he preached at various locations around Missouri, and founded churches in towns such as Gravois Mills and Tuscumbia.

== Honors ==
Miami University conferred a Doctor of Divinity to Morrison in 1897.

== Personal life ==
Morrison died at his home near Fulton, Missouri in 1902, Phi Delta Theta paid off Morrison's mortgage and provided an endowment to his widow.
