= Sindelsdorf =

- Municipality
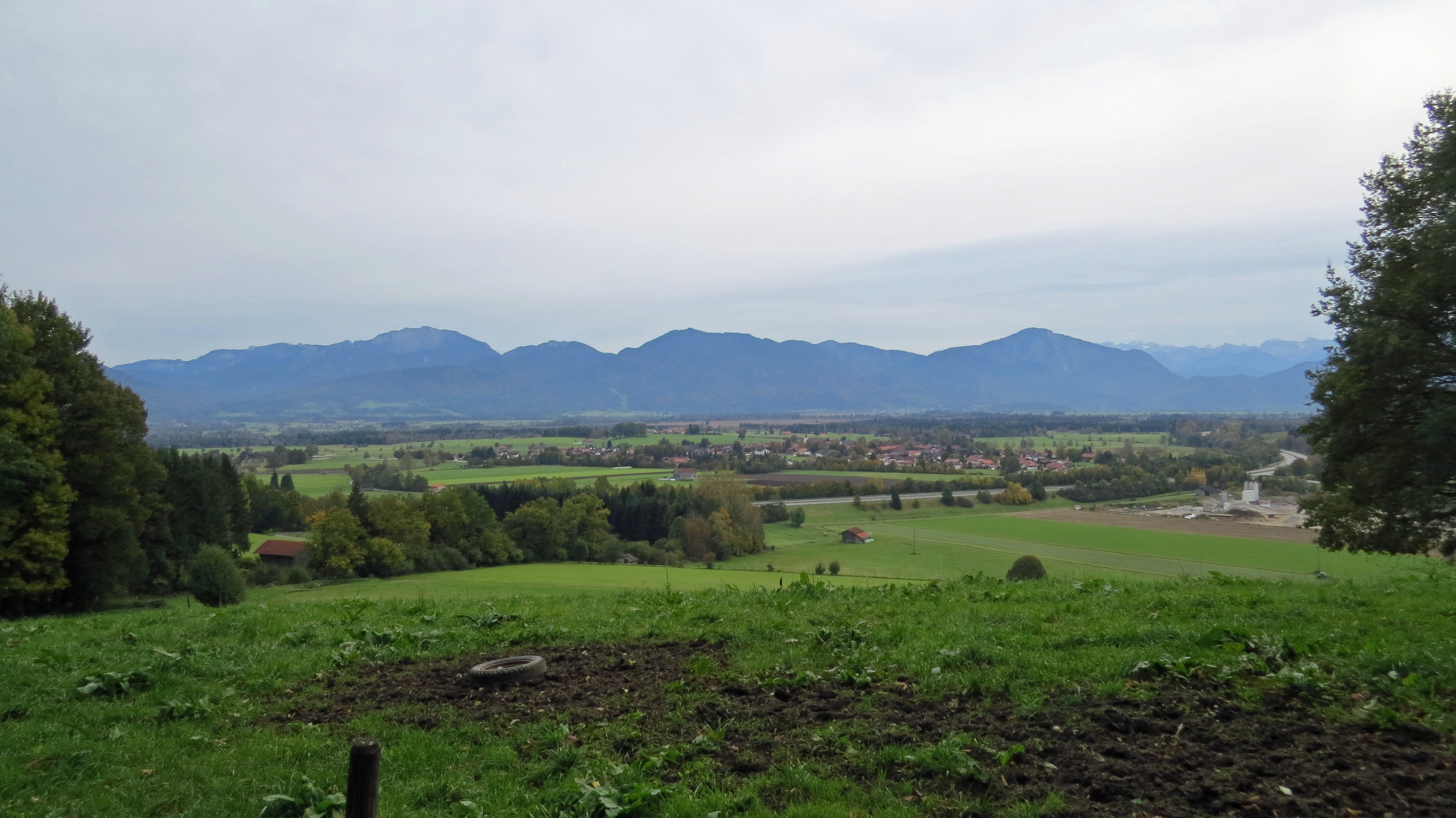
- Sindelsdorf seen from the northwest

- Coat of arms

- Location of Sindelsdorf within Weilheim-Schongau district
- Interactive map of Sindelsdorf
- Location within Germany Location within Bavaria
- Coordinates: 47°43′24″N 11°19′57″E
- Country: Germany
- State: Bavaria
- Admin. region: Oberbayern
- District: Weilheim-Schongau
- Municipal assoc.: Habach

Government
  - Mayor (2020–26): Andreas Obermaier

Area
  - Total: 17.50 km^{2} (6.76 sq mi)
- Elevation: 609 m (1,998 ft)

Population (2025-12-31)
  - Total: 1,189
  - Density: 67.94/km^{2} (176.0/sq mi)
- Time zone: UTC+01:00 (CET)
  - Summer (DST): UTC+02:00 (CEST)
- Postal codes: 82404
- Dialling codes: 08856
- Vehicle registration: WM
- Website: www.sindelsdorf.de

Sindelsdorf is a municipality in the Weilheim-Schongau district, in Bavaria, Germany.

== People who have worked on the ground ==
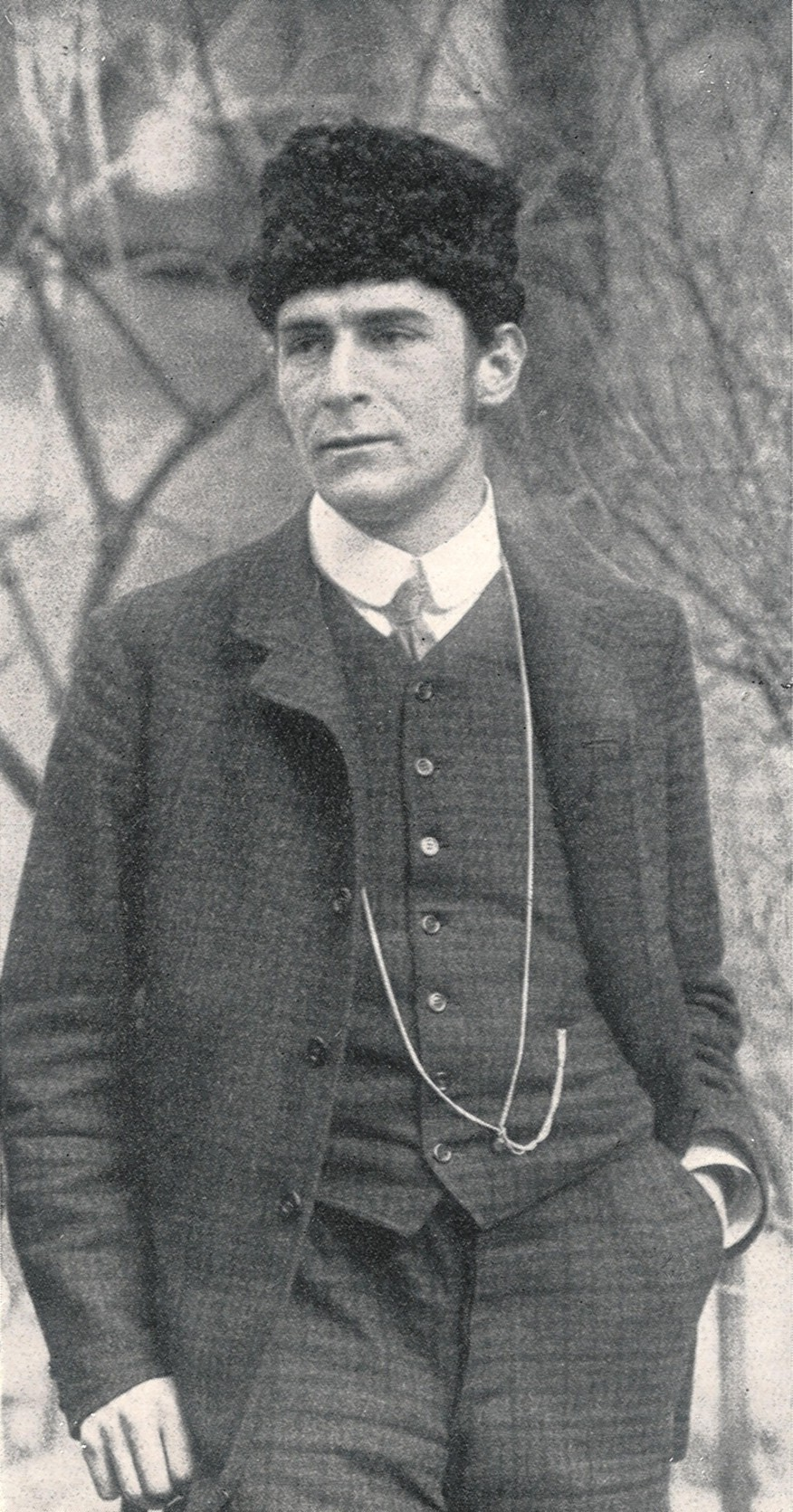
Franz Marc in 1910

- Heinrich Campendonk (1889-1957), German-Dutch painter and member Der Blaue Reiter, in Sindelsdorf from 1911 to 1916
- Franz Marc (1880-1916), German expressionist painter and founder of the Der Blaue Reiter

== See also ==
- Fichtsee
