= J. Campbell White =

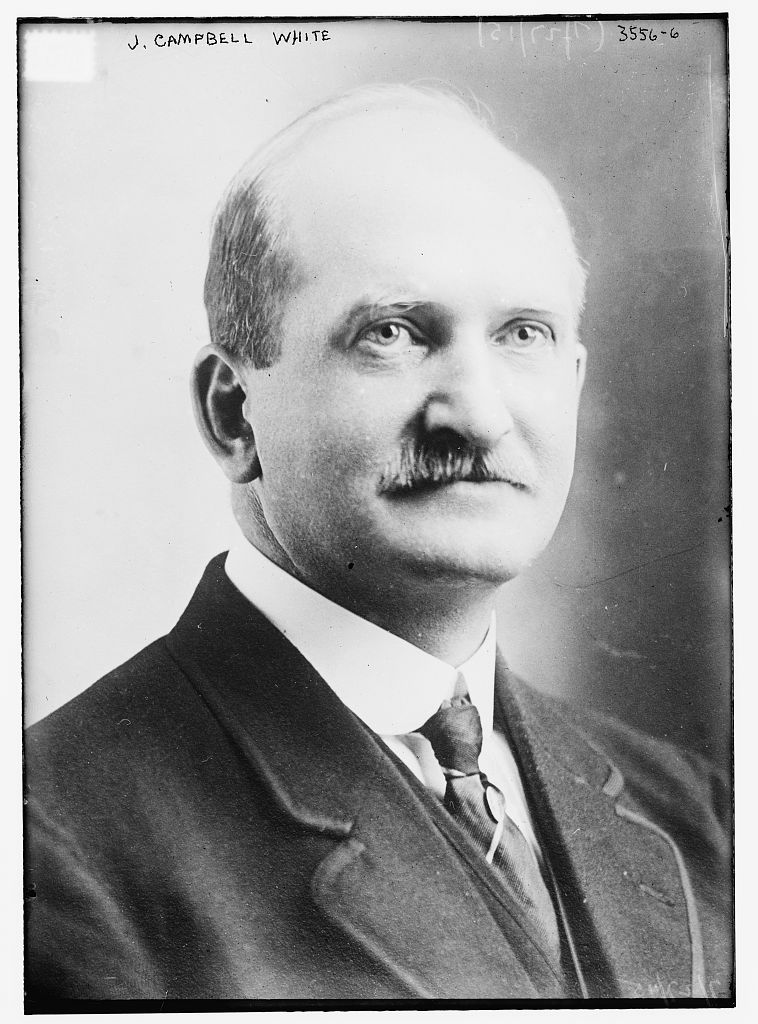
- J. Campbell White
- Born: March 31, 1870; Wooster, Ohio
- Died: March 24, 1962 (aged 91); Monroe, Ohio
- Education: College of Wooster
- Known for: President of College of Wooster

J. Campbell White (March 31, 1870 – March 24, 1962) was a General Secretary of the YMCA in Calcutta and an American President of the College of Wooster in Ohio.

== Biography ==
He was born on March 31, 1870, to John May White in Wooster, Ohio.

White went to Wooster College in Ohio. He left to be a secretary of a YMCA and then went on to be the General Secretary of the YMCA in Calcutta.

He was invited to return to his alma mater as President. He was the President from 1915 to 1919. He became a minister of the Presbyterian Church in his 60s. His life was driven by service rather than his career.

White died in Monroe, Ohio, in 1962 at a rest home.
