= Edel Paragliders =

Defunct South Korean aircraft manufacturer

- Company type: Privately held company
- Industry: Aerospace
- Founded: 1990s
- Defunct: circa 2007
- Fate: Out of business
- Headquarters: Gwangju, South Korea
- Key people: CEO: Sung Heon Song
- Products: Paragliders
- Parent: Hispo Co, Ltd

Edel Paragliders was a South Korean aircraft manufacturer based in Gwangju and headed by Sung Heon Song. The company specialized in the design and manufacture of paragliders and paramotor wings in the form of ready-to-fly aircraft.

The company seems to have been founded in the 1990s and went out of business in about 2007.

The company was a subsidiary of the Hispo Company, Limited, which manufactured parachutes for military use and was established in 1982. Hispo also appears to be out of business.

Edel produced a very large range of paragliders and at one time was one of the world's largest manufacturers of them. In the mid-2000s they had 39 paraglider models in production, plus additional wings for paramotoring. Aircraft included the competition level Edel Ace, Excel and Millennium as well as the beginner's Be All and the intermediate level Live. The company also produced two-place gliders, like the Prime Bi.

== Aircraft ==
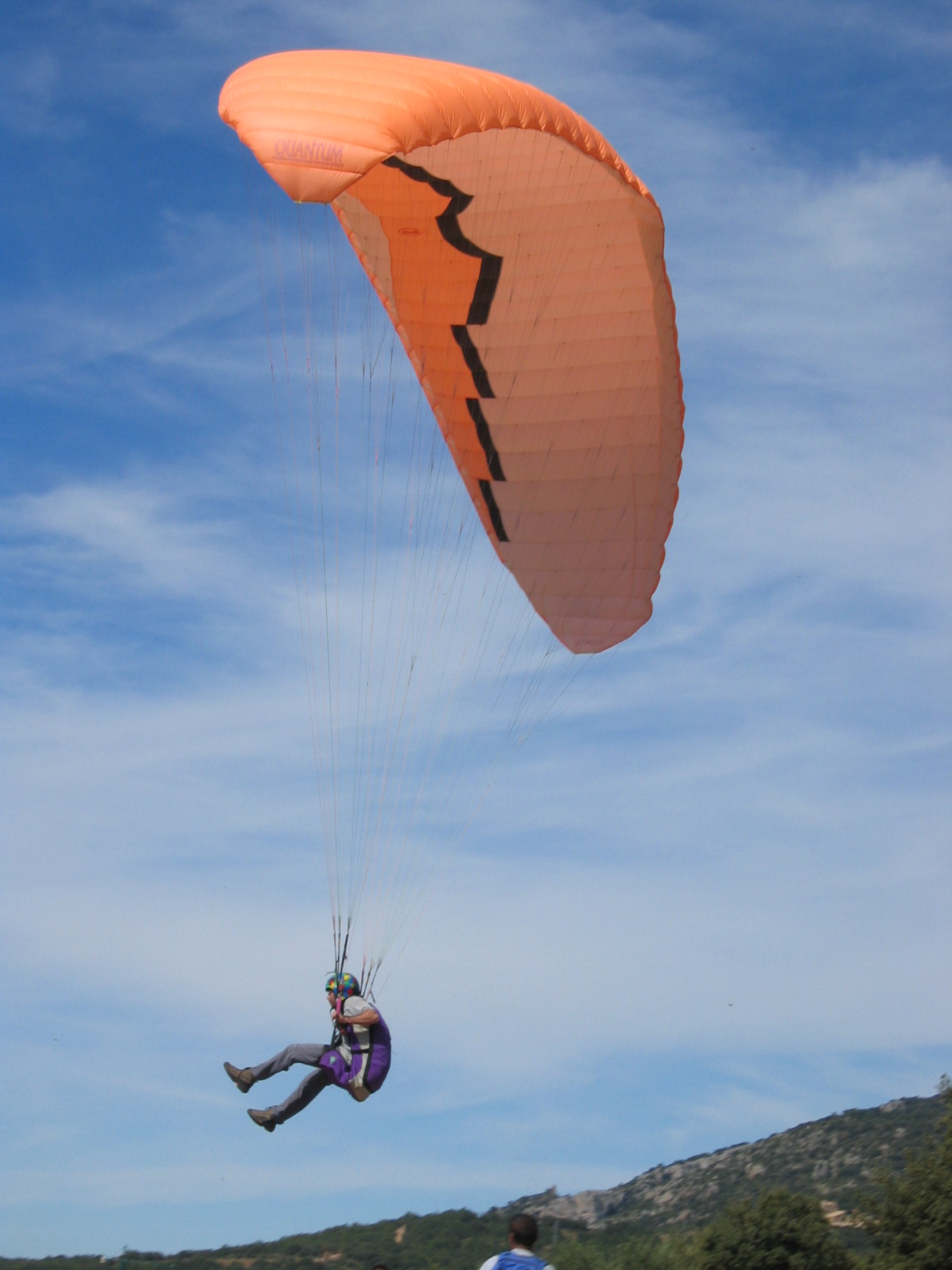
Edel Quantum paraglider

Summary of paragliders built by Edel:

- Edel 8000
- Edel Ace
- Edel Aerotik
- Edel Apollo
- Edel Atlas
- Edel Be All
- Edel Confidence
- Edel Control
- Edel Corvette
- Edel Course
- Edel Crazy
- Edel Energy
- Edel EQ
- Edel Excel
- Edel Galazy
- Edel Genious
- Edel Infinity
- Edel Jupiter
- Edel Live
- Edel Manta
- Edel Mercury
- Edel Millenium
- Edel Millennium
- Edel Mountain
- Edel Mustang
- Edel New
- Edel Orion
- Edel Peacock
- Edel Populair
- Edel Power Atlas
- Edel Prime
- Edel Prime Bi
- Edel Promise
- Edel Quantum
- Edel Racer
- Edel Rainbow
- Edel Response
- Edel Saber
- Edel Sector
- Edel Sector TX
- Edel Solo
- Edel Space
- Edel Stardust
- Edel Superspace
- Edel Wisdom
- Edel Weekend
- Edel ZX
- Edel ZX Bi
