= Alfred William Edel =

American journalist

- Born: July 30, 1935; Buffalo, New York, U.S.
- Died: July 3, 2005 (aged 69); St. George, Utah, U.S.
- Education: College of Wooster; Syracuse University
- Occupation: News broadcaster
- Spouse: Lee
- Children: 2

Alfred William "Al" Edel (July 30, 1935 – July 3, 2005) was a veteran news broadcaster who anchored the newscast for the Voice of America on shortwave radio.

== Biography ==
Al Edel was born in Buffalo, New York. He graduated from the College of Wooster in Ohio and received his master's in communications from Syracuse University. Edel worked for radio station, WBKW in Buffalo before moving to Frankfurt, Germany in 1960 to broadcast on the thirteen station American Forces Network in Europe. In 1966, he moved to New York City to join ABC Radio News to anchor the network's newscasts, which were broadcast across the United States. In 1969, Edel moved to Sioux Falls, South Dakota to anchor the television newscasts for KSOO-TV (later renamed KSFY-TV). In 1980, he moved to Washington, DC, where he worked at ABC as a news writer for Good Morning America. In 1982, Edel anchored the newscasts on the Voice of America shortwave radio service for eighteen years.

After his retirement in 2000, Al Edel moved to Utah. On July 3, 2005, he died of cancer at the age of 69 in a hospice in St. George, Utah.
