= Stephen J. Page =

American biomedical researcher, author, clinician, and science educator

- Occupations: Neurorehabilitation scientist, educator, occupational therapist, musician

Academic background
- Education: The College of Wooster, Ball State University, University of Tennessee, University of Findlay, Kessler Institute for Rehabilitation

Academic work
- Discipline: Neurorehabilitation, neuroscience, occupational therapy, physical therapy

Stephen J. Page is an American biomedical researcher, clinician, and educator, known for his research on motor recovery and neurorehabilitation after stroke, and continuing education and professional speaking on the topic of neurorehabilitation. Page developed stroke interventions such as modified constraint-induced movement therapy and applications of mental practice in neurorehabilitation, including the first application of mental practice to stroke survivors to increase neuroplasticity Page has authored scientific research articles about topics such as electrical stimulation, myoelectrics, outcome measurement, and neuromodulation. He has held academic appointments at The Ohio State University Medical Center and The University of Cincinnati College of Medicine.

A 2017 study in The American Journal of Occupational Therapy named Page the most-cited author in occupational therapy from 1991 to 2014.

In recent years Dr. Page has become a noted health and cultural writer.

== Education ==
Before earning a PhD in motor learning and control from The University of Tennessee in 1998, Page earned a Bachelor of Arts in 1993 from The College of Wooster and a Master of Science in exercise science from Ball State University in 1995.

Page completed a multidisciplinary post-doctoral fellowship in rehabilitation research at The Kessler Institute for Rehabilitation, where he subsequently worked as a clinical research scientist from 2000 to 2002.

In 2012, Page earned a Master's of Occupational Therapy degree from The University of Findlay.

== Career ==
Page has authored or co-authored more than 145 scholarly journal articles. According to Google Scholar, his research articles have been cited by over 11,500 publications as of May, 2025 and are cited approximately 500 times/year.

Page began his academic career at the University of Cincinnati College of Medicine's Department of Physical Medicine and Rehabilitation from 2002 to 2011 as Director of Research, Associate Professor in Physical Medicine and Rehabilitation, Rehabilitation Sciences, and Neurosciences, and Director of the Neuromotor Recovery and Rehabilitation Laboratory.

From 2011 to 2020, Page was a professor on the occupational therapy faculty at Ohio State University at the School of Health and Rehabilitation Sciences, where he created and co-directed the Ohio Neurorehabilitation Academy, assisted in co-creating the nation's first post graduate Neurological Fellowships for occupational therapists, and also directed the Better Rehabilitation and Assessment for Improved Neuro-recovery (B.R.A.I.N.) Laboratory/.

At the advent of COVID, Page resigned his full time academic position. He continues to publish in neurorehabilitation journals, as well as working as a scientific/medical writer, treating patients, and teaching neurorehabilitation continuing education courses to students and clinicians.

In recent years Page has become a sought-after session and performing bass guitarist.

== Awards and Honors ==
Dr. Page has received over 45 awards from rehabilitation and discipline-specific organizations, as well as specific universities and institutions. These include:

- Fellow, the American Congress of Rehabilitation Medicine
- Fellow, the American Occupational Therapy Association
- Fellow, the American Heart Association
- Fellow, the Research Consortium of the American Alliance for Health, recreation and Dance (now known as Shape America)
- Member, Academy of Research, American Occupational Therapy Foundation
- Inaugural Winner of the Early Career Award, American Congress of Rehabilitation Medicine
- President's Excellence Award, The University of Cincinnati
- Forty Under 40, The Cincinnati Business Courier
- Distinguished Member Award, the American Congress of Rehabilitation Medicine
- Outstanding Research Faculty, Ohio State University College of Medicine

== Selected publications ==
- Page, S. J., Levine, P., & Leonard, A. (2007). Mental practice in chronic stroke: results of a randomized, placebo-controlled trial. Stroke, 38(4), 1293–1297. (Cited 617 times)
- Page, S. J., Fulk, G. D., & Boyne, P. (2012). Clinically important differences for the upper-extremity Fugl-Meyer Scale in people with minimal to moderate impairment due to chronic stroke. Physical Therapy, 92(6), 791–798. (Cited 600 times)
- Page, S. J., Levine, P., Sisto, S., & Johnston, M. V. (2001). A randomized efficacy and feasibility study of imagery in acute stroke. Clinical Rehabilitation, 15(3), 233–240. (Cited 502 times)
- Page, S. J., Sisto, S., Levine, P., & McGrath, R. E. (2004). Efficacy of modified constraint-induced movement therapy in chronic stroke: a single-blinded randomized controlled trial. Archives of physical medicine and rehabilitation, 85(1), 14–18. (Cited 470 times)
- Page, Stephen J; Levine, Peter; Leonard, Anthony; Szaflarski, Jerzy P; Kissela, Brett M (2008-03-01). Modified Constraint-Induced Therapy in Chronic Stroke: Results of a Single-Blinded Randomized Controlled Trial. Physical Therapy. 88(3): 333–340 (Cited 265 times)
- Page, Stephen J.; Szaflarski, Jerzy P.; Eliassen, James C.; Pan, Hai; Cramer, Steven C. (May 2009). Cortical Plasticity Following Motor Skill Learning During Mental Practice in Stroke. Neurorehabilitation and Neural Repair. 23(4): 382–388 (Cited 261 times)
- Wilson, Richard D.; Page, Stephen J.; Delahanty, Michael; Knutson, Jayme S.; Gunzler, Douglas; Sheffler, Lynne; Chae, John (November 2016). Upper Limb Recovery after Stroke: A randomized, controlled trial comparing EMG-triggered, cyclic, and sensory electrical stimulation. Neurorehabilitation and Neural Repair. 30(10): 978–987 (Cited 85 times)
- Page, Stephen J.; Griffin, Christine; White, Susan (2020). Efficacy of Myoelectric Bracing in Moderately Impaired Stroke: A Randomized, Controlled Trial. Journal of Rehabilitation Medicine. 52(2) (Cited 13 times)
