= Affing =

- Municipality
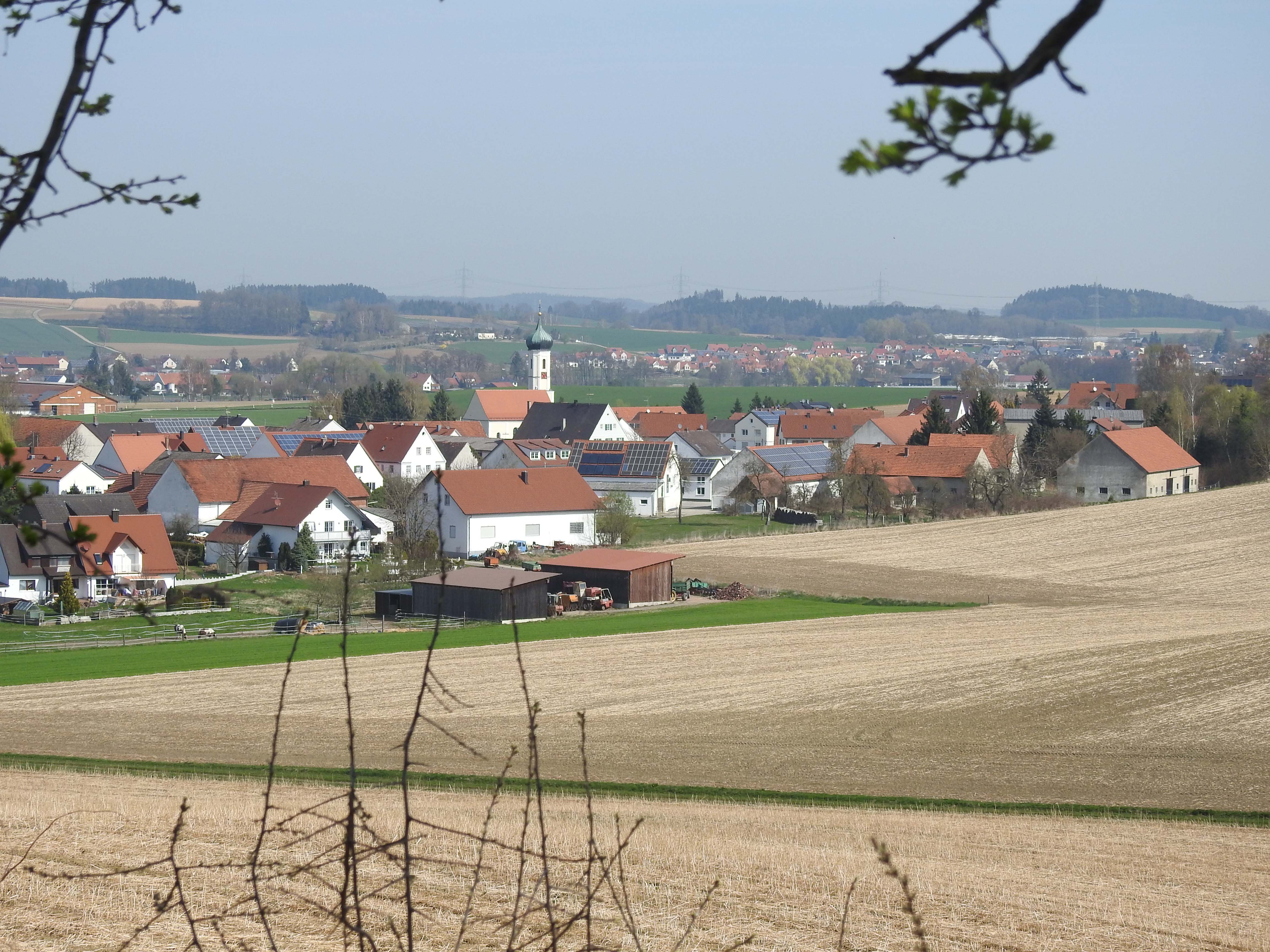
- Affing and Aulzhausen seen from southwest

- Coat of arms

- Location of Affing within Aichach-Friedberg district
- Interactive map of Affing
- Location within Germany Location within Bavaria
- Coordinates: 48°28′N 10°59′E
- Country: Germany
- State: Bavaria
- Admin. region: Schwaben
- District: Aichach-Friedberg

Government
  - Mayor (2020–26): Markus Winklhofer (CSU)

Area
  - Total: 44.86 km^{2} (17.32 sq mi)
- Elevation: 465 m (1,526 ft)

Population (2025-12-31)
  - Total: 5,586
  - Density: 124.5/km^{2} (322.5/sq mi)
- Time zone: UTC+01:00 (CET)
  - Summer (DST): UTC+02:00 (CEST)
- Postal codes: 86444
- Dialling codes: 08207
- Vehicle registration: AIC
- Website: www.affing.de

Affing is a municipality near (10 kilometres (6.2 mi)) Augsburg in Aichach-Friedberg district, in Swabia - Bavaria, southern Germany.

The municipality covers an area of 44.85 square kilometres (17.32 sq mi). Of the total population of 5,140, 2,591 are male, 2,248 are female, and 301 are of indeterminate status (Dec 31, 2003). The population density of the community is 115 inhabitants per square kilometre (300/sq mi).

Districts (villages) of the municipality Affing: Affing with Iglbach, Anwalting, Aulzhausen, Bergen, Frechholzhausen, Gebenhofen, Haunswies, Katzenthal, Miedering, Mühlhausen, Pfaffenzell.

In May 2015 a tornado devastated Affing, causing severe damage.

== Partner city ==
- Łobez (Poland), since 1997

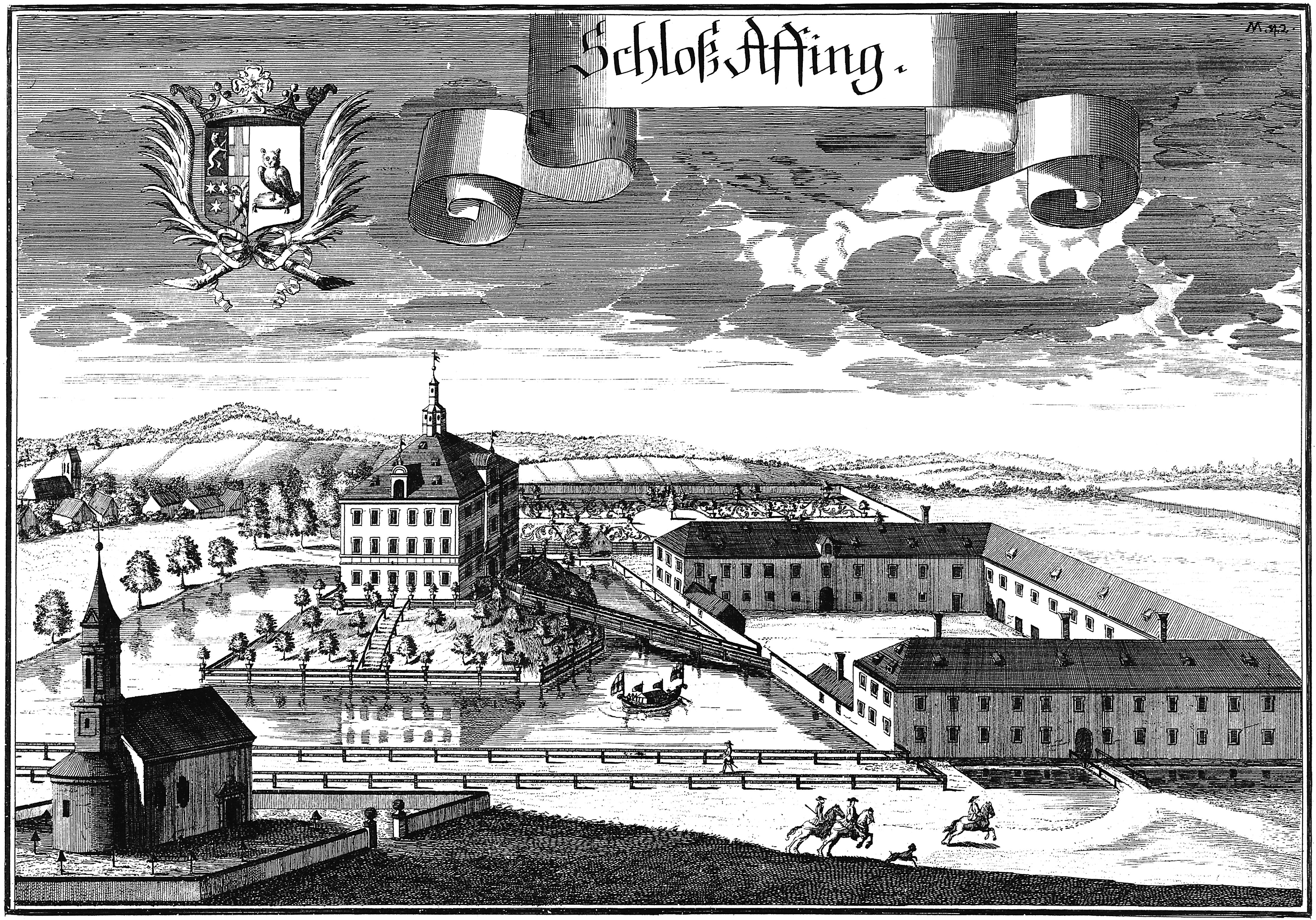
Schloss Affing c. 1700 - copper engraving by Michael Wening. Affing was formerly a hofmark and the schloss was its seat.
