= Ansitz Tütschenhof Tomasi =

Historical building in Tyrol

- Tütschenhof, Deutschmetz/Mezzocorona, Tyrol–South Tyrol–Trentino Euroregion, Europe
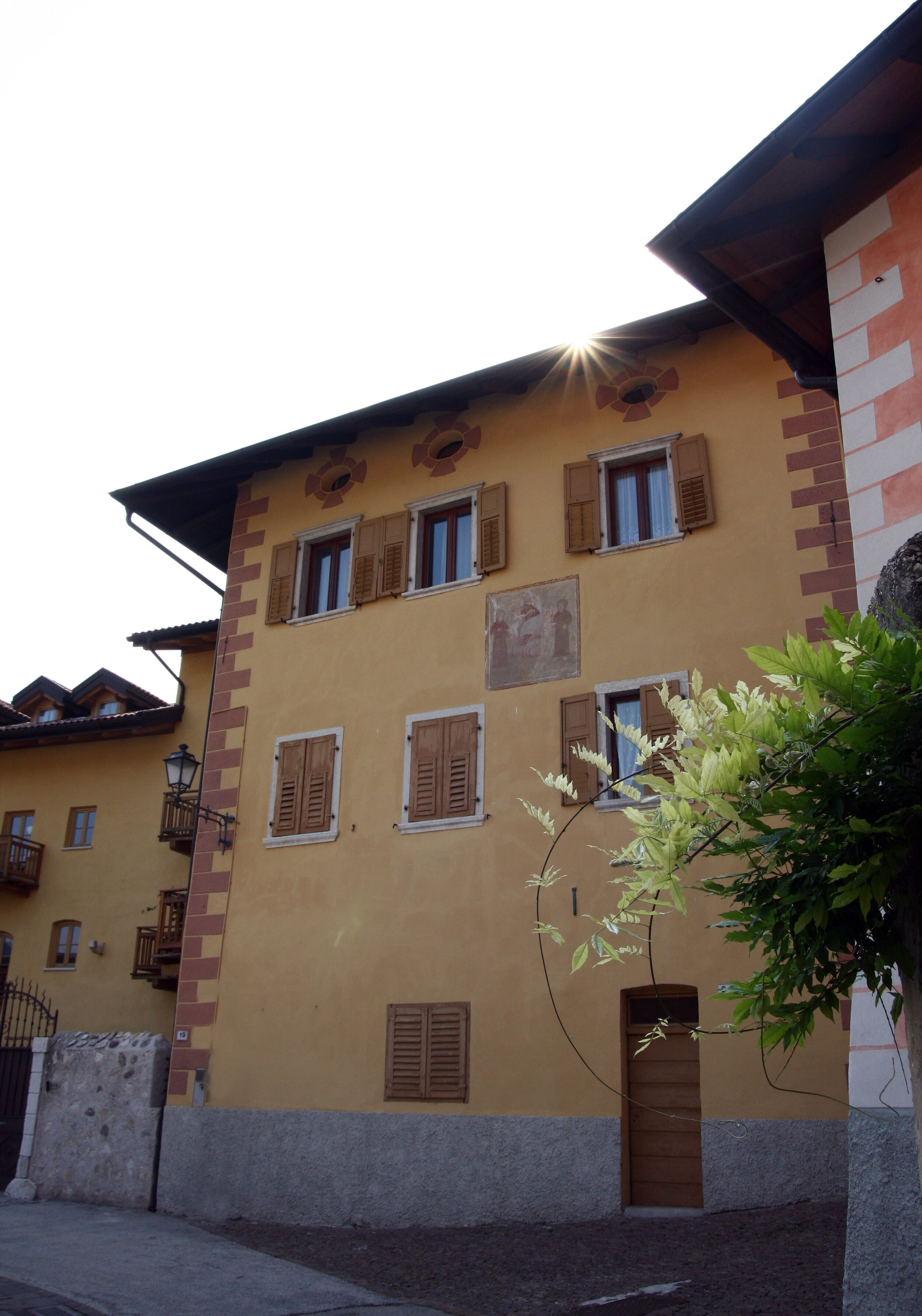

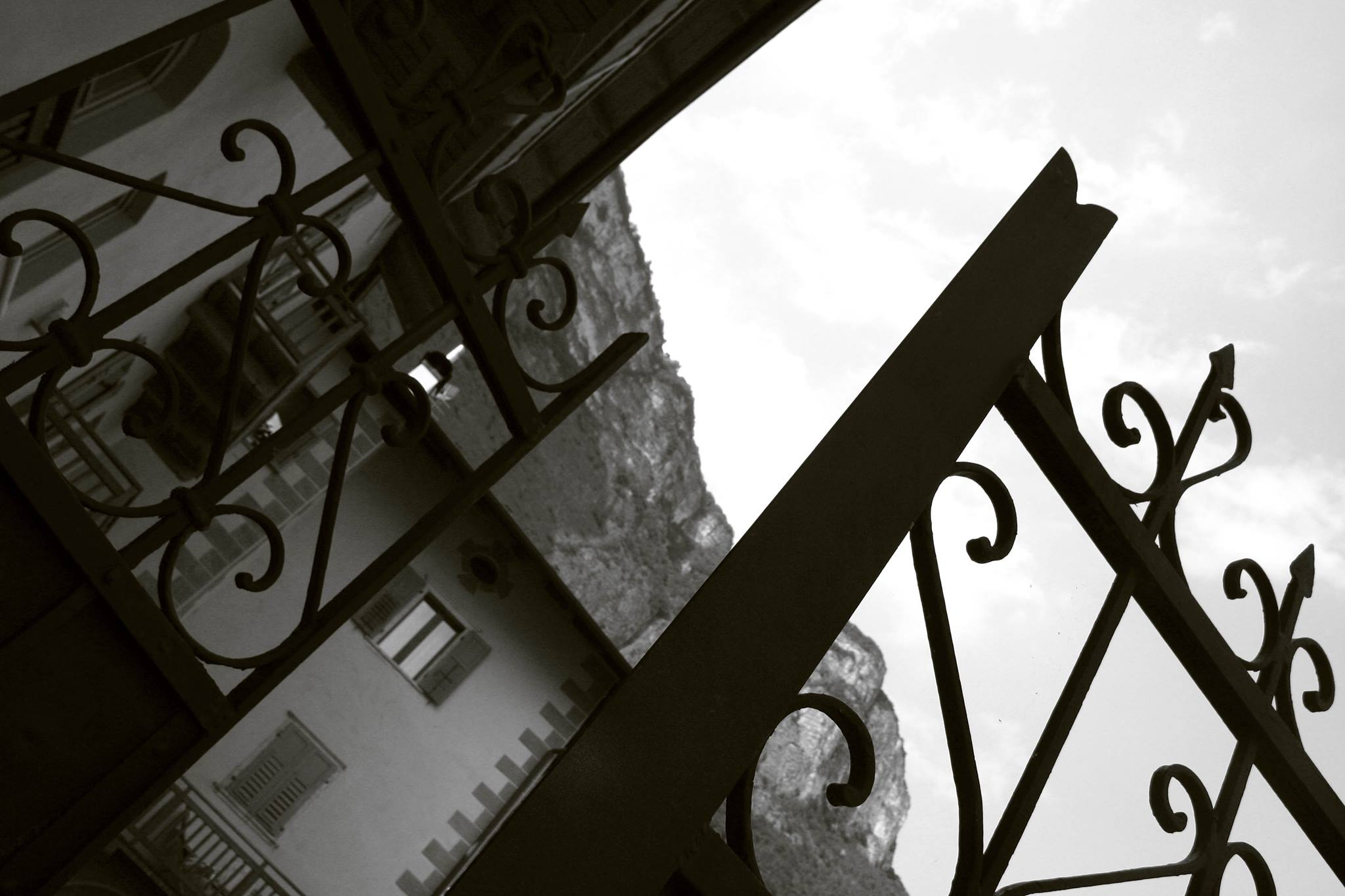

Location
- Coordinates: 46.2178245818237°N 11.119799039059238°E

The Ansitz Tütschenhof - Tomasi also known as Schloß Tütschenhof-Tomasi is a historical residence in the Tyrolean city of Mezzocorona / Deutschmetz, Italy.

== History ==
The first attested mention of the castle is found in the Austrian Federal Archive with the name "Titinhofen" (Sec. IX) ., and subsequently as "Twetschenhofen" (987) in the Tyrolean State Archives. The current name of the building itself is found in the “Dorfkaster Kronmetz” (1564).

From a linguistic perspective, the name "Tütschenhof" appears to be combination of Hof + Tütschen. While the definition is still debated by linguists, the two most plausible explanations are either the noun “Teutschen” (i.e., “belonging to the Germanic tribe” as in "Deutsch"), itself related to similar "Hofmark" in the Bavarian-Tyrolean areas (see Schloss Deutenhofen ) or the verb Oschternkockeletütschen, i.e., “Easter Egg tapping,” a common practice in religious traditions of the historical Tyrol to this day. As in many other examples of Alpine Ansitz, this castle is a type of residence of the Rural Nobility only found in the Alpine area, and unlike traditional castles, these residences were hardly fortified, and often originate from Roman or Pre-Roman buildings, and renovated during the Middle Ages or the Renaissance as they had lost their military purpose.

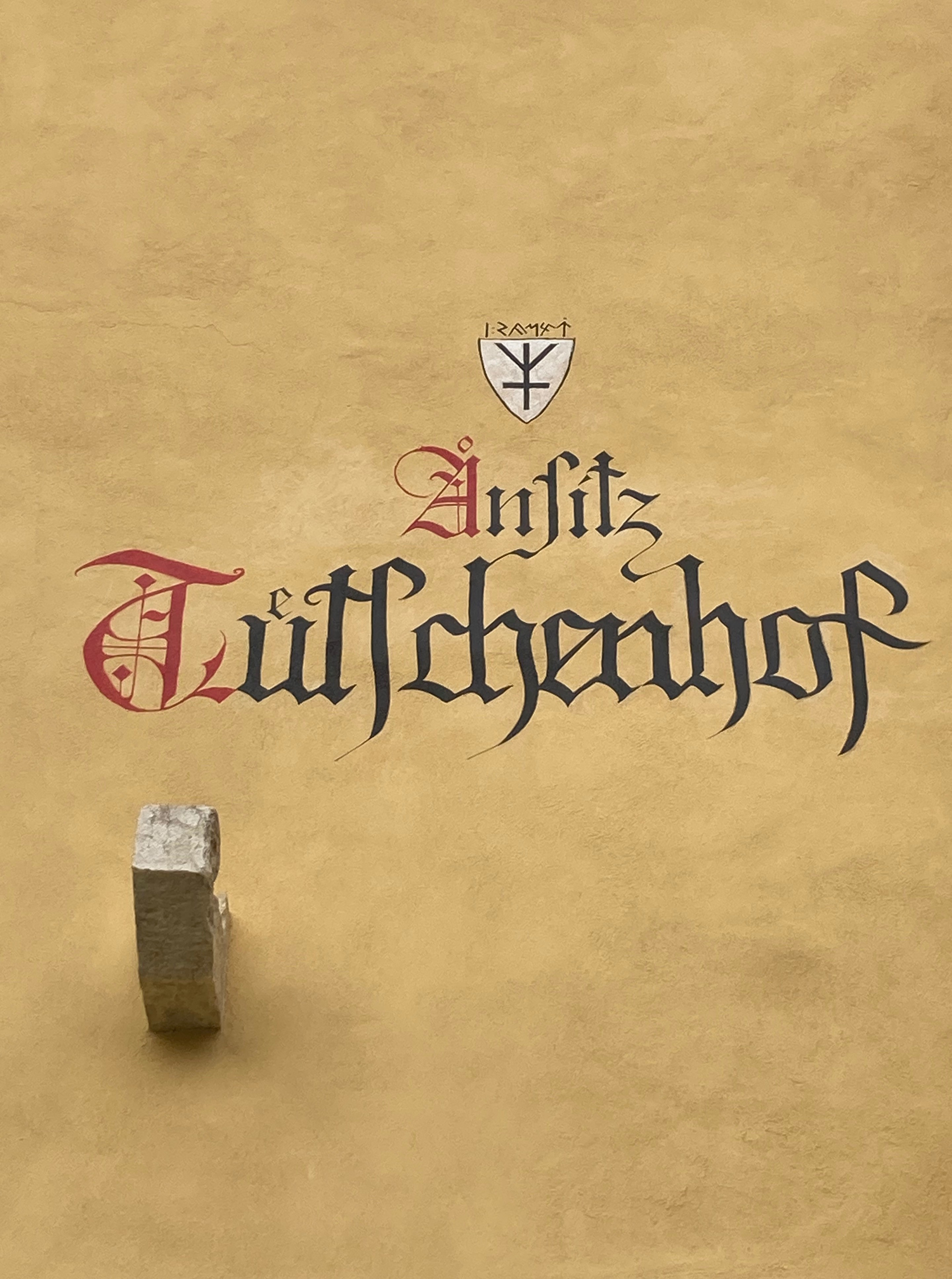
The "Hofmark" of the Castle with the description in gotica nova script

The residence still carries its historical name as well as its symbol (the Tütschenhof Hofmark), itself derived from the local Rhaetic alphabet of Bozen/San-Zeno, at times combined (in the frescoes of the Main “Saal”) with the Family crest of the Tyrolean branch of the family Tomasi which owns the building to this day, together with other palaces belonging to the late Giuseppe Tomasi di Lampedusa, such as the Palazzo Lanza Tomasi in Italy, the Stāmeriena Palace in Latvia, the Palazzo Butera, Palermo, and the Schloß Tomasi Feldenkirchen in Germany. As found in multiple Ansitz in the area, especially South Tyrol, this Hofmark is a term from the late Roman Empire /early Medieval law (the Baurecht or “Manorial Rights”) which allowed farmers who owned such an estate to be citizens of the Empire, and to inherit property and financial benefits and pass them on through generations, in the same way as the European nobility did, at least until the end of WWII.
