= Sandersdorf Castle =

German castle

- Schloss Sandersdorf
- Sandersdorf, Altmannstein, Bavaria, Germany
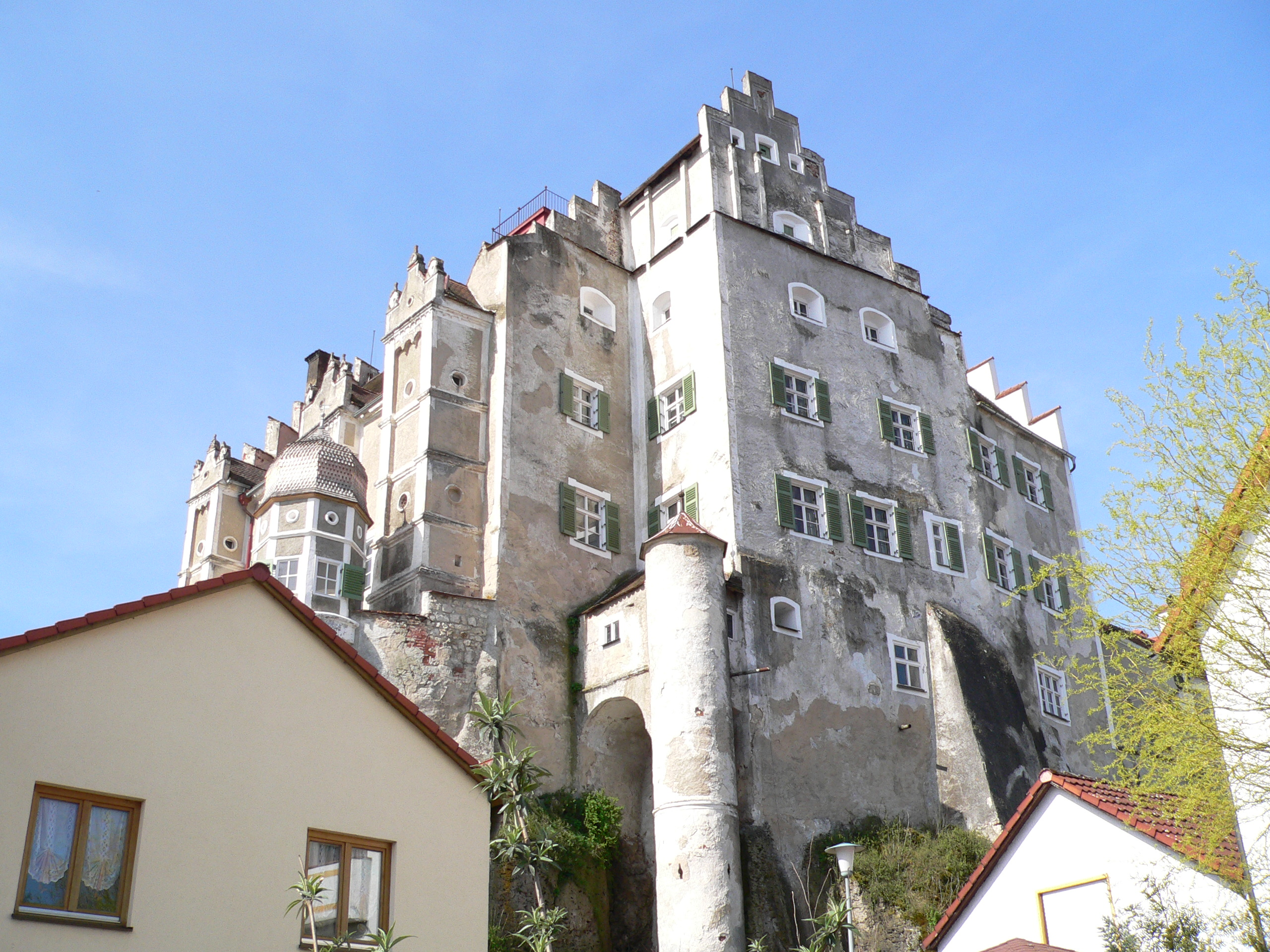
- Facade of the castle

Location
- Location in Bavaria Sandersdorf Castle (Germany)
- Coordinates: 48.901698°N 11.609096°E

Site history
- Built: 1646

Sandersdorf Castle (German: Schloss Sandersdorf) is a castle, or stately house, in the village of Sandersdorf in Altmannstein, to the northeast of Ingolstadt, Bavaria, Germany. The present building dates to 1646, and was restored in 1900.

== Building ==
The castle is a 17th-century building on a medieval foundation. It stands on a spur of high land to the west of the village of Sandersdorf. The building has four wings. The east and south wings are decorated with bay windows and gables. The lower west wing contains the inner courtyard with open arcades. There are onion domes over the gatehouse and the castle chapel. The most valuable works of art are a crucifix by Ignaz Günther and the Romanesque tympanum on the outside.

== History ==
A castle was built as the seat of the lords of Sandersdorf in the mid 12th century. The castle changed ownership several times in the 14th and 15th centuries. In 1420 it was burned by Duke Henry XVI of Bavaria-Landshut during his war with Duke Ludwig the Bearded of Bavaria-Ingolstadt. In 1425 Sandersdorf and its estate was awarded to the Muggenthal family. They held the castle for more than 200 years. The castle brewery was founded in 1550, and its Sandersdorf beer became widely known. The castle was destroyed during the Thirty Years' War (1618–1648), but the Muggenthals rebuilt it in its present form.

In 1646, soon after the reconstruction, Wolfgang Unverzagt Freiher von Roy purchased the property. He went bankrupt, and Johannes Jakob Lossius bought it in 1650. In 1675 it was inherited by his nephew Dominikus de Bassus, a professor at the University of Ingolstadt. During the War of the Spanish Succession (1701–1714) the building was devastated in 1703. Thomas Maria Baron de Bassus became a leader of the Illuminati in Italy, a secret society founded to promote enlightenment ideas such as opposition to superstition, prejudice, and abuse of state power. In 1787 the Bavarian police raided Sandersdorf castle and found compromising documents. His estate was temporarily confiscated. Baron de Bassus died in Sandersdorf in 1815.

Sandersdorf remained the property of the Barons de Bassus, and was partially restored in 1900 by the Munich architect Gabriel von Seidl. In 2008 the Wittelsbach Compensation Fund bought the castle and estate from the de Bassus family.

== Gallery ==
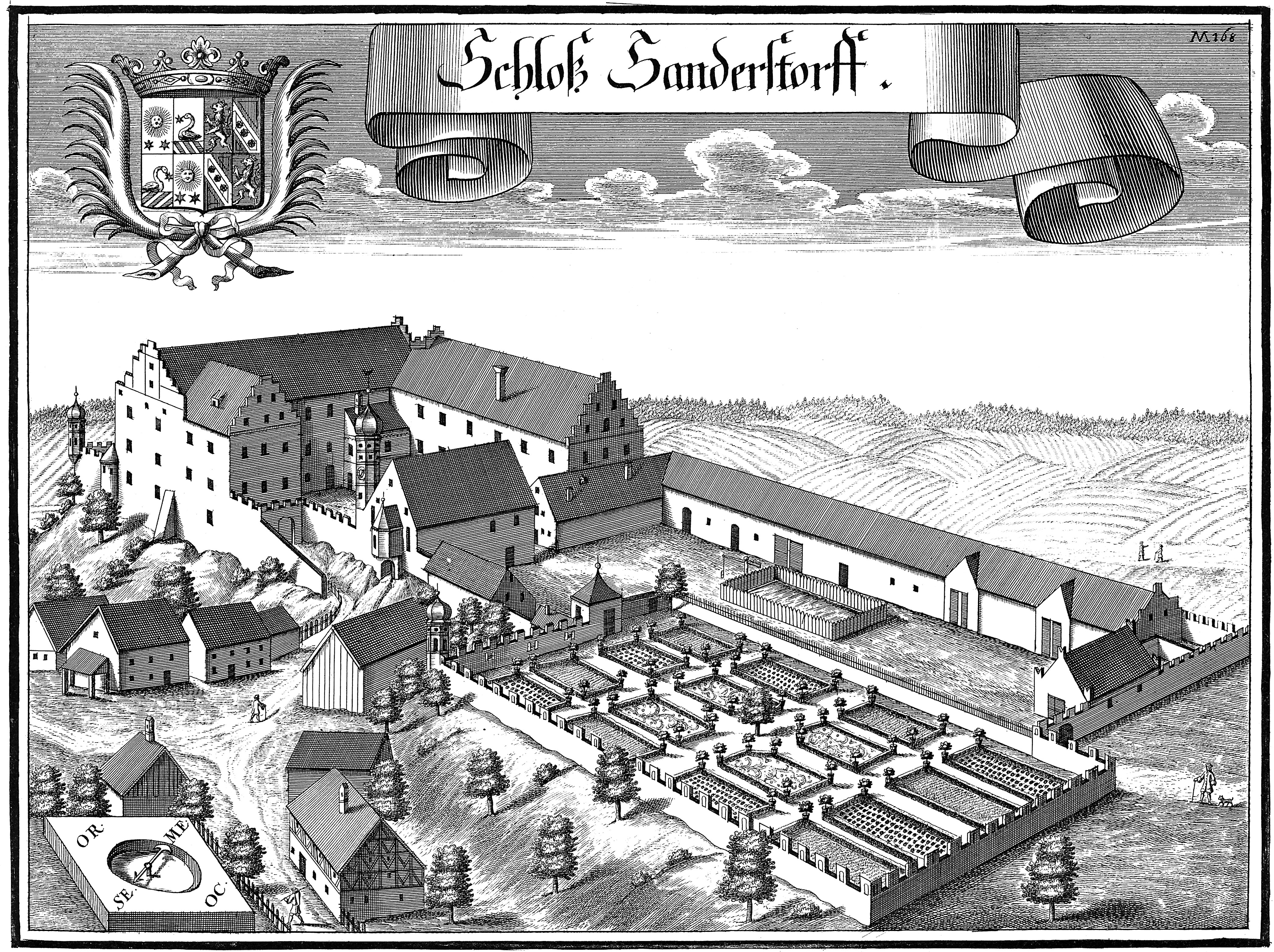
View of the castle c.1700 by Michael Wening

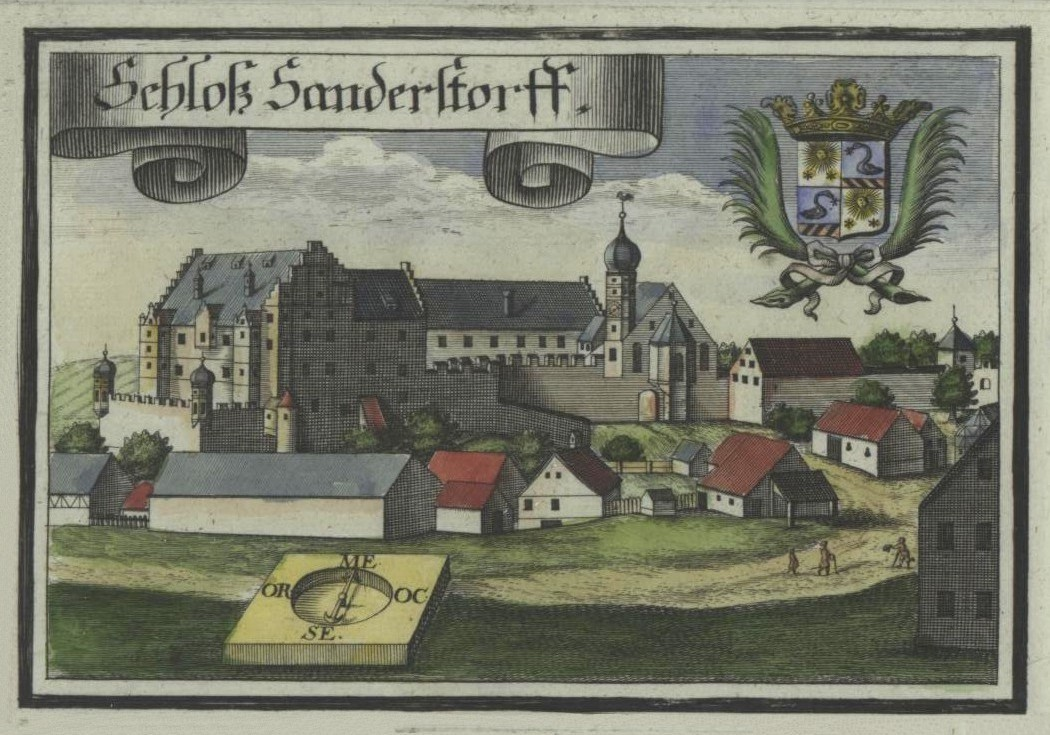
Another view of the castle c.1700 by Michael Wening

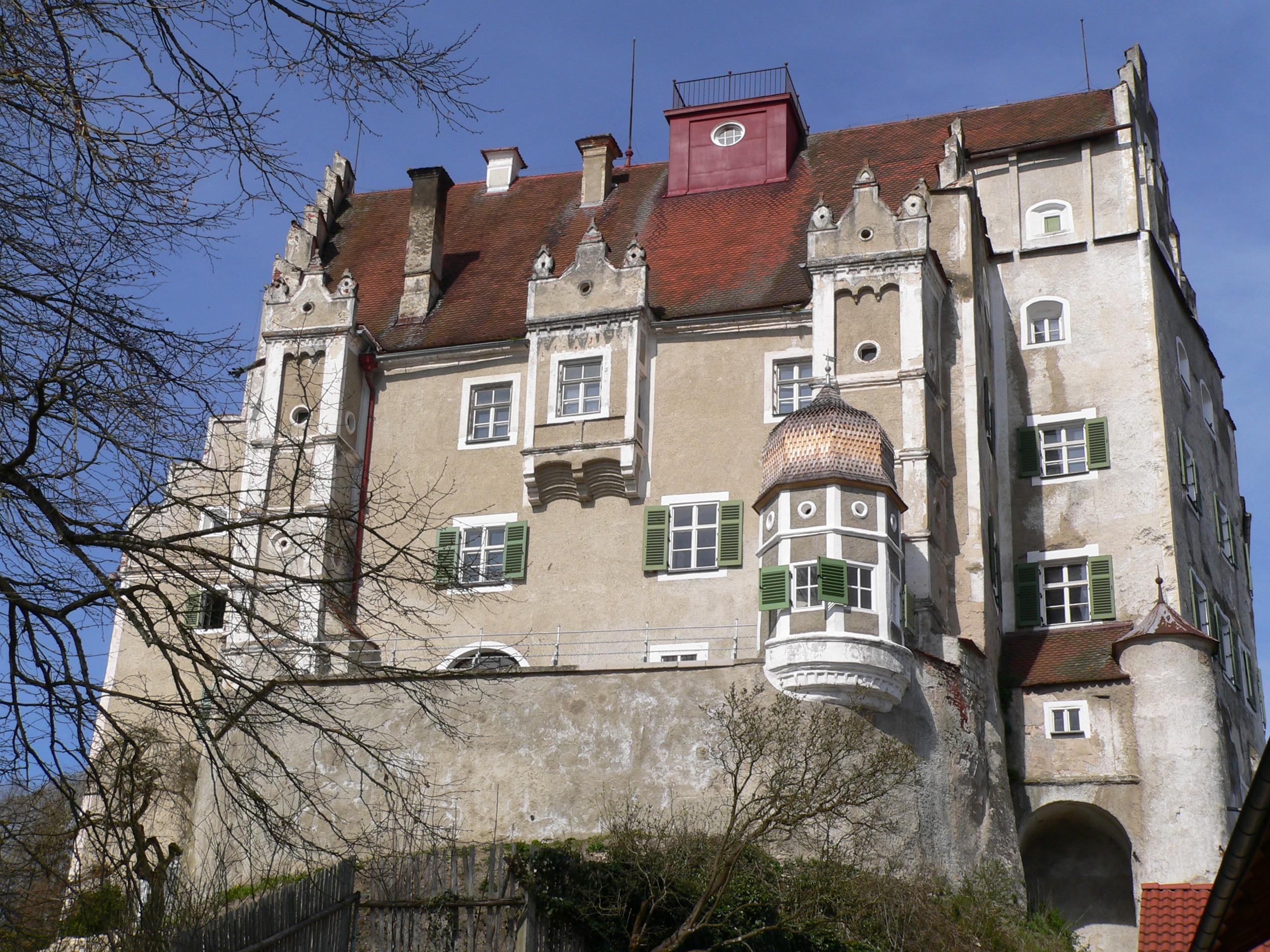
South side of the castle

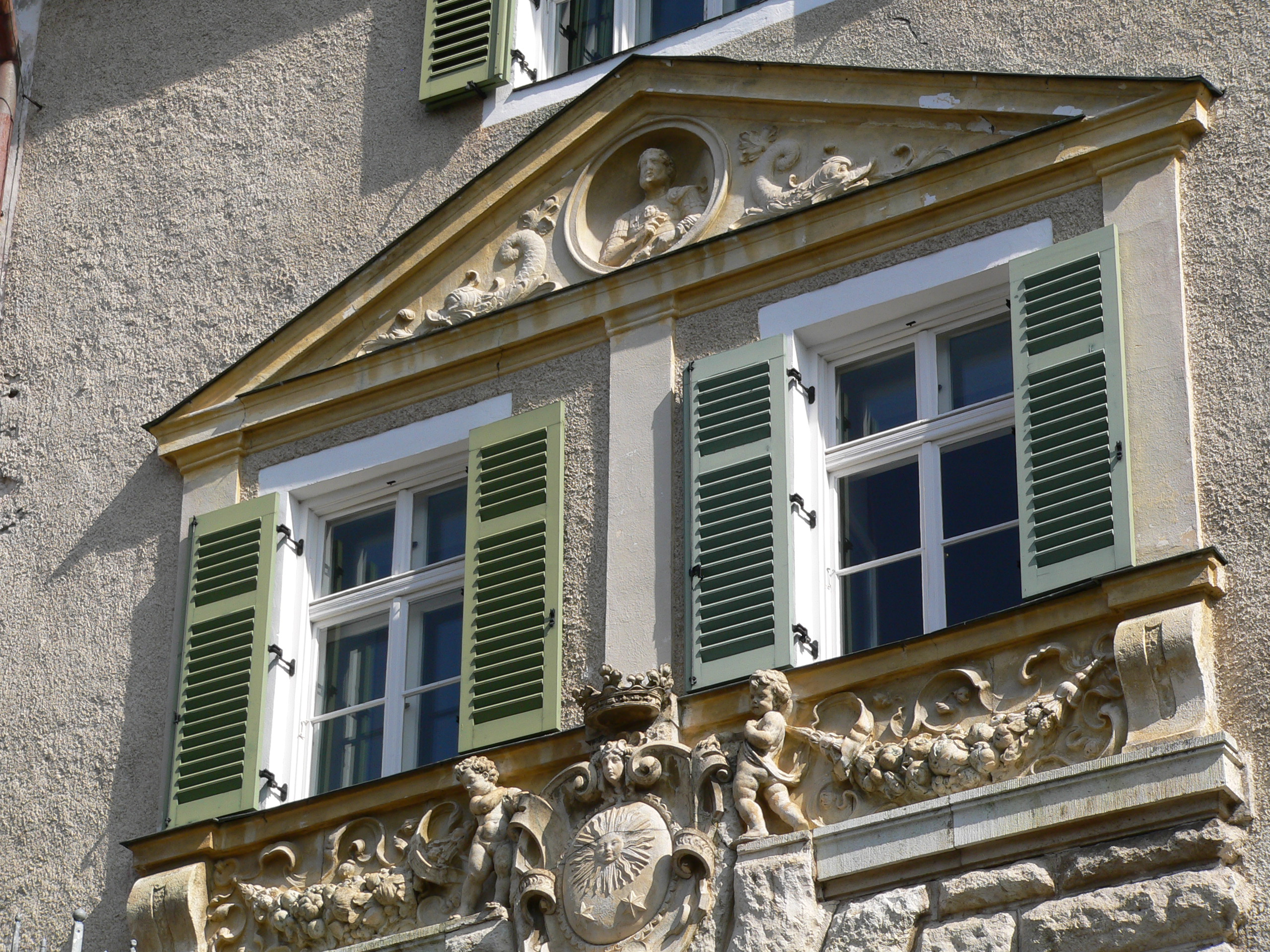
Rich ornamentation above the main portal
