= St. Lawrence and Elizabeth (Aulzhausen) =

Church in Aulzhausen, Germany

Coordinates: 48.445732°N 10.96546°E

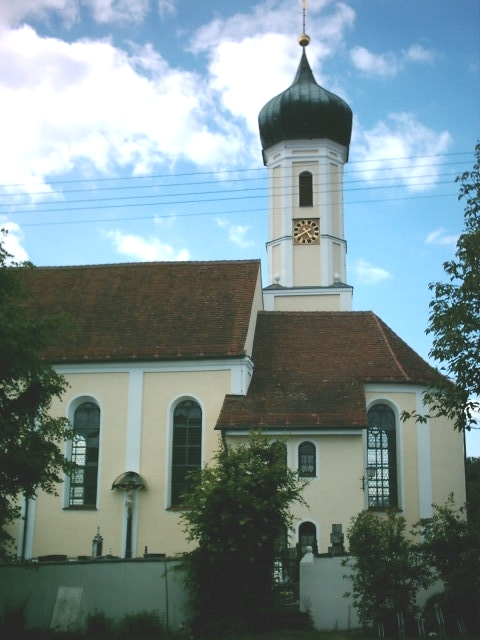
St. Lawrence and St. Elizabeth's church

St. Lawrence and Elizabeth is the Catholic parish church in Aulzhausen (Aichach-Friedberg, Bavaria, Germany). The church of Lawrence of Rome and Elizabeth of Hungary was erected in the 18th century and is a protected monument.

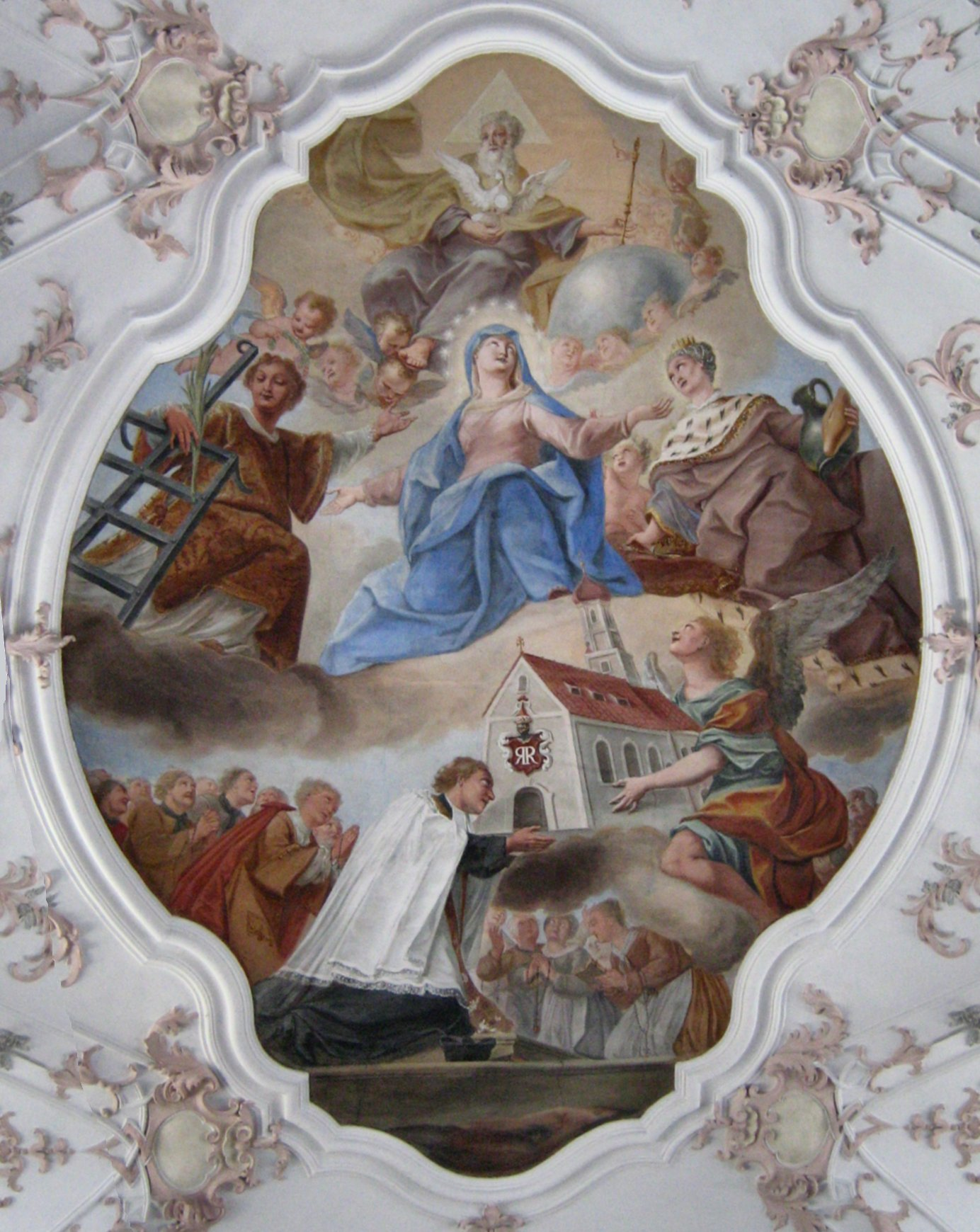
Choir fresco

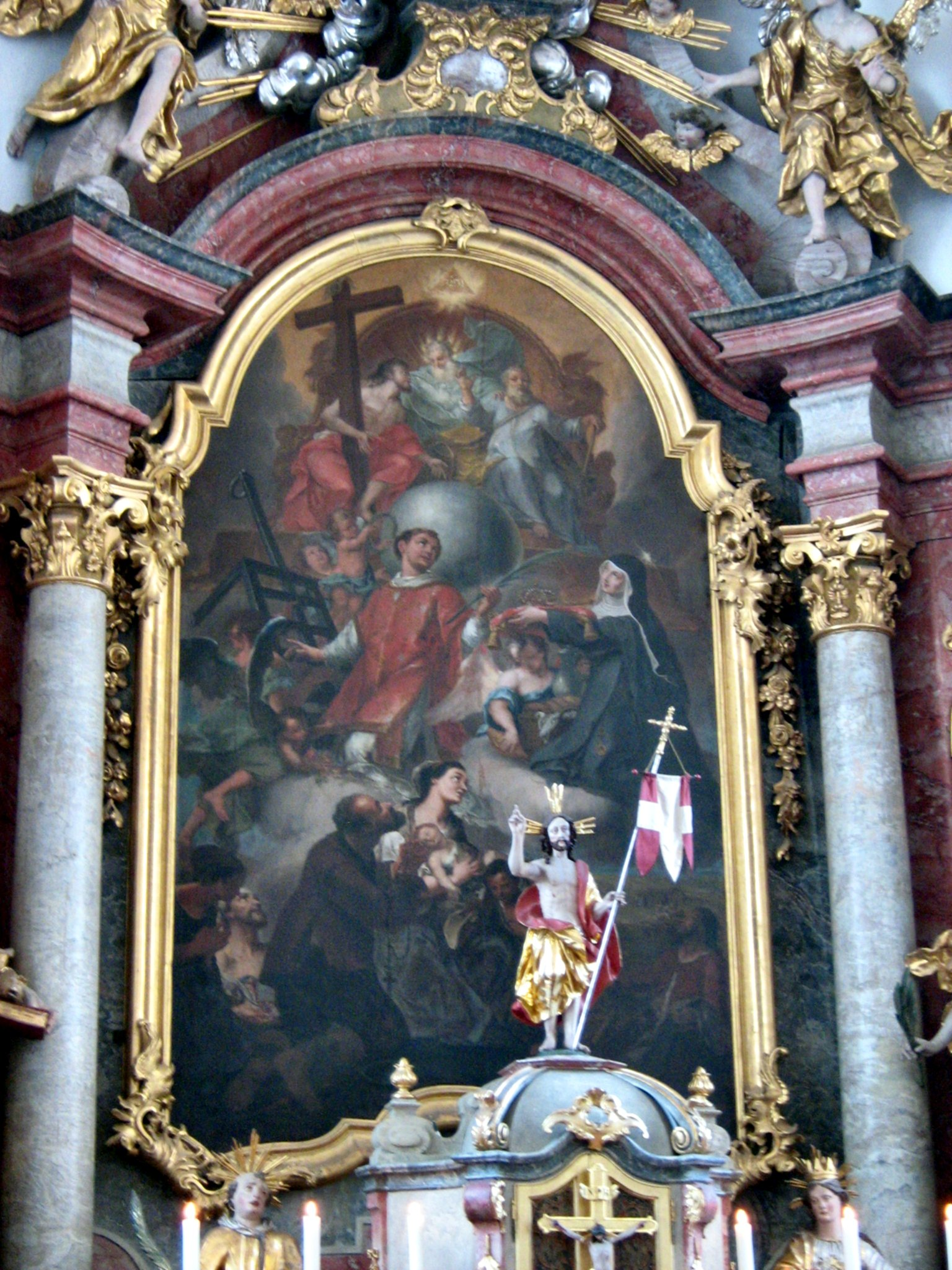
High altar

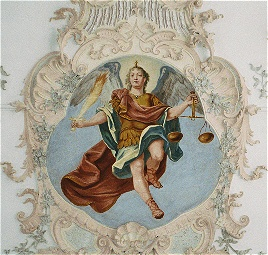
Fresco St. Michael (Scheffler)
