= Schloss Lauterbach, Bavaria =

Schloss Lauterbach
- Lauterbach, Bergkirchen, Bavaria, Germany
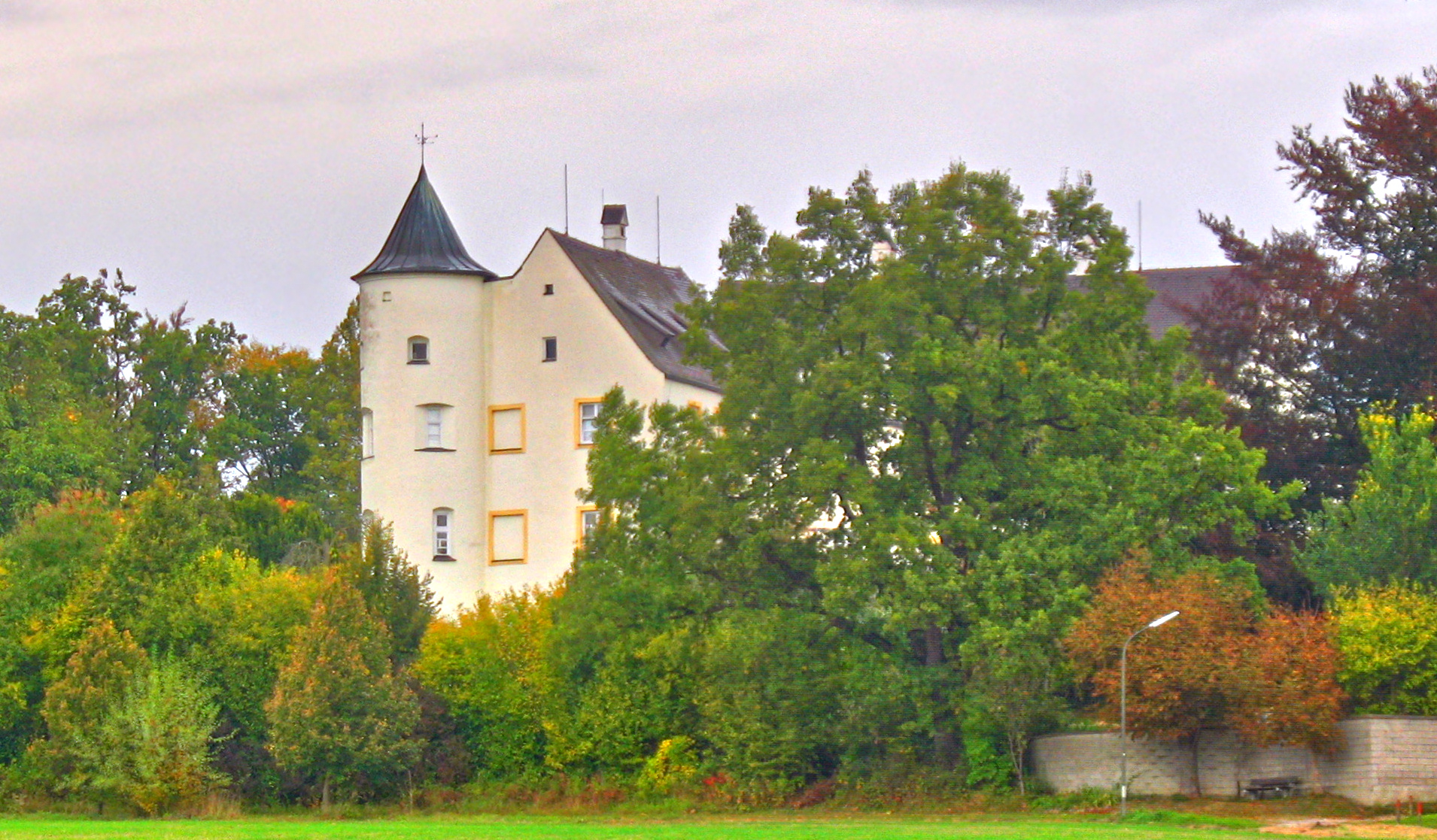
- View from the south

Location
- Location in Bavaria Schloss Lauterbach (Germany)
- Coordinates: 48.2662°N 11.3013°E

Schloss Lauterbach is a stately house in the village of Lauterbach, part of the municipality of Bergkirchen, Bavaria, Germany.

== Location ==
Schloss Lauterbach stands on a moraine hill in the east of the village of Lauterbach, about 10 kilometres (6.2 mi) west of the town of Dachau north of the autobahn between Augsburg and Munich. The main castle complex is surrounded by a moat to the south and west, almost always dry, which is scarcely visible due to the woods that have been allowed to grow.

== History ==
The Lauterbach estate was established by the first half of the 13th century. The Dachau family made Lauterbach their seat from around 1250 to 1437. The castle then passed through marriage to Veit von Eglofstein. He and his wife sold the castle in 1449, and there were various changes of ownership in the next hundred years. In 1550 Jörg or Georg Hundt zu Lauterbach und Valkenstein took possession and restored the castle. At this time it was a tall rectangular building surrounded by a thick ring wall, with defensive towers in the four corners. The castle was damaged during the Thirty Years' War (1618–1648). By the end of the war it had been burned down. In the second half of the 17th century Johann Franz Maximilian Servatius von Hundt undertook a major restoration, depicted in engravings by Michael Wening.

== Castle ==
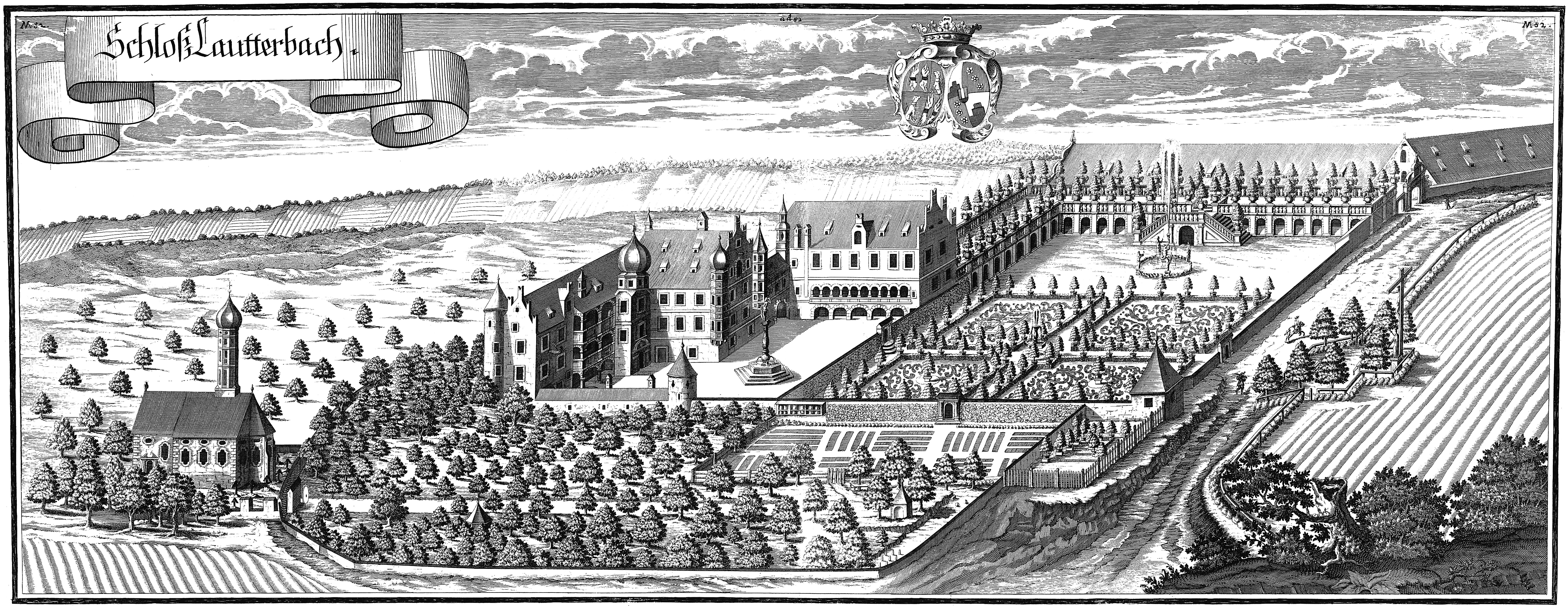
Panorama of the castle and surroundings by Michael Wening, c. 1700

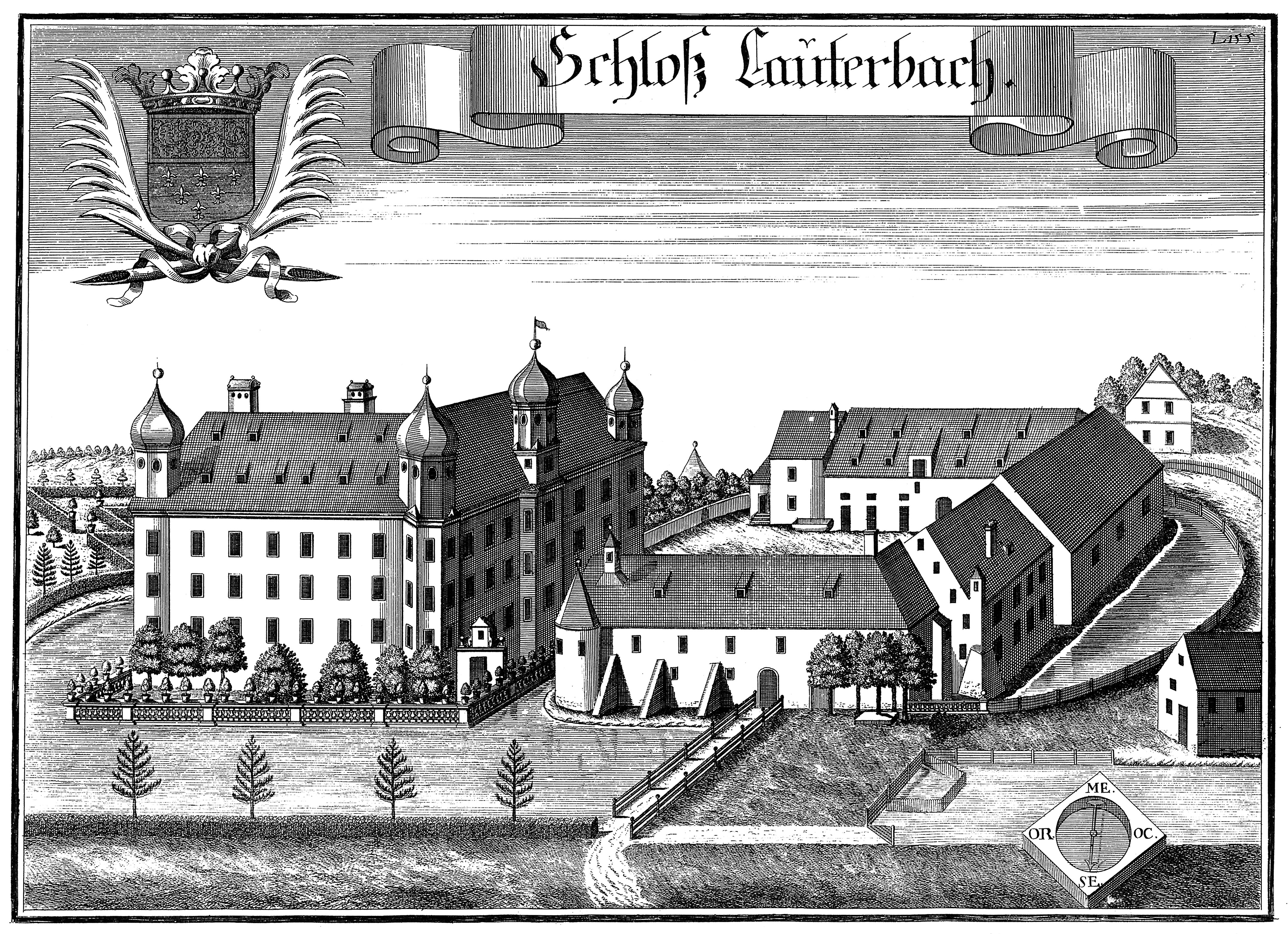
Another view of the castle by Michael Wening

The oldest depiction of Schloss Lauterbach is in a map by Philipp Apian from 1568. It is a rough drawing, but shows the remains of a fort with four corner towers. An engraving by Michael Wening from around 1700 shows the castle complex with a French parterre to the east of the castle. The earlier main structure is shown, with the addition of a chapel and a wing joining it to a three-story building that no longer exists. Another engraving by Wening, also published in the 1700 Historico Topographica Descriptio, shows the schloss from the northwest. The main building appears as two separate structures, and the chapel has a rounded apse. The two engravings may represent the building at a different stage of construction.

A further representation from 1729 shows the castle in essentially its present form, including a hexagonal fountain depicted by Wening. A view from around 1800 no longer shows the building to the north of the courtyard, and most of an elongated southern farm building show in earlier views is now gone. The fountain in the courtyard has also been removed. Later views show no significant changes.
