= Aulzhausen =

Aulzhausen
Aulzhausen is located in Germany
| Country: | Germany |
| State: | Bavaria |
| Admin.region: | Schwaben |
| District: | Aichach-Friedberg |
| Municipality: | Affing |
| Coordinates: | 48° 27′ N, 10° 58′ E |
| Elevation: | 475 m (1558 ft) |
| Population: | 460 (2008) |
| Postal code: | 86444 (old: 8901) |
| Area code: | 08207 |
| Licence plate code: | AIC (old: FDB) |

Aulzhausen is a village in the municipality of Affing near Augsburg (8 km) in the district of Aichach-Friedberg, in Swabia - Bavaria, southern Germany.

== Geographie ==
Aulzhausen is located on State Road 2035 (Augsburg - Neuburg). It is approximately six kilometers away from the A8 motorway Augsburg-East or Augsburg Airport and about eight kilometers away from Augsburg.

== Partnership ==
- Parish Aulzhausen and Parish Łobez (Poland), since 1994

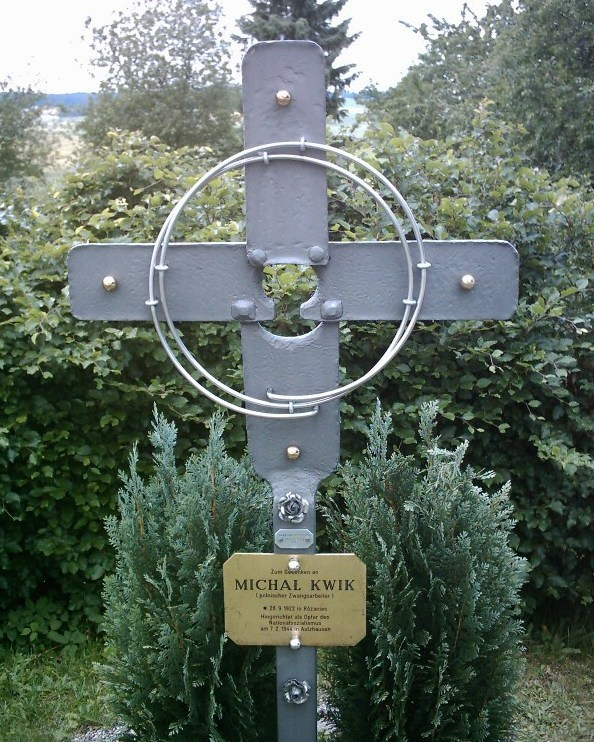
German-Polish reconciliation 1994

== Cemetery monument ==
The St. Laurence and Elizabeth Catholic Cemetery monument inscribed "Bete für die Verstorbenen und wirke für den Frieden" Translation: "Pray for the dead and act for peace." Another marker there says, "Den Gefallenen zum Gedenken" ("In order to remember the fallen") Chart showing that "11 fell 1914-18, 36 fell 1939-45, 6 missing 1939-45."

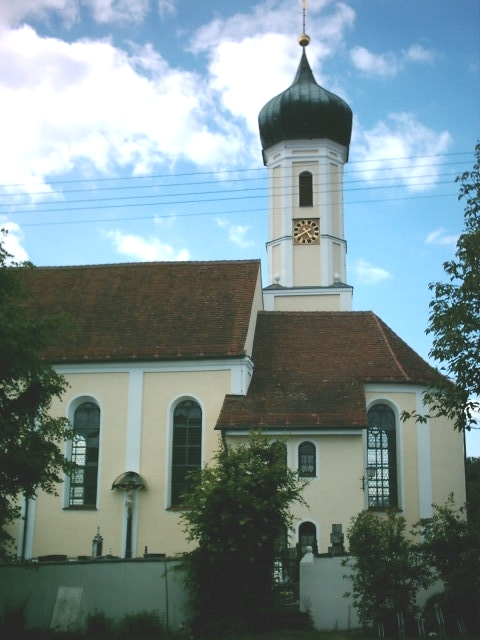
St. Lawrence and Elizabeth
