= Affing House =

Building in Affing, Swabia, Germany

- Schloss Affing
- Affing, Bavaria, Germany
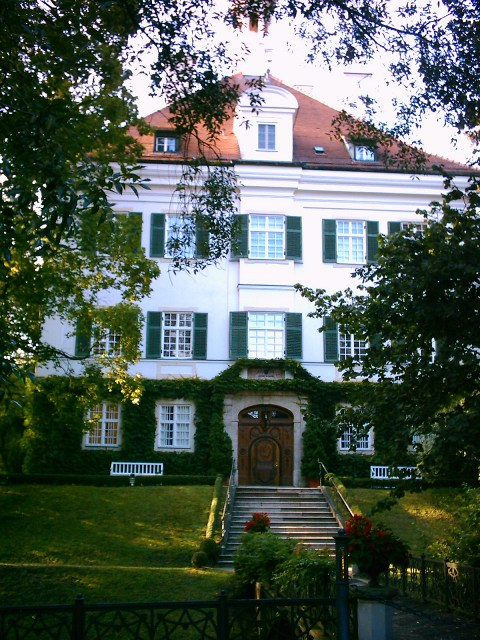
- Facade of the castle

Location
- Location in Bavaria
- Coordinates: 48.459424°N 10.982513°E

Site history
- Built: 14th century

Affing House (German: Schloss Affing) is a stately home in Affing, Bavaria, Germany that has its origins in an early moated castle. It was the seat of a hofmark, a Bavarian feudal estate. After the old castle was destroyed, the schloss was built in 1682. It was burned down in 1927, but was rebuilt following the original design as closely as possible.

== Building ==
The schloss stands on an artificial hill. It is reached by a small bridge over the moat, which is now dry. There are fifteen steps leading up to the grand entrance. The richly-ornamented wooden door was made in the early 19th century and survived a fire in 1929. Above it the family emblem of the Barons of Gravenreuth, a unicorn, is at the left and the Bavarian lion is at the right. The building is almost square, with three stories and a tent roof.

== Grounds ==
The castle lies on the southwestern edge of a large landscaped area with a stream, pond, picturesque bridges and boat house. An Orangery built in 1830 with old Bohemian etched glass panels was used to preserve delicate plants in the winter. There is a grotto among the trees built in the 19th century by the Countess of Boullion, great-grandmother of present Baron, dedicated to Our Lady of Lourdes. A small pavilion was brought from the Paris Exhibition of 1900, from where visitors can look over the great lawn.

Outbuildings to the south were once used for carpentry, brewery, blacksmith and gardening. They have survived and are being renovated for new uses. The Orangerie was built in 1807 and expanded into its present form in 1871. It was later allowed to deteriorate. One wing collapsed and the roof of the Palm house was in precarious condition. Recently plans were made to renovate the building to contain a swimming pool, changing rooms and sauna, and two guest apartments.

== History ==
The house was built on the site of a former moated castle, first mentioned in 1408. The two-story castle was built by Wolfgang von Waldeck. A woodcut by Philipp Apian from 1568 gives some idea of the original shape. It had a stepped gable roof and was surrounded by a moat. This early castle was destroyed in the Thirty Years' War (1618–1648). In 1682 Johann Baptist Freiherr von Leyden built a schloss on the same site, which is depicted in an engraving by Michael Wening from around 1700. The castle had a chapel and various outbuildings around three sides of a square to the south.

Karl Ernst Graf von Gravenreuth came to live in the schloss. He was from a Frankish noble family that had emigrated to France. He was a friend of Napoleon, with whom he had studied at the French Military Academy. He emigrated to Bavaria when the French Revolution broke out. He became a minister of the Bavarian state, and was involved in arranging the secret Treaty of 1805 in which Maximilian I Joseph became king of Bavaria. The Emperor Napoleon (1769–1821) often visited the schloss. Hortense de Beauharnais (1783–1837), stepdaughter of Napoleon and queen-consort of Holland, was also a frequent visitor. She is said to have donated the cast iron railings of the entrance bridge.

In 1816 the Graf von Gravenreuth used money that Napoleon had given him in compensation for his lost properties in France to purchase the Affing hofmark. The castle had been poorly maintained by the previous owner, who was struggling financially. Gravenreuth renovated the building, expanded the brewery and built a brick factory and a nursery to bring in revenue. His wife redesigned the landscape garden in the informal English style.

There were no significant structural changes until 16 October 1927, when the castle was destroyed by a major fire, probably due to a faulty fireplace. Six firemen died fighting the blaze, but their hand pumps could not reach the top floor. Some antique furniture was rescued but many valuable objects were lost. The owner determined to rebuild the house exactly as it looked in 1694. The present castle is thus a reconstruction.

== Gallery ==
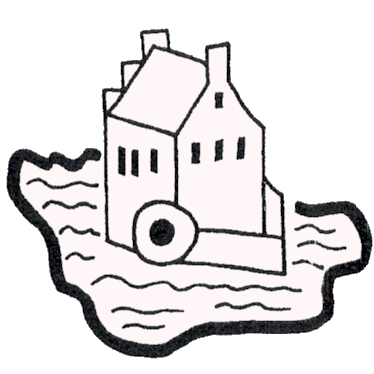
Aeffing Castle, woodcut by Philipp Apian (1568)

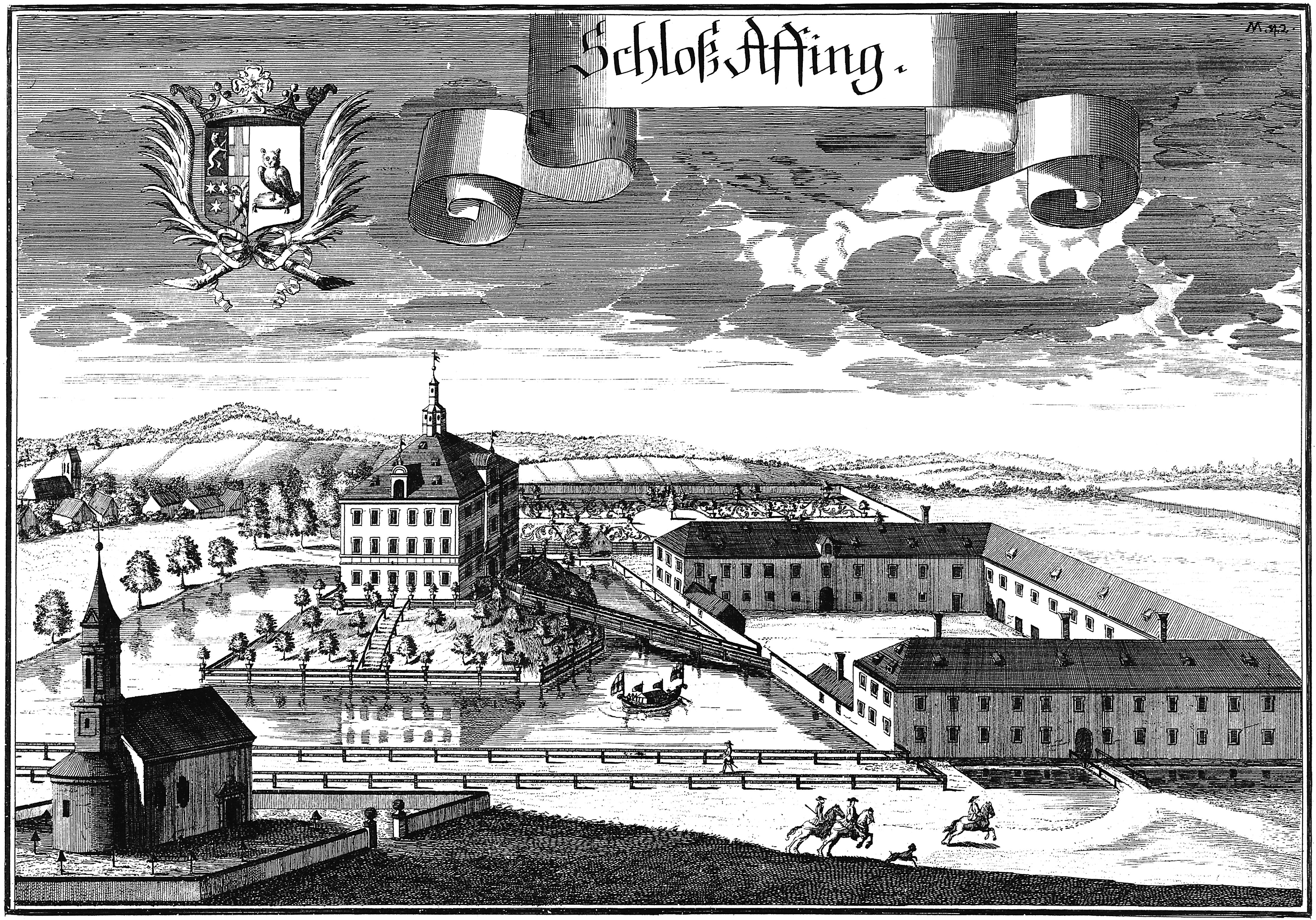
Schloss Affing c. 1700 - copper engraving by Michael Wening

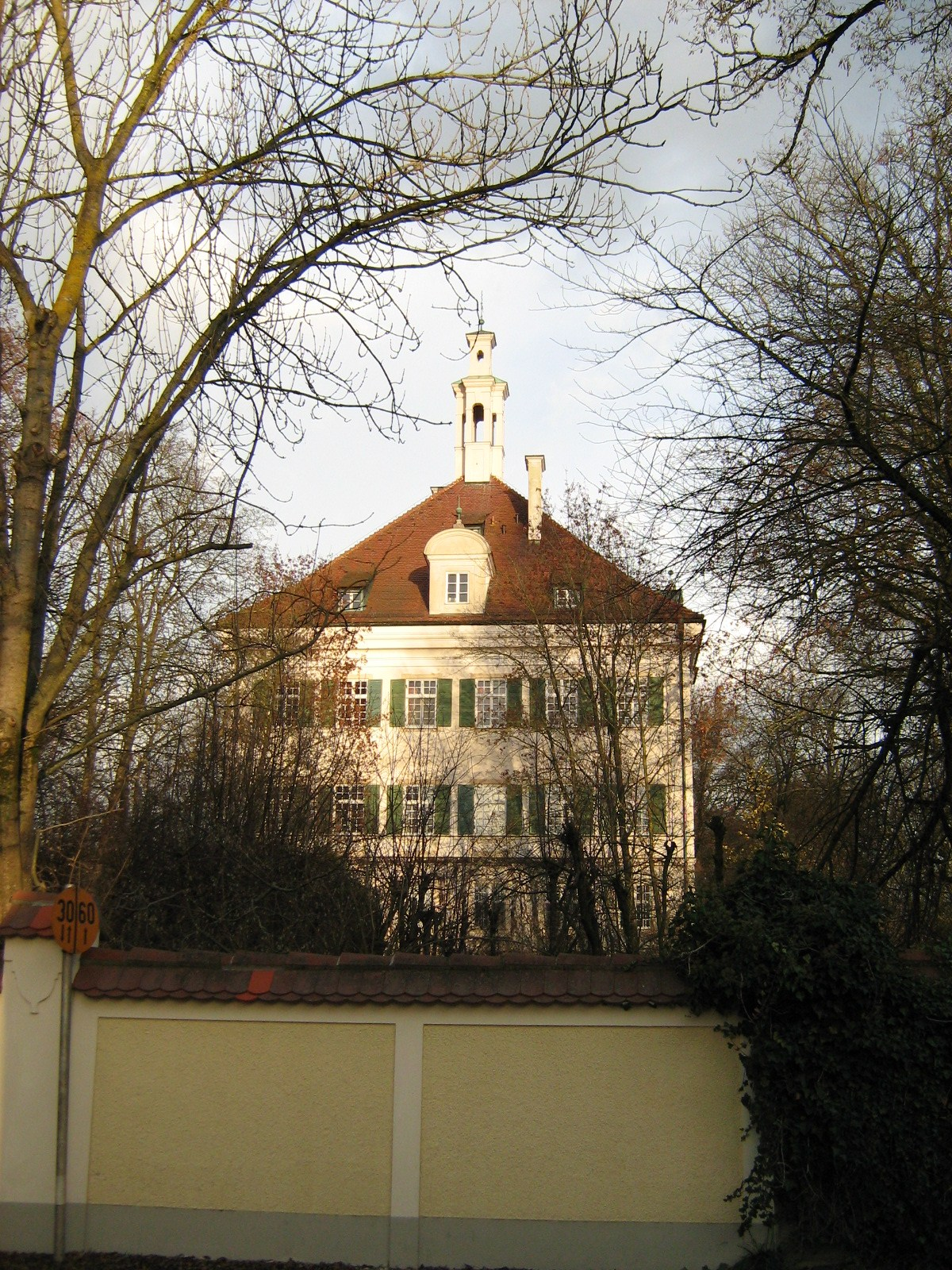
November 2007

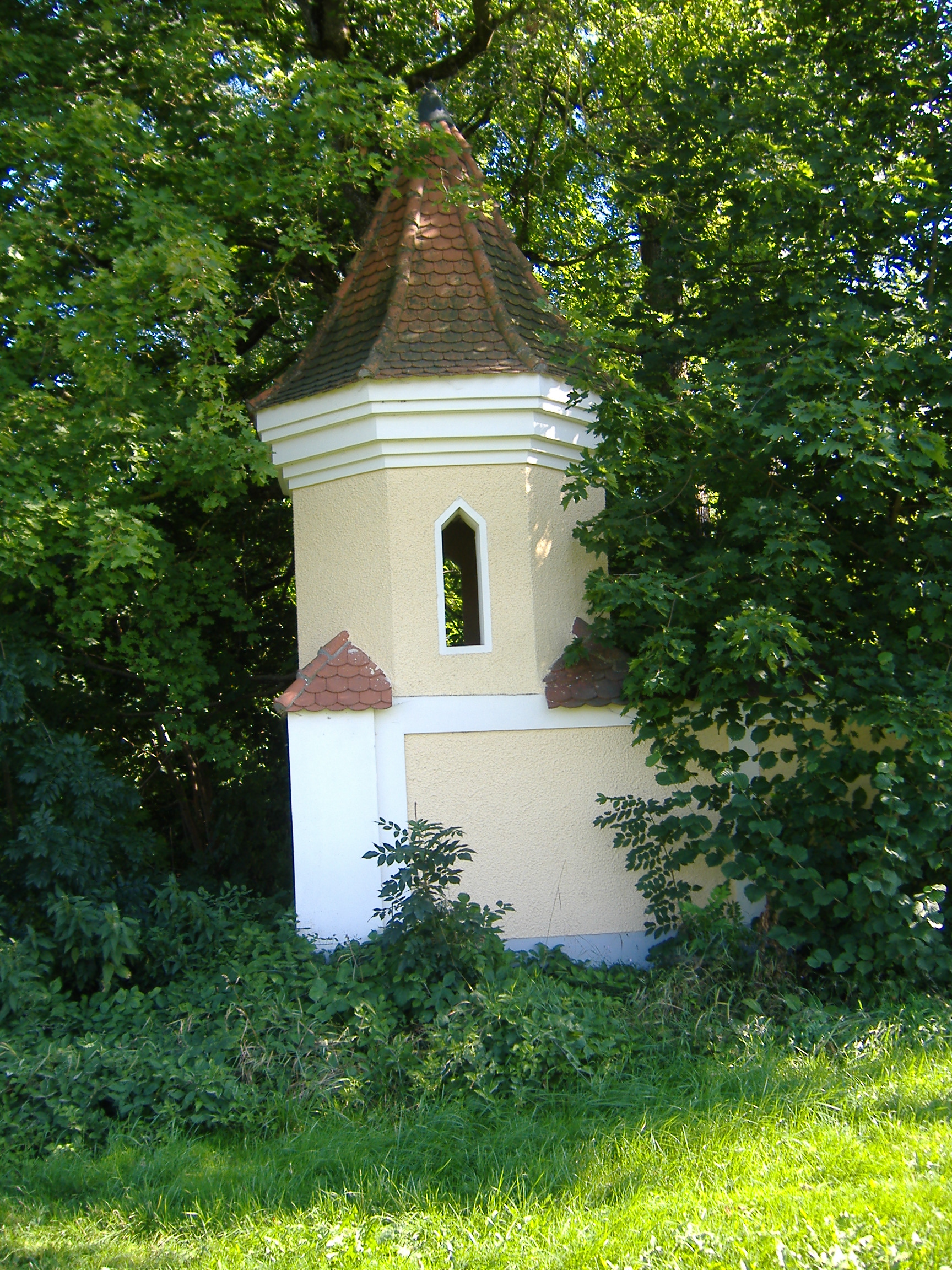
Castle wall
