= Michael Wening =

Bavarian engraver (1645–1718)

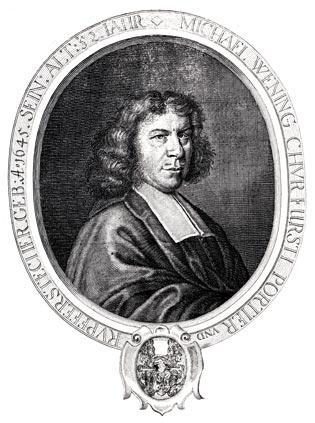
- Born: 11 July 1645; Nuremberg, Bavaria
- Died: 18 April 1718 (aged 72)
- Occupation: Engraver
- Known for: Scenes of Bavaria

Michael Wening (11 July 1645 – 18 April 1718) was a Bavarian engraver who is known for his many depictions of important places in the Bavaria of his day, including cityscapes and views of stately homes, castles and monasteries. The work has great historical value.

== Early years ==
Michael Wening was born on 11 July 1645 in Nuremberg, Bavaria, son of Balthasar and Katharina Wening. His parents had 13 children, of whom he was the only survivor. His father was a pork butcher and meat inspector. Michael did not follow his father's trade, but became an engraver. In the 1660s he was working for the Nuremberg publishing houses of Fürst and Hoffmann, where he learned to draw cityscapes.

Wening left Nuremberg in the spring of 1668, and is first mentioned in Munich in December 1669, where he applied for work at the court as an engraver. At this time he converted from the Protestant to the Catholic church, perhaps because it was very hard for non-Catholics to find work in Munich. He married Anna Maria Mörl on 27 January 1671, and was given a permanent residence permit for Munich. In 1672 Wening was working part-time at the court as a quartermaster, arranging receptions and travel, and increasingly being called an engraver in court orders. By 1675 he was being called "court engraver".

== Court engraver ==
In the years that followed Wening undertook small commissions for a number of clients. He founded a publishing company in the late 1670s and for ten years issued an illustrated calendar. In 1680 Wening made a copper engraving of the fireworks display for the 18th birthday of Max Emanuel, the Elector of Bavaria. He now began to receive regular orders, particularly for engravings to illustrate the Elector's war victories. He made numerous scenes of battles in the wars against the Ottoman Empire, which was trying to expand into Europe. These have considerable historical value.

In January 1696 Wening began work on a four-volume Landesbeschreibung (Description of the State) that would depict all the important places in the Electorate of Bavaria. The work would include pictures and a description written by the Jesuit priest Ferdinand Schönwetter. The first volume covering the Munich district was published on 2 November 1701, with 358 engravings. The work proved much harder than expected, and financial contributions did not cover costs. During the War of the Spanish Succession (1701–1714) Bavaria was occupied by the Austrians, a disaster for Wening as court engraver of the exiled Wittelsbachs, while the general economic difficulties meant that Wening got few private commissions. Despite this, Wening continued to undertake his most significant work at his own cost. In his last years he lived in extreme poverty. He died on 18 April 1718.

== Legacy ==
Wening's heirs published the last three volumes of the "Landesbeschreibung". The Burghausen district with 117 engravings was published in 1721. The Landshut district with 245 engravings appeared in 1723 and the Straubing district with 129 engravings appeared in 1726. The work was published as the Historico-Topographica Descriptio, with a total of 846 engravings of views of cities, towns, monasteries, palaces, castles and manor houses. It is probably the most comprehensive description of a European country before the modern age. Under his contract with the court, the copper plates are owned by the State of Bavaria, and are held by the Bavarian State Office for Survey and Geoinformation in Munich.

Werning's engravings provide a record of buildings that have long disappeared, as well as interesting depictions of town life at the time. Although he sometimes presented an idealized view of the conditions of the buildings, Wening's pictures were generally very accurate and have great value for the historian of art and architecture. His views of the Bavarian monasteries accurately depict the baroque renovations that had recently been undertaken.

== Sample illustrations from the Historico-Topographica Descriptio ==
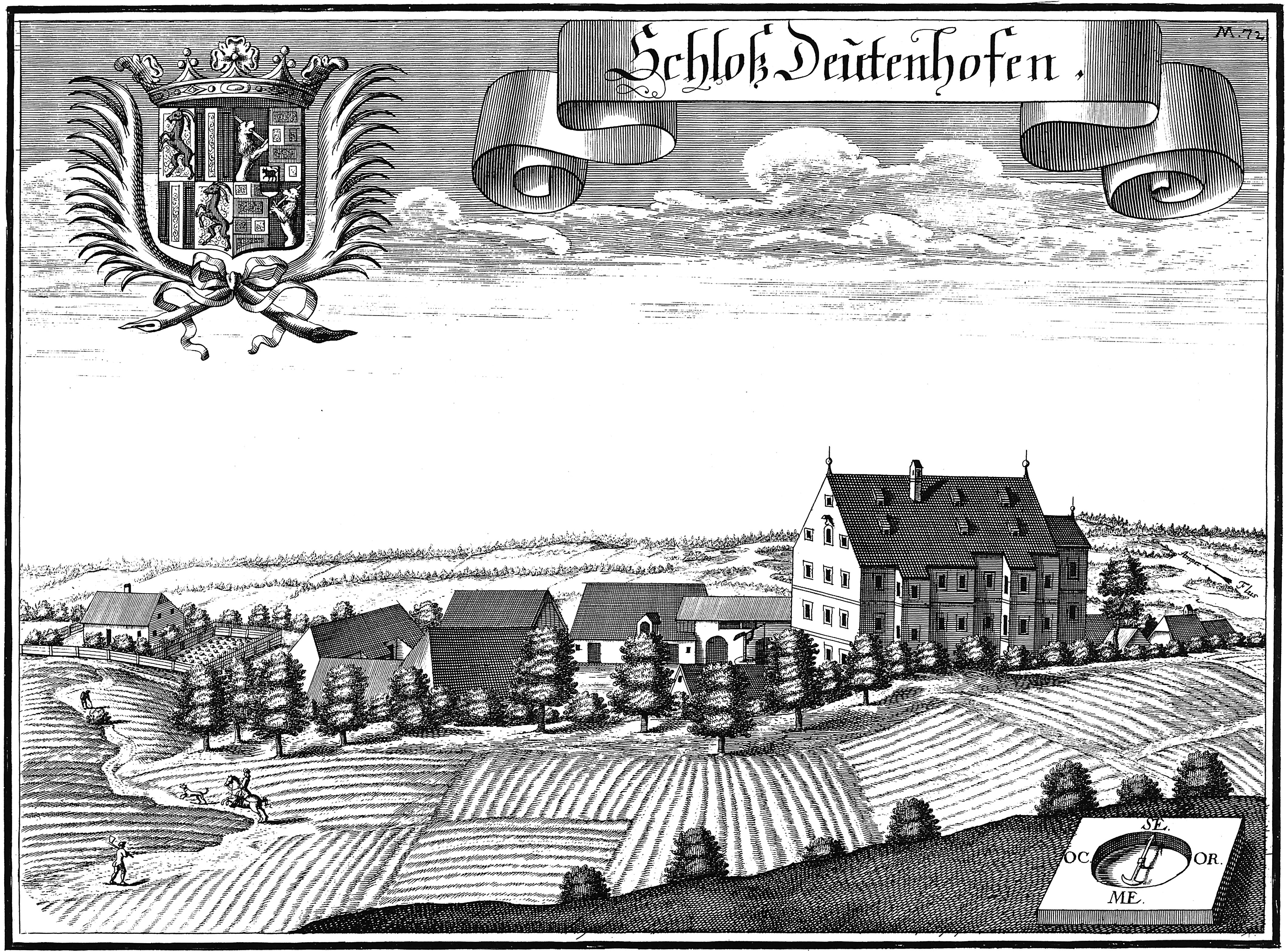
Schloss Deutenhofen in 1700

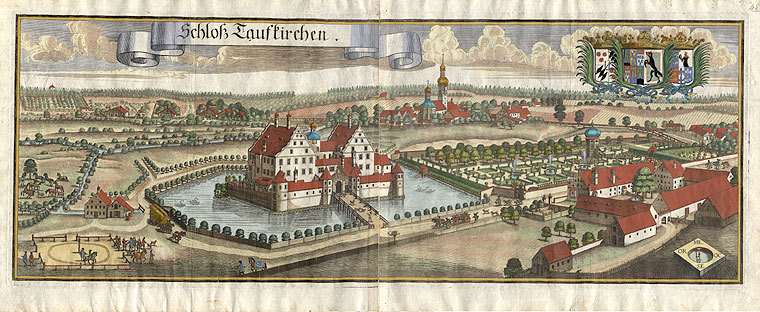
Wasserschloss Taufkirchen

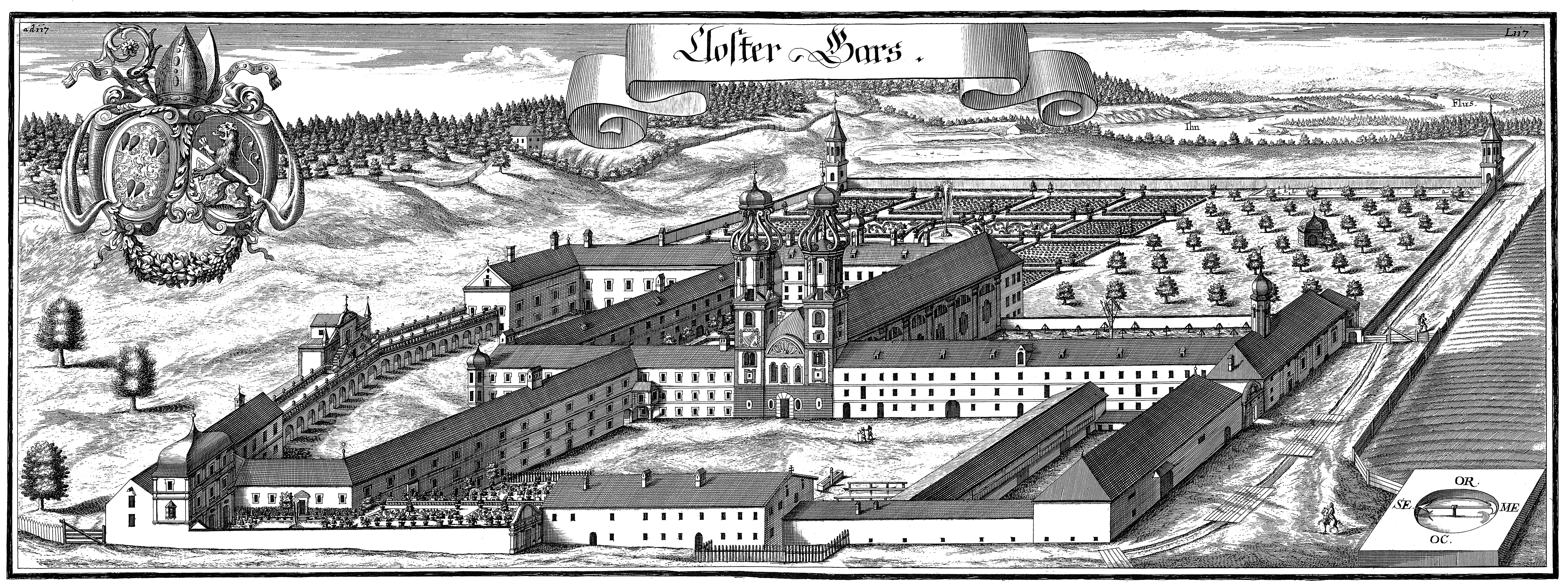
Gars Abbey

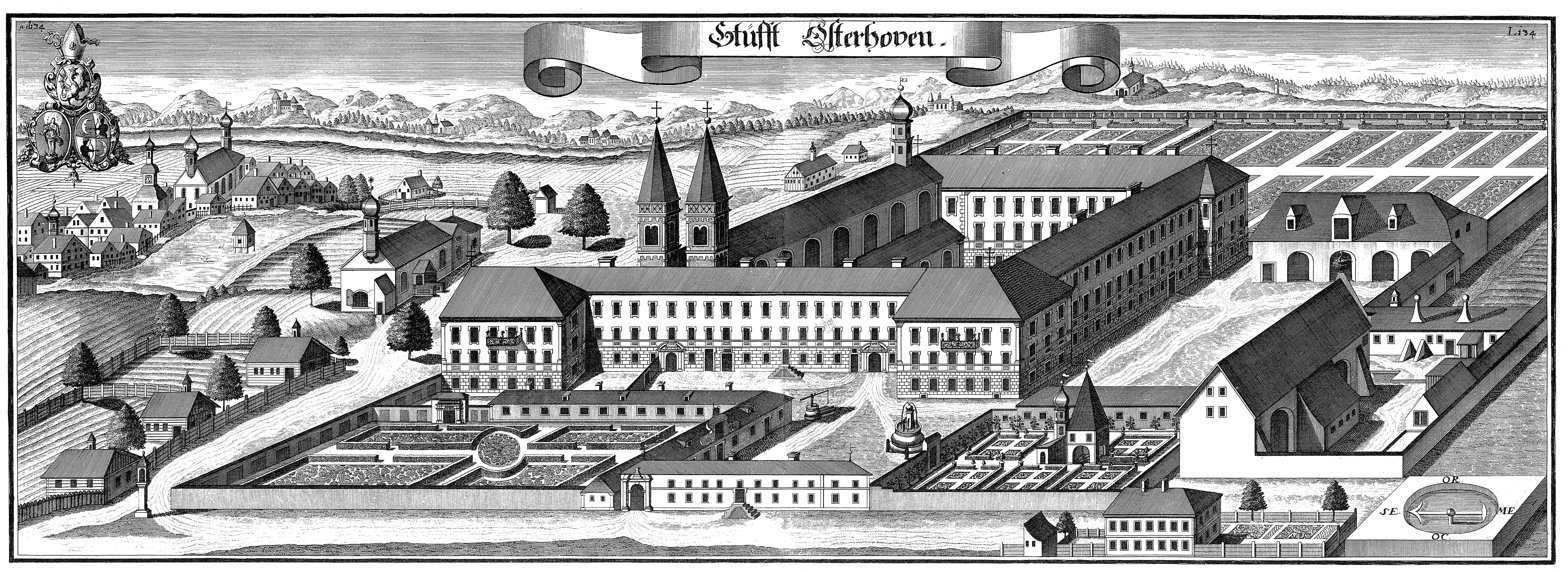
Osterhofen Abbey

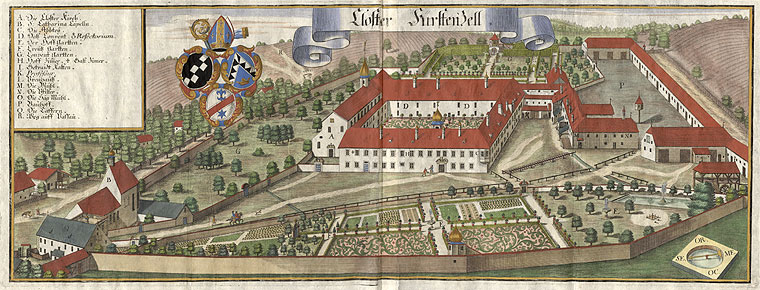
Fürstenzell Abbey

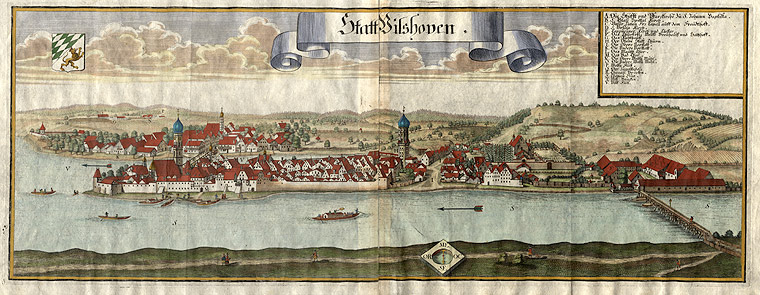
Town of Vilshofen an der Donau

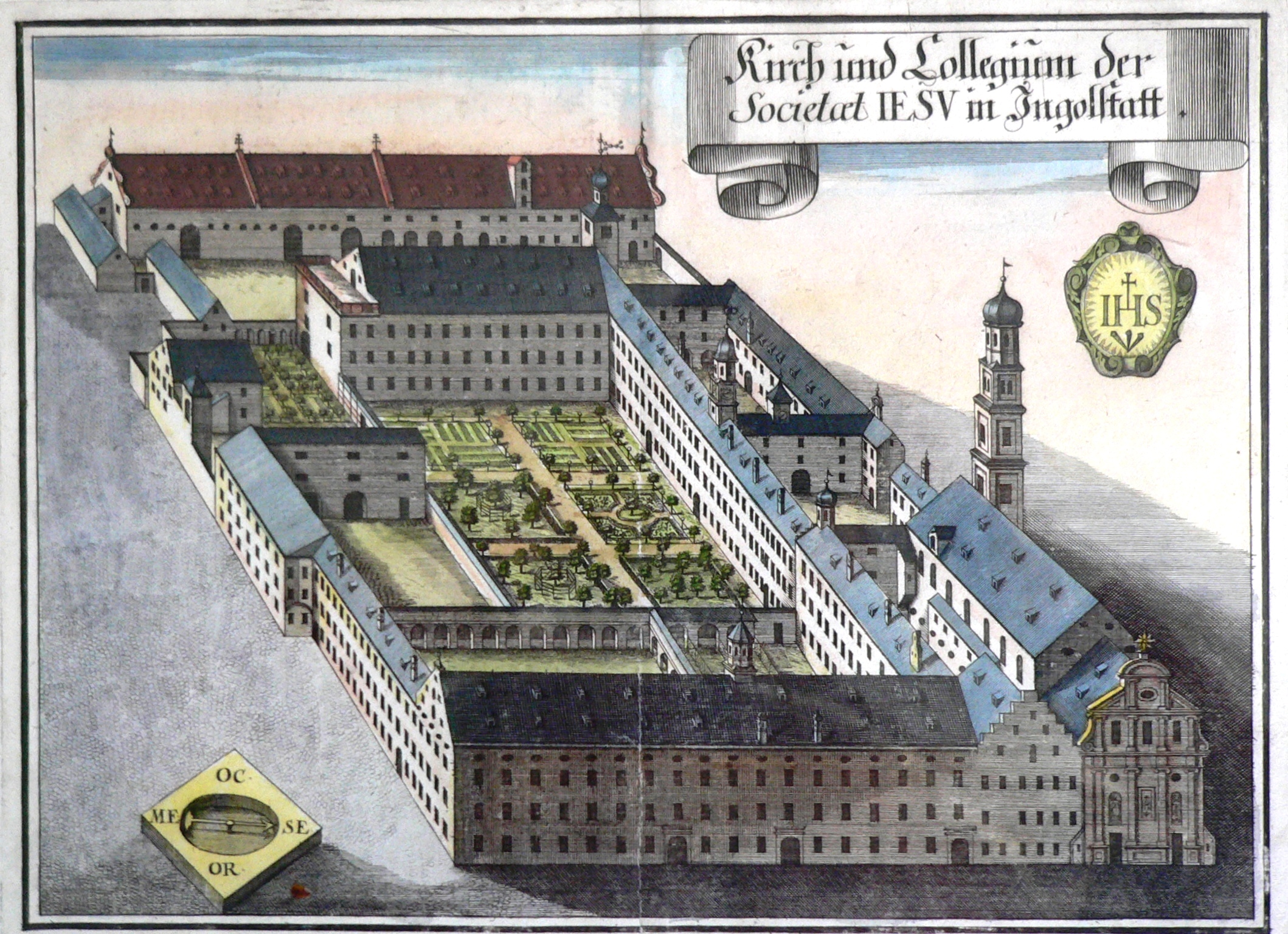
Jesuit College of Ingolstadt

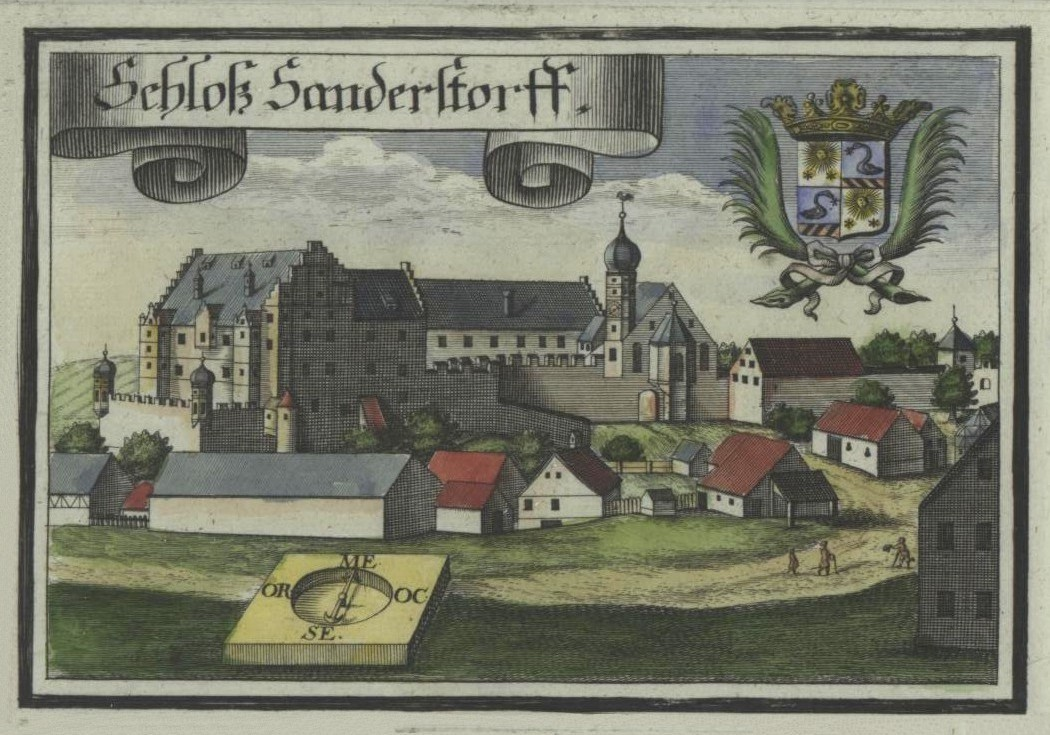
Sandersdorf Castle

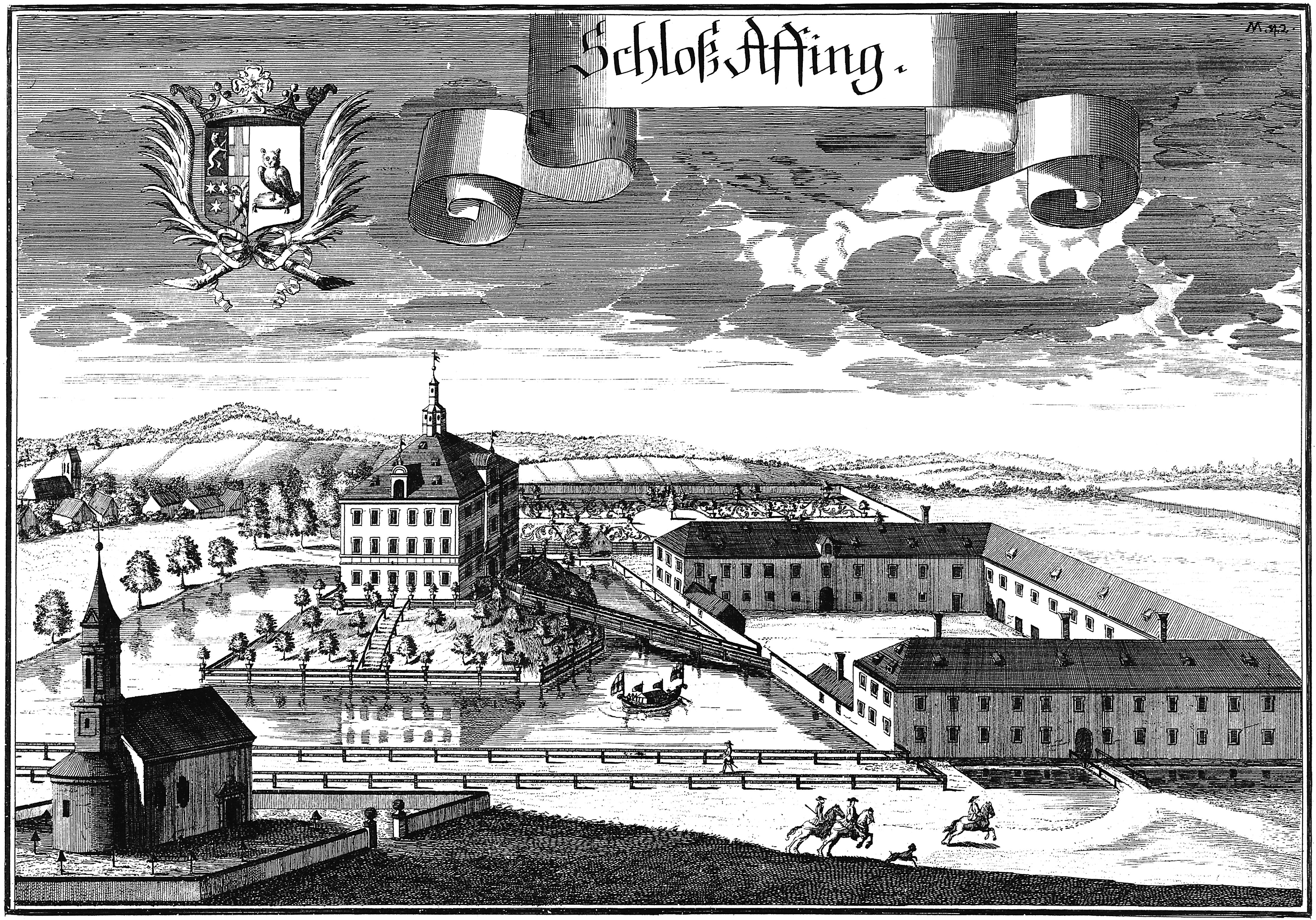
Schloss Affing

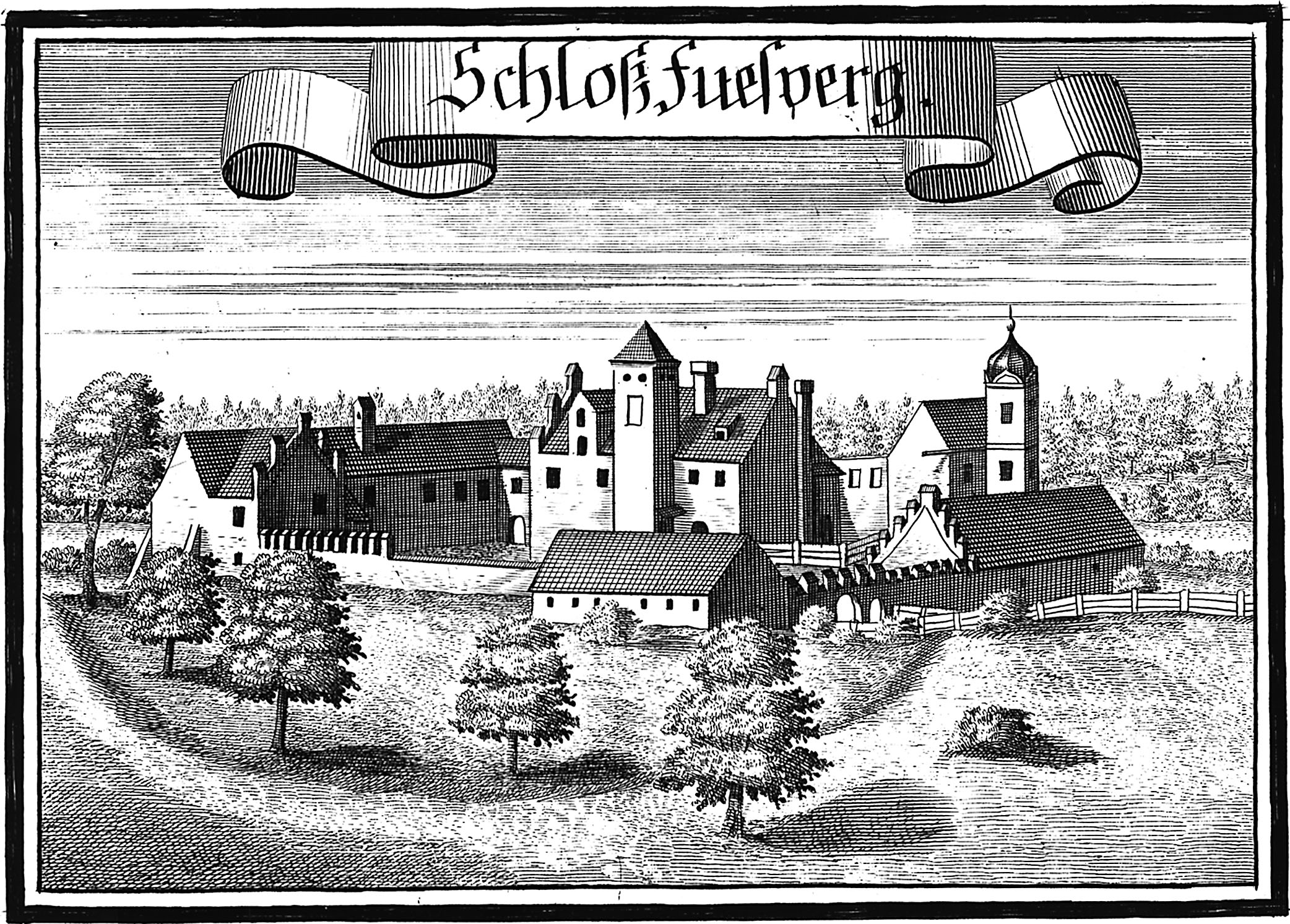
Schloss Fußberg in Gauting

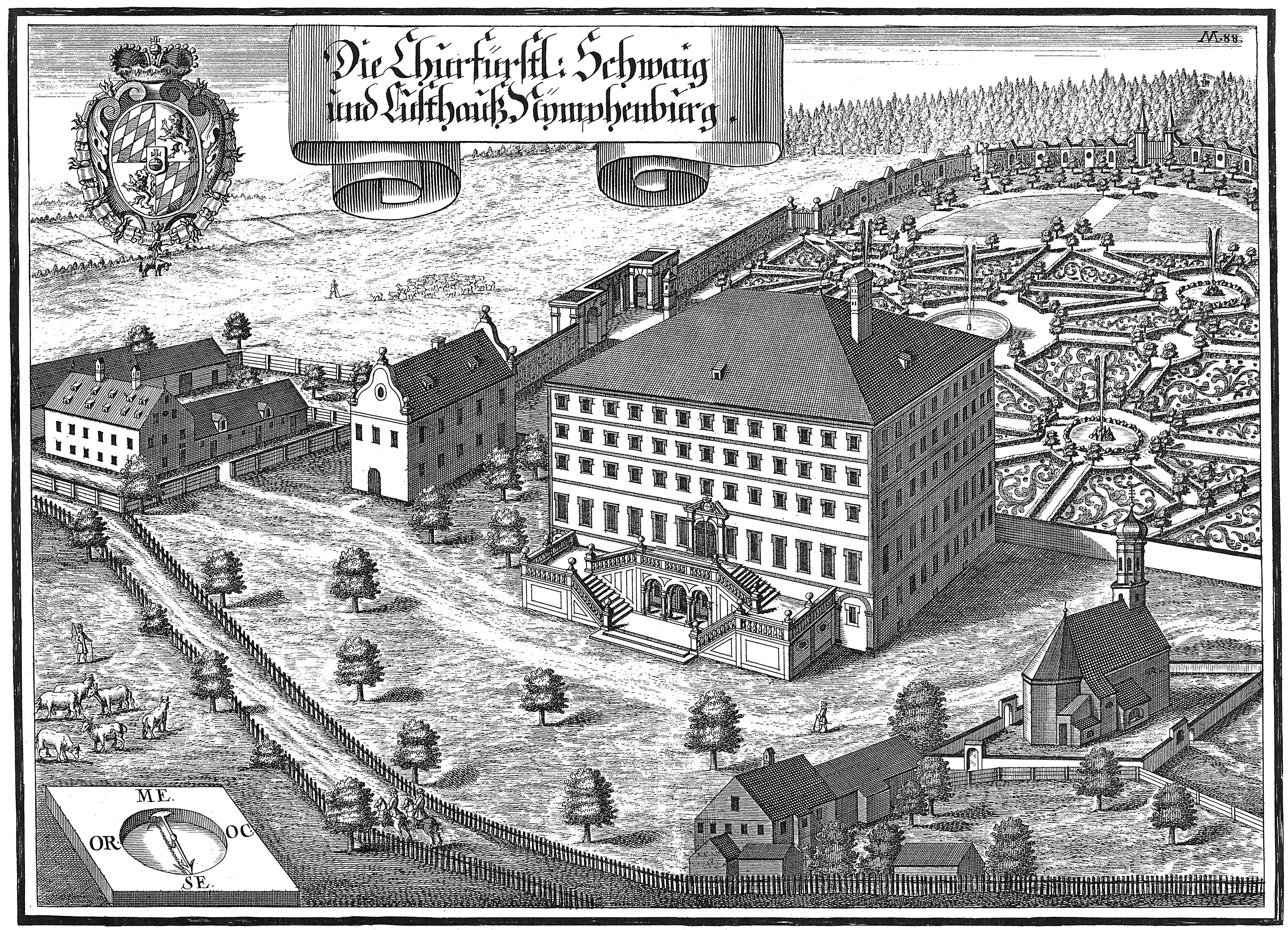
Nymphenburg Palace in Munich

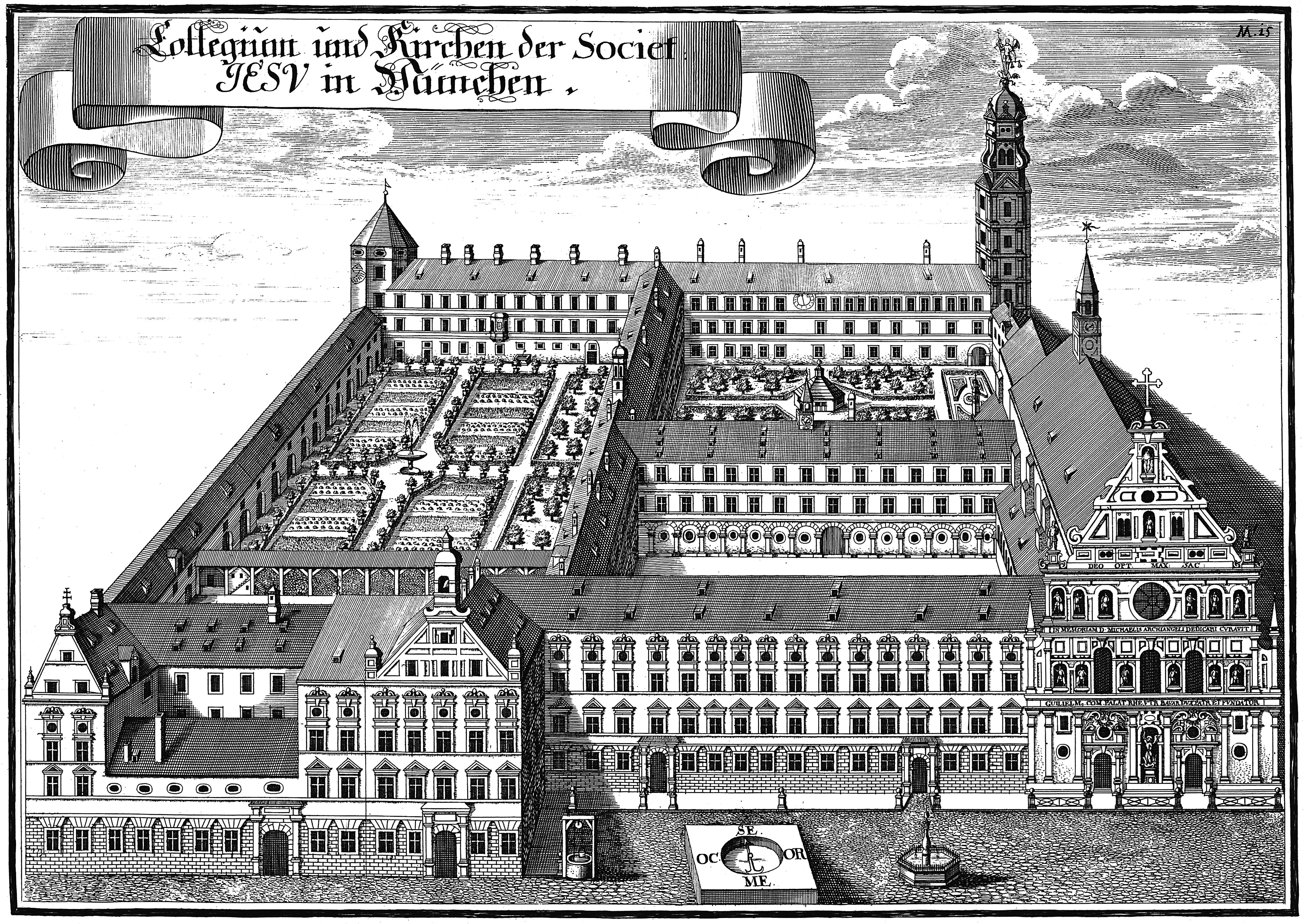
Old Academy in Munich

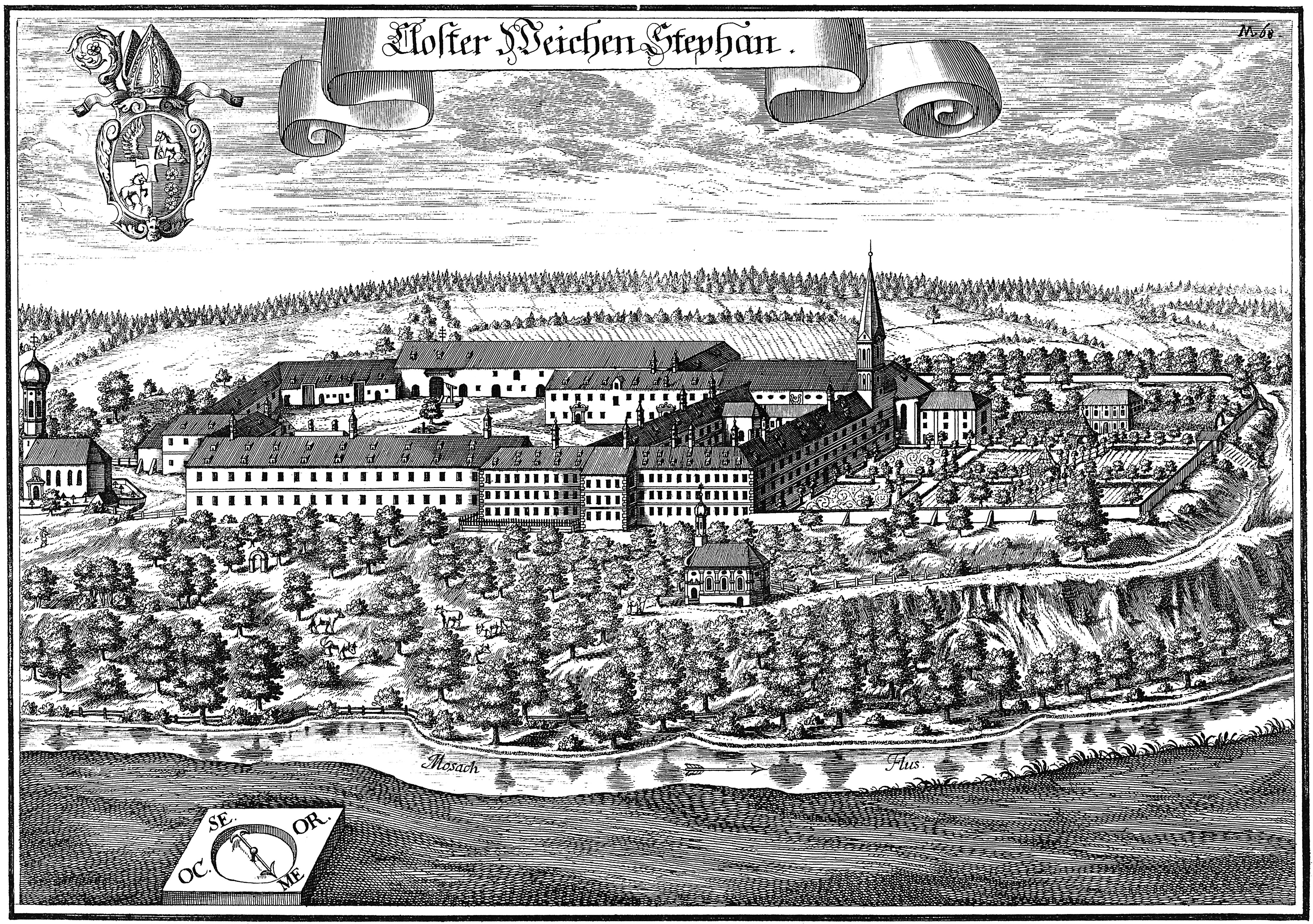
Weihenstephan Abbey

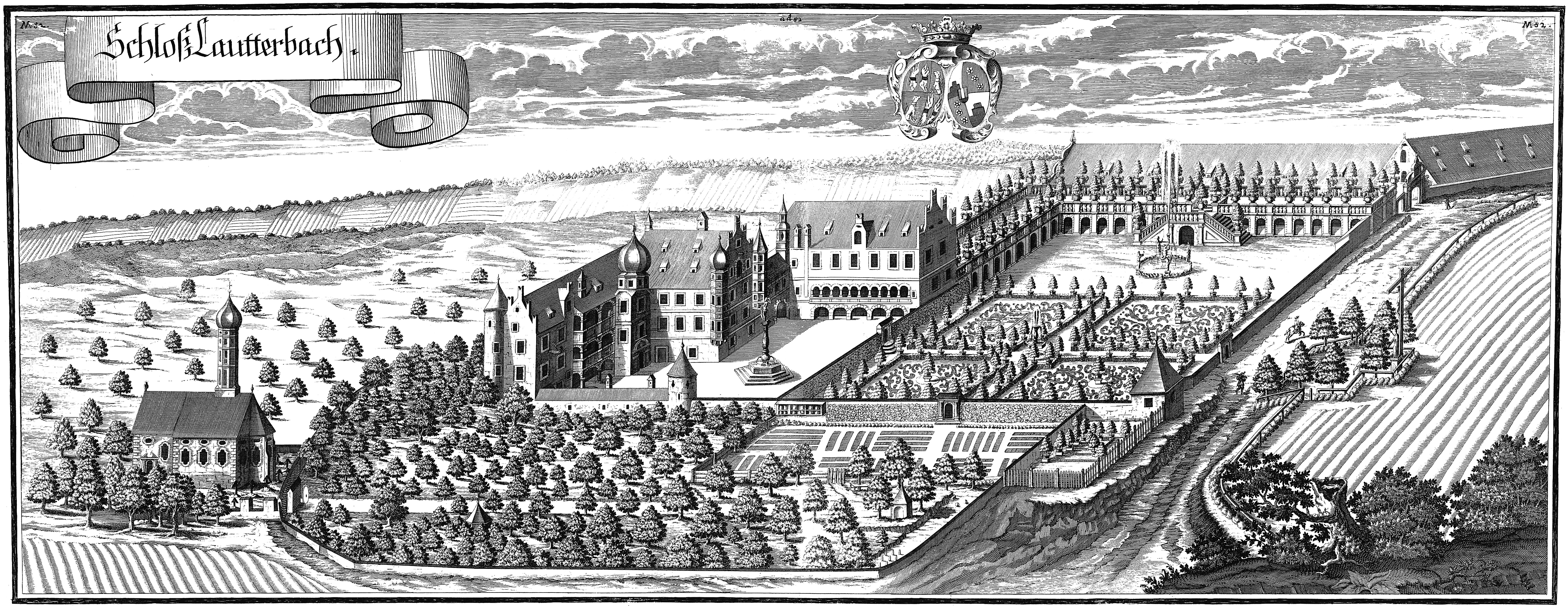
Schloss Lauterbach

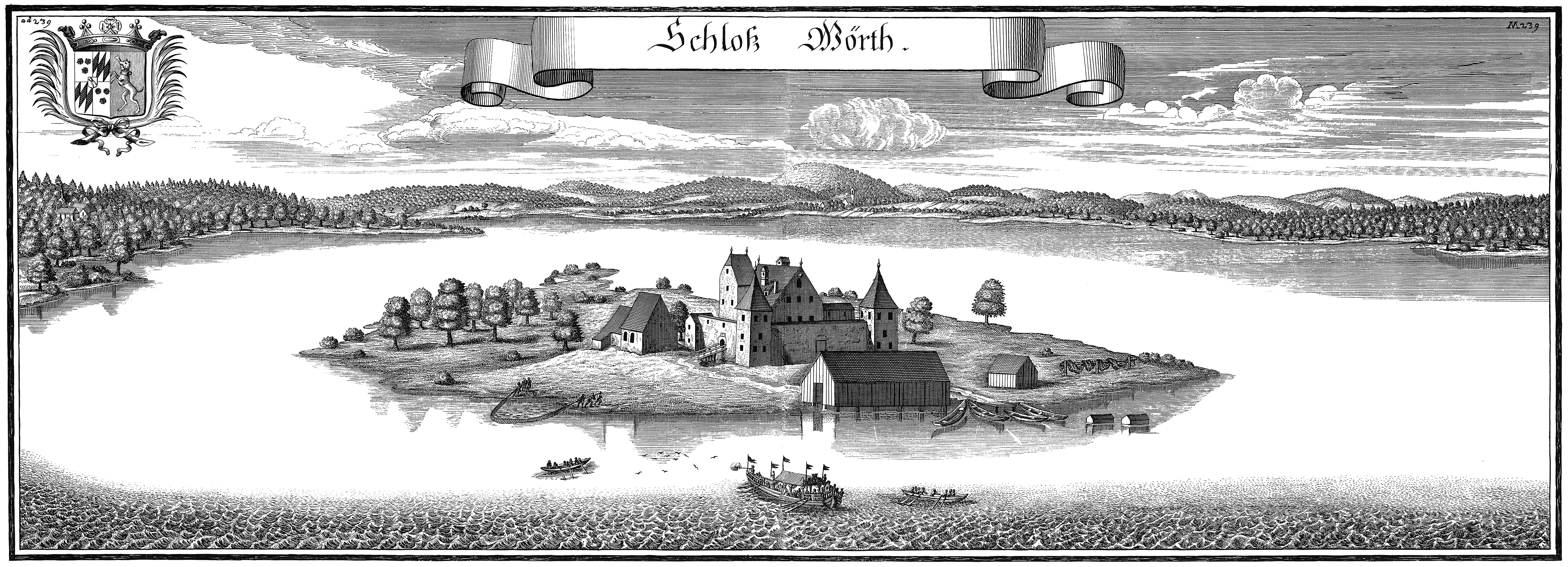
Wörth castle on the island of Wörth, Worthsee

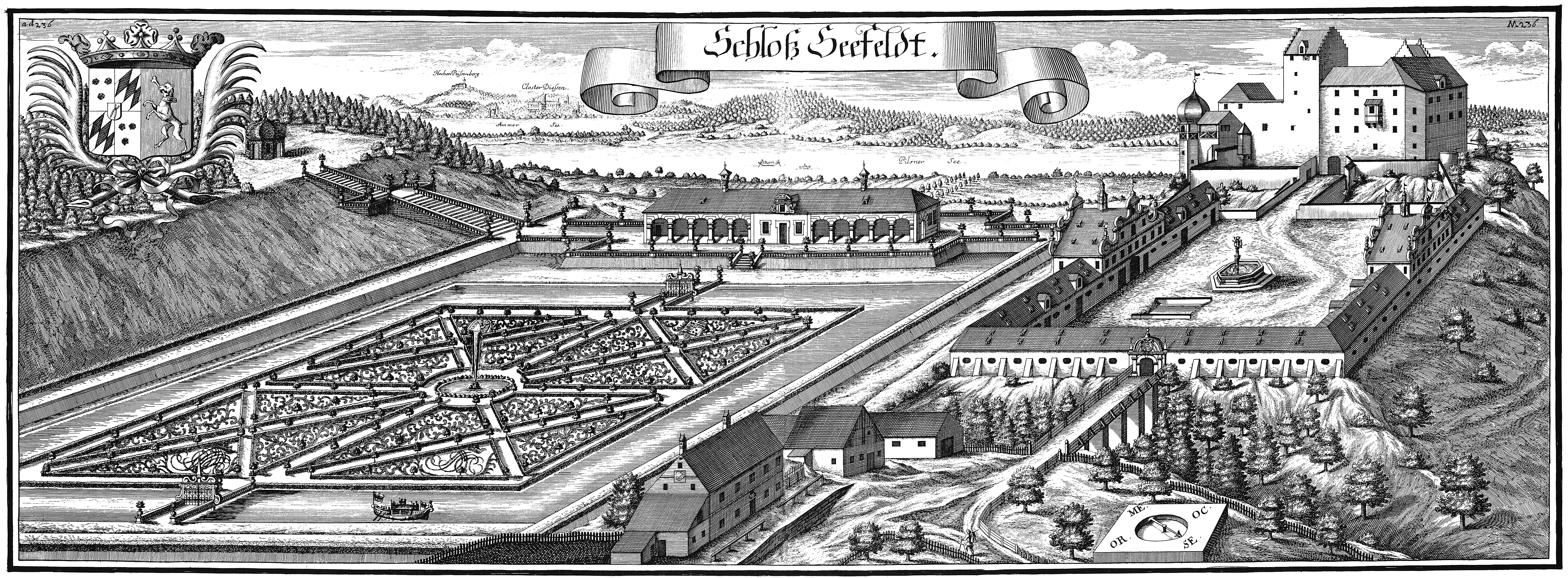
Seefeld Castle

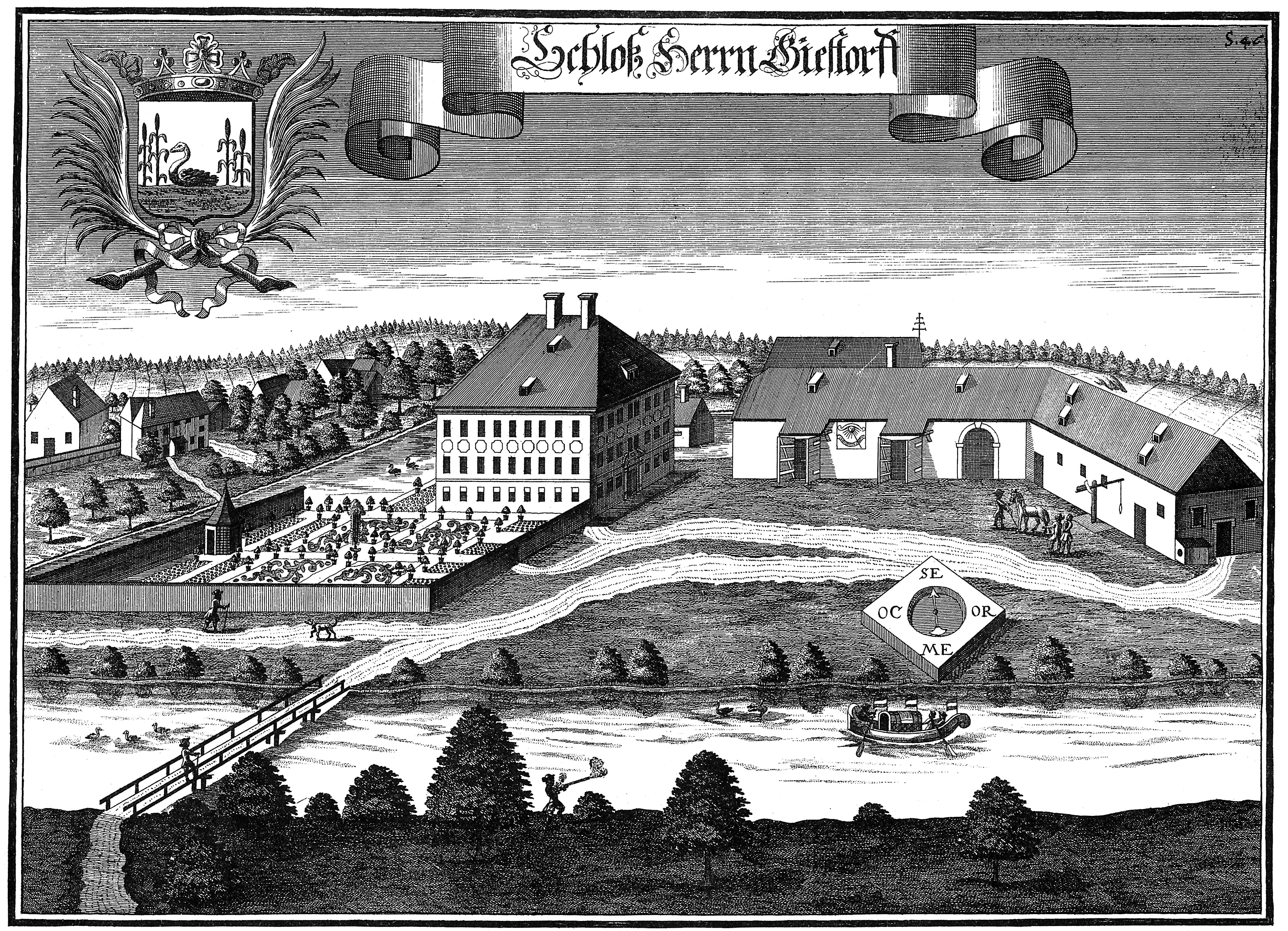
Herrngiersdorf Castle
