= Schloss Deutenhofen =

- Deutenhofen, Hebertshausen, Bavaria, Germany
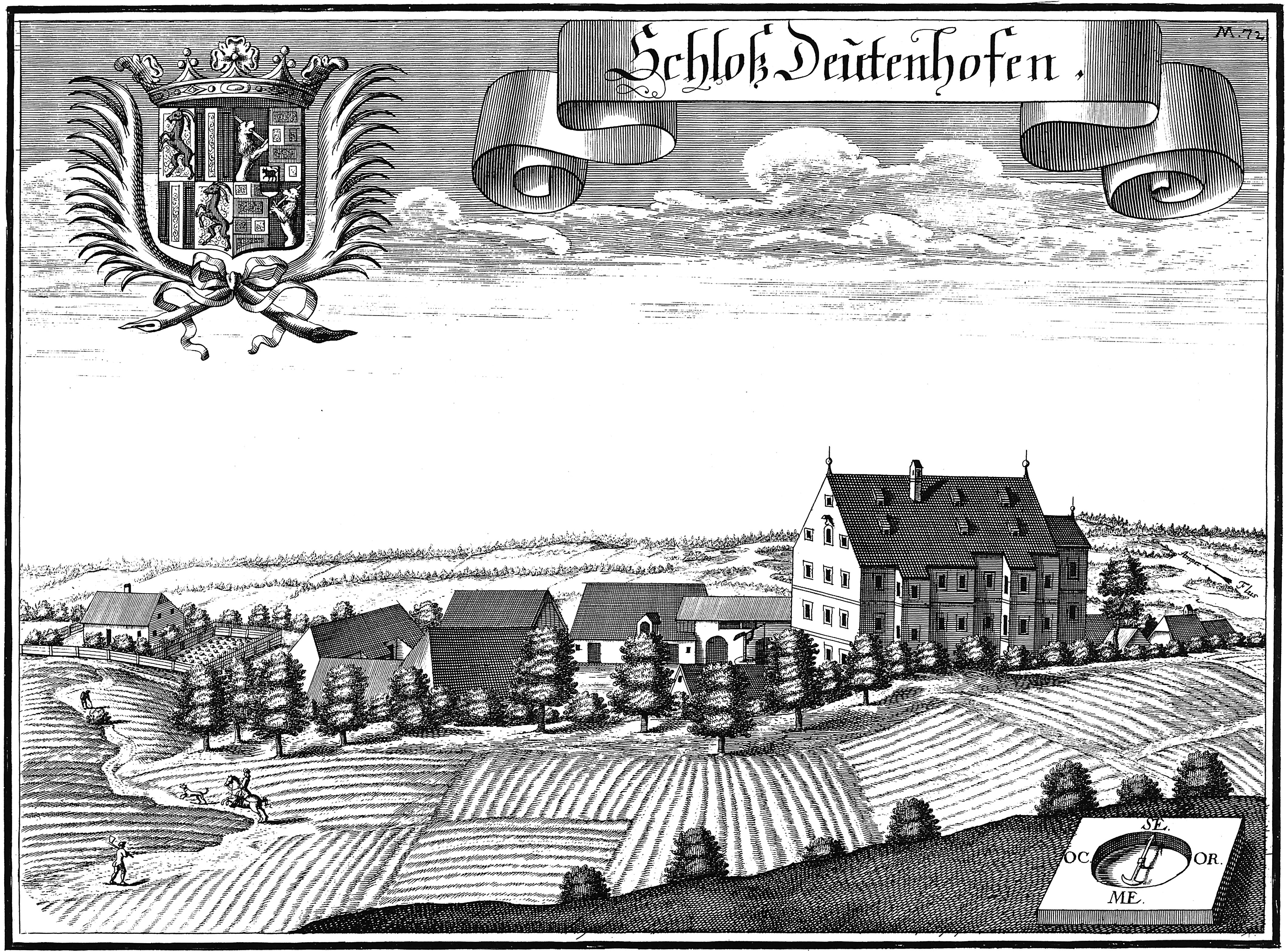
- View of the castle by Michael Wening, c. 1700

Location
- Location in Bavaria
- Coordinates: 48.294365°N 11.475073°E

Schloss Deutenhofen is a large house in Deutenhofen, a village in the municipality of Hebertshausen in Bavaria, Germany.

== History ==
Deutenhofen is first mentioned around 926-937 as "Titinhoua" (Hof des Tito). The settlement may well be older based on its name. The castle was built some time before 1341, when the owner was the knight Ulrich Gruber. Around 1550 it became the seat of the Tewtenhofen hofmark, a form of Bavarian feudal estate, and remained so until 1834. From the 16th century it was the property of the Reitmor (Reitmayer) family, who converted it to approximately its current form.

Dr. Johann von Mändl was born on 8 January 1588 as a commoner, studied jurisprudence in Ingolstadt and in Perugia, Italy, and then joined the service of Maximilian I, Elector of Bavaria. He rose to a position equivalent to Minister of Finance. He was ennobled in 1623, and bought the hofmark of Deutenhofen in 1624. In 1632 the castle was burned down by Swedes under Bernard of Saxe-Weimar during the Thirty Years' War. After the war Johann von Mändl rebuilt and expanded the building. In 1834 it was sold to the Count of Spreti.

== Recent years ==
After World War II the castle was used as an auxiliary hospital. In 1970 it became a nursing home for old people operated by the Bavarian Red Cross. Starting in 2012 the building became a refugee center. The Dachau District was assigned about 100 refugees by the government of Upper Bavaria at relatively short notice. With no time for renovations, the first refugees would be accommodated in rooms already suitable for occupation by the old people.

The old portion of the schloss contains a small chapel, a simple, white-painted room with a vaulted ceiling.
