= Wörthsee =

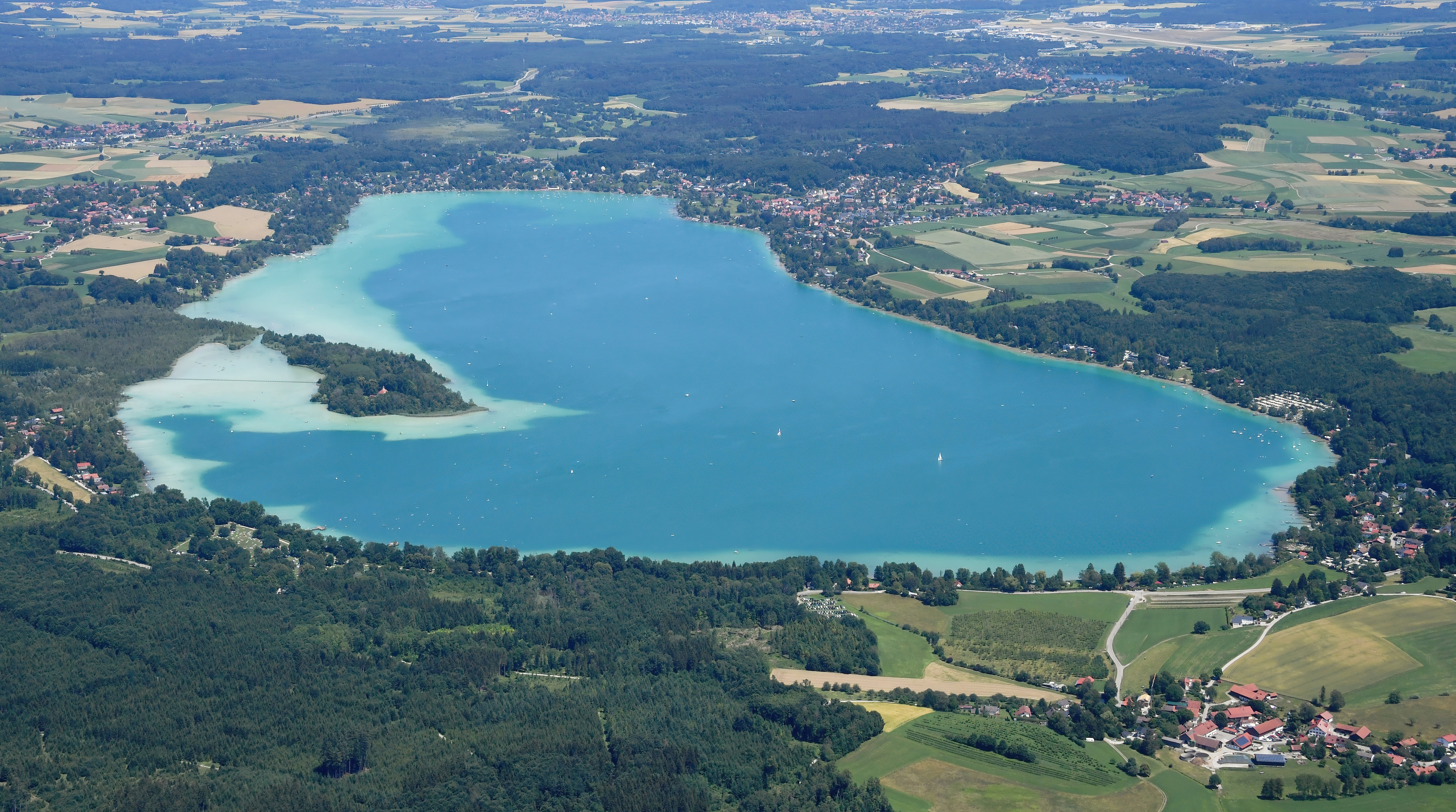

- Location within Bavaria

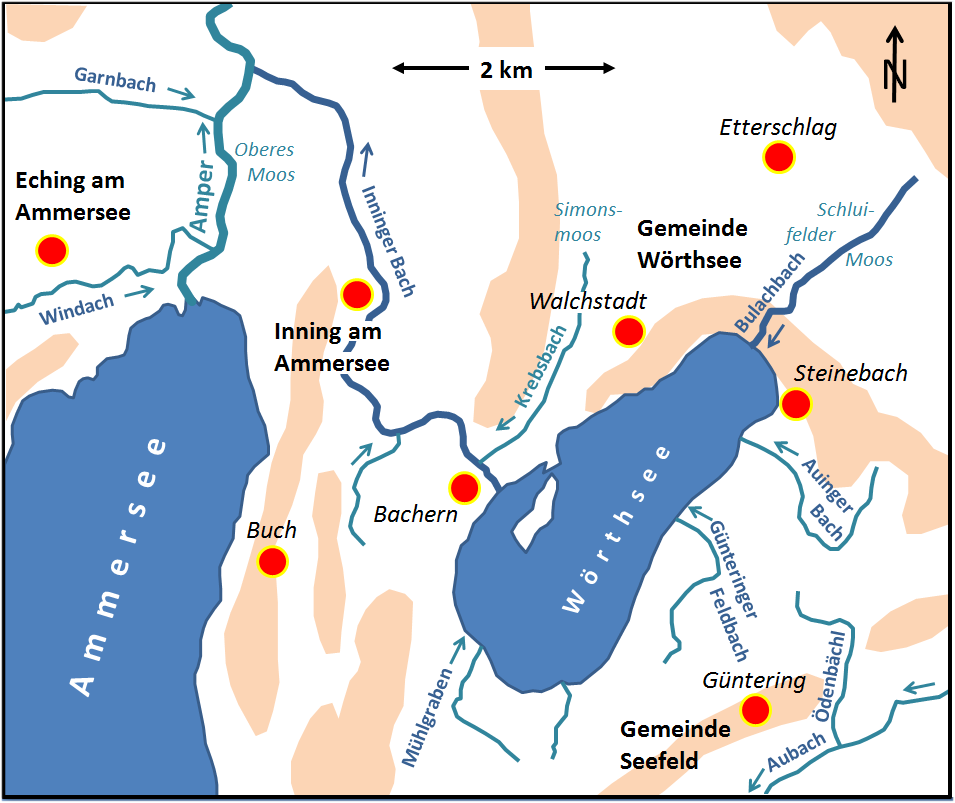
- Catchment area of the lake. Glacial moraine is shaded.
- Location: Starnberg district of Bavaria
- Coordinates: 48.058611°N 11.171111°E
- Type: Glacial lake
- Catchment area: 26.35 square kilometres (10.17 sq mi)
- Basin countries: Germany
- Max. length: 3.7 kilometres (2.3 mi)
- Max. width: 1.6 kilometres (0.99 mi)
- Surface area: 4.3 square kilometres (1.7 sq mi)
- Max. depth: 34 metres (112 ft)
- Surface elevation: 560.4 metres (1,839 ft)
- Islands: Mausinsel

Location in Bavaria

Wörthsee (German pronunciation: [ˈvœʁtˌzeː], "Wörth lake") is a lake in the Starnberg district of Bavaria, Germany. It is one of the lakes of the Fünfseenland (Five lakes) region, which contains the remains of a great glacial lake.

== Location ==
The Wörthsee is located to the east of the Ammersee and southwest of Munich. The lake mostly lies in the Inning am Ammersee and Wörthsee municipalities, but a small part lies in the Seefeld municipality. The Wörthsee, Ammersee, Starnberger See, Pilsensee and Weßlinger See make up the five lakes from which the Fünfseenland takes its name. The Wörthsee is the third largest of the lakes.

== Hydrology ==
The lake is 3.7 by 1.6 kilometres (2.30 by 0.99 mi), with an area of 4.3 square kilometres (1.7 sq mi) and a maximum depth of 34 metres (112 ft). It has a mean water level of 560.4 metres (1,839 ft) above sea level. The catchment area is 26.35 square kilometres (10.17 sq mi). The lake is largely fed by groundwater, and discharges just 0.3 cubic metres (11 cu ft) per second.

== Island ==
The lake is named after the island of Wörth, which lies in the western part of the lake. The island is commonly called Mausinsel (Mouse Island). This name comes from an old legend. Many years ago a rich but hard-hearted count owned the island. During a time of famine, some peasants came to ask him for food. He had them herded into a barn, which was set on fire. When the wailing of the dying peasants died down, the count said "do you hear that whimpering of rats and mice. Soon these pests will be exterminated." The count rode back to his castle, which was invaded by a swarm of rats and mice that even stole the food from his plate. He fled to the island, but they followed him there and ate him alive. They then disappeared.

The island is privately owned, and is not accessible to the public. It contains the Wörthschlössl mansion, which dates to 1146, and its chapel of St. Simpert. The mansion was formerly used by the Count of Toerring as his summer residence.

== Activities ==
The shore is largely built up, making the lake difficult to access. There are five points around the lake where it may be accessed by swimmers. The lake is thought to be one of the cleanest and warmest in Bavaria. The Augustiner am Worthsee restaurant has a terrace on the shore of the lake.

== Gallery ==
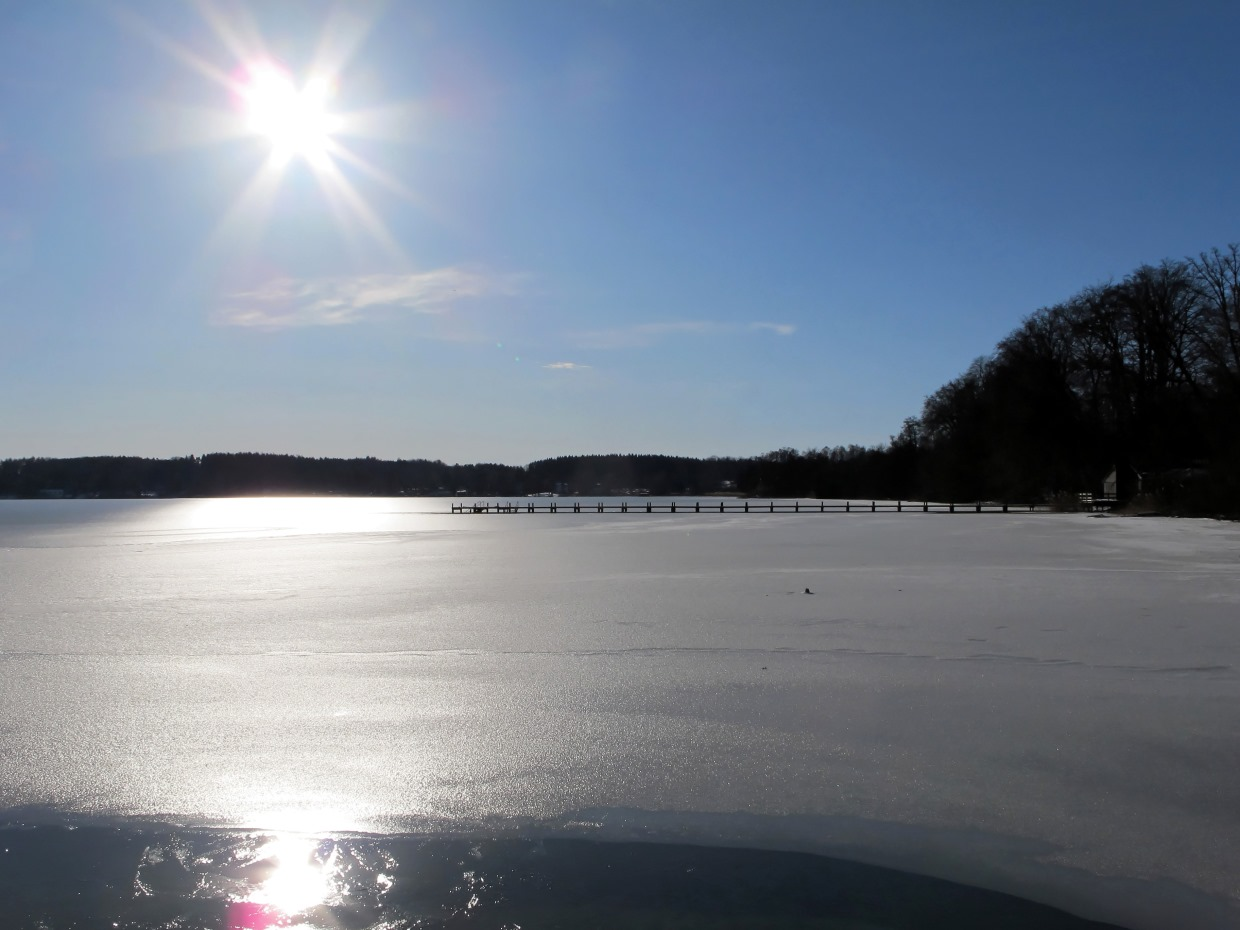
Wörthsee at Oberndorf in Winter

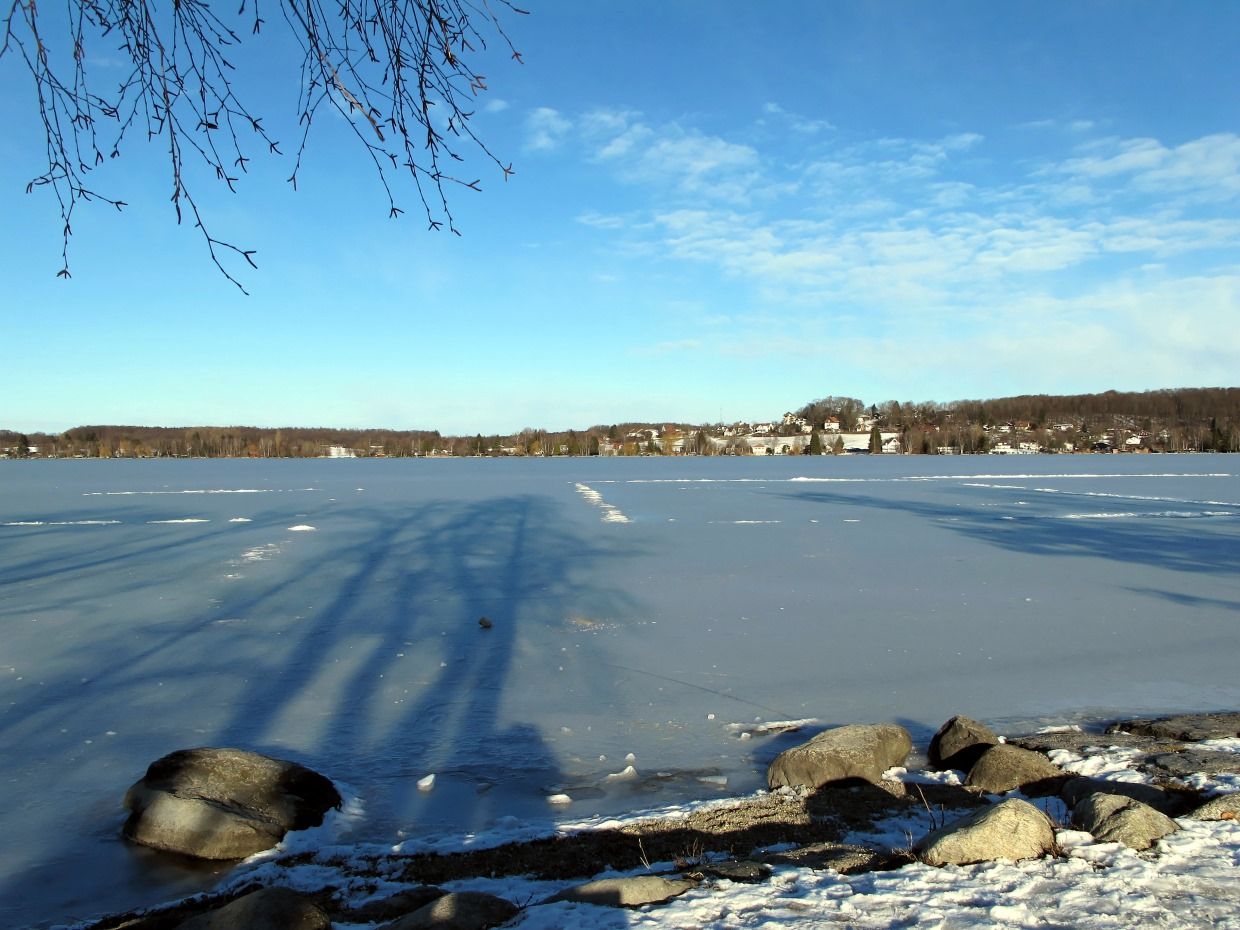
View looking northwest across the lake from Steinebach Village

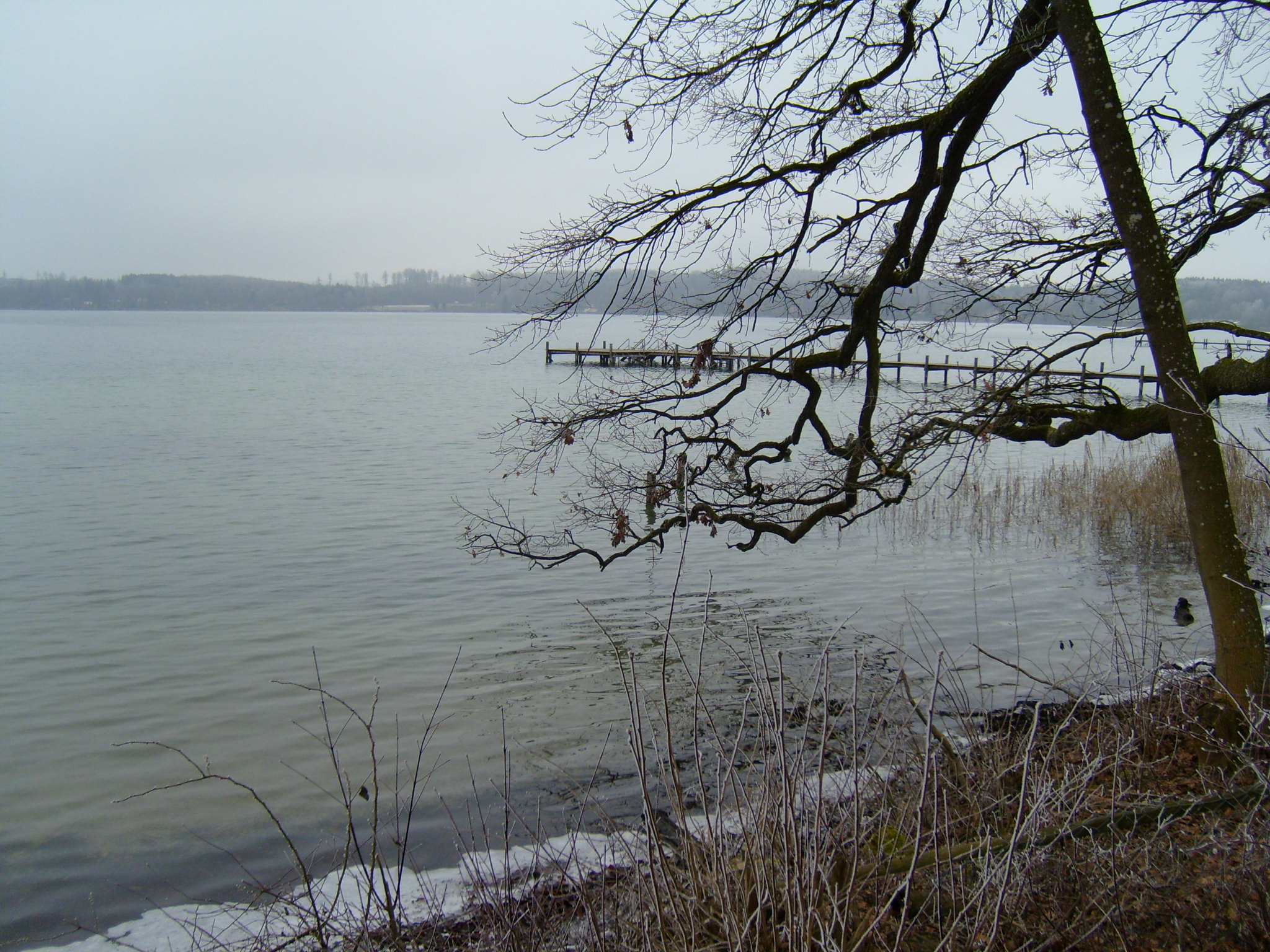
