= Leopold Schmid =

German footballer (born 2008)

Personal information
- Date of birth: 16 February 2008 (age 18)
- Positions: Midfielder; centre-back

Team information
- Current team: Bayern Munich II

Youth career
- 2012–2018: SC Wörthsee
- 2018–: Bayern Munich

Senior career*
Years	Team	Apps	(Gls)
2026–	Bayern Munich II	1	(0)

International career^{‡}
2023	Germany U15	1	(0)
2023	Germany U16	2	(0)
- * Club domestic league appearances and goals as of 21 April 2025 ‡ National team caps and goals as of 16 October 2023

Leopold Schmid (born 16 February 2008) is a German professional footballer who plays as a midfielder and centre-back for Regionalliga Bayern club Bayern Munich II. He is a former German youth international.

== Club career ==
Schmid is a youth product of Bundesliga giants Bayern Munich, having joined the academy in 2018, after playing six years with SC Wörthsee, he became a highly regarded prospect through his progression and development, eventually getting called up to train with the first team by head coach Vincent Kompany in early 2026.

He received his first call-up with Bayern Munich II during the 2025–26 season on 1 April 2026, in a 1–0 away loss Regionalliga Bayern match against SV Wacker Burghausen, as an unused substitute however. Twenty days later Schmid made his professional debut, substituting Vincent Manuba at the 79th minute of a 4–1 away loss Regionalliga Bayern match against 1. FC Nürnberg II, on 21 April.

In May 2026, he extended his contract with Bayern Munich, along with seven other highly regarded FC Bayern Campus players, including Philipp von Taube and Oluwaseyi Wilson.

== International career ==
Schmid has represented Germany at the under-15 and under-16 levels.

== Career statistics ==
As of match played 21 April 2026

Appearances and goals by club, season and competition
Club	Season	League			Cup		Total	
Club	Season	Division	Apps	Goals	Apps	Goals	Apps	Goals
Bayern Munich II	2025–26	Regionalliga Bayern	1	0	—		1	0
Bayern Munich II	Total		1	0	—		1	0
Career Total			1	0	0	0	1	0
