= Mouse Island =

Mouse Island may refer to:

- Mouse Island, Bermuda, an island of Bermuda
- Mouse Island, Ohio, a private island in Lake Erie in Ohio, United States
- Mausinsel ("Mouse island"), an island in the Wörthsee lake in Bavaria, Germany
- Pontikonisi (Ποντικονήσι, "Mouse Island"), an islet off the Greek island of Corfu.
- Pondikonisi (Ποντικονήσι, "Mouse Island"), an uninhabited islet off the Greek island of Crete.
- Mouse Island, a fictional island in the Geronimo Stilton book series.

== See also ==
- Island mouse, a species of rodent in the family Nesomyidae found only in Madagascar
