= Oberpfaffenhofen =

- Ortsteil of Weßling
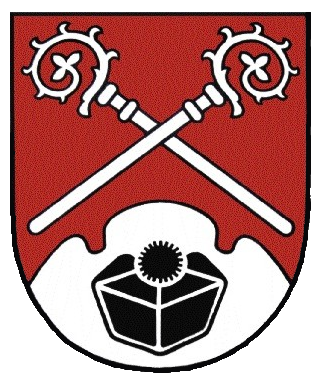
- Coat of arms
- Interactive map of Oberpfaffenhofen
- Location within Germany Location within Bavaria
- Coordinates: 48°4′41″N 11°15′9″E
- Country: Germany
- State: Bavaria
- Admin. region: Oberbayern
- District: Starnberg
- Municipality: Weßling

Population (1987)
  - Total: 1,323
- Time zone: UTC+01:00 (CET)
  - Summer (DST): UTC+02:00 (CEST)
- Postal codes: 82234
- Vehicle registration: STA
- Website: www.gemeinde-wessling.de

Oberpfaffenhofen is a village that is part of the municipality of Weßling in the district of Starnberg, Bavaria, Germany. It is located about 23 km (14 mi) from the city center of Munich.

== Village ==
The village is home to the Oberpfaffenhofen Airport (IATA: OBF, ICAO: EDMO) and a major site of the German Aerospace Center (Deutsches Zentrum für Luft- und Raumfahrt, DLR). In 1983, the first West-German astronaut, the physicist Ulf Merbold, flew to space on board a Space Shuttle in a Spacelab mission that was partly supervised by the German Space Operations Center located at Oberpfaffenhofen.

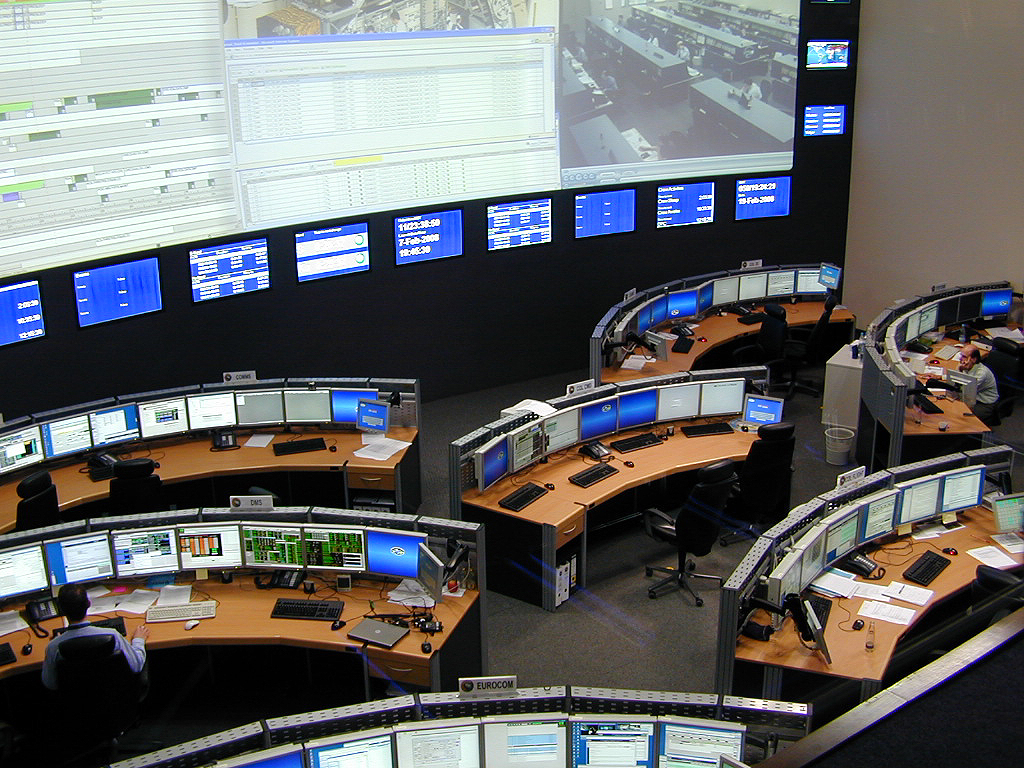
German Space Operations Center (GSOC) in Oberpfaffenhofen

The research center in Oberpfaffenhofen houses the DLR, including the Columbus Control Center which DLR operates for the European Space Agency and Airbus Defence and Space, and also some Fraunhofer Institutes and other scientific institutes. From 2014, OHB group moved the division which formerly was Kayser-Threde, from Munich to Oberpfaffenhofen.

Also situated in Oberpfaffenhofen is the industrial area of (the now insolvent) Dornier Luftfahrt GmbH (later part of Fairchild Dornier). The aircraft manufacturer shared the airfield with the DLR.

During the post-WW2 Allied occupation of Germany, the airport was designated Oberpfaffenhofen Air Force Depot which also served as the maintenance depot for the aircraft that were utilized during the Berlin Airlift of 1948–49.
