= Weßling =

- Municipality
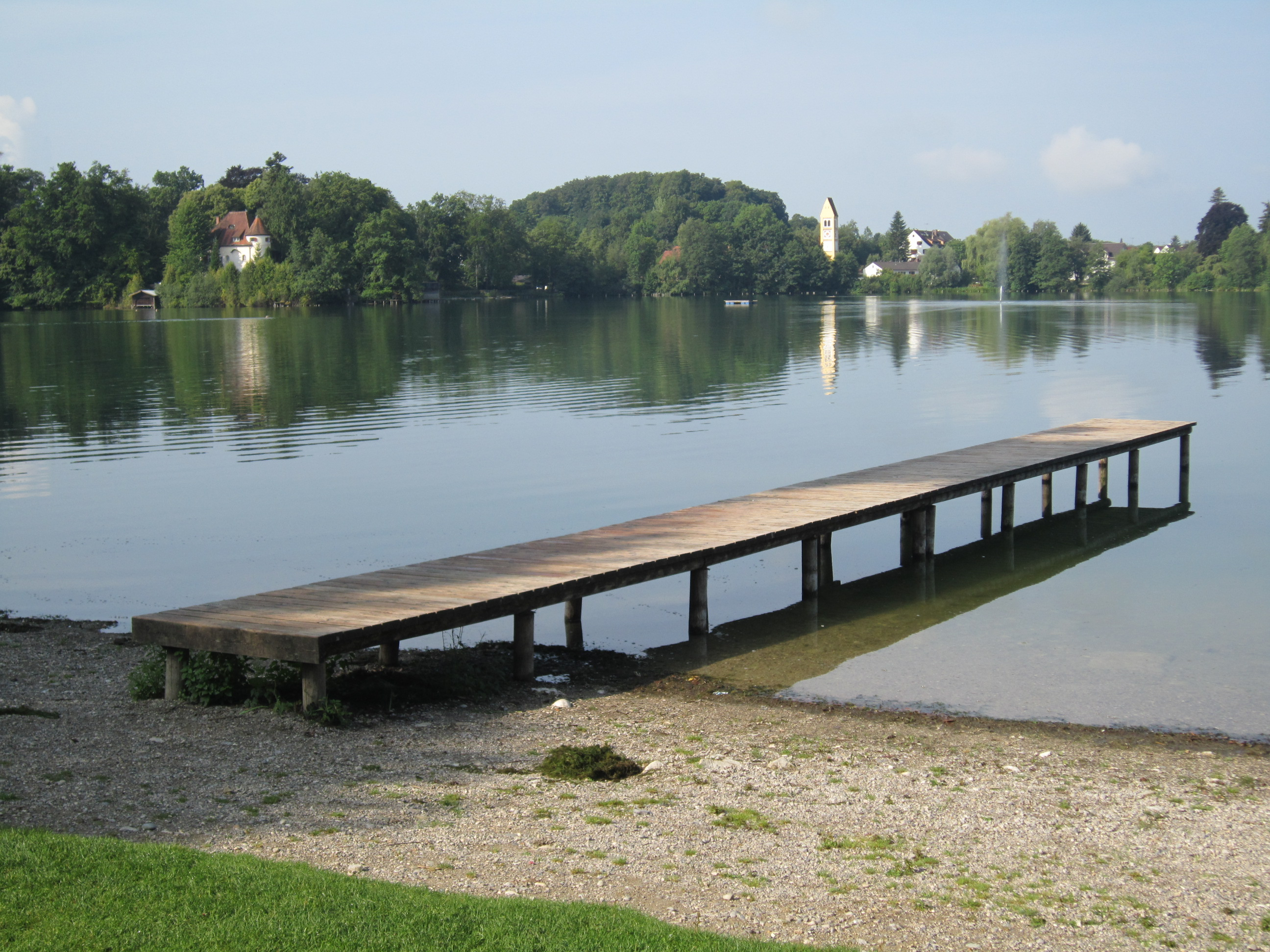
- Lake Weßling with the town of Weßling in the background

- Coat of arms

- Location of Weßling within Starnberg district
- Interactive map of Weßling
- Location within Germany Location within Bavaria
- Coordinates: 48°4′41″N 11°15′9″E
- Country: Germany
- State: Bavaria
- Admin. region: Oberbayern
- District: Starnberg

Government
  - Mayor (2020–26): Michael Sturm (FW)

Area
  - Total: 22.6 km^{2} (8.7 sq mi)
- Elevation: 592 m (1,942 ft)

Population (2025-12-31)
  - Total: 5,585
  - Density: 247/km^{2} (640/sq mi)
- Time zone: UTC+01:00 (CET)
  - Summer (DST): UTC+02:00 (CEST)
- Postal codes: 82234
- Dialling codes: 08153
- Vehicle registration: STA
- Website: www.gemeinde-wessling.de

Weßling (German pronunciation: [ˈvɛslɪŋ]) is a municipality in the district of Starnberg in Bavaria, Germany.

== History ==
Weßling was first mentioned in the 13th century, when it was passed to Seefeld Castle. In 1810 it was recorded to consist of 37 farms and in 1877 to have a population of 230. Since, starting from the 19th century, it was visited by several painters and sculptors (e.g. Carl Schuch, Pierre-Auguste Renoir, Wilhelm Trübner), the town is regarded by some as an artists' colony. In 1903, when Weßling had a population of 350, the construction of a railway from Munich to Herrsching led to a moderately increased influx of population around Lake Weßling. The town of Oberpfaffenhofen, which is now part of Weßling, gained some importance as an industrial and research location in 1936, when an airport was built there by the aircraft manufacturer Dornier. In 1972 and 1976 the municipalities of Hochstadt and Oberpfaffenhofen respectively were incorporated into Weßling.

== Geography ==
Weßling is located within the Fünfseenland (lit. 'five lakes country'). The town completely encloses Lake Weßling, the smallest of the five lakes.

Weßling is divided into three main districts:

- Weßling
- Oberpfaffenhofen, incorporated in 1976.
- Hochstadt, incorporated in 1972.

== Transport ==
=== Road ===
Weßling lies very close to the Autobahn. On weekends and holidays the town often experiences heavy traffic due to visitors from nearby Munich. A bypass, built in 2016 west of Weßling, did not improve these traffic issues.

Currently there are five regional bus lines (X910 921 923 947 955) connecting Weßling to the surrounding towns and cities.

=== Rail ===
The town has one train station served by the Munich S-Bahn, which runs from Herrsching to Munich airport.

=== Air ===
An airport is located in the district of Oberpfaffenhofen. Even though this is the third largest civilian airport in Bavaria, it is not served by any airlines. Instead it is used for research and industrial purposes.

== Sport ==
The local sports club SC Weßling was founded in 1936. It is notable that the ice hockey division played in the highest German ice hockey league for five seasons. In 1958, SC Weßling, which played on natural ice, even qualified for the first season of the newly founded Ice hockey Bundesliga.

== Industry ==
Historically the aircraft manufacturer Dornier located at the airport in Oberpfaffenhofen was the biggest employer in Weßling and the surrounding region. In 2006 however, Dornier went bankrupt together with its parent company Fairchild Aircraft. Nevertheless, the local industry is still dominated by aerospace companies. Some of the largest and best known employers located around the airport in Oberpfaffenhofen are:

- German Aerospace Center
- RUAG
- Galileo ground control center
- OHB
- Lilium GmbH

== Famous people ==
=== Born in Weßling ===
- Anton Besold, born in 1904, politician, member of German parliament
- Anton G. Leitner, born in 1961, publisher
- Wilhelm Edelmann, born in 1931, ice hockey player
- Erich Schneider-Wessling, born in 1931, architect

=== Notable residents ===
- Alois Alzheimer, psychiatrist
- Graham Waterhouse, composer
- Heinrich Brüne, painter
- Heinrich Kiel, painter

== Gallery ==
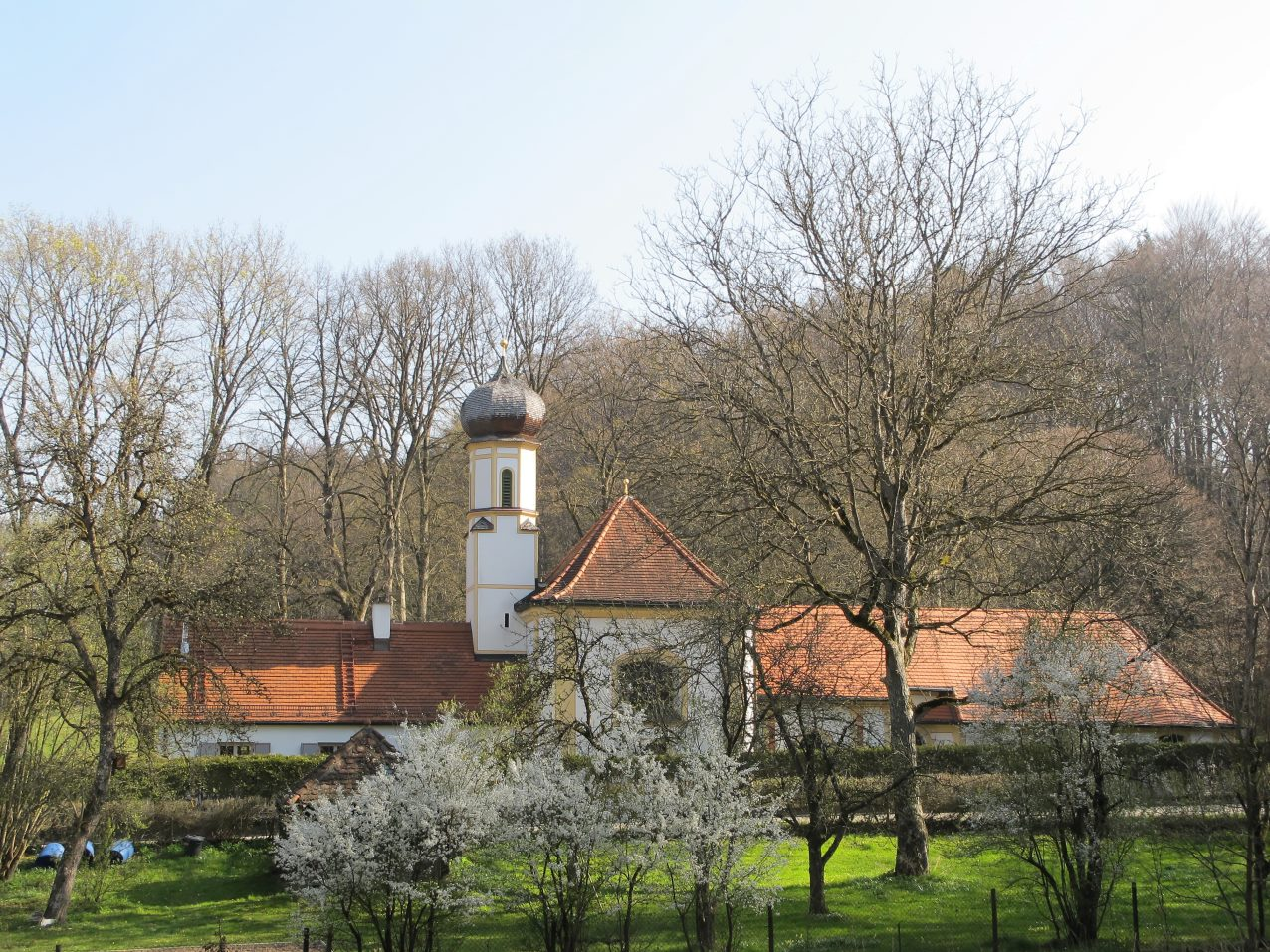
Pilgrimage church in Grünsink

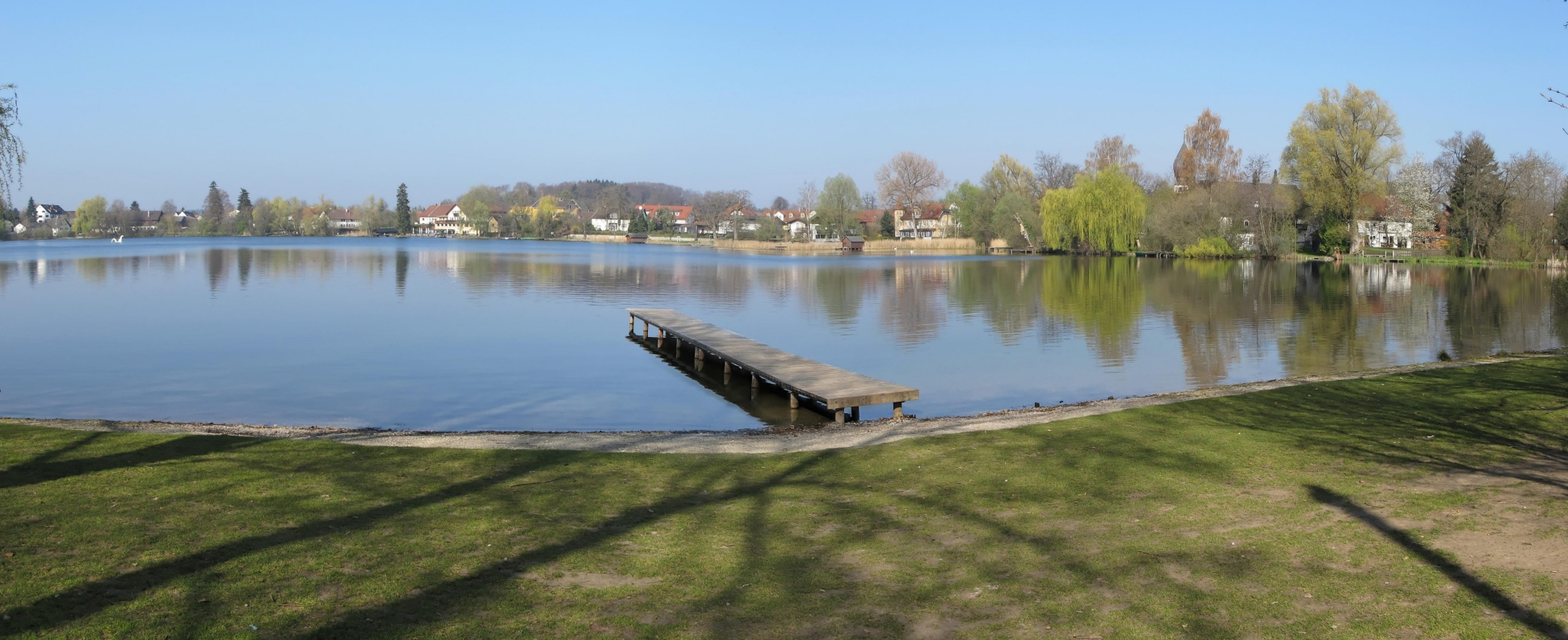
Lake Weßling

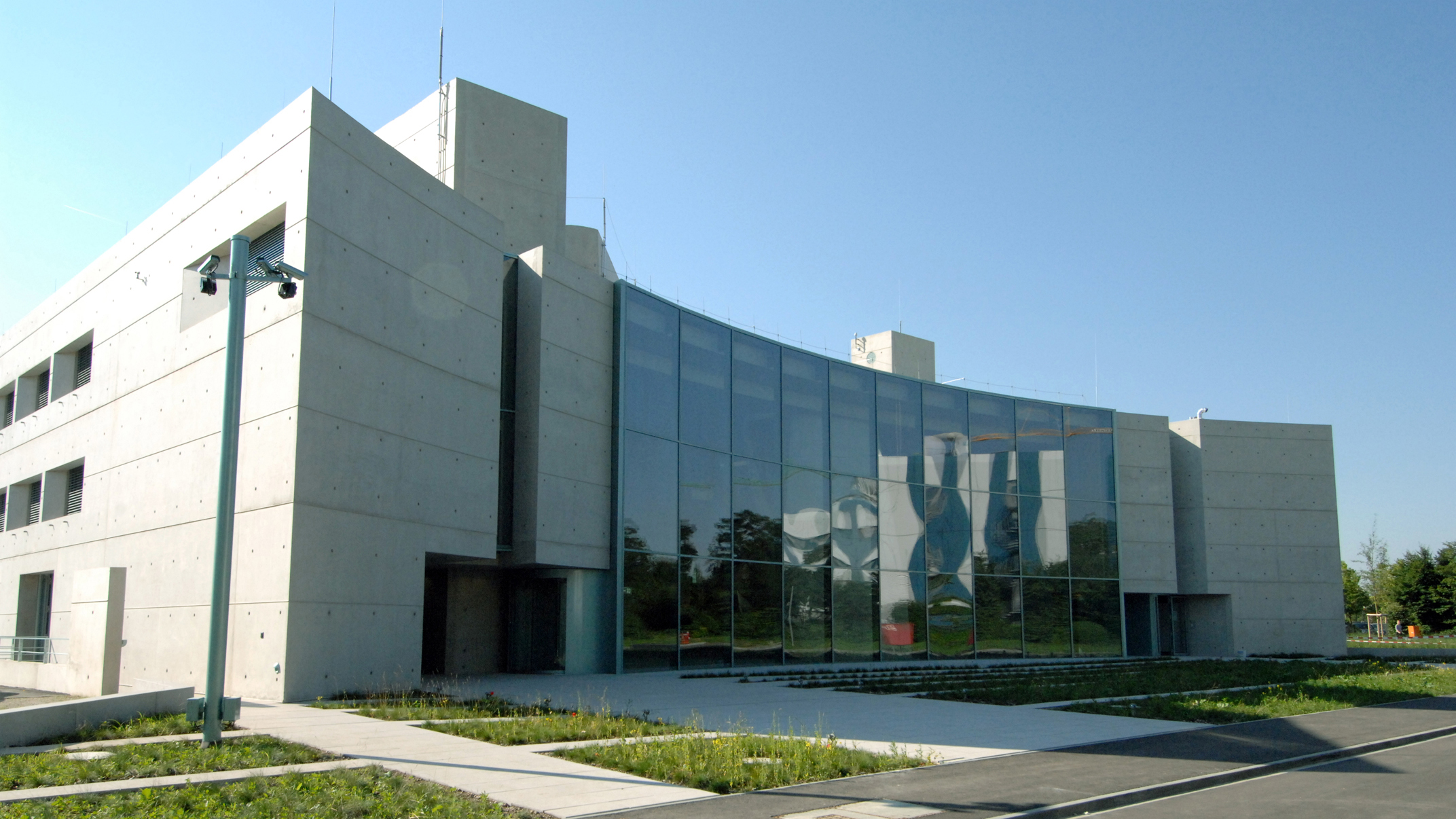
Galileo ground control center in Oberpfaffenhofen
