= Philipp von Taube =

German footballer (born 2009)

Personal information
- Date of birth: 4 May 2009 (age 17)
- Place of birth: Stuttgart, Germany
- Height: 1.91 m (6 ft 3 in)
- Positions: Forward; attacking midfielder

Team information
- Current team: Bayern Munich II

Youth career
- –2018: 1860 Munich
- 2019–: Bayern Munich

Senior career*
Years	Team	Apps	(Gls)
2026–	Bayern Munich II	3	(0)
- * Club domestic league appearances and goals as of 24 July 2026

Philipp von Taube (born 4 May 2009) is a German professional footballer who plays as a forward and attacking midfielder for Regionalliga Bayern club Bayern Munich II.

== Club career ==
A youth product of 1860 Munich, he later joined the youth academy of Bundesliga giants Bayern Munich in 2019.

In early 2026, von Taube was called-up to train with the Bayern Munich first team by head coach Vincent Kompany, after having scored 17 goals in 21 matches with the Bayern Munich's under-17s.

He received his first call-up and made his professional debut with Bayern Munich II during the 2025–26 season on 30 April 2026, in a 4–0 away loss Regionalliga Bayern match against FV Illertissen, substituting Bajung Darboe at the second half. Eight days later, von Taube received his second call-up and made his first start with Bayern Munich II during a 1–1 home draw Regionalliga Bayern match against VfB Eichstätt, on 8 May.

In May 2026, he extended his contract with Bayern Munich, along with seven other highly regarded FC Bayern Campus players, including Leopold Schmid and Oluwaseyi Wilson.

== Personal life ==
Born in Stuttgart, Germany, he is a descendant of the ancient Baltic-German noble Taube family lineage, being related to the late countess Hedvig Taube, among others.

== Career statistics ==
As of match played 24 July 2026

Appearances and goals by club, season and competition
Club	Season	League			Cup		Total			
Club	Season	Division	Apps	Goals	Apps	Goals	Apps	Goals		
Bayern Munich II	2025–26	Regionalliga Bayern	2	0	—		2	0		
Bayern Munich II	2026–27	Regionalliga Bayern	1	0	—		—		1	0
Bayern Munich II	Total		3	0	—		3	0		
Career Total			3	0	0	0	3	0		
