= Mausinsel =

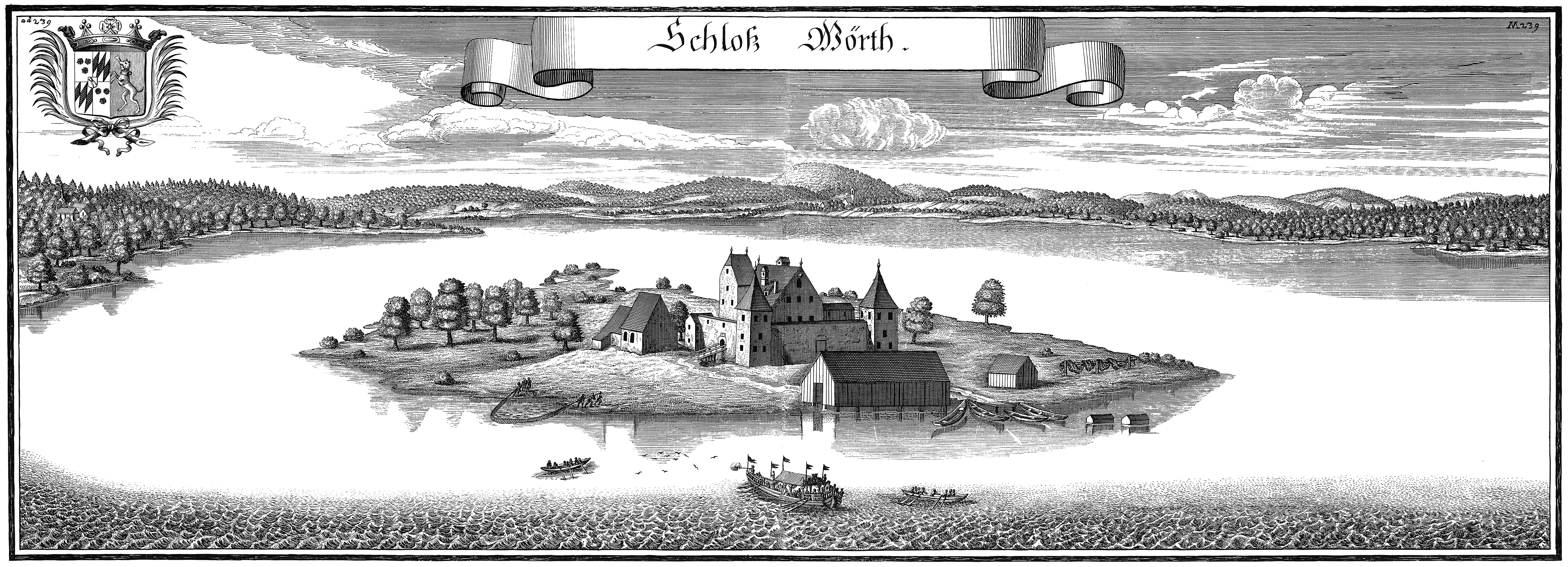
- Copper engraving of the Wörthschlössl on the Wörth island by Michael Wening in 1700

- Location within Bavaria

Geography
- Coordinates: 48.058611°N 11.171111°E
- Adjacent to: Wörthsee

Administration
- Germany
- State: Bavaria
- Region: Upper Bavaria
- District: Starnberg

Mausinsel ("Mouse island", also called Wörth) is an island in the Wörthsee lake in Bavaria. It contains the Wörthschlössl, a castle.

== Location ==
Mausinsel lies in the west of the Wörthsee lake, and is connected to the mainland by a causeway. The highest point on the island is 567 metres (1,860 ft) above sea level. The lake has a mean water level of 560.4 metres (1,839 ft) above sea level. The island is separated from the lake shore only by a narrow channel running through marshy land. The lake is 3.7 by 1.66 kilometres (2.30 by 1.03 mi), with an area of 4.34 square kilometres (1.68 sq mi).

== Legend of the name ==
The island takes its name from an old legend. Many years ago a rich but hard-hearted count owned the island. During a time of famine, some peasants came to ask him for food. He had them herded into a barn, which was set on fire. When the wailing of the dying peasants died down, the count said "do you hear that whimpering of rats and mice? Soon these pests will be exterminated." The count rode back to his castle, which was invaded by a swarm of rats and mice that even stole the food from his plate. He fled to the island, but they followed him there and ate him alive. They then disappeared.

== Castle ==
The Wörthschlössl was originally a fortified manor house, built in 1446. Later it became the summer residence of the Count of Toerring. The castle is privately owned and is not open to the public.

== Gallery ==
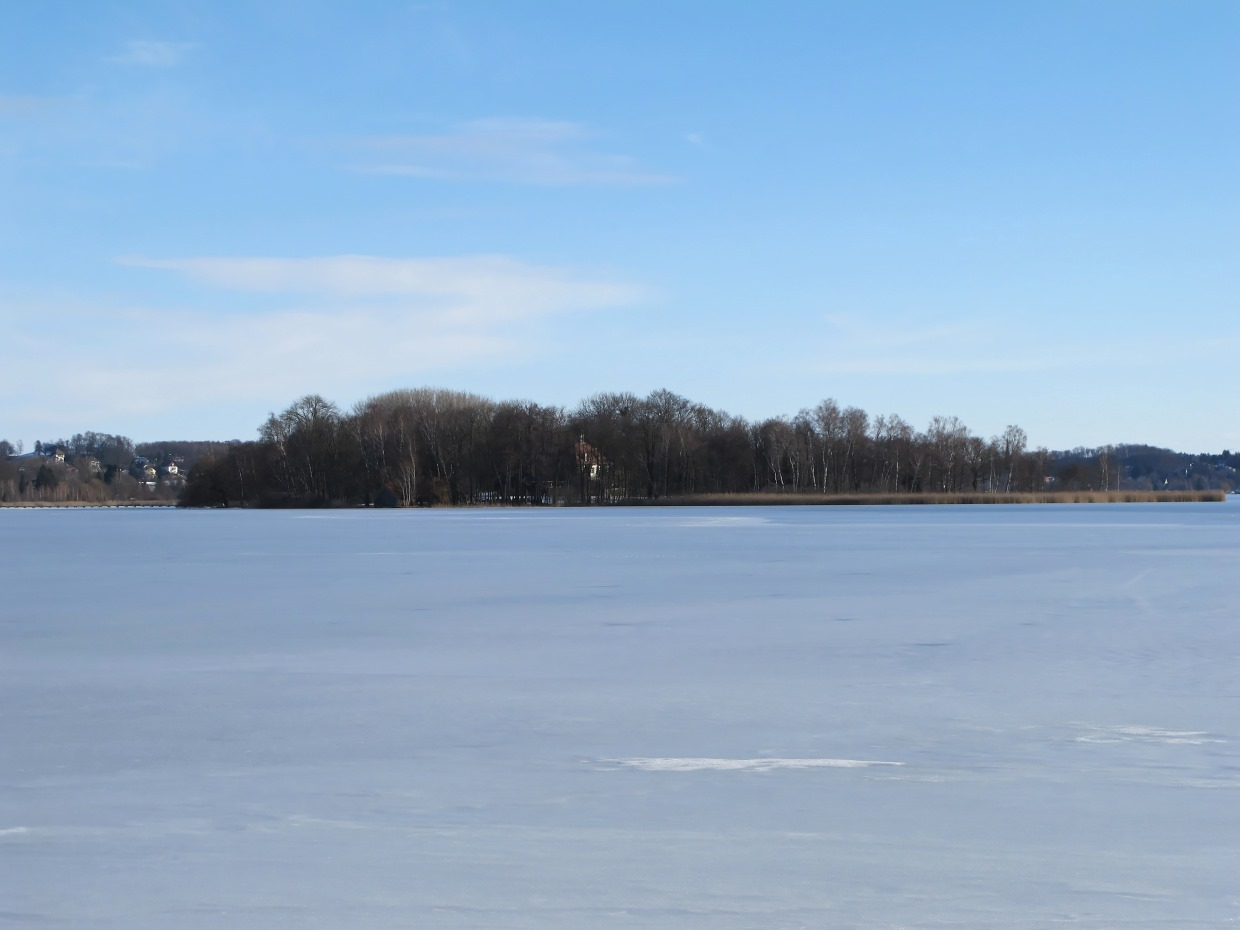
Mausinsel in winter (February 2010)

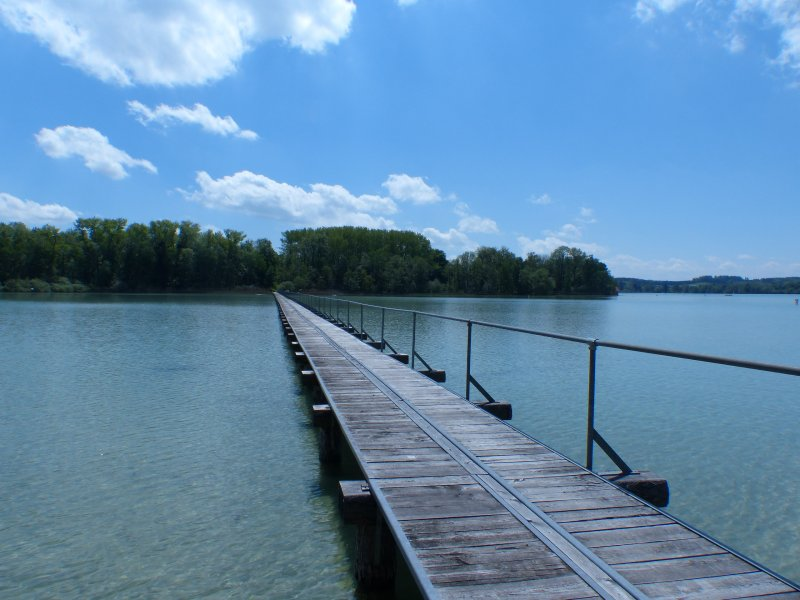
Causeway leading to Mausinsel
