= Starnberg (district) =

Coordinates: 48°00′N 11°20′E

- District
- Flag Coat of arms
- Country: Germany
- State: Bavaria
- Adm. region: Upper Bavaria
- Capital: Starnberg

Government
  - District admin.: Stefan Frey (CSU)

Area
  - Total: 488.01 km^{2} (188.42 sq mi)

Population (31 December 2024)
  - Total: 139,329
  - Density: 290/km^{2} (740/sq mi)
- Time zone: UTC+01:00 (CET)
  - Summer (DST): UTC+02:00 (CEST)
- Vehicle registration: STA
- Website: https://www.lk-starnberg.de

Starnberg (German pronunciation: [ˈʃtaʁnbɛʁk]) is a Landkreis (district) in the southern part of Bavaria, Germany. Neighboring districts are (from the north clockwise) Fürstenfeldbruck, Munich, Bad Tölz-Wolfratshausen, Weilheim-Schongau and Landsberg.

Starnberg district and the Hochtaunuskreis regularly compete for the title of Germany's wealthiest district.

== Geography ==
The main geographic feature of the district are the five lakes – the Starnberger See and Ammersee, as well as the smaller Weßlinger See, Wörthsee and Pilsensee. The lakes were formed by the glaciers of the last ice age. Hence the district is also called Fünf-Seen-Land (five-lake county).

== History ==
The district was created in 1902, when the Bezirksamt München II was dissolved, and the new Bezirksamt Starnberg and Bezirksamt Wolfratshausen were created. Starting in 1939 they were called Landkreis. In 1972 two municipalities (Bachhausen and Höhenrain) from the district Wolfratshausen were added to the district. In the 1978 communal reform the previously 42 municipalities were merged into the current 14 ones.

== Partnerships ==
Since 1982 the district has a partnership with the district Bad Dürkheim in Rhineland-Palatinate. Since 1981 it also has a partnership with the Taipei County (now New Taipei City), which developed after a delegation of parachutists from Taiwan stayed in Starnberg for the 1980 parachuting world championship in Altenstadt/Schongau.

== Coat of arms ==
The coat of arms show the Bavarian diamonds in the background, with a yellow lion and eagle in front. The two animals were the symbol of the Counts of Andechs-Meranien, who ruled the area until 1248.

== Towns and municipalities ==
Clickable map of towns and municipalities in the district

Towns
1. Starnberg
Municipalities
1. Andechs
2. Berg
3. Feldafing
4. Gauting
5. Gilching
6. Herrsching (Ammersee)

7. Inning am Ammersee
8. Krailling
9. Pöcking
10. Seefeld
11. Tutzing
12. Weßling
13. Wörthsee
