= Fünfseenland =

Region in Upper Bavaria

The Fünfseenland (German pronunciation: [ˈfʏnfzeːənˌlant], lit. 'Land of Five Lakes') is the name for an area in Upper Bavaria between, and including, the Ammersee and Starnberger See, which contains the remainder of the great glacial lakes of the area (Pilsensee, Wörthsee, and the Weßlinger See).

== Gallery ==
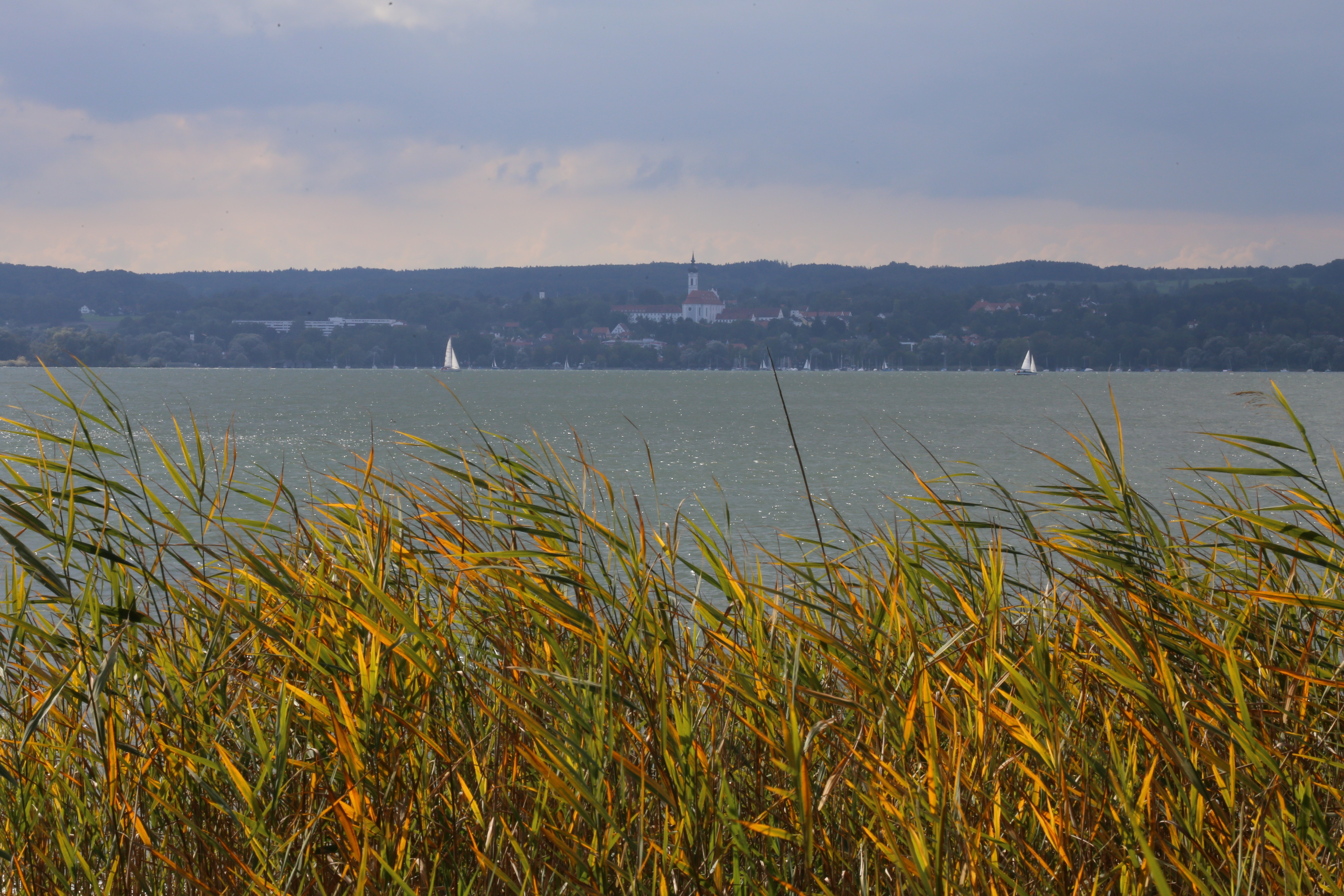
Ammersee

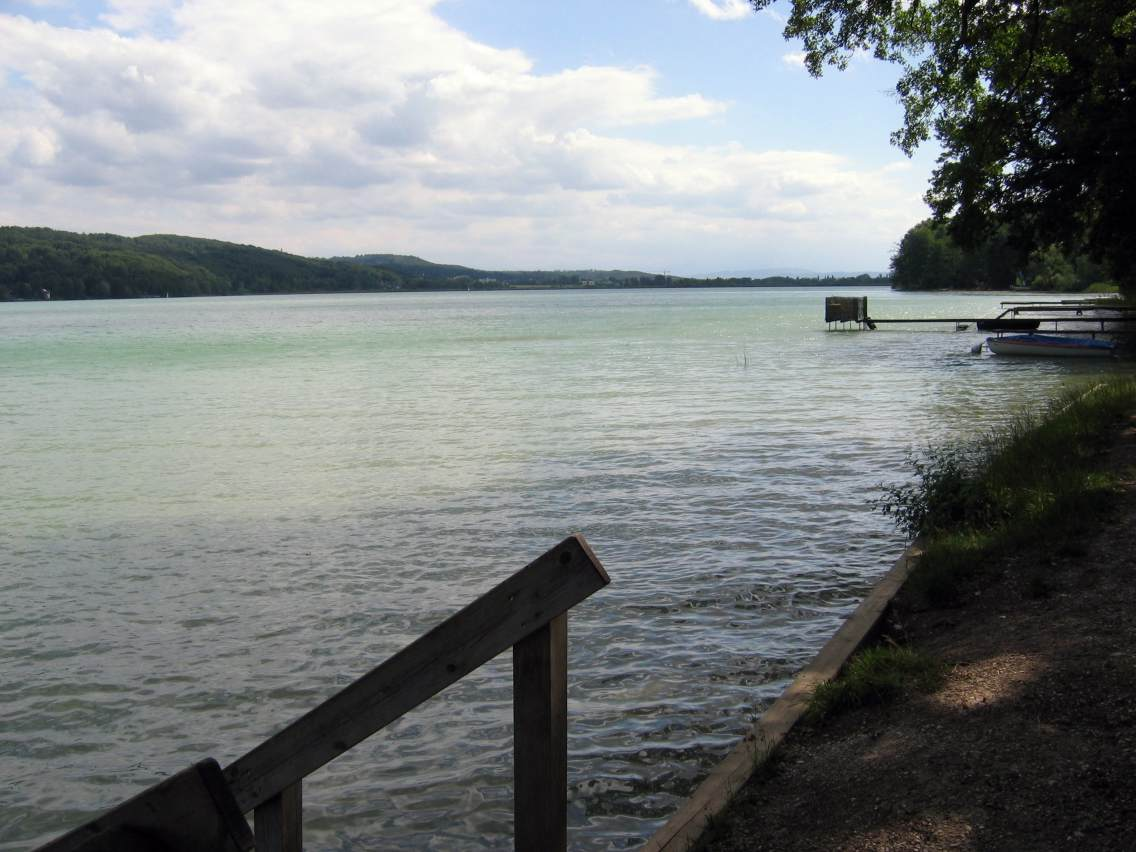
Pilsensee

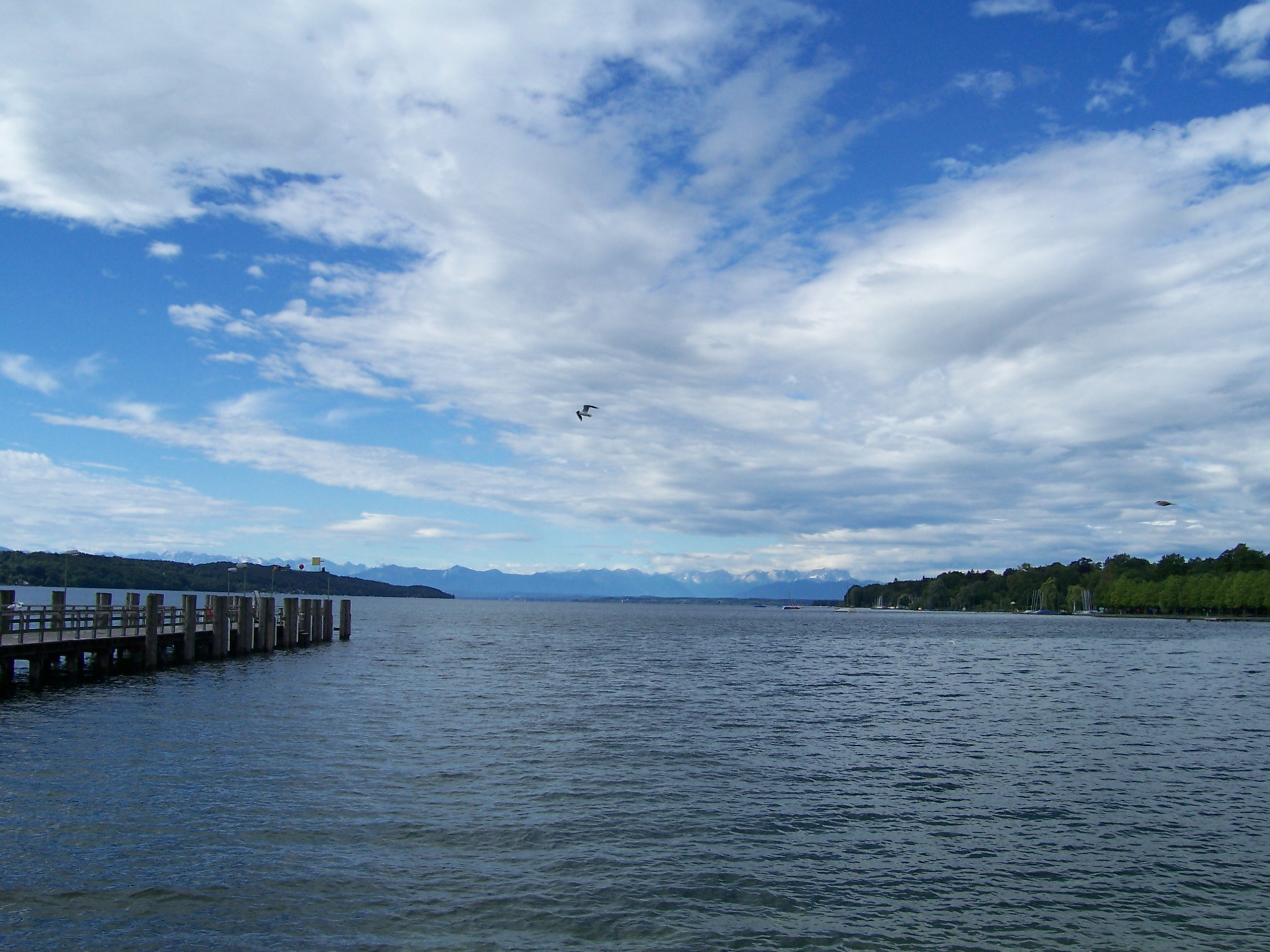
Starnberger See

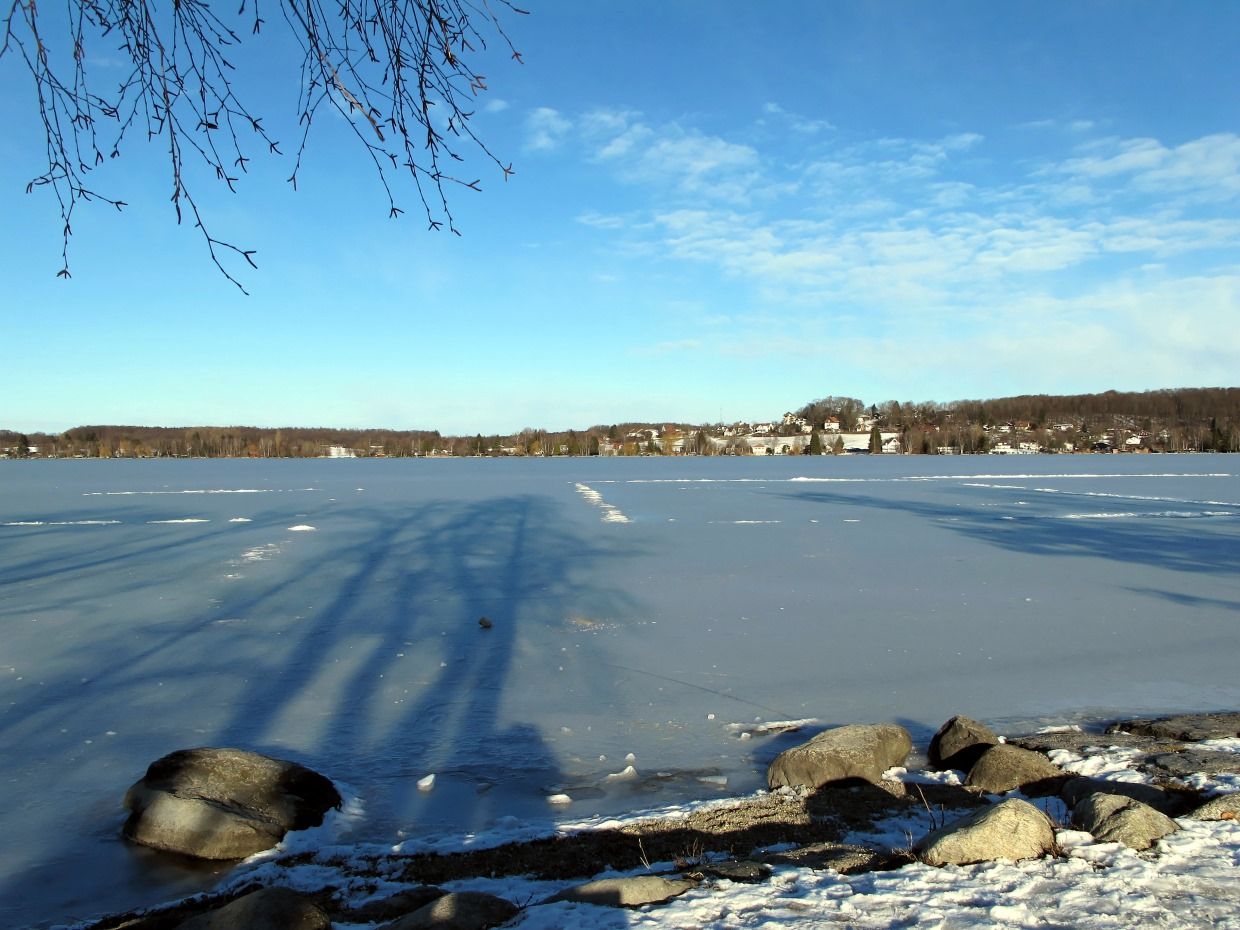
Wörthsee

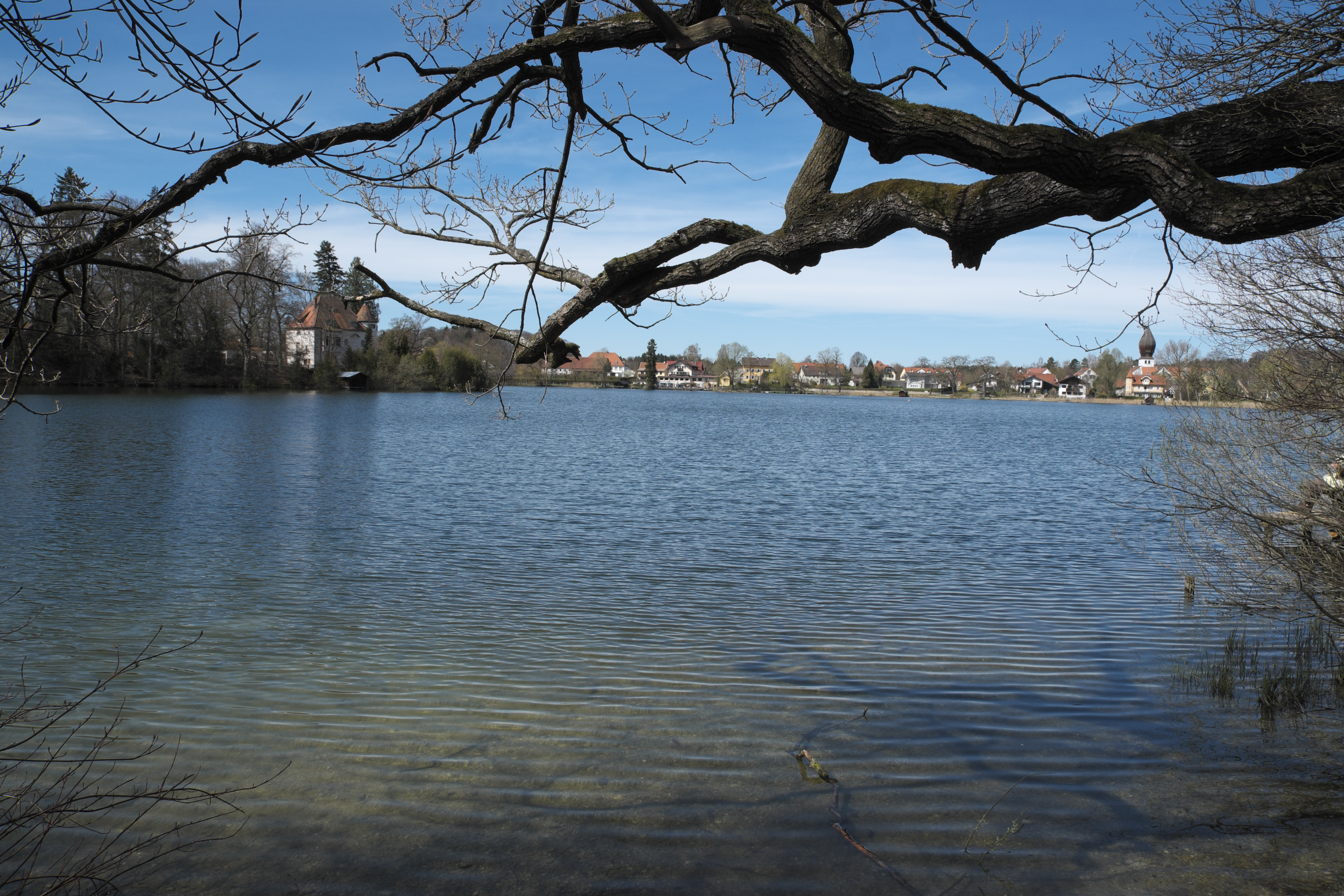
Weßlinger See

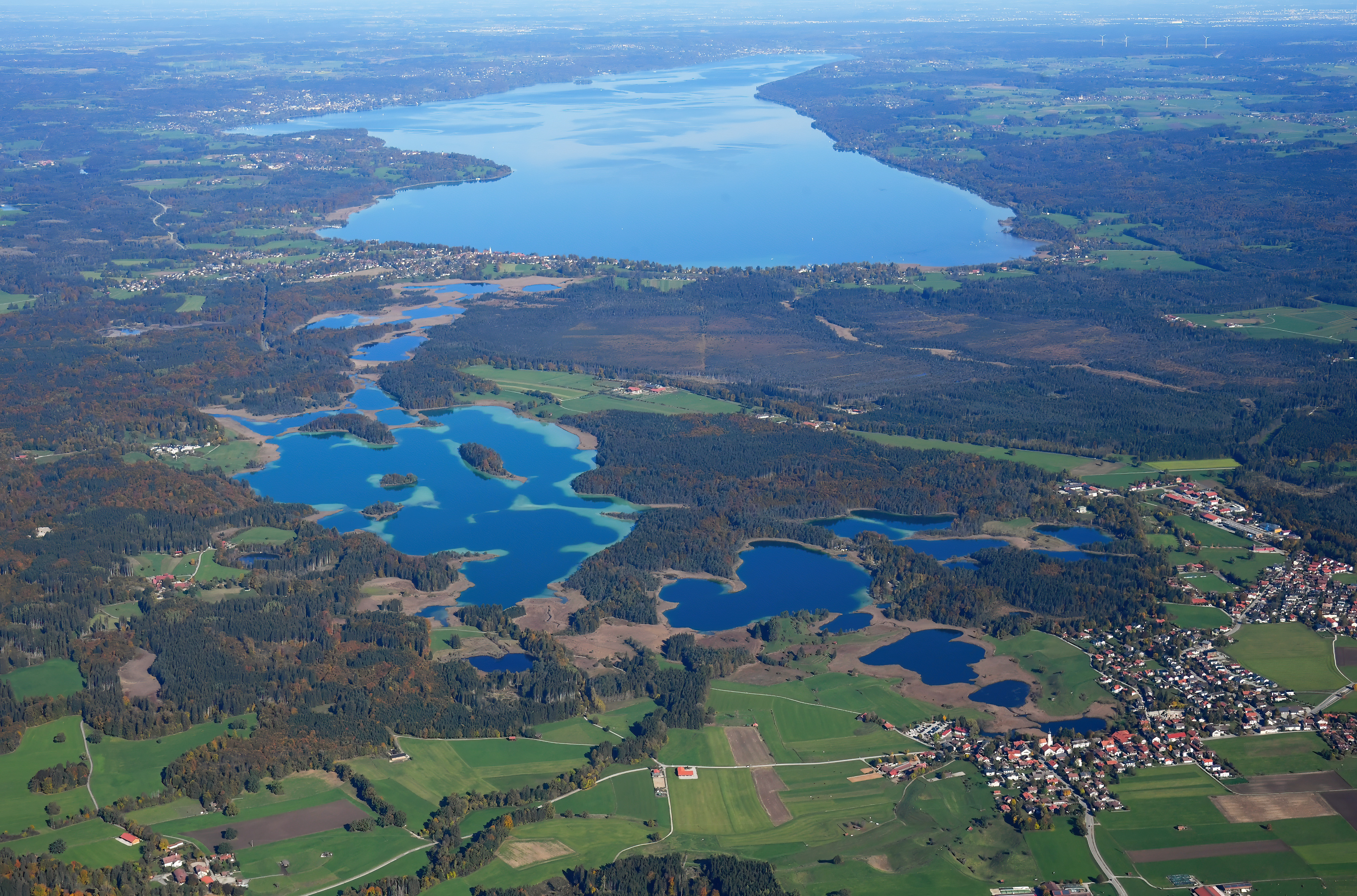
Osterseen

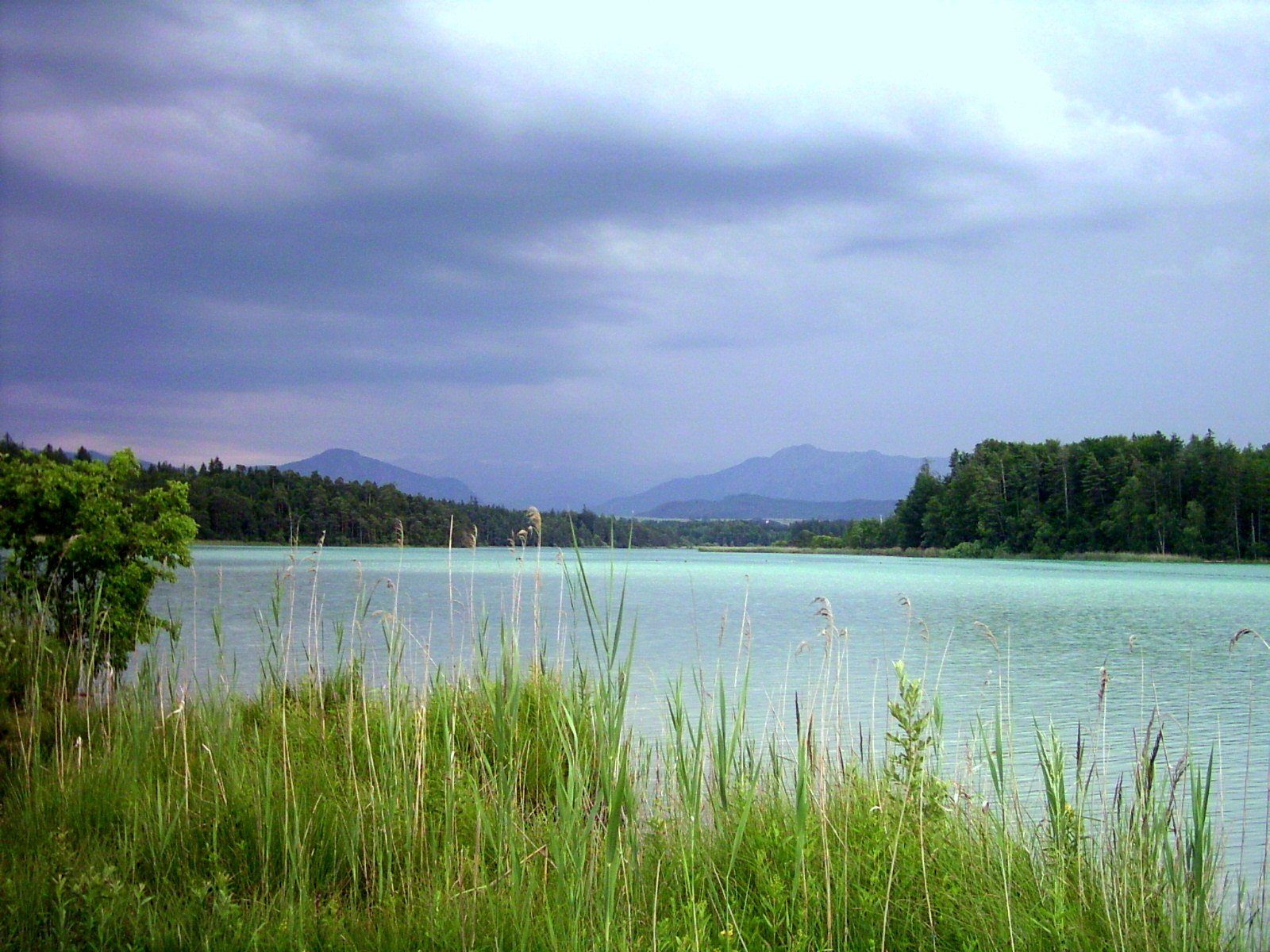
The big Ostersee

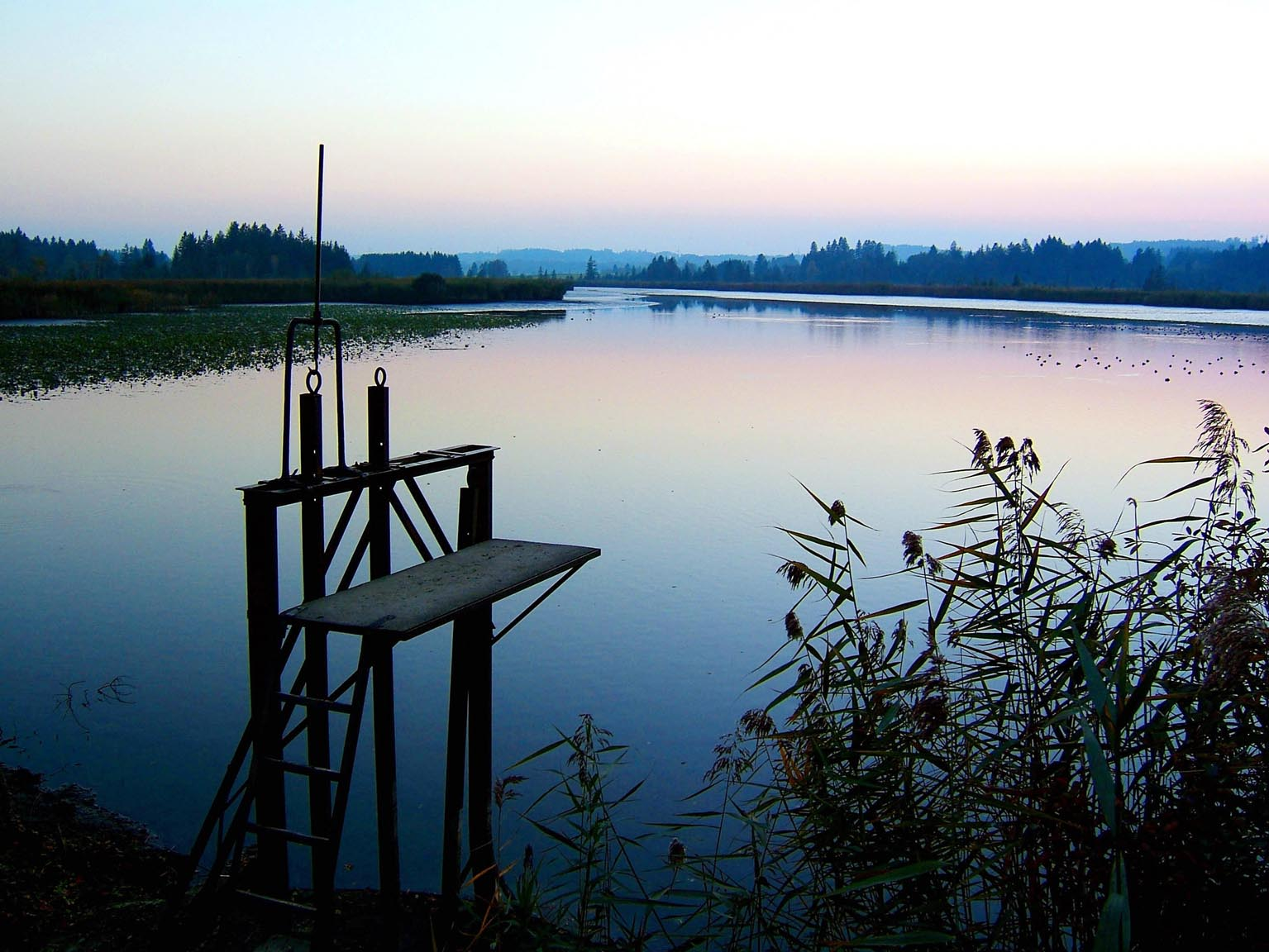
Maisinger See
