= Wörthsee (municipality) =

- Municipality
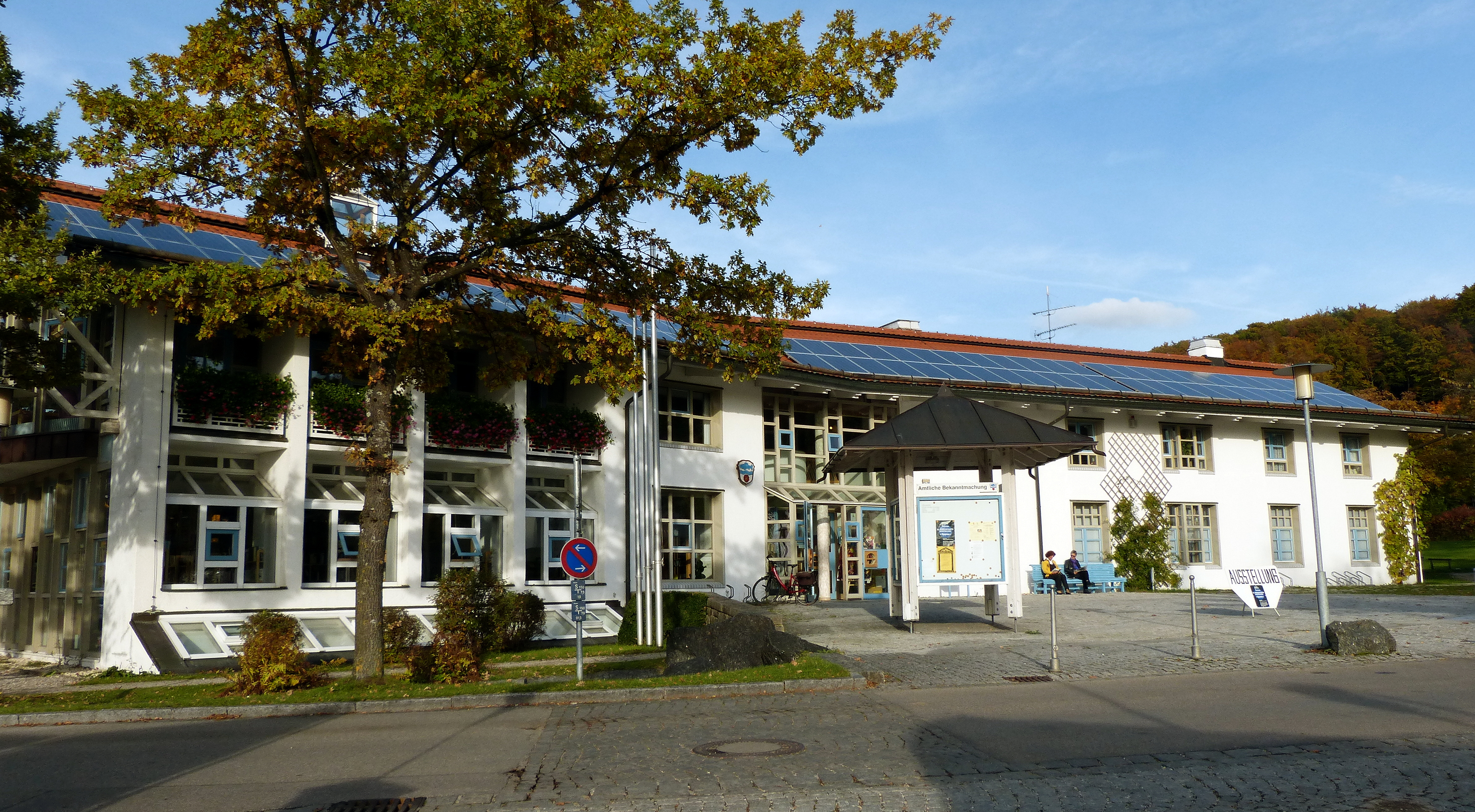
- Town hall

- Coat of arms

- Location of Wörthsee within Starnberg district
- Interactive map of Wörthsee
- Location within Germany Location within Bavaria
- Coordinates: 48°05′N 11°12′E
- Country: Germany
- State: Bavaria
- Admin. region: Oberbayern
- District: Starnberg

Government
  - Mayor (2020–26): Christel Muggenthal

Area
  - Total: 20.42 km^{2} (7.88 sq mi)
- Elevation: 560–620 m (1,840–2,030 ft)

Population (2025-12-31)
  - Total: 5,288
  - Density: 259.0/km^{2} (670.7/sq mi)
- Time zone: UTC+01:00 (CET)
  - Summer (DST): UTC+02:00 (CEST)
- Postal codes: 82237
- Dialling codes: 08153, 08143
- Vehicle registration: STA
- Website: www.gemeinde-woerthsee.de

Wörthsee (German pronunciation: [ˈvœʁtˌzeː]) is a municipality in the district of Starnberg in Bavaria, Germany. It is located on the northeastern shore of the lake called Wörthsee, and is about 15 kilometers northwest of the county town of Starnberg.
