= Inning am Ammersee =

- Municipality
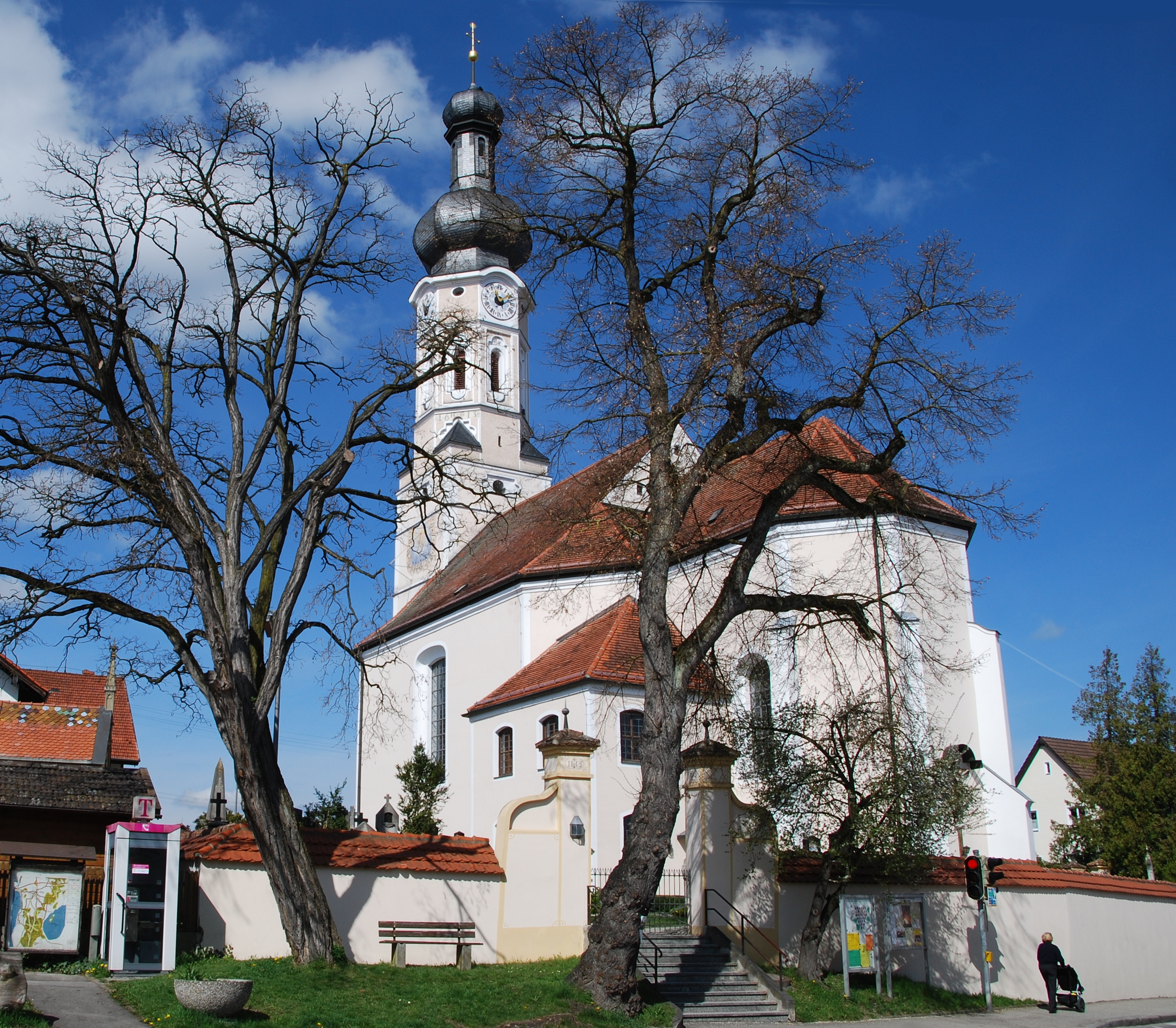
- Church of Saint John the Baptist

- Coat of arms

- Location of Inning am Ammersee within Starnberg district
- Interactive map of Inning am Ammersee
- Location within Germany Location within Bavaria
- Coordinates: 48°04′N 11°09′E
- Country: Germany
- State: Bavaria
- Admin. region: Oberbayern
- District: Starnberg
- Subdivisions: 6 Ortsteile

Government
  - Mayor (2020–26): Walter Bleimaier (CSU)

Area
  - Total: 24.42 km^{2} (9.43 sq mi)
- Elevation: 553 m (1,814 ft)

Population (2025-12-31)
  - Total: 4,801
  - Density: 196.6/km^{2} (509.2/sq mi)
- Time zone: UTC+01:00 (CET)
  - Summer (DST): UTC+02:00 (CEST)
- Postal codes: 82266
- Dialling codes: 08143
- Vehicle registration: STA
- Website: www.inning.de

Inning am Ammersee (German pronunciation: [ˈɪnɪŋ ʔam ˈʔamɐˌzeː], lit. 'Inning on the Ammersee') is a municipality in Bavaria, Germany, in the district of Starnberg, in the Regierungsbezirk of Oberbayern. It lies on the shores of lake Ammersee.

== Notable people ==
- Jan Marschalkowski (born 2002), racing driver
- Helene Fischer (born 1984), singer
