= Weßlinger See =

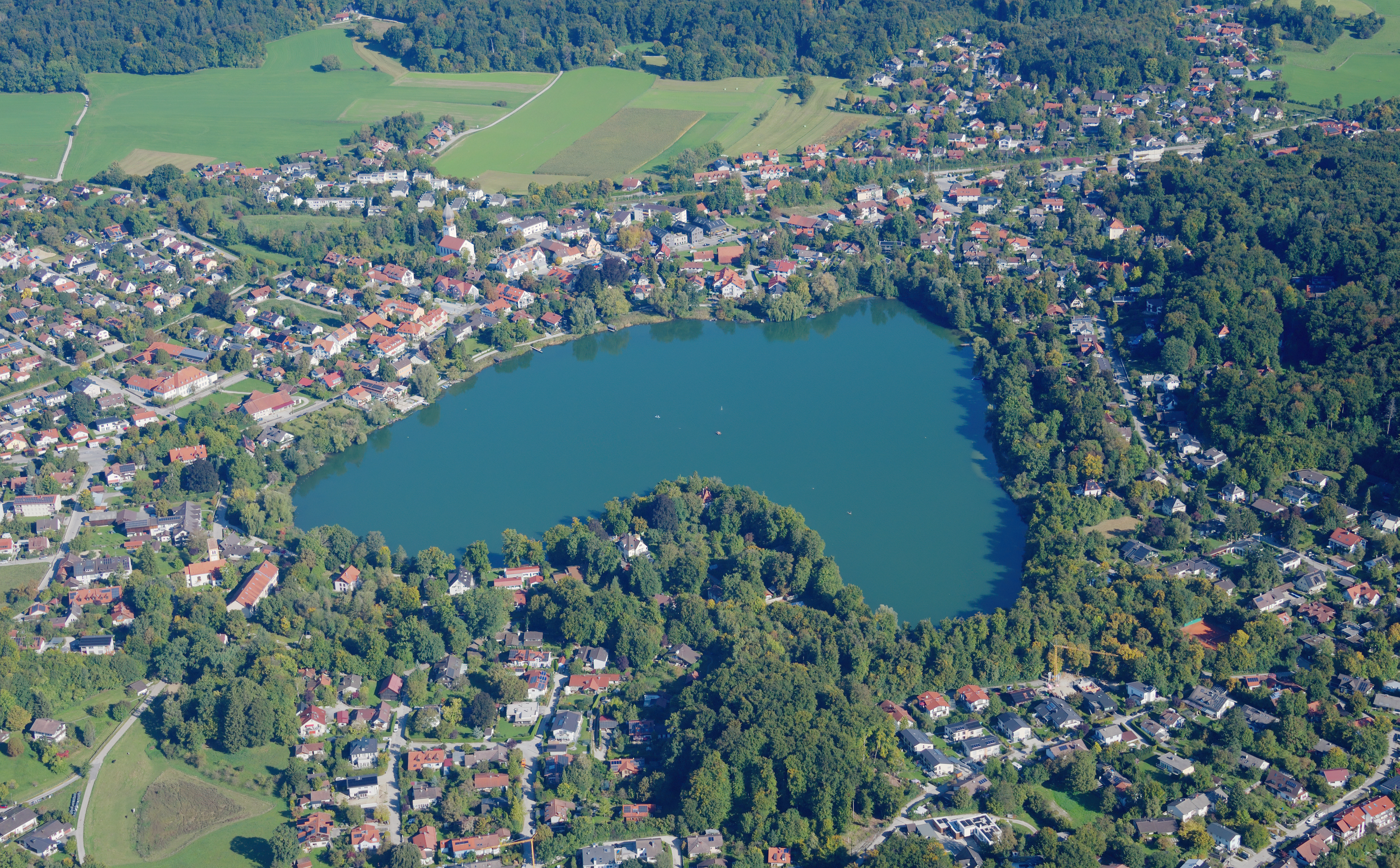

- Location within Bavaria

- Location: Starnberg district of Bavaria
- Coordinates: 48°4′28″N 11°15′3″E
- Type: Glacial lake
- Catchment area: 1.4 square kilometres (0.54 sq mi)
- Basin countries: Germany
- Max. length: 0.70 kilometres (0.43 mi)
- Max. width: 0.24 kilometres (0.15 mi)
- Surface area: 0.17 square kilometres (0.066 sq mi)
- Average depth: 7 metres (23 ft)
- Max. depth: 12 metres (39 ft)
- Water volume: 1,047,000 cubic metres (37,000,000 cu ft)
- Surface elevation: 590 metres (1,940 ft)

The Weßlinger See (lit. 'Lake Weßling') is the smallest lake in the Fünfseenland (lit. 'five lakes country') in Upper Bavaria. It is completely enclosed by the municipality of Weßling.

== Overview ==
Lake Weßling is a remnant of a kettle hole created during the Würm glaciation. It has no natural tributary, and due to the use of fertilizers in the catchment area it was close to becoming hypoxic in the 20th century. To counter this problem an oxygen pump was installed in the middle of the lake in the 1970s, which has significantly improved the ecologic balance.

Due to its small size and lack of a natural tributary, regionally it is usually one of the warmest lakes in summer and the first lake to freeze over in winter. Especially in summer this means the lake attracts numerous visitors from the Munich Metropolitan Region. Starting in the 19th century, the scenic setting within the Bavarian Alpine Foreland has also attracted several painters and sculptors (e.g. Carl Schuch, Pierre-Auguste Renoir, Wilhelm Trübner, see Gallery) to the town of Weßling

== Gallery ==
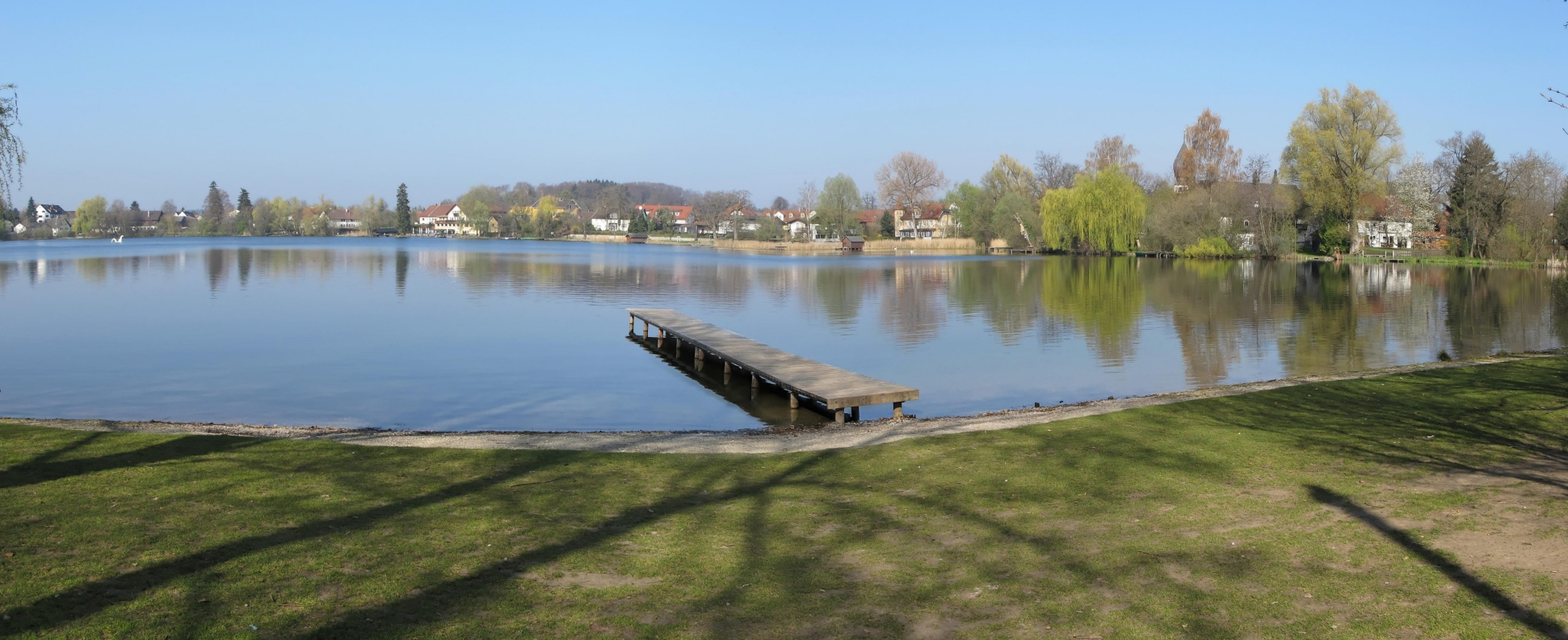
View of Lake Weßling

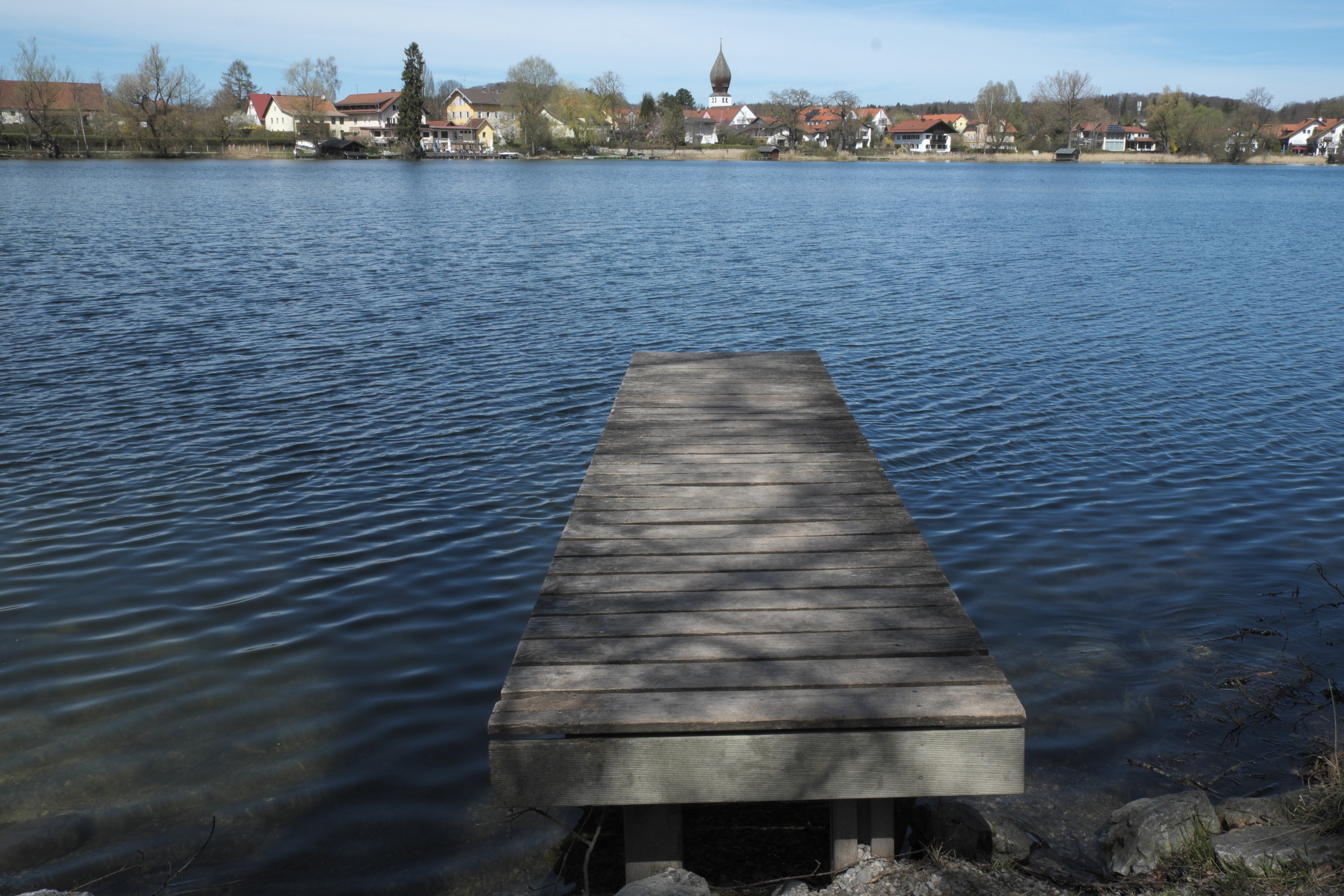
Berth at Lake Weßling

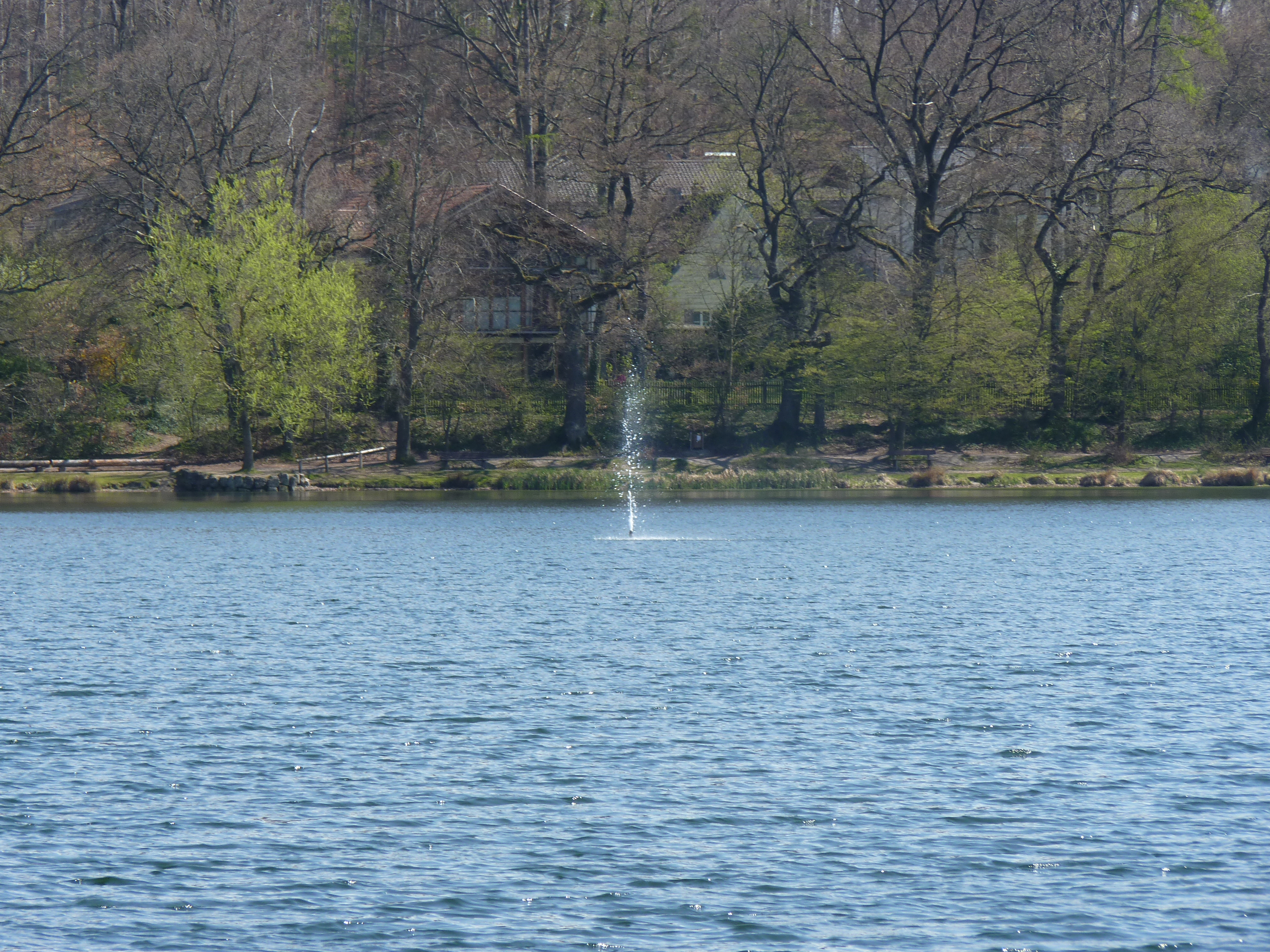
Water fountain caused by oxygen pump

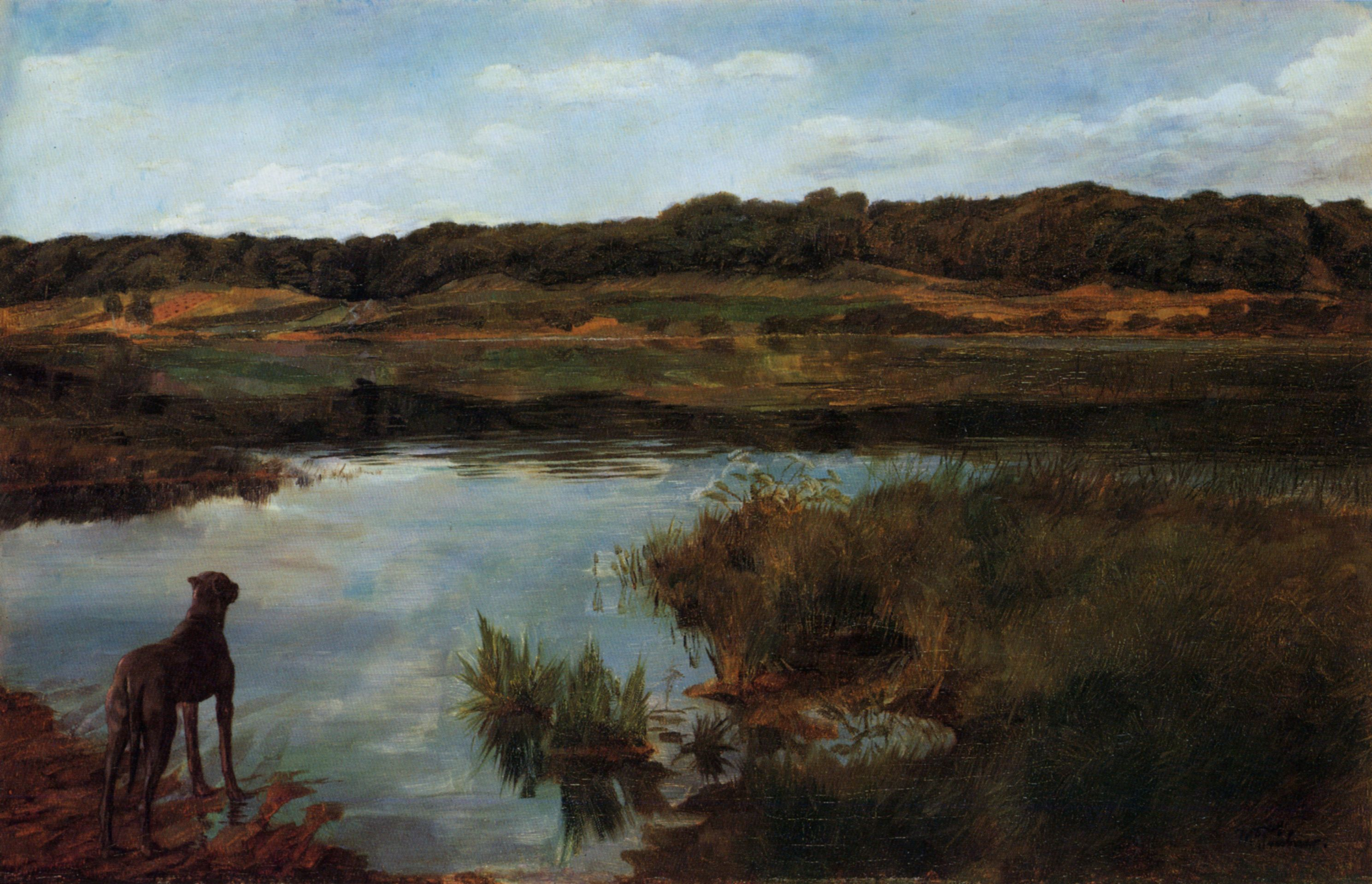
Lake Weßling painted by Wilhelm Trübner

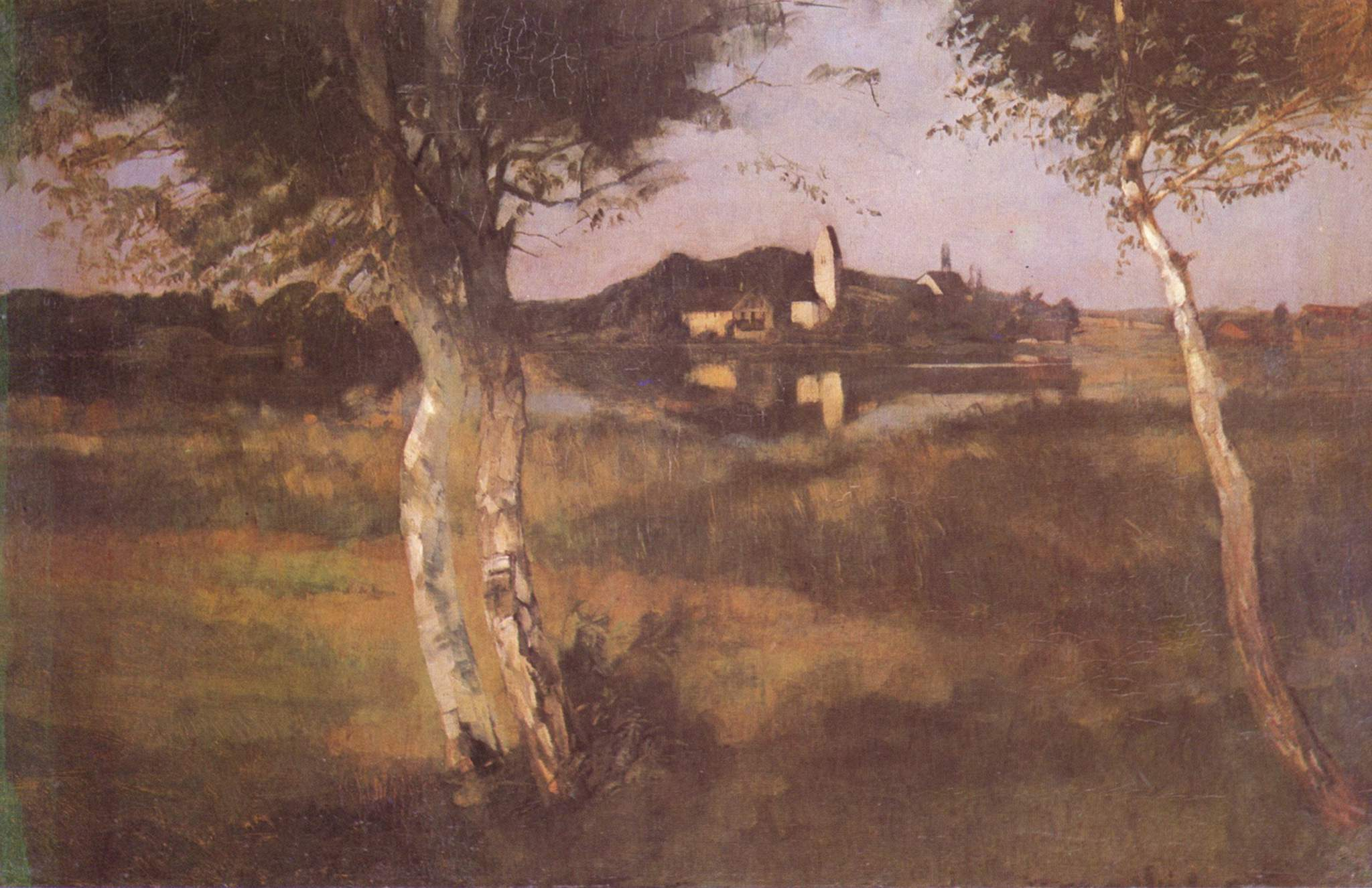
Lake Weßling painted by Carl Schuch

== See also ==
- List of lakes in Bavaria
