= Pilsensee =

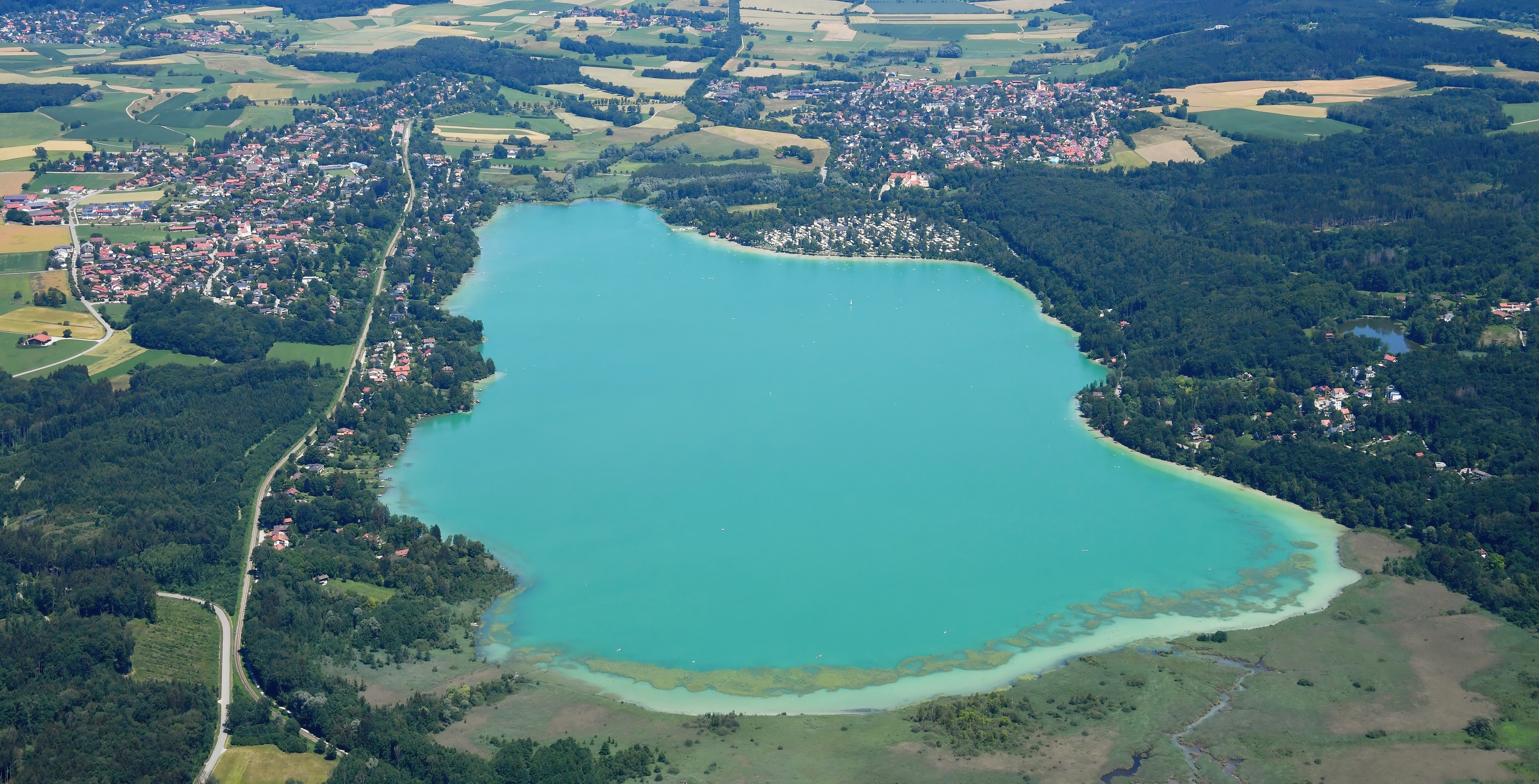

- Location within Bavaria
- Location: Oberbayern, Bavaria
- Coordinates: 48°1′31″N 11°11′17″E
- Basin countries: Germany
- Max. length: 2.55 km (1.58 mi)
- Max. width: 0.76 km (0.47 mi)
- Surface area: 1.95 km^{2} (0.75 sq mi)
- Max. depth: 17.1 m (56 ft)
- Water volume: 18,095,000 m^{3} (639,000,000 cu ft)
- Shore length^{1}: 6.5 km (4.0 mi)
- Surface elevation: 534 m (1,752 ft)
- ^{1} Shore length is not a well-defined measure.

Pilsensee is a lake in Oberbayern, Bavaria, Germany. At an elevation of 534 m, its surface area is 1.95 km^{2}.
