= List of Bavarian noble families =

This List of Bavarian noble families contains all 338 Bavarian aristocratic families named in 1605 by Siebmacher as well as further additions.

The list is an alphabetical overview of Bavarian nobility. It contains information about name variants, ancestry, extent and well-known personalities of the line. Where no coat of arms is available, the file position from Siebmacher's 1605 Book of Coats of Arms is given as follows: page number of the coat of arms plate and position of the coat of arms on the plate (the page numbers of reprints are not used).

== A ==
Name	Period	Seat/Origin Canton Remarks	Personalities	Coat of arms	
Abensberg		Abensberg			
Adelzhausen; Adelshausen		Adelzhausen, Unterweikertshofen Castle			
Adelshofen		Adelshofen		Siebmacher 1605:82,8	
Aham (Ahalm) zu Wildenau		Ahaim		Siebmacher 1605:77,11	
Albrechtsheim		Albrechtsheim		Siebmacher 1605:81,7	
Allerspach		Allerspach		Siebmacher 1605:80,13	
Alnbach		Alnbach		Siebmacher 1605:83,15	[Princes von Altenstadt-Oettingen]
House of Altmann von Regeldorf		The Altmanns of Regeldorf		Siebmacher 1605:95,14	
House of Altmann von Vilswert		The Altmanns of Vilswert		Siebmacher 1605:95,12	
Amsheim		Amsheim		Siebmacher 1605:85,5	
House of Andechs		Andechs			
House of Armansperg		Armansberg or Arnsberg		Siebmacher 1605:80,4	
Arnolt		Arnolt		Siebmacher 1605:98,4	
Asch		Asch Castle		Siebmacher 1605:81,9	
House of Auer von Auberg		The Auers of Auberg		Siebmacher 1605:90,1	
House of Auer von Pullach		The Auers of Puelach		Siebmacher 1605:80,3	
House of Auer von Tobel		The Auers of Tobel		Siebmacher 1605:80,7	
House of Auer von Winckel		The Auers of Winckel		Siebmacher 1605:80,9	
Aurach		Aürach		Siebmacher 1605:94,2	
Aurberg		Aurberg		Siebmacher 1605:81,11	
Aycher von Herngiesdorf		The Aygners of Herngiesdorf		Siebmacher 1605:97,15	

== B ==
Name	Period	Seat/Origins Canton Remarks	Personalities	Coat of arms
Bart zu Koppenhausen		The Bärtts of Kopenhausen		Siebmacher 1605:83,13
Baurenfreund		Baurenfreund		Siebmacher 1605:89,12
Baymundt		Baymundt		Siebmacher 1605:99,3
Behaim von Abensberg	1120-vor 1681	Village of Behaim bei Moosburg, Abensberg, Freising		
House of Beheim von Adelshausen; Behem von Adelzhausen; Pehaim von Adelshausen; Beheim von Bernhardswald (second line)	?-Mitte 16. Jh.	Adelshausen Castle (mentioned in Bohemian Sachselhauer)		Siebmacher 1605:93,7
Berchtoltzhofen (Beroltzhofen)		Berchtoltzhofen		Siebmacher 1605:80,1
Berwang		Bergwang		Siebmacher 1605:83,6
Betzenstein		Betzenstein		Siebmacher 1605:89,13
Blankfels		Blanckenfels		Siebmacher 1605:96,2
Blittersdorf (Plitersdorf)		Plitersdorf		Siebmacher 1605:97,14
Braidenbach		Braidenpach		Siebmacher 1605:80,6
Breitenstein; Braidenstein	?-1644	Breitenstein, Hetzles		
Brandt		Brandt		Siebmacher 1605:89,7
Brielmayer		Brielmayer		Siebmacher 1605:97,3
Breitenbuch		Breitenbuch	Breitenbuch ?	Siebmacher 1605:94,7
Bülling		Bülling		Siebmacher 1605:82,6

== C ==
Name	Period	Seat/Origins Canton Remarks	Personalities	Coat of arms
Cammer		The Cammers		Siebmacher 1605:91,7
Cassel		Cassel		Siebmacher 1605:92,12
House of Castner von Schandebach		The Castners of Schnadebach		Siebmacher 1605:99,5
Closen	bis 1856	Closen; Seat in Arnstorf in Lower Bavaria and in Gern near Eggenfelden	Wolfgang von Closen, bishop	

== D ==
Name	Period	Seat/Origins Canton Remarks	Personalities	Coat of arms
Dabertzhofen		Dabertzhofen		Siebmacher 1605:90,5
Dachsperg		Dachsperger		Siebmacher 1605:93,10
				Siebmacher 1605:93,12
Doles von Rosenberg		The Doles of Rosenberg		Siebmacher 1605:89,15
Doneckh		Doneckh		Siebmacher 1605:96,6
Donnerstein		Donnerstein		Siebmacher 1605:83,12
Dortzer		The Dortzer		Siebmacher 1605:94,4
Dreschwitz (Draschwitz)		Dreschwitz		Siebmacher 1605:92,1
Düchtel		The Düchtels of Dützing		Siebmacher 1605:83,5
Dumperg		Dumperg		Siebmacher 1605:97,6

== E ==
Name	Period	Seat/Origins Canton Remarks	Personalities	Coat of arms
Eberspach		Eberspach		Siebmacher 1605:92,7
Ebron von Wildenberg		The Ebrons of Wildenberg		Siebmacher 1605:78,6
Edelbeck (also called Edlweck)		Called "zu Schonau" ("of Schonau"), seat at Garsensee		Siebmacher 1605:98,6
Egk		Egk		Siebmacher 1605:81,2
Egk		Egk		Siebmacher 1605:81,3
Egk (Eckher)		The Egkhers		Siebmacher 1605:78,3
Egkher von Paering		The Egkhers of Paering		Siebmacher 1605:87,3
Ehrenbeck		Ehrenbeck		Siebmacher 1605:57,4
Elriching		Elriching		Siebmacher 1605:86,2
Elsenbeck		Elsenbeck		Siebmacher 1605:97,7
Engelshofen		Engelshofen		Siebmacher 1605:97,8
Erlbach		Erlbach		Siebmacher 1605:95,6
Erlbeck zu Siningen		The Erlbeckens of Siningen		Siebmacher 1605:87,13
Eschelbach		Eschelpach		Siebmacher 1605:92,9
Eubing		Eybing		Siebmacher 1605:80,5
Eysen		Eysen		Siebmacher 1605:98,10
Eysenreich von Weilbach		The Eysenreichs		Siebmacher 1605:94,13

== F ==
Name	Period	Seat/Origins Canton Remarks	Personalities	Coat of arms
Falkenstein	1115-1272 (?)	Falkenstein		
Feuer von Au (Aw, Ow)		The Feuers of Au		Siebmacher 1605:85,15
Flitzing		Flitzzing		Siebmacher 1605:91,12
Florian		The Florianers		Siebmacher 1605:91,9
Floss		Floss		Siebmacher 1605:89,3
Franckenreiter	1605:123,14	The Franckenreiter		Siebmacher 1605:97,11
Franckenstein		Franckenstein		Siebmacher 1605:123,14
Franking		Fraengking		Siebmacher 1605:94,1
Fraunberg		Fraunberg		Siebmacher 1605:79,1
Freising		Freising		Siebmacher 1605:95,1
Freudenberg		Freidenberg		
Freyberg		Freyberg		Siebmacher 1605:83,9
House of Freyberg zu Aschau		Freyberg zu Aschau		Siebmacher 1605:78,2
House of Freymann auf Randeck		The Freymanns of Hohen Randeck		Siebmacher 1605:95,3
Fronberg		Fronberg		Siebmacher 1605:81,15
House of Fronheim zu Malching		The Fronheims of Malching		Siebmacher 1605:93,9
House of Fröschel von Martzel		The Fröschels of Martzel		Siebmacher 1605:81,6
Fuchsstein		Fuchsstein		Siebmacher 1605:93,14

== G ==
Name	Period	Seat/Origins Canton Remarks	Personalities	Coat of arms
Gabelkhoven		Gäbelthofen		Siebmacher 1605:86,10
Gartner		The Gartners		Siebmacher 1605:98,12
Gasmer		The Gasmers		Siebmacher 1605:99,8
Gebeck		Geebecken		Siebmacher 1605:86,1
Gibing		Gibing		Siebmacher 1605:98,9
Gieser		The Giesers		Siebmacher 1605:86,3
Gmainer		The Gmainers		Siebmacher 1605:85,6
Goldacker		The Goldackers		Siebmacher 1605:87,7
Göltling		The Göltlings		Siebmacher 1605:92,13
Gradl von Boden		The Gradels of Boden		Siebmacher 1605:98,15
Gransey von Uttendorf		The Granseys of Uttendorf		Siebmacher 1605:91,14
Gravenreuth		Gravenreuth		Siebmacher 1605:95,10
Gruber von Grub		The Grubers of Grub		Siebmacher 1605:86,8
Gruber von Peterskirch		The Grubers of Peterskirch		Siebmacher 1605:85,14

== H ==
Name	Period	Seat/Origins Canton Remarks	Personalities	Coat of arms
Häckel zu der Altenstat		The Hackels of Altenstat		Siebmacher 1605:95,7
Häckelöder		The Häckelöders		Siebmacher 1605:86,6
Halder		The Halters		Siebmacher 1605:88,12
Haller		The Hallers		Siebmacher 1605:98,5
Hals Kamm-Hals	1112- 1375	The counts of Hals; the present ruins of Hals Castle, in the town quarter of the same name in Passau was their seat.		
Haslang		Haslang		Siebmacher 1605:77,15
Hausner von Treusa		The Hausners of Treusa		Siebmacher 1605:79,10
Hautzenberg		Hautzenberg		Siebmacher 1605:83,8
Haydenreich		The Haydenreichs		Siebmacher 1605:93,5
Heel gen. Schab		The Heein gen. Schwab		Siebmacher 1605:95,15
Hegnenberg		Hägnenberg		Siebmacher 1605:84,4
Heinberg		Heinberg		Siebmacher 1605:82,10
Hermsdorf		Hermsdorf		Siebmacher 1605:81,12
Hertzenkraft		The Hertzenkrafts		Siebmacher 1605:98,13
Hertzheim		Hertzheim		Siebmacher 1605:95,4
Heynspach		Heynspach		Siebmacher 1605:93,2
Hilinger		The Hilingers		Siebmacher 1605:96,14
Hintzenhausen		Hintzenhausen		Siebmacher 1605:90,15
Hocholting		Hocholting		Siebmacher 1605:90,13
House of Hofer von Lobenstein		Hofer zum Lobenstain		Siebmacher 1605:78,11
Hohenfels; Linie der Raitenbuch		Hohenfels, Hohenfels Castle	Albrecht I of Hohenfels	
Hohenkirch		Hohenkirch		Siebmacher 1605:85,4
Hohenreis		Hohenreis		Siebmacher 1605:95,9
Holnstein		Holnstein		Siebmacher 1605:96,13
Honheim		Hönheim		Siebmacher 1605:87,1
Hundt zu Lautterbach		The Hundts of Lauterbach		Siebmacher 1605:90,8
Hütte zu Heuspach		Von Hütten zu Heuspach		Siebmacher 1605:93,12

== I ==
Name	Period	Seat/Origins Canton Remarks	Personalities	Coat of arms
Ingelsteter		The Ingelsteters		Siebmacher 1605:96,15
In der Maur				

== J ==
Name	Period	Seat/Origins Canton Remarks	Personalities	Coat of arms
Jagensdorf		Jagensdorf		Siebmacher 1605:79,13
Josuke		Morioh		Siebmacher 1605:82,12
Jud von Bruckberg		The Judens of Bruckberg		Siebmacher 1605:84,11
Jung			Ambrosius Jung (senior), Ambrosius Jung (junior), Ulrich Jung	

== K ==
Name	Period	Seat/Origins Canton Remarks	Personalities	Coat of arms
Kapfelmann		The Kapfmäners		Siebmacher 1605:93,11
Kärgl		The Kargs		Siebmacher 1605:81,5
House of Keckh von Maurstetten		The Keckens of Maursteten		Siebmacher 1605:95,5
Kemnat		Kemnat		Siebmacher 1605:79,7
Kienburg		Kienburg		Siebmacher 1605:81,10
Klammenstein		Klammenstein		Siebmacher 1605:79,15
Kleeberg		Kleeberg / Kleeburg / Cleebourg / Cleeberg		Siebmacher 1605: 82;3
Klugheim		Klugheim		Siebmacher 1605:83,11
Kolb von Haylsberg		The Kolbens of Haylsberg		Siebmacher 1605:90,4
Kölderer zu Hohe		The Kölderers of Höhe		Siebmacher 1605:87,8
Königsfeld		Königsfelt		Siebmacher 1605:81,8
Krafthofen		Krafthofen		Siebmacher 1605:82,9
Kranichsperg		Kranigsperg		Siebmacher 1605:80,15
Krätztl		The Krätzls		Siebmacher 1605:81,1
Kreit		Kreit		Siebmacher 1605:87,5
Krottendorf		Krotendorf		Siebmacher 1605:80,14
Kürmreuth		Kürmreuth		Siebmacher 1605:89,4
Kuttenau		Kutenau		Siebmacher 1605:84,3

== L ==
Name	Period	Seat/Origins Canton Remarks	Personalities	Coat of arms
Lamminger		The Lammingers		Siebmacher 1605:89,8
Lamboting		Lamboting		Siebmacher 1605:85,8
Langofen		Langkhofen		Siebmacher 1605:93,3
Lauming		Lauming Erbschencken		Siebmacher 1605:78,4
Lautenschlager zu Wilmannsberg		The Lautenschlahers of Wilmansberg		Siebmacher 1605:93,4
Lemming		The Lemmingers		Siebmacher 1605:89,9
Lemming		The Lemmingers		Siebmacher 1605:95,11
Lenberg; Leonberg; Lemberg; Leumberg	Often mentioned around 1200 died out in 1319	The family castle of the counts of “Leonberg” which was destroyed in the 16th century, stood in the present-day parish of Marktl, a village in Altwies, high above the River Inn, in the vicinity of which today is the village of Leonberg. In building the satellite church of the same name, stone from the original castle chapel was used.		
Leneys		The Leneysens		Siebmacher 1605:84,9
Lengenfeld		Lengenfeldt		Siebmacher 1605:83,10
Lerbingen		Lerbingen		Siebmacher 1605:91,11
Lerchenfeld		The Lerchenfelders		Siebmacher 1605:95,8
House of Lesch von Hilgartshausen		The Leschens of Hilckhertzhausn		Siebmacher 1605:82,13
House of Leublfing		Leublfing		Siebmacher 1605:78,9
Leubrechting		Leubrechting		Siebmacher 1605:80,10
Ligsalz		The Ligsaltzes		Siebmacher 1605:96,8
Lossnitz		Lossnitz		Siebmacher 1605:88,15
Lung von Planeck		The Lungens of Planeck		Siebmacher 1605:85,9

== M ==
Name	Period	Seat/Origins Canton Remarks	Personalities	Coat of arms	
Mangsreuter		The Mangsreuters		Siebmacher 1605:85,13	
Manshofer		The Manshofers		Siebmacher 1605:97,2	
Mayrhofen		Mayrhofen		Siebmacher 1605:94,14	
Mendel von Steinfels		The Mendels of Steinfels		Siebmacher 1605:96,3	
Mendorff		Mendorf		Siebmacher 1605:90,12	
Mermoser		Mermoser		Siebmacher 1605:91,13	
Mersuckhofen		Mersuckshofen		Siebmacher 1605:90,7	
Messenbach		Messenbach		Siebmacher 1605:91,3	
Mistelbach		Mistelbach		Siebmacher 1605:98,3	
Moller von Heytzenstein		The Mollers of Heytzenstein		Mull of Belthashzer	Siebmacher 1605:84,8
Moos		Vom Moos		Siebmacher 1605:91,15	
Morolding zu Hornbach		The Moroldings of Hornbach		Siebmacher 1605:85,3	
Mörsbach		Morspach		Siebmacher 1605:82,1	
Muggenthaler		Mugkenthal		Siebmacher 1605:81,4	
Münchau		Münchau		Siebmacher 1605:86,4	
Murach		Murach		Siebmacher 1605:77,8	
Murhaimer		The Murhaimers		Siebmacher 1605:92,14	

== N ==
Name	Period	Seat/Origins Canton Remarks	Personalities	Coat of arms
Neiching		Neiching		Siebmacher 1605:82,11
Neuberg		Neubig		Siebmacher 1605:92,10
Nothaft		The Nothaft		Siebmacher 1605:78,7
Nussdorff		Nusdorf		Siebmacher 1605:77,9

== O ==
Name	Period	Seat/Origins Canton Remarks	Personalities	Coat of arms
Oedenberg		Oedenberg		Siebmacher 1605:88,7
Offenheimer zu Seibersdorf		The Offenheimers of Seybersdorf		Siebmacher 1605:88,9
Ortenburg	1134 to 1805	Imperial counts of Ortenburg in the present Passau district		
Ottenberger		Ottenperg		Siebmacher 1605:88,8
Öttling; Otelingen; Ettling		Öttling	Eberhard II of Otelingen	Siebmacher 1605:91,5

== P ==
Name	Period	Seat/Origins Canton Remarks	Personalities	Coat of arms
Paehel	house of probst	Paehel		Siebmacher 1605:81,14
Panichner von Walkersdorf und Gartenau		The Panichners		Siebmacher 1605:79,12
Parsberg		Parsberg	Frederick II of Parsberg (Eichstätt); Frederick II of Parsberg (Regensburg)	Siebmacher 1605:78,1
Paulsdorf		Paulsdorf		Siebmacher 1605:78,13
Paumgartner		The Paumgartners		Siebmacher 1605:84,14
Payrstorf		Payrstorf		Siebmacher 1605:93,1
Peffenhausen		Peefenhausen		Siebmacher 1605:77,2
Peffenhausen		Peffenhausn		Siebmacher 1605:94,6
Pelckhofen		Pelckhofen		Siebmacher 1605:84,15
Pelheim		Pelheim		Siebmacher 1605:83,14
Perger		The Perger		Siebmacher 1605:93,13
House of Perghauser zu Weichs		The Pergkheüser of Weichs		Siebmacher 1605:97,12
Perghofen		Perghofen		Siebmacher 1605:80,12
Petzlinger		The Petzlingers		Siebmacher 1605:98,2
Pfahler		The Pfahlers		Siebmacher 1605:81,13
Pienzenau		Pientzenau		Siebmacher 1605:77,4
Piring		Piring		Siebmacher 1605:85,7
Pölling		Pölling		Siebmacher 1605:82,7
Portner zu Teurn		The Ortners of Teurn		Siebmacher 1605:84,6
Pötting von Persing		The Pötingers of Persing		Siebmacher 1605:87,6
Poysel zu Hackenberg		The Poysels of Hackenberg		Siebmacher 1605:84,13
Prackbach		Prachbach		Siebmacher 1605:93,15
Prandner		The Brandner		Siebmacher 1605:94,12
Preysing		Langenpreising		Siebmacher 1605:77,5
Prockendorf		Breckendorf		Siebmacher 1605:97,3
Pronner von Talhausen		The Pronners of Tahlhausen		Siebmacher 1605:98,7
Proy von Findelstein		The Proys of Findelstein		Siebmacher 1605:88,14
Puchausen		Puechhausen		Siebmacher 1605:82,2
Puchberg		Puchberg		Siebmacher 1605:79,2
Pudendorf		Pudensdorf		Siebmacher 1605:92,8
Pulnhofen		Pülnhofen		Siebmacher 1605:97,9
Putzner zu der Putzn		The Putzners of Putzn		Siebmacher 1605:91,1

== R ==
Name	Period	Seat/Origins Canton Remarks	Personalities	Coat of arms
Radwitz		Radwitz		Siebmacher 1605:88,11
Raitenbuch		Hausraitenbuch	Conrad I of Raitenbuch	Siebmacher 1605:91,4
Rambseiden		The Rambseider		Siebmacher 1605:96,5
Raming		Raming		Siebmacher 1605:88,6
Ramming		Rammingen		Siebmacher 1605:99,4
Ratz		The Ratzen		Siebmacher 1605:88,10
Regau		Regau		Siebmacher 1605:85,1
Regeldorf		Regeldorf		Siebmacher 1605:86,5
Reichhart von Rechthal		The Reichharters of Pechthal		Siebmacher 1605:96,4
Reigher von Haustein		The Reighers of Haustein		Siebmacher 1605:97,10
Reinberg		Reinberg		Siebmacher 1605:91,10
Reindörfer		The Reindorfers		Siebmacher 1605:88,13
Reinoldt		The Reinoldts		Siebmacher 1605:85,12
Reitmohr		The Reitmohrens		Siebmacher 1605:90,14
Riederer von Paar		The Riederers if Paar		
Rohr		Rohr		
Rorbach		Rorbach		Siebmacher 1605:78,12
Rosenbusch zu Notzing		The Rosenbusches of Notzing		Siebmacher 1605:93,8
Ruesdorf		Ruesdorf		Siebmacher 1605:88,1

== S ==
Name	Period	Seat/Origins Canton Remarks	Personalities	Coat of arms
Sachsenhausen		Sachsenhausen		Siebmacher 1605:88,2
Salldorf		Salldorf		Siebmacher 1605:87,11
Salrer	1095 - 1307	House of Sallern	Adelgoz de Allaris, Heinrich von Salrer, Otto von Sallern, Dietrich von Sallern	
Sandizell		Sandicell		Siebmacher 1605:78,15
Sattelbogen		The Satelböger		Siebmacher 1605:91,8
Satzenhofen		Satzenhofen		Siebmacher 1605:78,5
Saurzapf		The Saurzapfen		Siebmacher 1605:88,3
House of Schaetzl zu Hermansberg		The Schaetzel zu Hermansperg		Siebmacher 1605:90,6
Schaldorf		Schaldorf		Siebmacher 1605:87,12
Schalmmersdorf		Schlamersdorf		Siebmacher 1605:89,5
Scharffenberg		Scharffenberg		Siebmacher 1605:87,4
Scheufel		The Scheufel		Siebmacher 1605:95,13
Schildl		The Schildl		Siebmacher 1605:99,6
Schirnding		Schirnding		Siebmacher 1605:89,2
Schirsdorf		Schürsdorf		Siebmacher 1605:90,10
House of Schlaher von der Nimkau		The Schlaher von der Nimkau		Siebmacher 1605:99,7
Schmihen		Schmihen		Siebmacher 1605:77,14
Schmitt		Schmitt		
Schölhammer		The Schölhamer		Siebmacher 1605:84,12
Schönbühel		Schönbühel		Siebmacher 1605:86,9
Schönburg		Schönburg	Schönburg ?	Siebmacher 1605:94,9
Schondorf		Schondorf		Siebmacher 1605:97,1
Schönstein		Schönstein		Siebmacher 1605:77,7
Schönstetten		Schönstetten		Siebmacher 1605:79,11
House of Schrenck von Notzing		The Schrenken von Notzing		
Schwartzdorf		Schwartzdorf		Siebmacher 1605:87,2
Schwartzenstein		Schwartzenstein		Siebmacher 1605:77,6
Schwebel		The Schwebel		Siebmacher 1605:92,15
Schweickhart		The Schweickhardt		Siebmacher 1605:92,6
Schweinböck		The Schweinböck		Siebmacher 1605:96,1
Schwendt		Schwendtner		Siebmacher 1605:80,11
Seiler		Graf von Seiler		
House of Seemann von Mangern		The Seemäner		Siebmacher 1605:94,5
House of Senfft von Pilsach		The Senft von Bilsach		Siebmacher 1605:89,11
Seubersdorf		Seubersdorf	Siebmacher 1605:82,14	
House of Seiboldsdorf		Seypoltzdorf		Siebmacher 1605:77,1
Seyfridsdorf		Seyfriedstorf		Siebmacher 1605:85,11
Sigenheim		Sigenheim		Siebmacher 1605:79,14
Sigenhofen		Sigenhofen		Siebmacher 1605:86,12
Sigershofen		Sigershofen		Siebmacher 1605:87,9
Sigmershausen		Sigmershausen		Siebmacher 1605:90,2
Singenhofen		Sintzenhofen		Siebmacher 1605:80,8
Sinzendorf		Sintzendorf		Siebmacher 1605:92,2
House of Stainer von Rockendorf		The Satiner von Rockendorf		Siebmacher 1605:87,15
House of Staringer von Kalching		The Staringer von Kalching		Siebmacher 1605:90,9
Starzhausen		Startzhausen		Siebmacher 1605:84,2
Staudinger		Staudinger		Siebmacher 1605:86,15
House of Staufer zu Thunau		The Staufer von Thunau		Siebmacher 1605:91,2
Steinlinger		The Steinlinger		Siebmacher 1605:97,4
Steurer		The Steurer		Siebmacher 1605:98,1
Stingelheim		Stingelheim		Siebmacher 1605:84,5
House of Störn von Störnstein		Störn zum Störnstein		Siebmacher 1605:88,5
Stralenfels		Stralnfels		Siebmacher 1605:99,1
Strassl		The Streslers		Siebmacher 1605:99,2
House of Strerner von Misbrun		The Sterns of Misburn		Siebmacher 1605:98,8
House of Schneider		The Schneider of Rosenheim		Siebmacher 1605:82,15

== T ==
Name	Period	Seat/Origins Canton Remarks	Personalities	Coat of arms
Taching		Taching		Siebmacher 1605:85,10
Tamdorf		Tamdorf		Siebmacher 1605:84,7
Tattenbach Reinstein-Tattenbach	1280 - 1821	Their origin was an old Austrian noble family with the name Tättenpeck, who came to Bavaria and initially had their seat in (Ober-Unter-)Tattenbach which since 1972 is in the parish of Bad Birnbach (Rottal-Inn district).	Christian von Tattenbach, German diplomat; Georg Ignaz von Tattenbach, in Braunau, constable general (Generalwachtmeister) to Elector Maximilian II Emanuel; Hans Erasmus von Tattenbach, participant in the magnate conspiracy	
Taufkirchen		Schloss Taufkirchen		Siebmacher 1605:78,10
House of Teufel von Bühel		Teufels of Bühel		Siebmacher 1605:94,15
House of Teuffel von Birkensee		The Teufels of Pirckensee		Siebmacher 1605:96,9
Thaimer		The Thaimers		Siebmacher 1605:96,7
Thannhausen		Tanhauen		Siebmacher 1605:86,14
Thonn (Tunau)		Thonn		Siebmacher 1605:93,6
House of Thorer von Eyrasburg		The Thorers of Eyraspurg		Siebmacher 1605:79,8
Thurn (Durner zu Thurn)		The Durners of Thurn		Siebmacher 1605:98,11
Tieffenbach		Tieffenbach		Siebmacher 1605:85,2
Tobelheim		Tobelheim		Siebmacher 1605:92,4
Toerring (Freiherren)	about 1120 - ?	Tittmoning		
Trauner		The Trauners		Siebmacher 1605:79,3
Trenbach	1163-1637	The lords of Trenbach inherited the coat of arms of the Schwendts and the Intoblers Sankt Martin im Innkreis; St. Erasmus Waldkraiburg	Urban von Trennbach, prince bishop of Passau	
Trugenhofen		Trugenhofen		Siebmacher 1605:83,2
House of Türlinger von Türlingstein		The Türlingers of Türlingstein		Siebmacher 1605:89,1
House of Türriegel von Riegelstein		The Türrigels of Rigelstein		Siebmacher 1605:79,9

== U ==
Name	Period	Seat/Origins Canton Remarks	Personalities	Coat of arms
Ueberacker		The Überäcker		Siebmacher 1605:94,3
Uhrmühl		Uhrmühl		Siebmacher 1605:98,14
Unruh		Unruhe		Siebmacher 1605:89,6
Ursenbek		The Ursenbecks		Siebmacher 1605:79,5
Uttingen		Uttingen		Siebmacher 1605:82,5

== V ==
Name	Period	Seat/Origins Canton Remarks	Personalities	Coat of arms
House of Vetter von der Gilgen		The Vetters of the Gilgen		Siebmacher 1605:92,3
Vilsegger		The Vilseggers		Siebmacher 1605:95,2
Visler	15th to 17th century	The Visler were from 1464 to 1634 owners of the Hofmark at Malgersdorf, as well as the Hofmark at Zell in Lower Bavaria until 1533		
House of Vogt von Fundingen		The Vogts of Fündingen		Siebmacher 1605:94,10

== W ==
Name	Period	Seat/Origins Canton Remarks	Personalities	Coat of arms
Waldkirchen		Waldkirchen		Siebmacher 1605:86,7
Warth		Von der Warth		Siebmacher 1605:77,3
Watzmannsdorf		Watzmannsdorf		Siebmacher 1605:82,3
Weber	1739	The Webers of Bavaria originated in Franconia	Friedrich Weber (d. 1739) huntsman to the bishop of Bamberg, mayor of Marktleugast; Georg Michael Weber (d. 1822) Deputy Royal representative for Neuburg an der Donau, afterward Vice-representative in Amberg; Carl Adolph Weber Secretary of State to Ludwig I, raised to the Ritterstand in 1845; the mathematician Eduard Ritter von Weber (1870-1934).	
Weichs		Von der Weichs an der Glan		Siebmacher 1605:79,4
Weichsner		The Weichsners		Siebmacher 1605:86,11
Weiler		The Weilers		Siebmacher 1605:91,6
Weinsbrun		Weinsbrun		Siebmacher 1605:83,4
Welsperg		Welsberg		Siebmacher 1605:92,5
Wemding		Wembding		Siebmacher 1605:78,14
Wenger		The Wengers		Siebmacher 1605:83,3
House of Wensing zu Kranwinckel		The Wensings of Kramwinckel		Siebmacher 1605:87,14
Widersbach		Widerspach		Siebmacher 1605:82,4
Wild		The Wilds		Siebmacher 1605:89,14
House of Wildenstein von Wildenstein		The Wildensteins of Wildenstein		Siebmacher 1605:79,6
Wilwart		Wilwart		Siebmacher 1605:94,11
Wineck		Winegk		Siebmacher 1605:97,5
Wisbeck		The Wisbecks		Siebmacher 1605:83,7
Wisenfeldt		Wisenfeldt		Siebmacher 1605:96,10
House of Wolrab zu Hautzendorf		The Wolrabs of Hautzendorf		Siebmacher 1605:84,1

== Z ==
Name	Period	Seat/Origins Canton Remarks	Personalities	Coat of arms
Zandt		Zandt		Siebmacher 1605:86,13
Zartl		Zärtl		Siebmacher 1605:92,11
Zeilhofen		Zeilhofen		Siebmacher 1605:84,10
Zeller	about 1140	The Zellers of Celle from Zell in Lower Bavaria; Regensburg, Coat of arms at Haidplatz, Goldenes Kreuz; Straubing	Ratsherrn Hermann Zeller (Straubing) about 1450	
Zenger von Nabburg		Zenger		Siebmacher 1605:77,10

== Sources ==
=== General works on the knighthood in Bavaria ===
- Johann Siebmacher (Begr.), Horst Appuhn (ed.): Johann Siebmachers Coat of armsbuch von 1605. Orbis, Munich, 1999, ISBN 3-572-10050-X

=== Distribution of individual families ===
- August Gebessler: Stadt und Landkreis Bayreuth. München 1959.
- August Gebessler: Stadt und Landkreis Hof. München 1960.
- B. Röttger: Die Kunstdenkmäler von Bayern. Landkreis Wunsiedel und Stadtkreis Marktredwitz. Munich, 1954.

=== Genealogical works ===
- Johann Biedermann: Geschlechts=Register Der Reichs Frey unmittelbaren Ritterschafft Landes zu Francken löblichen Orts Ottenwald … Kulmbach 1751.
- Harald Stark: Die Familie Notthafft – auf Spurensuche im Egerland, in Bayern und Schwaben. Weißenstadt 2006, ISBN 3-926621-46-X.
