= List of sister cities in Illinois =

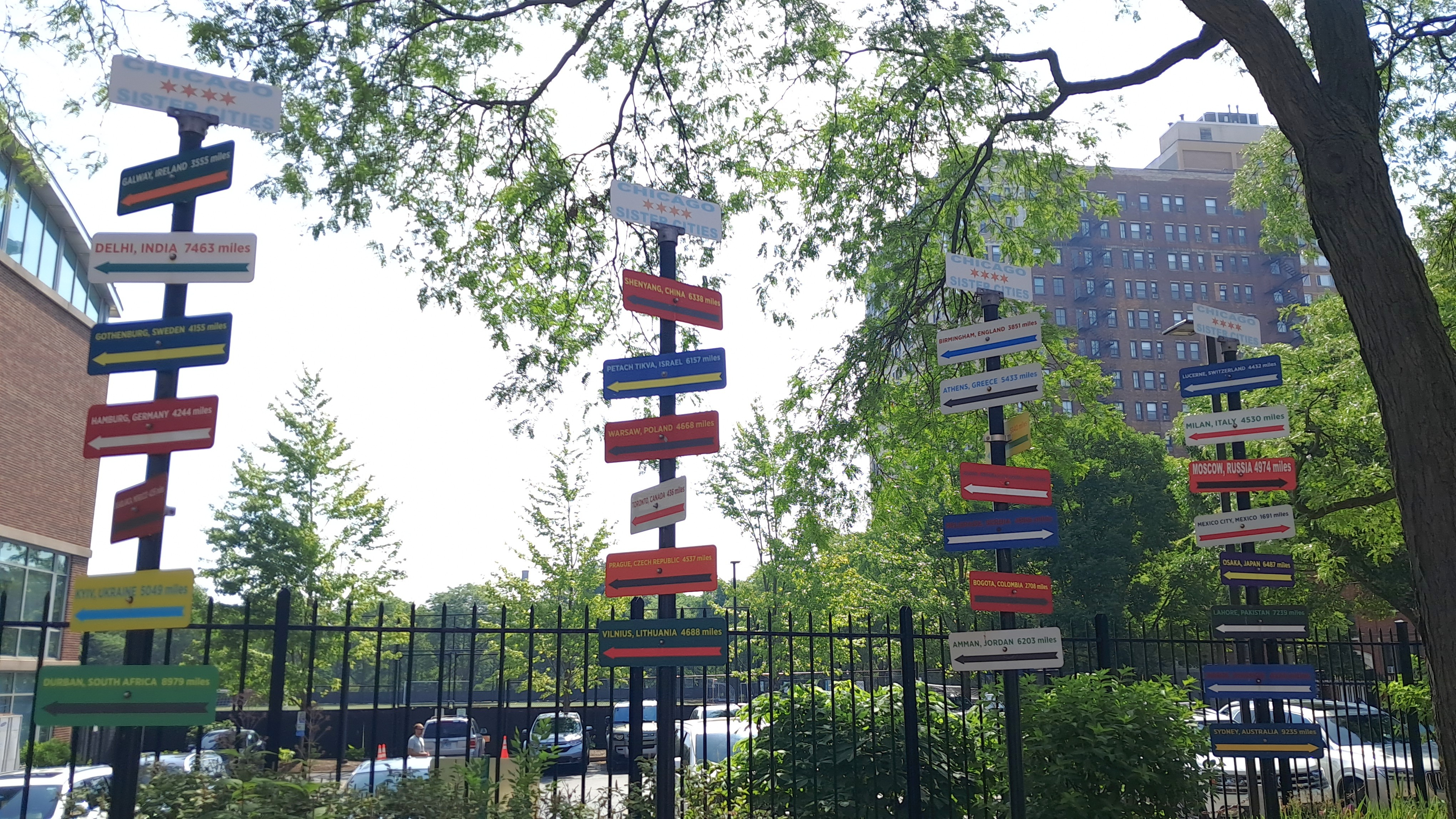
Signs denoting sister cities in Chicago

This is a list of sister cities in the United States state of Illinois. Sister cities, known in Europe as town twins, are cities which partner with each other to promote human contact and cultural links, although this partnering is not limited to cities and often includes counties, regions, states and other sub-national entities.

Many Illinois jurisdictions work with foreign cities through Sister Cities International, an organization whose goal is to "promote peace through mutual respect, understanding, and cooperation."

== A ==
Addison

- Triggiano, Italy

== B ==
Bartlett

- Miaoli, Taiwan

Belleville

- Paderborn, Germany

Belvidere

- Schwieberdingen, Germany
- Vaux-le-Pénil, France

Bensenville

- Zihuatanejo de Azueta, Mexico

Bloomington

- Asahikawa, Japan
- Caibarién, Cuba
- Canterbury, England, United Kingdom
- Remedios, Cuba
- Vladimir, Russia

Bolingbrook

- (Republic of the Congo) Brazzaville, Congo
- San Pablo, Philippines
- Sialkot, Pakistan
- Xuchang, China

== C ==
Carbondale

- Shimla, India
- Tainai, Japan
- Tainan, Taiwan

Chicago

- Accra, Ghana
- Amman, Jordan
- Athens, Greece
- Belgrade, Serbia
- Birmingham, England, United Kingdom
- Bogotá, Colombia
- Busan, South Korea
- Casablanca, Morocco
- Delhi, India
- Durban, South Africa
- (Republic of Ireland) Galway, Ireland
- Gothenburg, Sweden
- Hamburg, Germany
- Kyiv, Ukraine
- Lahore, Pakistan
- Lucerne, Switzerland
- Mexico City, Mexico
- Milan, Italy
- Osaka, Japan
- Petah Tikva, Israel
- Prague, Czech Republic
- Shanghai, China
- Shenyang, China
- Toronto, Canada
- Vilnius, Lithuania
- Warsaw, Poland

Chicago Heights

- Asuogyaman District, Ghana
- Cedral, Mexico
- San Benedetto del Tronto, Italy
- Wadowice, Poland

Columbia

- Gedern, Germany

Crystal Lake

- Holzgerlingen, Germany

== D ==
Decatur

- Seevetal, Germany
- Tokorozawa, Japan

Des Plaines

- Nailuva, Fiji

Dixon

- (Republic of Ireland) Castlebar, Ireland
- Dikson, Russia
- Herzberg, Germany
- Thika, Kenya

== E ==
Elgin

- Vientiane, Laos

Elk Grove Village

- Termini Imerese, Italy

Evanston

- Belize City, Belize
- Dniprovskyi (Kyiv), Ukraine

== F ==
Franklin Park

- Skarżysko-Kamienna, Poland
- Victoria de Durango, Mexico

== G ==
Galesburg

- Ma'anshan, China

Galva

- Gävle, Sweden

Glen Ellyn

- Le Bouscat, France
- Calatayud, Spain

== H ==
Hanover Park

- Cape Coast, Ghana
- Valparaíso, Mexico

Highland

- Sursee, Switzerland

Highland Park

- Ferrara, Italy
- Modena, Italy
- Puerto Vallarta, Mexico
- Yeruham, Israel

Hoffman Estates

- Angoulême, France

== L ==
Lake Zurich

- Nittenau, Germany

Lockport

- Asiago, Italy

== M ==
Millstadt

- Groß-Bieberau, Germany

Mount Prospect

- Sèvres, France

== N ==
Naperville

- Benito Juárez, Mexico
- Nitra, Slovakia
- Pátzcuaro, Mexico

Niles

- (Republic of Ireland) Leixlip, Ireland
- Limanowa, Poland
- Nafplio, Greece
- Pisa, Italy

Normal

- Asahikawa, Japan
- Caibarién, Cuba
- Canterbury, England, United Kingdom
- Remedios, Cuba
- Vladimir, Russia

Northbrook

- Diegem (Machelen), Belgium

== P ==
Palatine

- Fontenay-le-Comte, France

Park Ridge

- Kinver, England, United Kingdom

Peoria

- Friedrichshafen, Germany

== Q ==
Quincy

- Herford (district), Germany

== R ==
Richton Park

- (The Bahamas) Cat Island, Bahamas

Rockford

- Borgholm, Sweden
- Brovary, Ukraine
- Changzhou, China
- Cluj-Napoca, Romania
- Ferentino, Italy
- Taszár, Hungary
- Tokmok, Kyrgyzstan

Rolling Meadows

- Hénin-Beaumont, France

Roselle

- Bochnia, Poland

== S ==
Schaumburg

- Namerikawa, Japan
- Schaumburg (district), Germany

Springfield

- Ashikaga, Japan
- Jining, China
- San Pedro, Mexico

Sterling

- Canoinhas, Brazil

Stone Park

- Ocotlán, Mexico

== T ==
Tinley Park

- Büdingen, Germany
- (Republic of Ireland) Mallow, Ireland
- Nowy Sącz, Poland

== U ==
Urbana

- Haizhu (Guangzhou), China
- Thionville, France
- Zomba, Malawi

== W ==
Waterloo

- Porta Westfalica, Germany

Waukegan

- Miyazaki, Japan

West Chicago

- Taufkirchen, Germany

Western Springs

- Cannock Chase, England, United Kingdom

Westmont

- Hsinchu County, Taiwan

Wheaton

- Karlskoga, Sweden
- Wheaton Aston, England, United Kingdom

Wood Dale

- Cefalù, Italy

Woodstock

- Guadalupe, Mexico
- Zacatecas, Mexico
