= Wasserschloss Taufkirchen =

- Taufkirchen, Bavaria
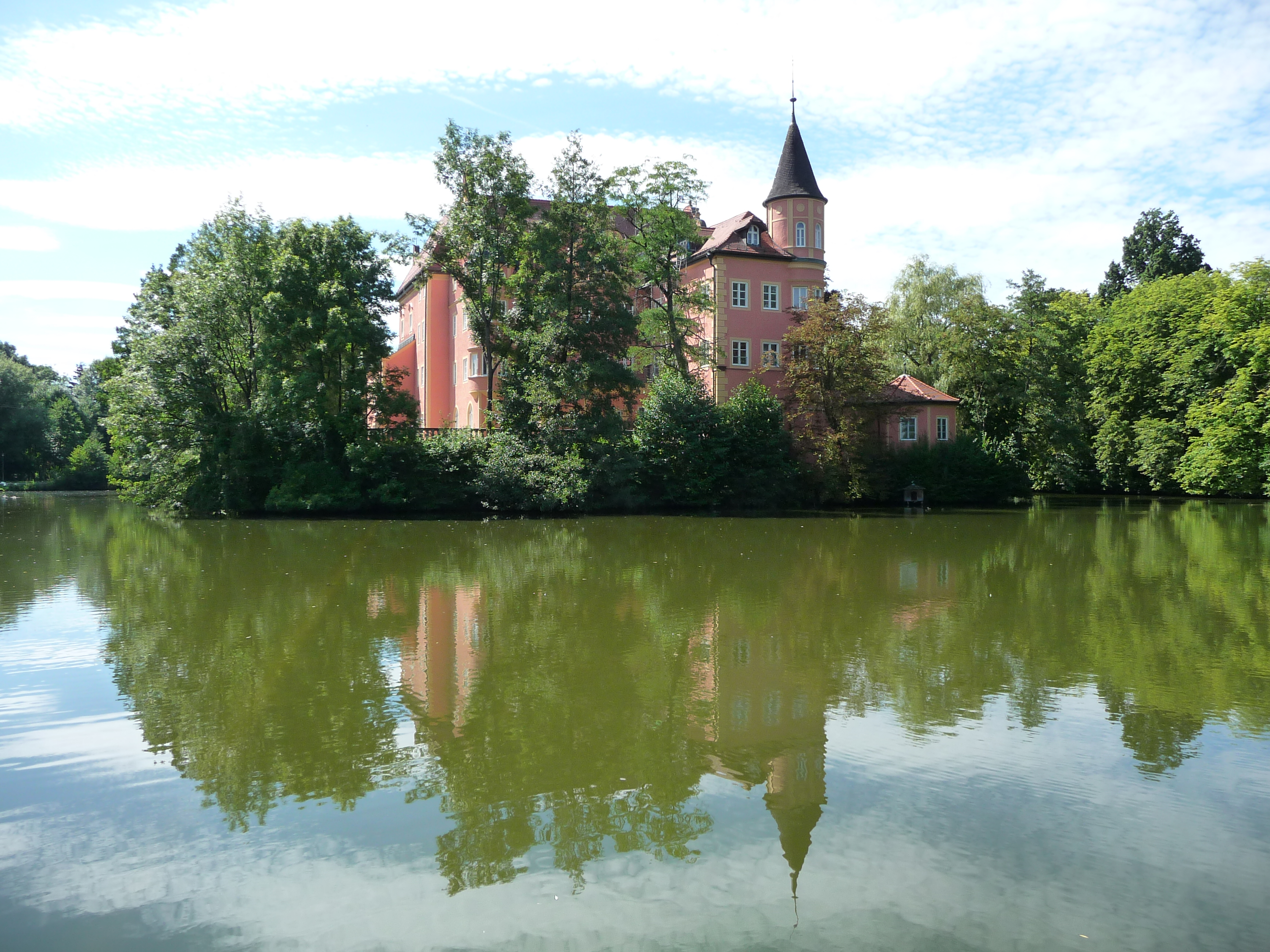
- View of the castle in August 2008

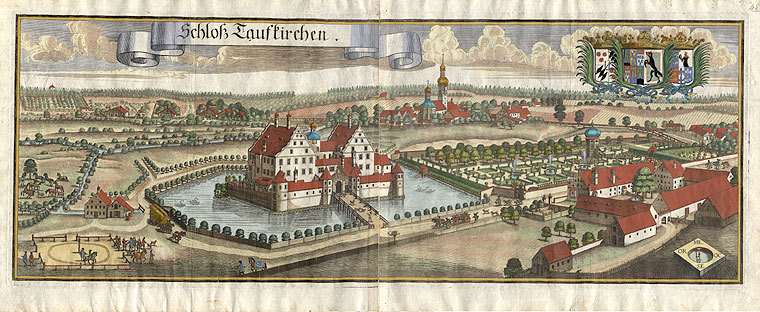
- View of the castle c.1700 by Michael Wening

Location
- Coordinates: 48.344814°N 12.134107°E

The Wasserschloss Taufkirchen is a moated castle in Taufkirchen (Vils), Bavaria.

== History ==
A noble family named Taufkirchen is recorded as living in the town in the 11th century. Gerhard von Taufkirchen is mentioned in documents from 1140. The first mention of the castle and parish in one document dates to 1263, describing a dispute between Bishop Conrad II, Count of Wittelsbach, and Grimold von Taufkirchen over the rights to occupy the Taufkirchen, described as "iuxta castellum eius" (near the castle).

Later the Lords of Fraunberg owned the Castle, then from 1554-1672 it was the property of the Fuggers. This family expanded the original building, and added a chapel. The altar has the Fugger coat of arms. The castle then passed to the Barons of Puech, who brought wealth into the town. Following that the castle went through various ups and downs. In the last half of the 20th century it was the property of the government of Upper Bavaria. Until 1998 the castle's rooms were used for patients of the district hospital, while separate buildings in the castle park were used for patients of the psychiatric hospital.

The "Friends of Taufkirchen Castle" (Förderverein Schloss Taufkirchen) association was founded in 1997 with the goal of preserving the historical landmark. After lengthy negotiations with the government of Upper Bavaria, on 17 January 2005 the castle was sold to the private owner Nico Forster of Kraiburg. He bought the castle for the symbolic price of one euro in exchange for agreeing to undertake a careful restoration, and to allow parts of the castle to be used for cultural purposes. As of 2011 the municipality of Taufkirchen was considering buying the castle.

== Owners ==
A partial list of owners of the castle:

- 1263 Grimold von Taufkirchen
- 1377 Arnold von Fraunberg zu Taufkirchen † 1419
- 1419 Seiz von Fraunberg (son) † 1429
- 1429 Kyburg von Fraunberg (sister) † 1442
- 1435 Georg (Jörg) von Gundelfingen (husband) † 1450
- 1450 Parzival, Georg, Hans oder Wilhelm von Aichperg
- 1486 Sigmund von Fraunberg zu Haag † 1521
- 1522 Ladislaus von Fraunberg zu Haag (grandson) † 1566
- 1554 Hans Jakob Fugger von Kirchberg und Weißenhorn † 1575
- 1575 Severin Fugger (son) † 1601
- 1597 Joachim Fugger half brother) † 1607
- 1625 Konstantin Fugger (brother) † 1627
- 1627 Franz Benno Fugger (son) † 1652
- 1652 Franz Benno Fugger (son) † 1670
- 1672 Johann Ferdinand von Puech † 1685
- 1685 Adam von Puech (son) † 1722
- 1723 Franz Adam Roman von Freyberg † 1748
- 1748 Franz Peter von Rosenbusch † 1768
- 1768 Maria Johanna von Rosenbusch (widow) † 1796
- 1796 Hermann Josef Emanuel von Lerchenfeld † 1800
- 1800 Franz Xaver von Lerchenfeld (son) † 1832
- 1823 Elisabeth von Moreau (buyer) † 1849
- 1849 Friedrich August von Moreau (son) † 1885
- 1863 Maximilian Joseph von Seinsheim (buyer) † 1885
- 1885 Carl von Seinsheim (son) † 1910
- 1891 Wilhelm von Rambertz-Fest (buyer)
- 1898 Gebhard von Alvensleben (buyer) † 1935
- 1902 "Junior & Partner" Baugeschäft, Frankfurt
- 1910 Dr. Gustav Rohn (buyer)
- 1911 Tihamer Maximilian Baróvházy (buyer)
- 1913 Dr. Gustav Rohn (restored by court decision)
- 1917 Guts- und Brauereigenossenschaft Taufkirchen
- 1919 Landesarmenanstalt, Bezirk Oberbayern
- 2005 Nico Forster
