= Puech =

Puech is a French surname that comes from the Occitan word puèg, "hill". Notable people with the surname include:

- Denys Puech (1854–1942), French sculptor
- Émile Puech (born 1941), French biblical scholar
- Henri-Charles Puech (1902–1986), French historian
- Jean Puech (born 1942), French politician
- Jean-Baptiste Puech, French actor
- Louis Puech (1852–1947), French politician
- Marie-Louise Puech-Milhau (1876-1966), French pacifist, feminist and journal editor
- Nicolas Puech (born 1943), French billionaire

== See also ==
- Le Puech, a French commune
- Musée Denys-Puech, a French art gallery
