= House of Thurn =

New York fashion house

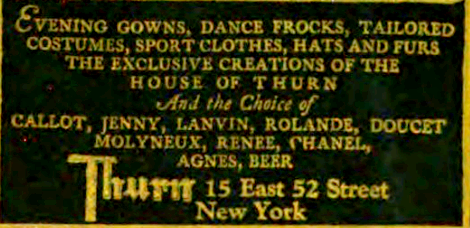
- Industry: Fashion#Fashion industry
- Founded: 1870
- Defunct: 1934
- Headquarters: Manhattan, New York City
- Products: Haute couture

House of Thurn was an haute couture label founded by Sidonie Thurn and continued by her daughter Carolyn Hague. The house, known by its label as Thurn, prepared made-to-order fashions for its wealthy customers. Begun as a small import shop in Brooklyn, Thurn occupied a succession of buildings on or near Fifth Avenue from 1870 to 1934. The last of these was a remodeled Gilded Age townhouse located between Madison and Fifth Avenues at 15 East 52nd Street. An article in Arts & Decoration magazine for July 1923 described this location as "a charming salon, all flattering French gray, with sparkling mirrors and gracious French furniture covered with satin damask of gray and gold." In 1926, a writer for The Nation listed Thurn as one of the sixteen most exclusive houses in New York. In 1937, the owner of one of the sixteen houses, said that Thurn had been "practically the highest class business establishment of the kind in New York City." Museum collections that hold Thurn fashions include the Metropolitan Museum of Art, The Los Angeles County Museum of Art, the Hillwood Museum, the Indianapolis Museum of Art, and the Fashion Institute of Design Museum, Los Angeles.

== Origins ==
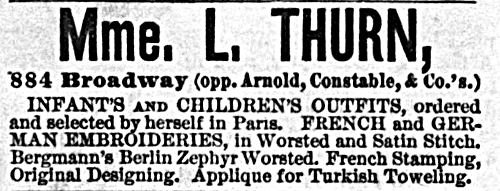
Display ad for the Thurn children's clothing store at 884 Broadway in 1875

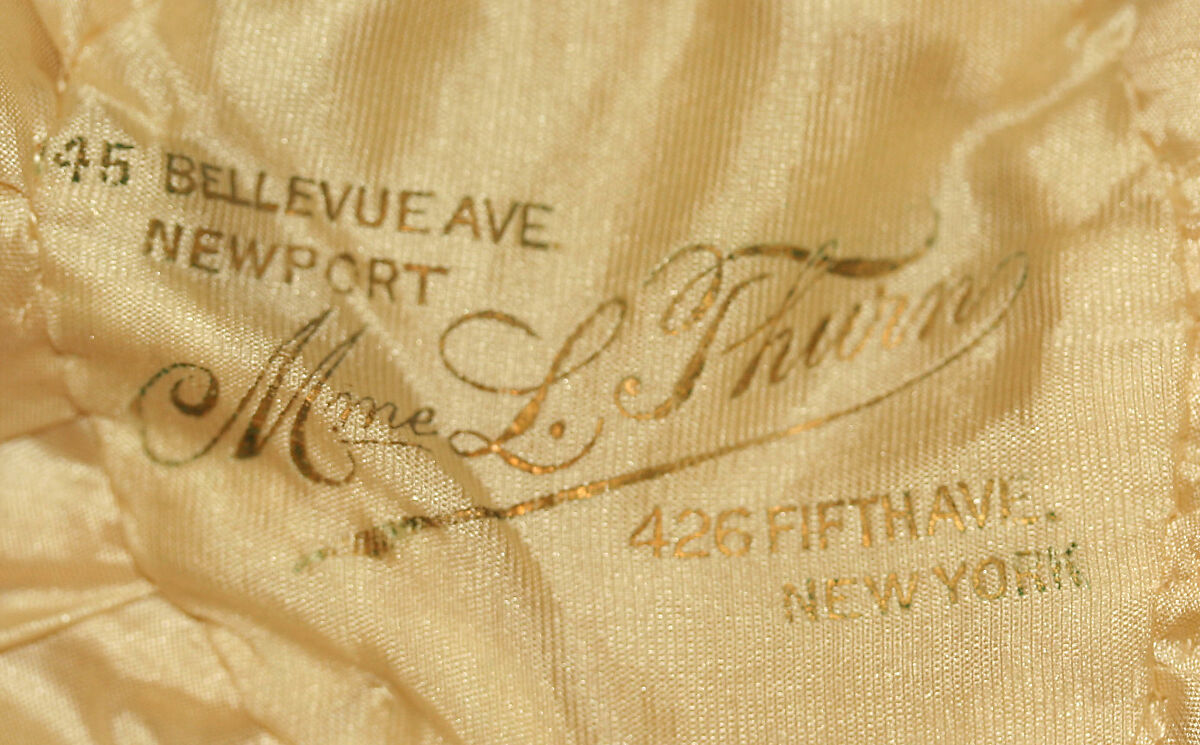
Thurn label from a silk girl's dress, 1887

Thurn's founder was a German immigrant named Caroline Sidonie Dittmarsch, who in the mid-1860s had married a teacher named Leopold Thurn. After operating briefly in partnership with the head of a girls' school, Sidonie opened the first of the Thurn clothing shops in 1870. At that time, both the business and the proprietor were called either Madame L. Thurn or simply Madame Thurn. In 1873, Thurn moved from its original Brooklyn location to one on Broadway two blocks north of Union Square. It made children's clothing and accessories from Parisian designs and custom-fitted them to its customers, adding embroidery and other enhancements as requested. In 1880, Thurn moved to 288 Fifth Avenue, the first of a succession of Fifth Avenue locations. In 1890, the shop moved further uptown to 426 Fifth Avenue and remained there until 1913 when the entire block was torn down to make way for construction of the flagship building of the Lord & Taylor department store.

In the 1890s, Thurn benefited from the increasing preference of wealthy Americans for Parisian fashions. The firm continued to grow and by 1889 it employed a large staff of trimmers, drapers, finishers, and other specialized workers who were supervised by a forewoman. Its workforce in 1900 was 175 employees of all types. One source says that Thurn attracted society clients during this period, including members of the Rockefeller and Mellon families.

In 1880, Sidonie's fifteen-year-old daughter, Carolyn, had begun to work in the shop by using shop trimmings to make dolls' hats to sell as Christmas gifts. About ten years later, Sidonie hired a Parisian artist named Ernest Hague (or Hagué) to make patterns and design dresses. Soon thereafter, Carolyn married Hague and took Madame Hague as her professional name. About 1912, Thurn hired as designer James B. Blaine, a man who had worked for Parisian houses and who had served as president of the Ladies' Tailors and Dressmakers' Association of America. A year later, the name "Thurn" became a registered trademark. During this period, the business continued to grow as wealthy Americans set new records in their expenditures to purchase Parisian fashions and other imported luxuries.

At the turn of the century, Sidonie had agreed with Hague's proposal that Thurn begin to offer Parisian fashions for young women and in 1901 Sidonie signed papers making Hague her partner in the business. In 1902, Thurn began placing want ads for workers skilled in making women's clothing and by 1903 it had established "a special department for young matrons and debutantes". A year later, an article in Good Housekeeping described how the New York dressmakers would adapt Parisian designs for American women. The author said, "American women can very seldom wear the things designed for the Parisian," and explained, "of course, the original design is Parisian and is recognized as such, but certain alterations are necessary and are always made."

In the early years of the twentieth century, wealthy women and the couturiers they patronized attempted to save money by smuggling Parisian fashions into the Port of New York. At the time, these duties amounted to 50% to 80% of the cost of the items being imported, and in some cases, such as woolen cloth, they could double the cost of the imported material. In 1909, Hague and the owners of other New York fashion houses were arrested and subsequently paid fines for attempting to avoid import duties. News accounts of the 1909 smuggling attempt revealed that steamer trunks containing Paris fashions and fabrics would be surreptitiously moved from the docks of arriving ocean liners to the docks of departing ones. From there, it was possible to retrieve the trunks as if they were being reclaimed by passengers who had booked passaged and then canceled their trips at the last moment.

== 1914–1933, House of Thurn ==
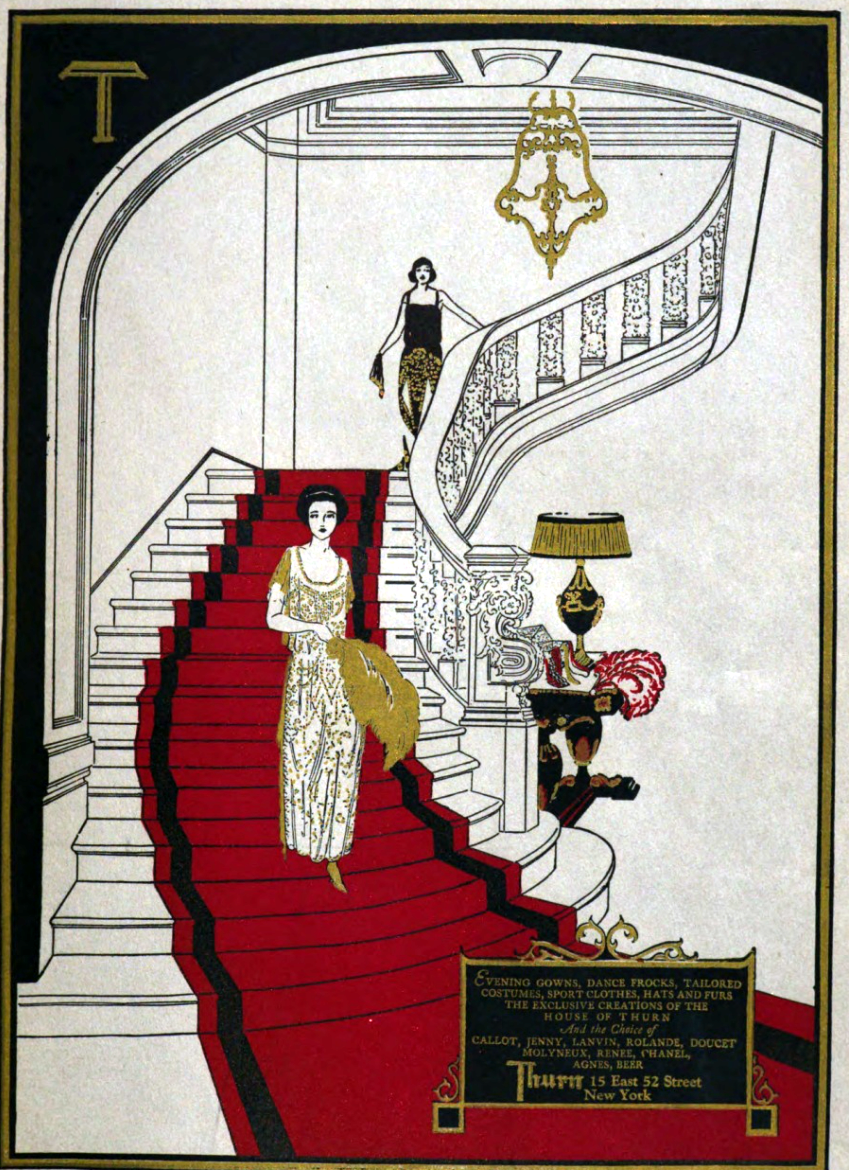
(1) Grand staircase at the House of Thurn at 52 East 52nd Street

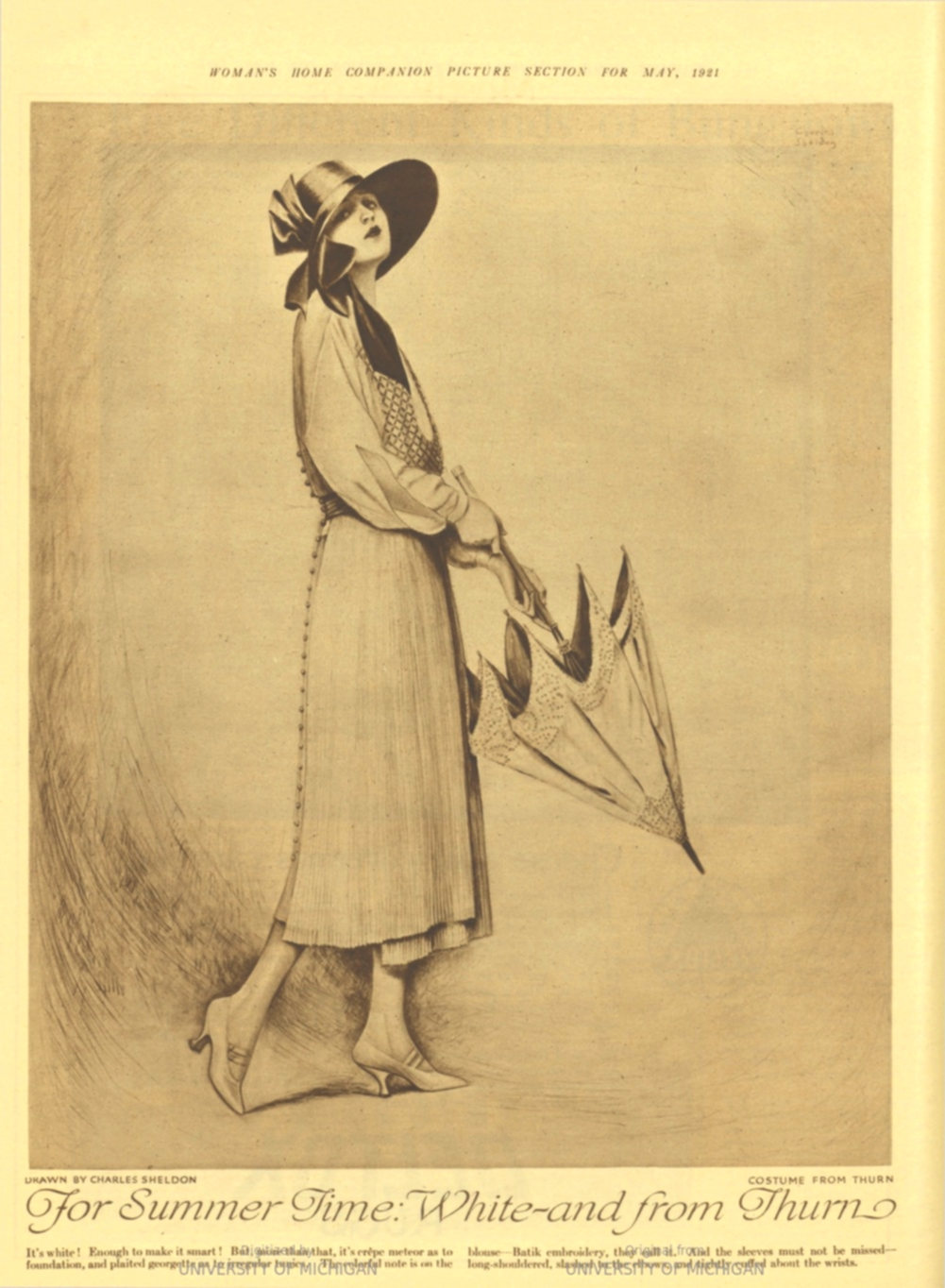
(2) Drawing from Woman's Home Companion, vol 48, no 5, May 1921

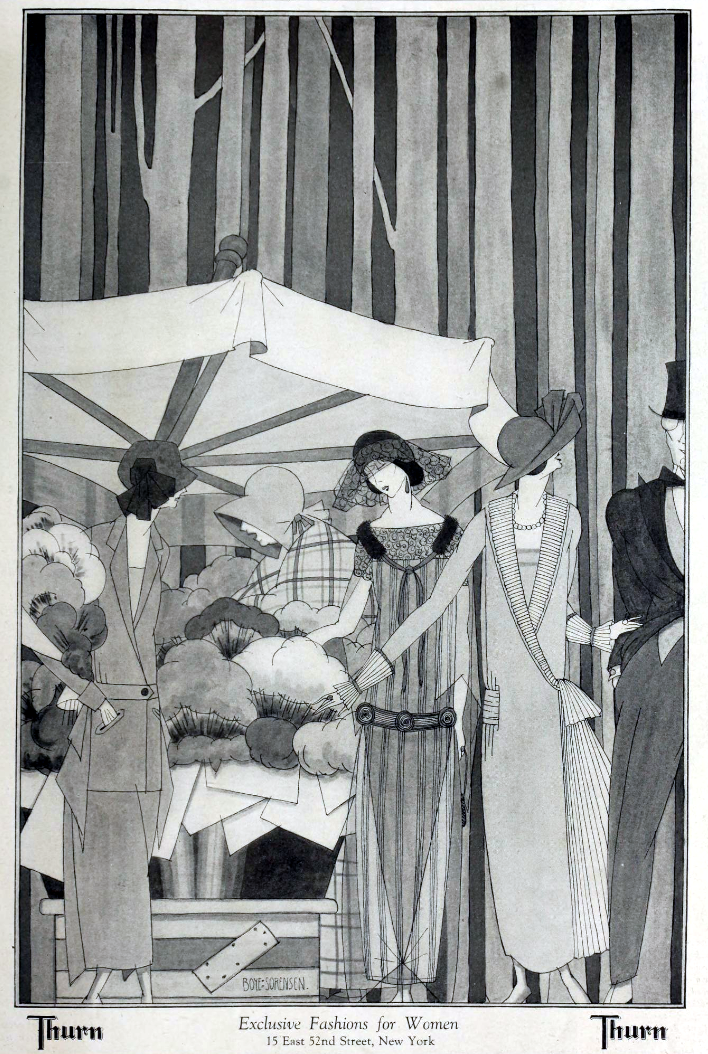
(3) Display ad from Arts & Decorations, January 1923, vol. 18, no. 4, p. 44

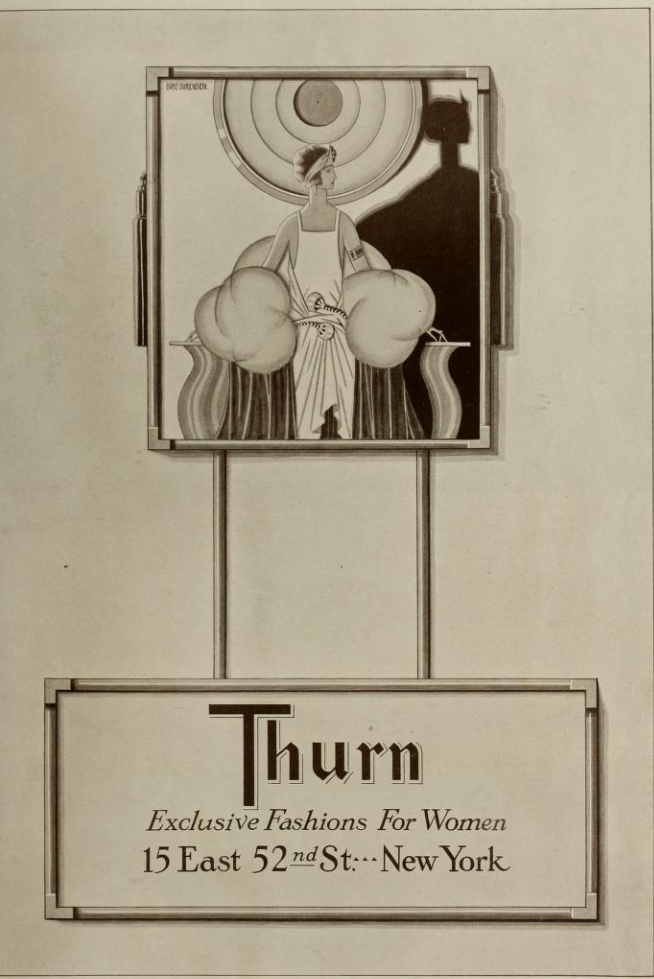
(4) Display ad from Arts & Decorations, April 1923, vol. 18, no. 6, p. 39

In 1914, Thurn occupied its final and principal location at 15 E. 52nd Street in Manhattan. The building had been constructed in 1903 as a private residence for the sales director of the Procter & Gamble soap company. Designed by the American architect Donn Barber, the building featured imported marble and was said to be one of the finest mansions in the city. Thurn had the interior of the upper floors modified for the use of its dressmakers but left intact the facade and ground floor with its elegant curved staircase (see Image No. 1, above). The twenty-one-year lease had an aggregate rental of $500,000. When Thurn opened in the new location, the neighborhood was in a transition from residential to commercial. The Vanderbilt family had sold its properties along nearby Fifth Avenue and prestigious retail firms, such as the Cartier jewelry store, were taking their place. Hague later recalled that she and her mother perceived the 52nd Street location to be more prestigious than 57th Street.

Clothes are such an important factor in the success and enjoyment of the majority of society women that one can readily understand how tremendous a power is the fashionable modiste in any large city... Women from all over the country flock to New York for their clothes, and if fitted out appropriately at any of the leading modistes, must certainly have substantial bank accounts to withstand the shock, for the dressmaker must be paid not only for the gowns she furnishes; the ever-increasing expenses of her magnificently conducted establishment must be considered also. Formerly a modest show window for the display of one or two choice models and a few rooms in the rear in which the work was conducted, were sufficient. Now liveried servants open the doors of artistically appointed mansions, and madame receives. Profiting by the knowledge she has acquired abroad, she discreetly exhibits a few of her choice creations on living models, much after the Parisian manner.

— Babette A. Muelle, "New York Dressmakers",Good Housekeeping (vol. 36, no. 4, pp. 302-303)

(5) Velvet dress from a Thurn ensemble, about 1910

In 1917, Hague bought her mother's share of the business for $100,000 and became its sole owner. By the time of her mother's death in 1919, she had become a successful and respected designer, stylist, maker, and seller of fashionable women's clothing. In the early 1920s, Thurn attracted the attention of the editors of women's magazines (see Image No. 2, for example) and began to place full-page ads to bolster its business (see Image Nos. 3 and 4). In 1923, Hague told an interviewer that while society women would then still travel to Paris to see fashions, they often would make appointments to see her on their return. She said: "We choose and import the flower of the French collections, and then add to the group our own originations. We think of a woman's whole day—her tailleurs, her trotteur hats, her daytime frocks and dance frocks, her sport clothes, dinner gowns, theatre gowns, everything! A woman can come to us and know that she will find frocks and wraps and costumes for every hour, and all in the same spirit of simple distinction that marks the clothes of our house." Hague employed a general manager to oversee operations and gave her personal attention to the satisfaction of her customers' wishes. In 1931, a writer said of Thurn, "all the blue-bloods in town come here at some time or other, as do many rich and aristocratic out-of-towners, to put themselves into the competent hands of Madame Hague, daughter of the first Thurn." Hague later said she had customers who would buy from her as many as sixty gowns a year. To prepare for the spring and fall fashion seasons in New York, she would make two annual trips to Paris. During these sessions, she would make note of the new styles, arrange to buy models of clothing she believed were suitable for her customers, and purchase the fabrics she needed to produce made-to-order fashions from the models. Describing Hague as smart and clever, the writer of an article in Vogue wrote, "if one could copy the way she thinks, one would know all about clothes." In 1937, a long-time customer said that throughout her long association with Thurn she had full confidence in Hague's taste. She said, "I have spent a great deal of money there, and it was worth it... It is like going to Cartier's or Tiffany's. When you say you are going to Thurn's, you are going to Thurn's. That meant a whole lot."

(6) Rose print silk evening dress by Thurn, 1912

After she retired, Hague explained Thurn's business in some detail. Like other made-to-order houses, it employed hundreds of women to stitch garments using sewing machines and by handwork. It used a much smaller number of skilled craftswomen, including the designers who created patterns, the cutters who cut fabric according to pattern, the drapers who adjusted the garments to suit each customer's needs, and the finishers who made sure each garment fitted the customer correctly. Thurn also employed saleswomen and their assistants who accompanied customers throughout their visits to the shop. It priced its dresses between $175 and $450 each. During the busy weeks of the year's two fashion seasons, it would serve 50 to 60 customers a day.

I have a kind of intuition by which I know what will best fit each woman who comes to me. It sounds absurd on the face of it; it is what everyone says who makes clothes or hats. But I have women who come to me from England, from Cuba, from all over the United States, who come back year after year, because they know that I have done that for them. I have made them distinguished for being well dressed.

— Carolyn Hague, Quoted in: "Distinction Changes Slowly", by Dorothy Cocks, Arts & Decoration (v. 28, n. 3, January 1923, p. 4)

(7) Black silk underdress with velvet panel and black silk embroidery, 1914

(8) Red velvet dress trimmed with metallic gold thread and red glass beads, early 1920s

There are various measures of Thurn's success. In 1924, the business paid over $32,000 in state taxes while a major competitor, Bergdorf Goodman, paid less than $28.000 In 1925, a writer for Vogue called Thurn "the last and greatest of the old dressmaking houses of New York". In 1926, an article in The Nation by labor organizer Ann Washington Craton described the custom-dress fashion industry in New York. She listed Thurn as one of the sixteen most exclusive houses in the city, saying, "the patrons and customers are the wealthiest women in America, who wear the most exquisite, the most expensive, and the most beautiful clothes in the world, Paris not excepted." In 1931, another writer said that the staircase at Thurn was a favorite location for fashionable brides because "its curve is perfect for trains and because so many brides get their white satin at Thurn's."

With its lease expiring, the Great Depression stubbornly persisting, and Hague having passed the benchmark retirement age of sixty-five. Thurn closed its doors for the last time in 1934.

== Design and fittings ==
(9) Afternoon dress with bands of cotton and metallic gold thread, early 1920s

(10) Asymmetrical silk evening dress printed with floral motif, 1932

In Hague's world, models were dress designs. She would buy a model in Paris to be recreated in Thurn's sewing rooms or she or one of her in-house designers would create original fashions for Thurn's customers. Customers would generally arrive by appointment. They would be met by a saleswoman, sometimes called a vendeuse, and, after stating what interests they had that day, would probably proceed up a curved stone staircase to view young women, called manikins, wearing a selection of the house's current designs. If a customer's body type was more like hers than like the slender young women's, Hague might take the role of manikin herself. Each dress normally required three hour-long fitting sessions before it was completed.

In 1922, Thurn placed an ad in Arts & Decoration magazine stating that its styles were "absolutely exclusive" enabling its customers to differentiate themselves from all other women. A year later, Hague described her role as designer: "I make each gown for some specific type of woman. I see her, in my imagination, long before I begin to choose fabrics or to sketch details. I begin to picture her while I study the style tendencies of the season, and when I review the early collections of the great Paris houses; ... a skilled designer can do much by subduing, emphasizing and supplementing, to develop new aspects of a woman's charm." Regarding the designs themselves, Hague said, "Thurn makes clothes for ladies. That is a hackneyed word I know. But how shall I put it? Our collections are always notably restrained... Our clothes are wearable. "That is why so many American women come to us, I think, instead of going to Paris for gowns."

Image Nos. 5 to 10, above, show examples of Thurn designs from 1910 to 1932. No. 5 shows a dress from an ensemble of about 1910 made of embroidered velvet. No. 6 shows a rose print silk dress from 1912 whose back has a large rhinestone buckle. The label on this dress reads "Thurn, Paris & New York". No. 7 shows a black silk underdress from 1914 having a velvet panel and black silk embroidery. No 8 shows a red velvet tubular dress from the early 1920s having dropped waistline and trimmed with metallic gold thread and red glass beads. No. 9 shows an afternoon dress made of silk with bands of cotton decorated with metallic gold thread. The bands that extend from shoulder to waist are of velvet. No. 10 shows an asymmetrical silk evening dress of silk crepe de chine, embroidered with metallic thread in floral pattern.

== Locations ==
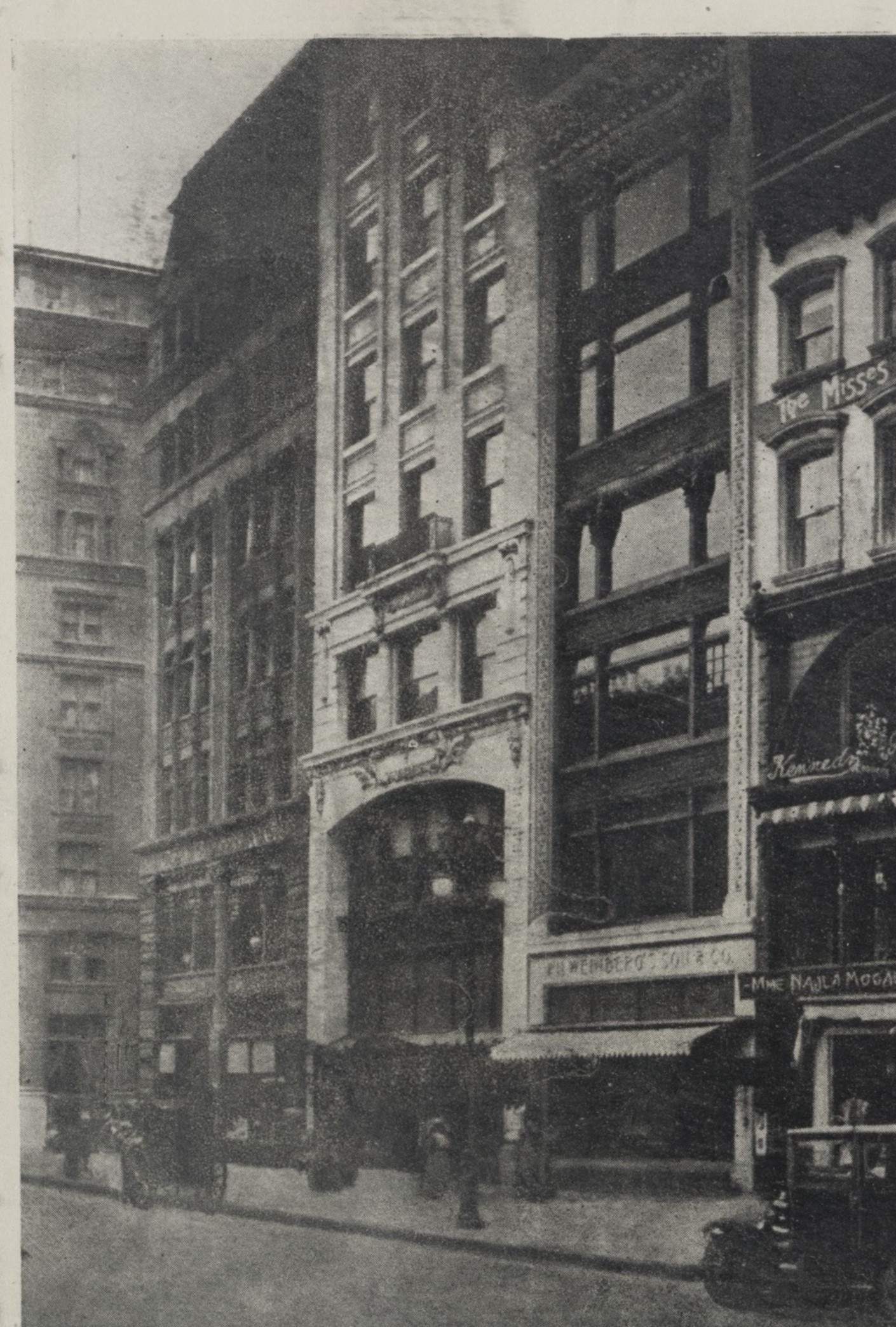
(13) 288 Fifth Avenue (white building at center), from: Fifth Avenue from Start to Finish by Burton F. Welles (New York, Welles & Co., 1911)

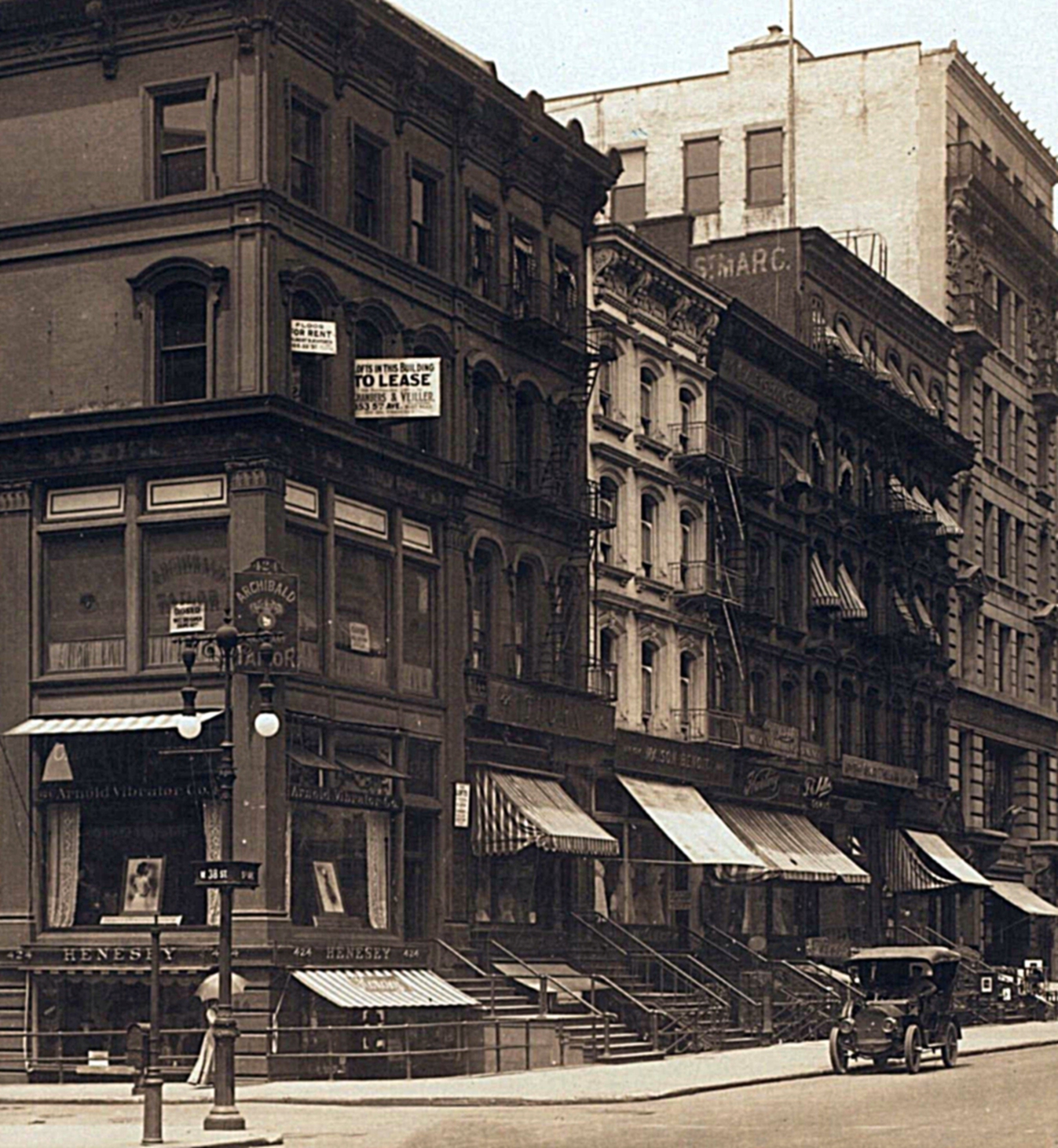
(14) 426 Fifth Avenue (white building at center) in 1907

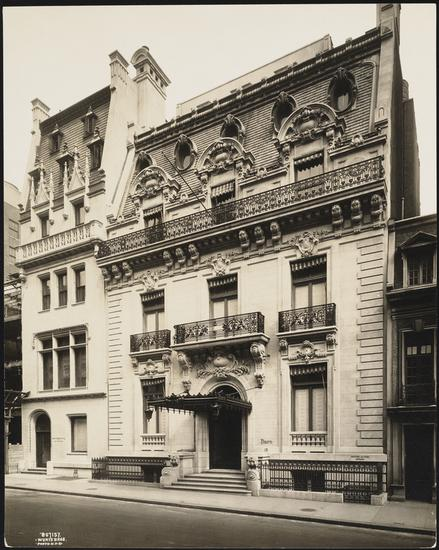
(15) 1925 Photo of the House of Thurn location at 15 East 52nd Street, by Wurts Brothers, New York

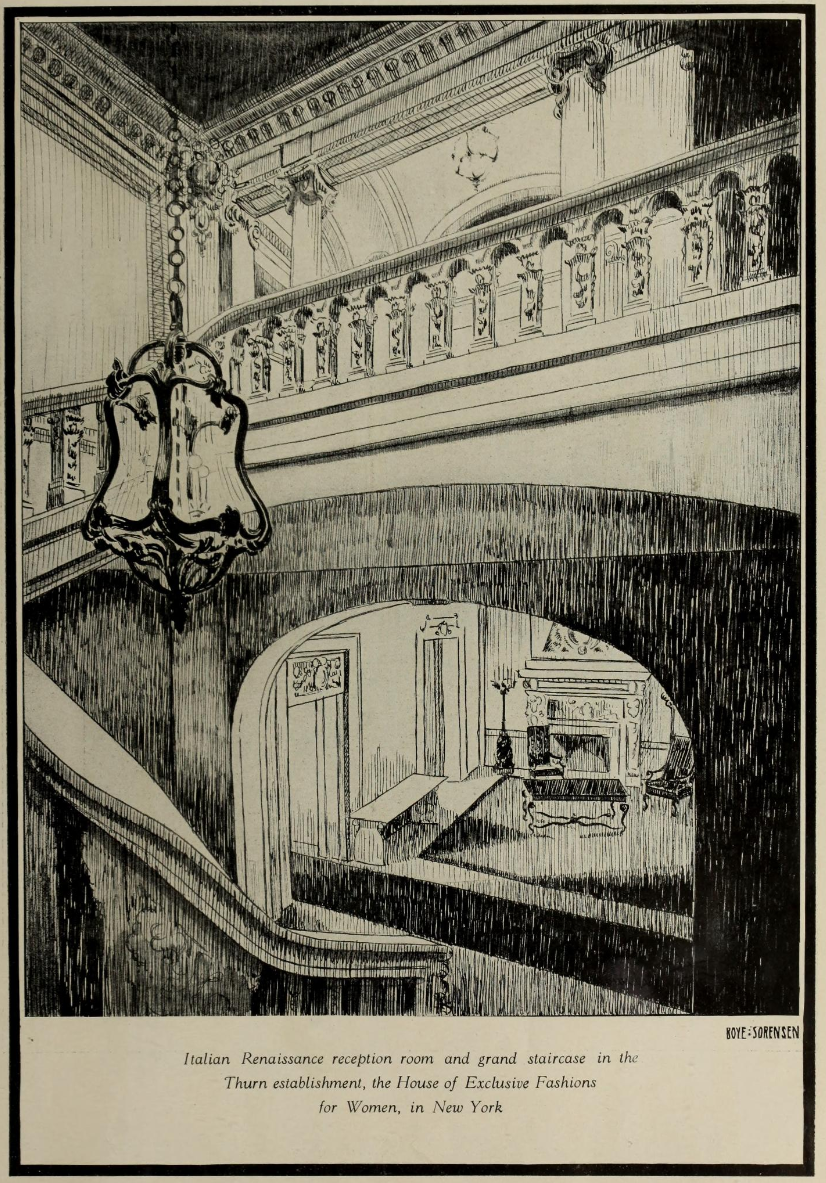
(16) Full page drawing by Boye Sorensen of the Thurn ground floor drawing room and staircase at 52 East 57th Street (Arts & Decoration, vol 19, no. 1, May 1923)

Before 1870, Thurn sold imported children's clothing from a small storefront in Brooklyn. In that year, it opened its first shop in Manhattan at 50 East 10th Street near Broadway. By 1873, it had moved further north to 884 Broadway. By 1881, it had obtained its first Fifth Avenue address, at storefront at number 288, close to the corner of Fifth and 29th Street (see Image No. 13, above). A few years later, Sidonie, who had previously held property jointly with her husband, bought him out to become sole owner. In 1888, Thurn opened a shop for the summer season in Newport, Rhode Island and continued in business there through the first decade of the twentieth century. In 1889 or 1890, Thurn again moved uptown in Manhattan, this time to 426 Fifth Avenue (see Image No. 14, above). In 1913, Thurn made its final move, opening in a mansion at 15 East 52nd Street owned by the man who named and then promoted Ivory Soap as "99 and 44/100 percent pure" (see Images No. 15 and 16, above). In announcing the lease, a writer for the Real Estate Record and Guide said, "the dwelling, built about eight years ago from plans by Donn Barber, is one of the finest in the city, all of the marble, woodwork, and decorations having been purchased abroad. Extensive alterations are to be made to the upper part of the building, but the main floor will be left as it is. The lease is for 21 years at an aggregate rental of $500,000." In 1922, a writer described Thurn as a stately establishment having "high-studded marble rooms" for "the exquisitely ordered display of women's and young girls' frocks, cloaks and hats, and of their filmy dessous and negligées as well."

== Collections at museums ==
Thurn fashions can be found in the collections of the Metropolitan Museum of Art Anna Wintour Costume Center, the Brooklyn Museum, the Los Angeles County Museum of Art, the Indianapolis Museum of Art, the Fashion Institute of Design Museum, the Hillwood Museum, and other collections.

== Biographies of Sidonie Thurn and Carolyn Hague ==
A baptism record of January 22, 1832, gives Sidonie's name as Caroline Sidonie Dittmarsch. The record names her father as Albert Ludwig Ditmarsch. It does not give her mother's name. The place of baptism was Dresden. A record of her parents' marriage gives her mother's name as Caroline Emilie Ranft. In applying for US citizenship in 1865, Sedonie again used Caroline Sidonie as her forenames, but for most of her life she used Sidonie as her first name. After her marriage to Leopold Thurn, she variously used Sidonie C. Thurn, Sidonie Caroline Thurn, Sidonie L. Thurn, or Mme. L. Thurn as her name. Sidonie and her husband Leopold had three children, Carolyn (born about 1866), Clara (born about 1867), and Theodore (born about 1870). Carolyn was known at first as Lilly (also spelled Lilli or Lillie) and later as Carolyn or Caroline. One source gives her forename and initials as Lilly O. A., another gives Lillie Ottilie as her forenames, and a third lists her as Caroline Ottillie Albertine Thurn. Her obituary and most accounts published during her adulthood call her Carolyn.

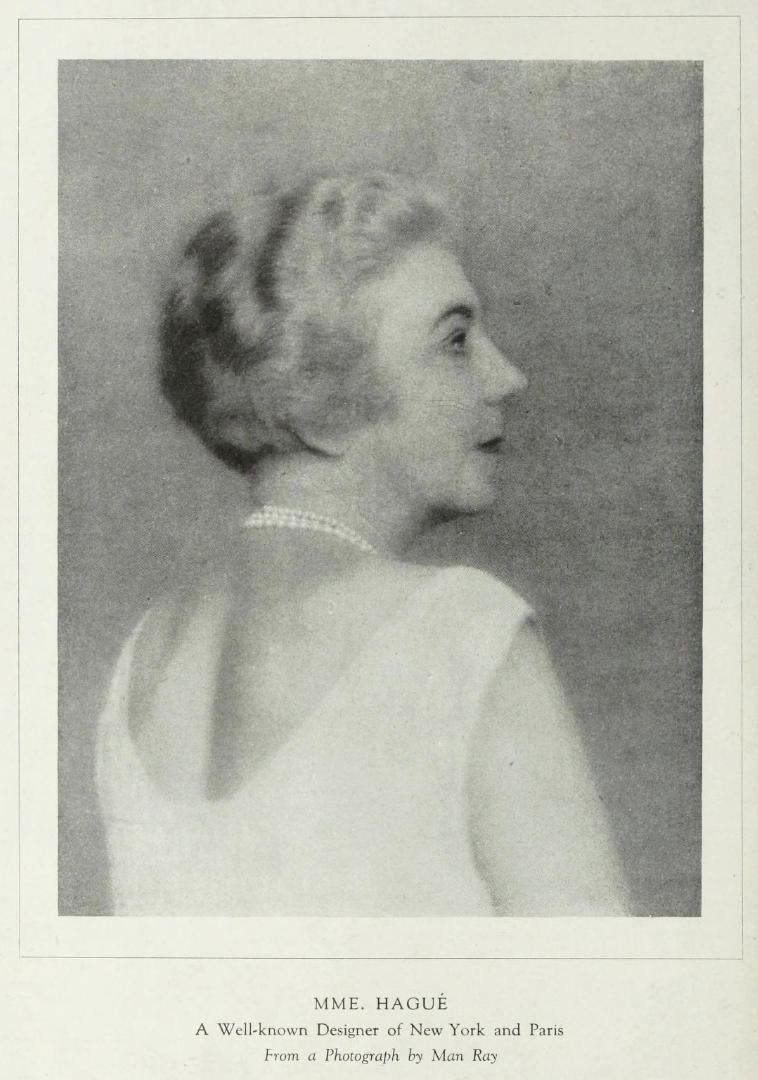
Portrait of Madame Hague by Man Ray, Arts & Decoration vo. 20, no. 3, January 1924, p. 50

In 1886, Hague married Ernest Hague in a civil ceremony performed by New York's reform mayor William Russell Grace. Ernest Hague, or Hagué, was a Paris-born artist who worked as a draper and designer for the Thurn shop at 426 Fifth Avenue. Although he had spent his early years in London, he could not speak English (and was therefore assigned an interpreter at his civil wedding). The couple had two children, Alfred (born in 1887) and Emil (born in 1888). The family lived in the same building as the Thurn salon. The marriage was dissolved in 1896. In 1901, Hague married Adolf Windmuller, the son of a prominent New York merchant who chose to have no occupation (his stepson wrote that he was a "ne'er-do-well playboy"). There were no children from this marriage. By that time, Sidonie was no longer living in the same building as the store and had a townhouse at 30 West 36th Street where Hague and Adolf joined her.

Thurn's success enabled Hague and her mother to achieve an upper-middle-class lifestyle. One marker of their wealth can be seen in the luxury automobiles Hague purchased. One of the first was a 1908 Rolls-Royce Silver Ghost. She followed that with another Silver Ghost in 1914, and a 1915 Cadillac Roadster. She subsequently owned a Duesenberg Model J, and several Packard models.

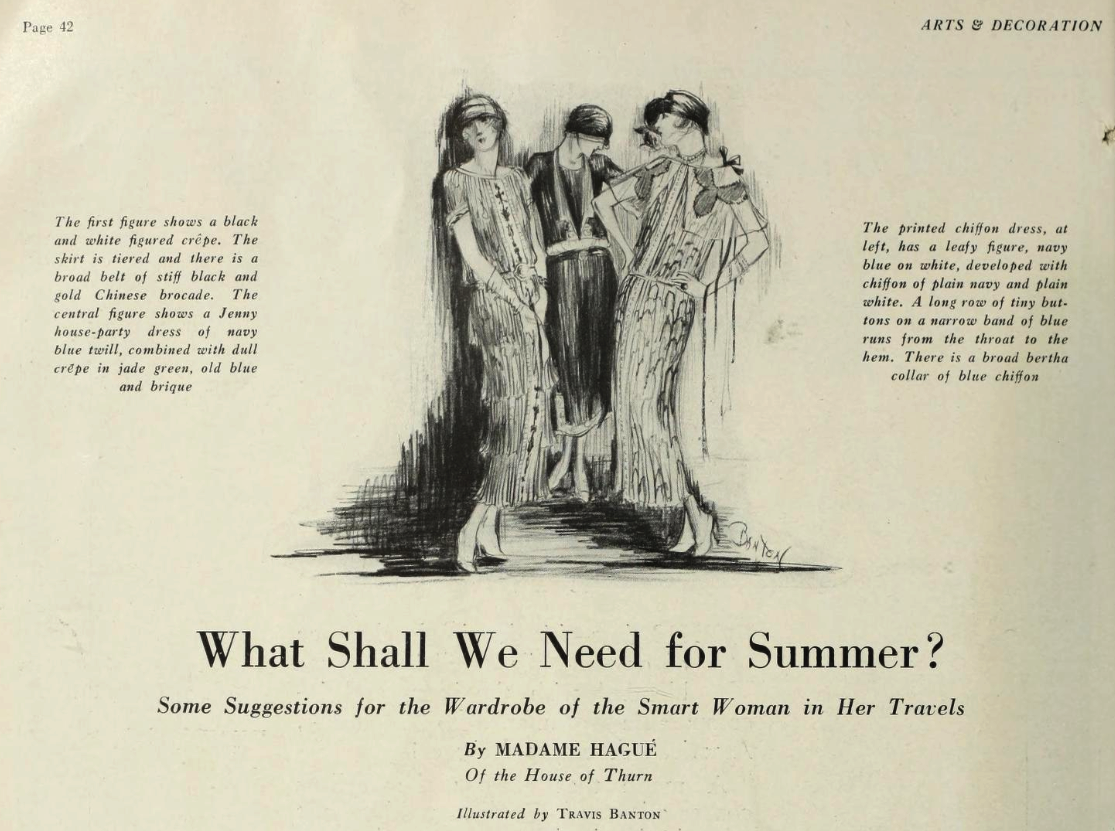
Heading of an article by Madame Hague, Arts & Decoration, vol. 19, no. 2, April 1923, p. 42

Writers interviewed Hague in 1922 and 1923. She gave the first of them a fashion forecast for the fall season saying that she was emphasizing ankle-length skirts while the Paris houses favored were "notably, even audaciously, short of skirt". The second interview focused on the discipline Hague followed to keep "mentally and physically active." She reported that she took an exercise class most mornings, and in her free time "rather than ... attending a concert, I visit a picture gallery or a quaint shop filled with old, beautifully designed furniture." The third opens with this: "What is she like you are going to ask me, I for suppose, every woman who loves beautiful things is just a little curious about the woman who makes things as beautiful as Thurn's." In it, Hague says of her customers, "They trust me, most of them, to choose gowns for them. They trust me so much, often, that they are afraid to go elsewhere, for fear of finding themselves in a gown that is not for them."

Early in the 1920s, Hague wrote articles on women's fashions for Arts & Decoration magazine.

After 1934, while in her 70s, Hague headed the made-to-order department of a large women's specialty store called Jay-Thorpe. On leaving Jay-Thorpe, she retired to a large estate in Colorado Springs, Colorado. She died there on July 19, 1954.
