= Taufkirchen (Vils) =

- Municipality
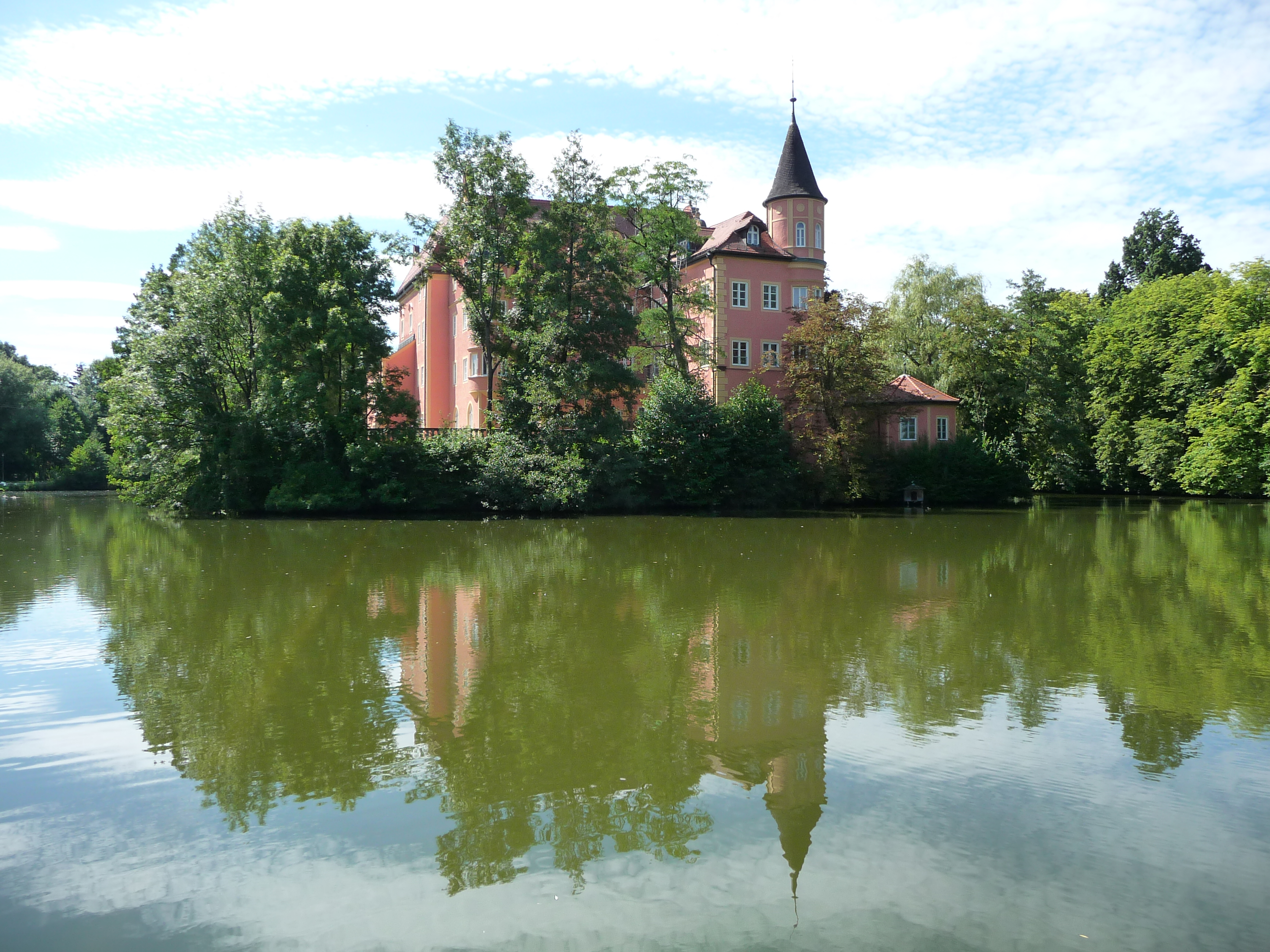
- Wasserschloss Taufkirchen

- Coat of arms

- Location of Taufkirchen within Erding district
- Interactive map of Taufkirchen
- Location within Germany Location within Bavaria
- Coordinates: 48°20′38″N 12°7′49″E
- Country: Germany
- State: Bavaria
- Admin. region: Oberbayern
- District: Erding

Government
  - Mayor (2020–26): Stefan Haberl (CSU)

Area
  - Total: 70.18 km^{2} (27.10 sq mi)
- Elevation: 466 m (1,529 ft)

Population (2025-12-31)
  - Total: 10,705
  - Density: 152.5/km^{2} (395.1/sq mi)
- Time zone: UTC+01:00 (CET)
  - Summer (DST): UTC+02:00 (CEST)
- Postal codes: 84416
- Dialling codes: 08084
- Vehicle registration: ED
- Website: www.taufkirchen.de

Taufkirchen (German pronunciation: [taʊfˈkɪʁçn̩]; Central Bavarian: Dafkirch) is a municipality in the district of Erding in Bavaria in Germany.

Taufkirchen is the location of the Wasserschloss Taufkirchen, a moated castle over 700 years old.
