= Neustadt station =

Neustadt station may refer to:

== Austria ==
- Wiener Neustadt Hauptbahnhof, the main station in Wiener Neustadt, Lower Austria
- Wiener Neustadt North station, in Wiener Neustadt, Lower Austria

== Germany ==
- Neustadt (Holst) station, in Neustadt in Holstein, Schleswig-Holstein
- Neustadt (Sachs) station, in Neustadt, Saxony
- Neustadt (Schwarzw) station, in Titisee-Neustadt, Baden-Württemberg
- Neustadt (Weinstraße) Hauptbahnhof, the central station in Neustadt, Rhineland-Palatinate
- Neustadt am Rübenberge station, in Neustadt am Rübenberge, Lower Saxony
- Neustadt-Glewe station, in Neustadt-Glewe, Mecklenburg-Vorpommern
- Bad Neustadt (Saale) station, in Bad Neustadt (Saale), Bavaria
- Bremen Neustadt station, in Bremen
- Dresden-Neustadt station, in Dresden, Saxony
- Hoyerswerda-Neustadt station, in Hoyerswerda, Saxony
- Magdeburg-Neustadt station, in Magdeburg, Saxony-Anhalt

== See also ==
- Neustadt/Weinstrasse Railway Museum, in Neustadt an der Weinstraße station, Rhineland-Palatinate, Germany
- Neustadt (disambiguation)
