= Kottingbrunn railway station =

Railway station in Lower Austria

Kottingbrunn
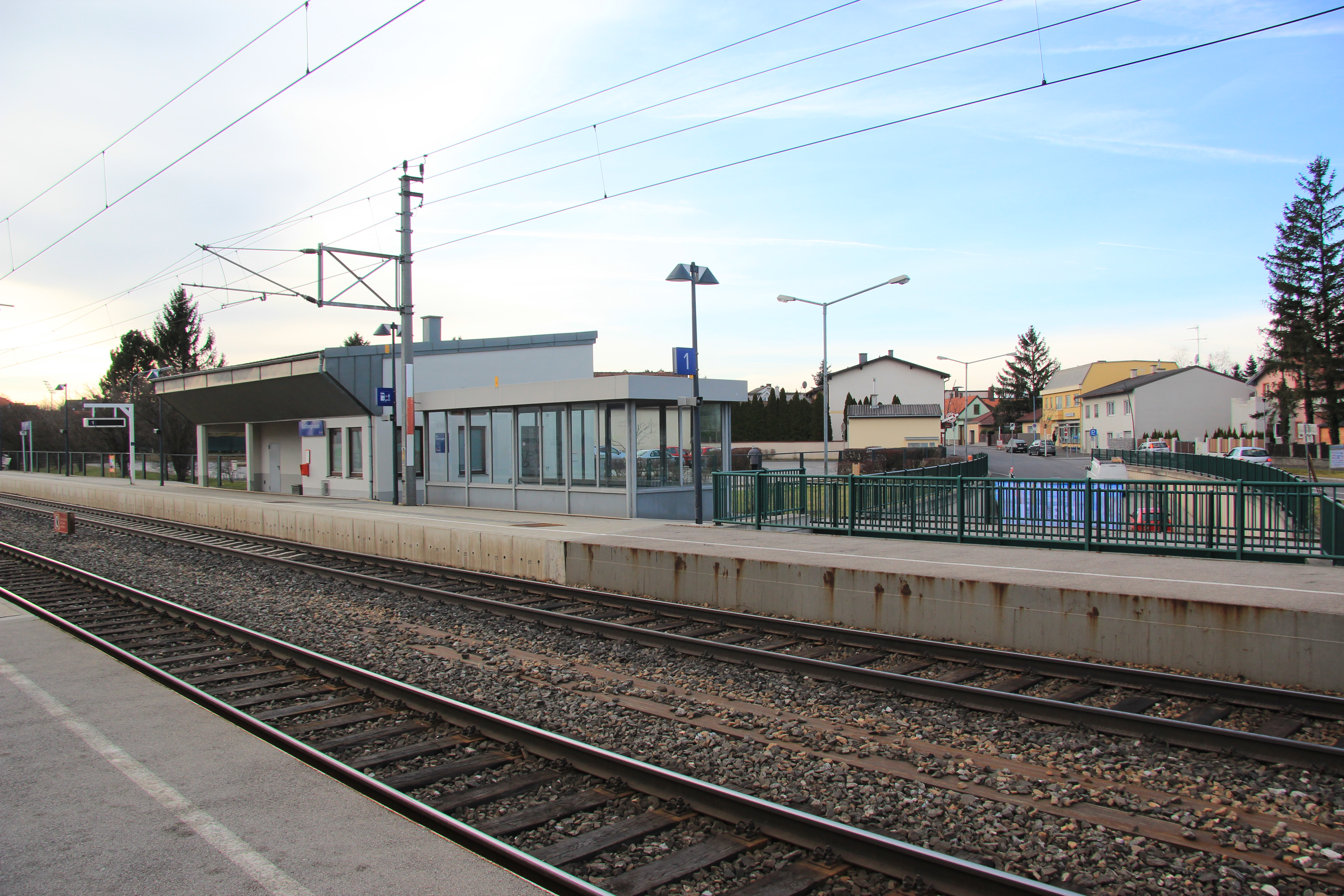

General information
- Location: Wr. Neustädter Straße 1; 2542 Kottingbrunn; Austria
- Coordinates: 47°57′01″N 16°13′37″E
- Owner: ÖBB
- Operator: ÖBB
- Platforms: 2 side
- Tracks: 2

Services
Preceding station	Vienna S-Bahn	Following station
Leobersdorf towards Wiener Neustadt Hbf	S3	Bad Vöslau towards Hollabrunn
Leobersdorf towards Wiener Neustadt Hbf	S4	Bad Vöslau towards Absdorf-Hippersdorf
Location
- Location within Austria

Kottingbrunn is a railway station serving the town of Kottingbrunn in Lower Austria.
