= Gumpoldskirchen railway station =

Railway station in Lower Austria

Gumpoldskirchen
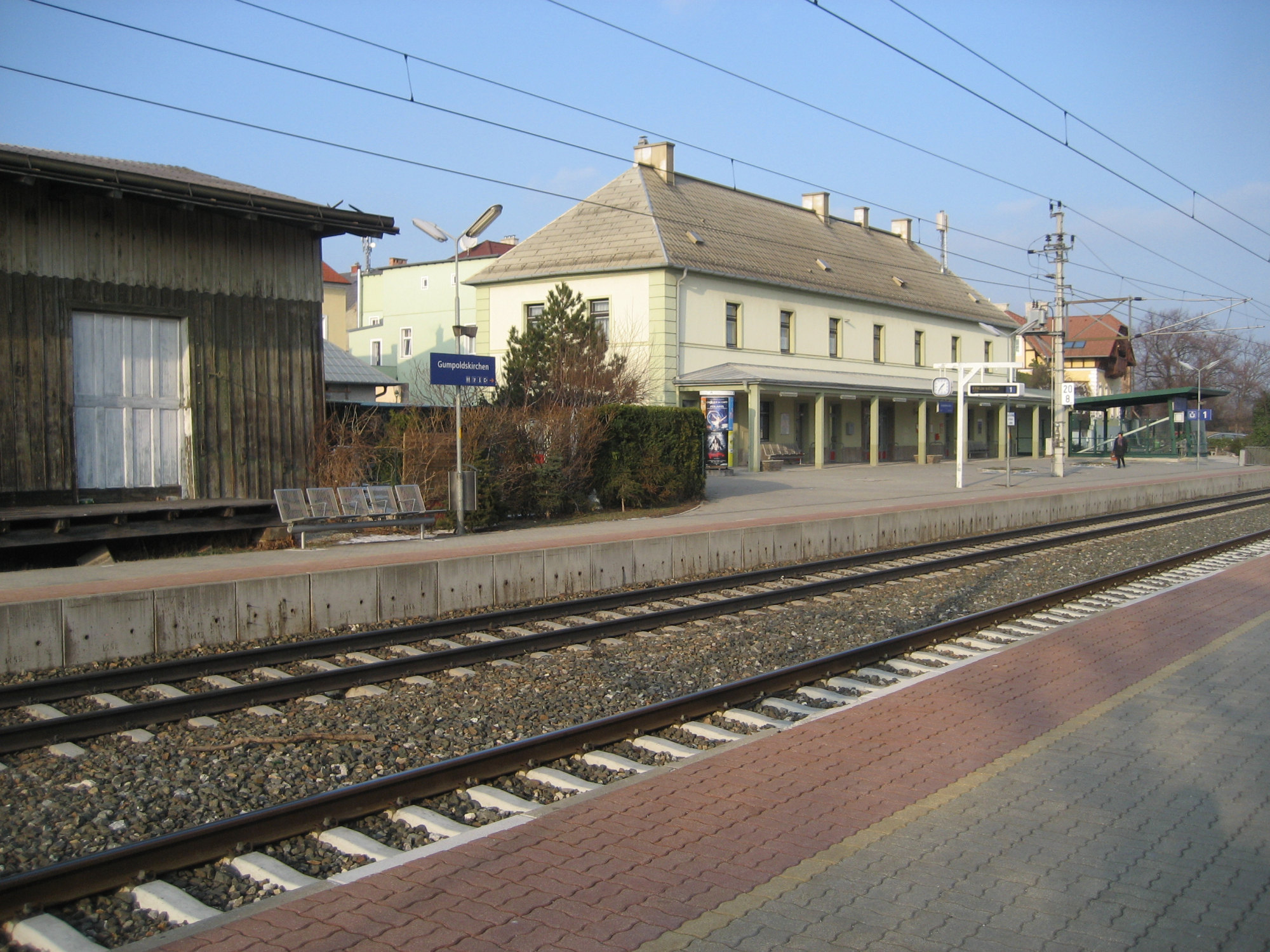

General information
- Location: Bahngasse 1; 2352 Gumpoldskirchen; Austria
- Coordinates: 48°02′29″N 16°17′07″E
- Owner: ÖBB
- Operator: ÖBB
- Platforms: 2 side
- Tracks: 2

Services
Preceding station	Vienna S-Bahn	Following station
Pfaffstätten towards Wiener Neustadt Hbf	S3	Guntramsdorf-Thallern towards Hollabrunn
Pfaffstätten towards Wiener Neustadt Hbf	S4	Guntramsdorf-Thallern towards Absdorf-Hippersdorf
Location
- Location within Austria

Gumpoldskirchen is a railway station in the town of Gumpoldskirchen in Lower Austria.
