= Baden bei Wien railway station =

Railway station in Lower Austria

Baden
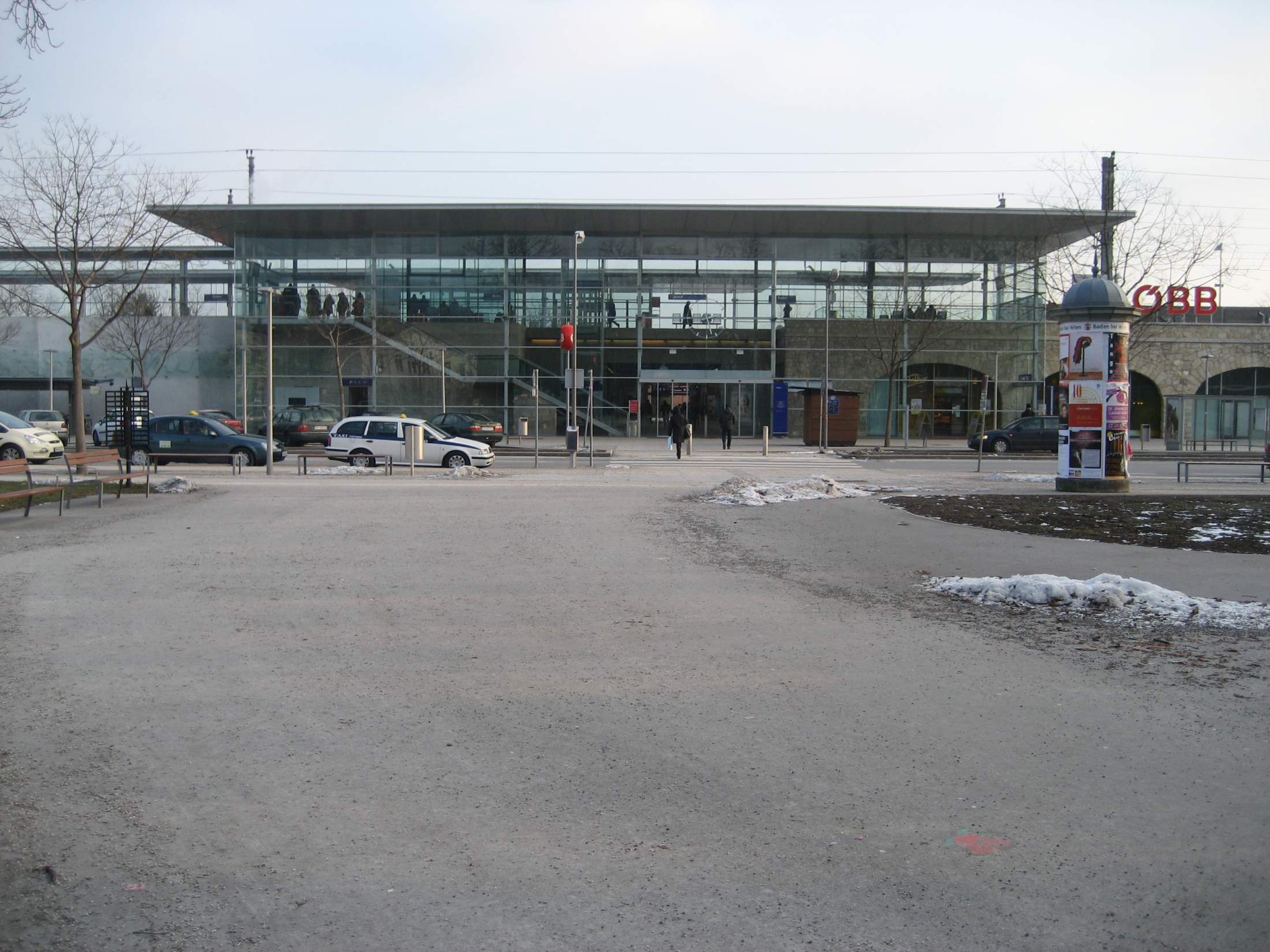

General information
- Location: Conrad v. Hötzendorfplatz 1; 2500 Baden; Austria
- Coordinates: 48°00′15″N 16°14′34″E
- Owner: ÖBB
- Operator: ÖBB
- Platforms: 2 side
- Tracks: 2

Services
Preceding station	Vienna S-Bahn	Following station
Bad Vöslau towards Wiener Neustadt Hbf	S3	Pfaffstätten towards Hollabrunn
Bad Vöslau towards Wiener Neustadt Hbf	S4	Pfaffstätten towards Absdorf-Hippersdorf
Location
- Location within Austria

Baden is a railway station serving the town of Baden in Lower Austria. The terminus of the Wiener Lokalbahn is located nearby the station.

The composer Karel Komzák II died after attempting to jump onto a departing train at the station in 1905.
