= Pfaffstätten railway station =

Railway station in Lower Austria

Pfaffstätten
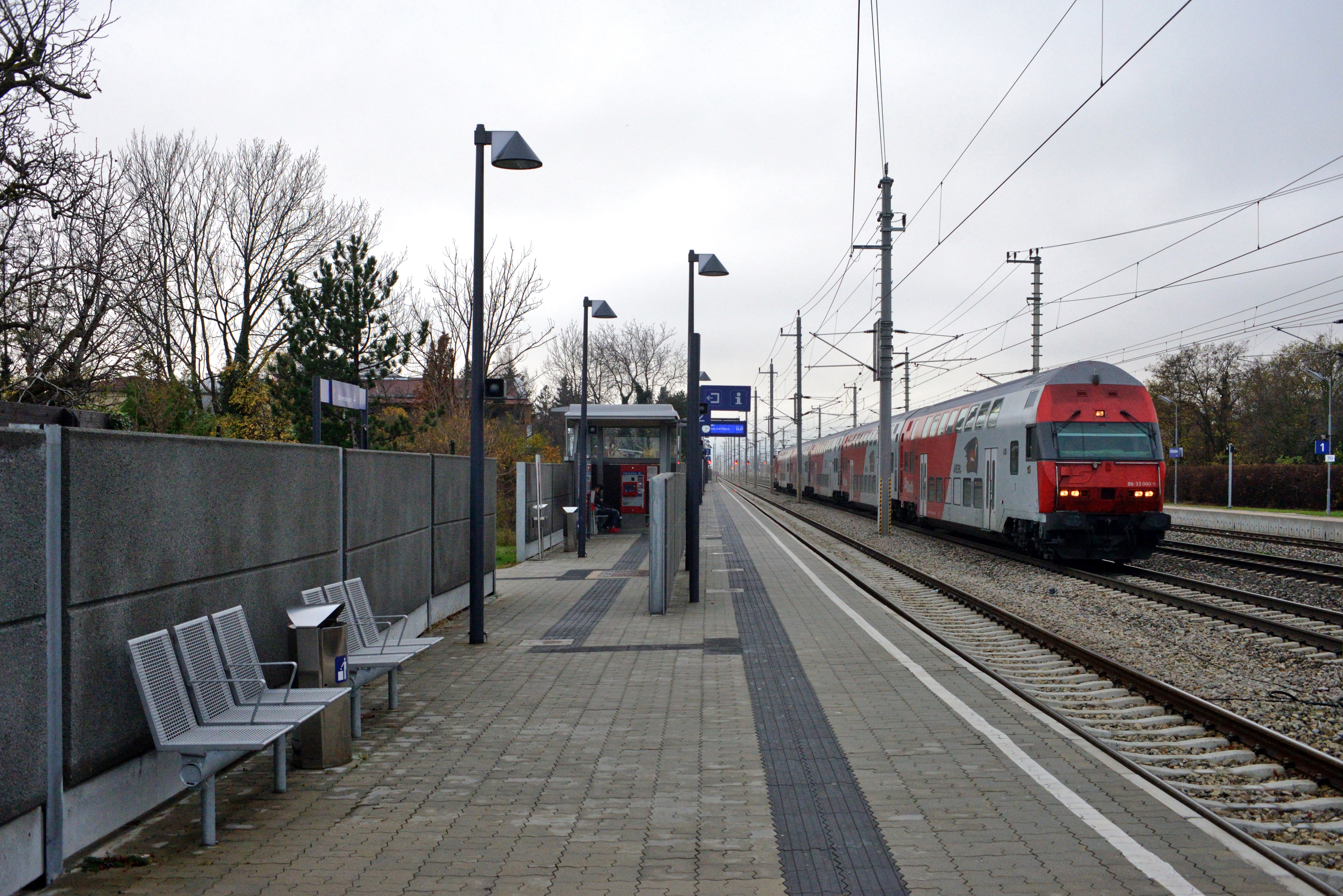

General information
- Location: Einödstraße 1; 2511 Pfaffstätten; Austria
- Coordinates: 48°01′06″N 16°15′32″E
- Owner: ÖBB
- Operator: ÖBB
- Platforms: 2 side
- Tracks: 4

Services
Preceding station	Vienna S-Bahn	Following station
Baden bei Wien towards Wiener Neustadt Hbf	S3	Gumpoldskirchen towards Hollabrunn
Baden bei Wien towards Wiener Neustadt Hbf	S4	Gumpoldskirchen towards Absdorf-Hippersdorf
Location
- Location within Austria

Pfaffstätten is a railway station in the town of Pfaffstätten in Lower Austria.
