= Felixdorf railway station =

Railway station in Lower Austria

Felixdorf
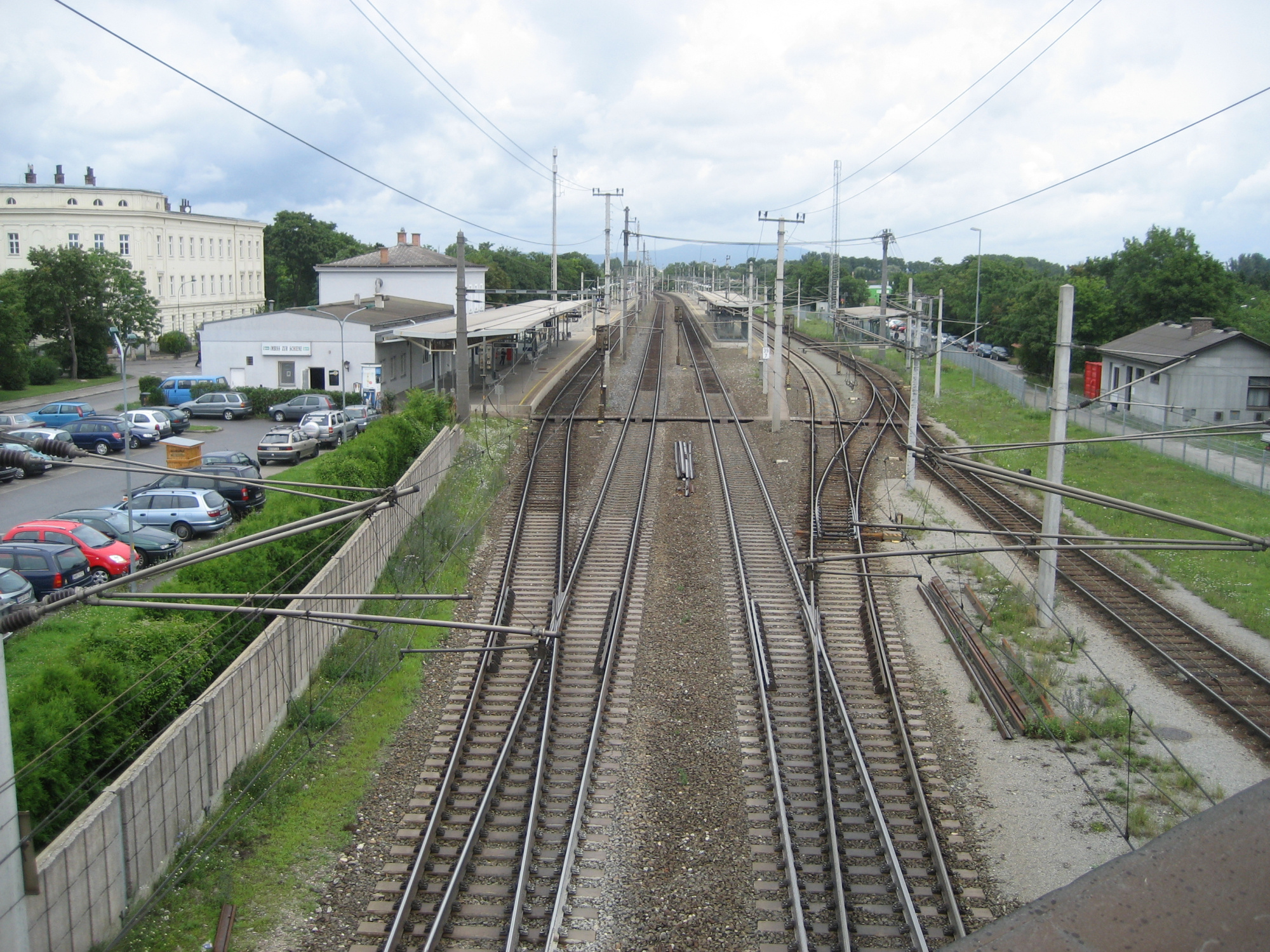

General information
- Location: Mühlgasse 2; 2603 Felixdorf; Austria
- Coordinates: 47°53′14″N 16°14′53″E
- Owner: ÖBB
- Operator: ÖBB
- Platforms: 1 island 1 side
- Tracks: 4

Services
Preceding station	Vienna S-Bahn	Following station
Theresienfeld towards Wiener Neustadt Hbf	S3	Sollenau towards Hollabrunn
Theresienfeld towards Wiener Neustadt Hbf	S4	Sollenau towards Absdorf-Hippersdorf
Location
- Location within Austria

Felixdorf is a railway station serving the town of Felixdorf in Lower Austria.
