= Theresienfeld railway station =

Railway station in Lower Austria

Theresienfeld
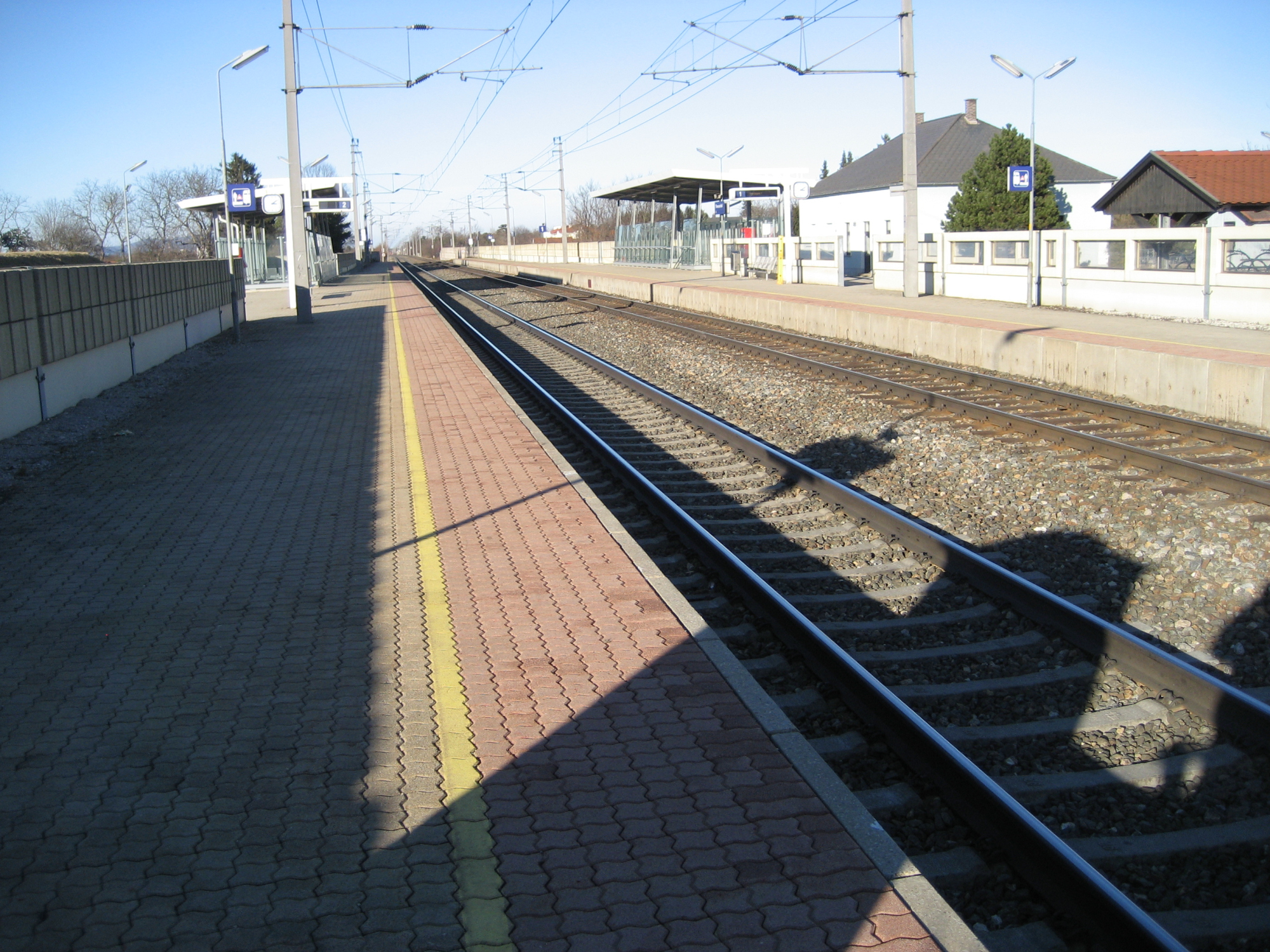

General information
- Location: Bahnstraße 11; 2604 Theresienfeld; Austria
- Coordinates: 47°51′39″N 16°14′39″E
- Owner: ÖBB
- Operator: ÖBB
- Platforms: 2
- Tracks: 2

Services
Preceding station	Vienna S-Bahn	Following station
Wiener Neustadt North towards Wiener Neustadt Hbf	S3	Felixdorf towards Hollabrunn
Wiener Neustadt North towards Wiener Neustadt Hbf	S4	Felixdorf towards Absdorf-Hippersdorf
Location
- Location within Austria

Theresienfeld is a railway station serving the town of Theresienfeld in Lower Austria.
