= Sollenau railway station =

Railway station in Lower Austria

Sollenau
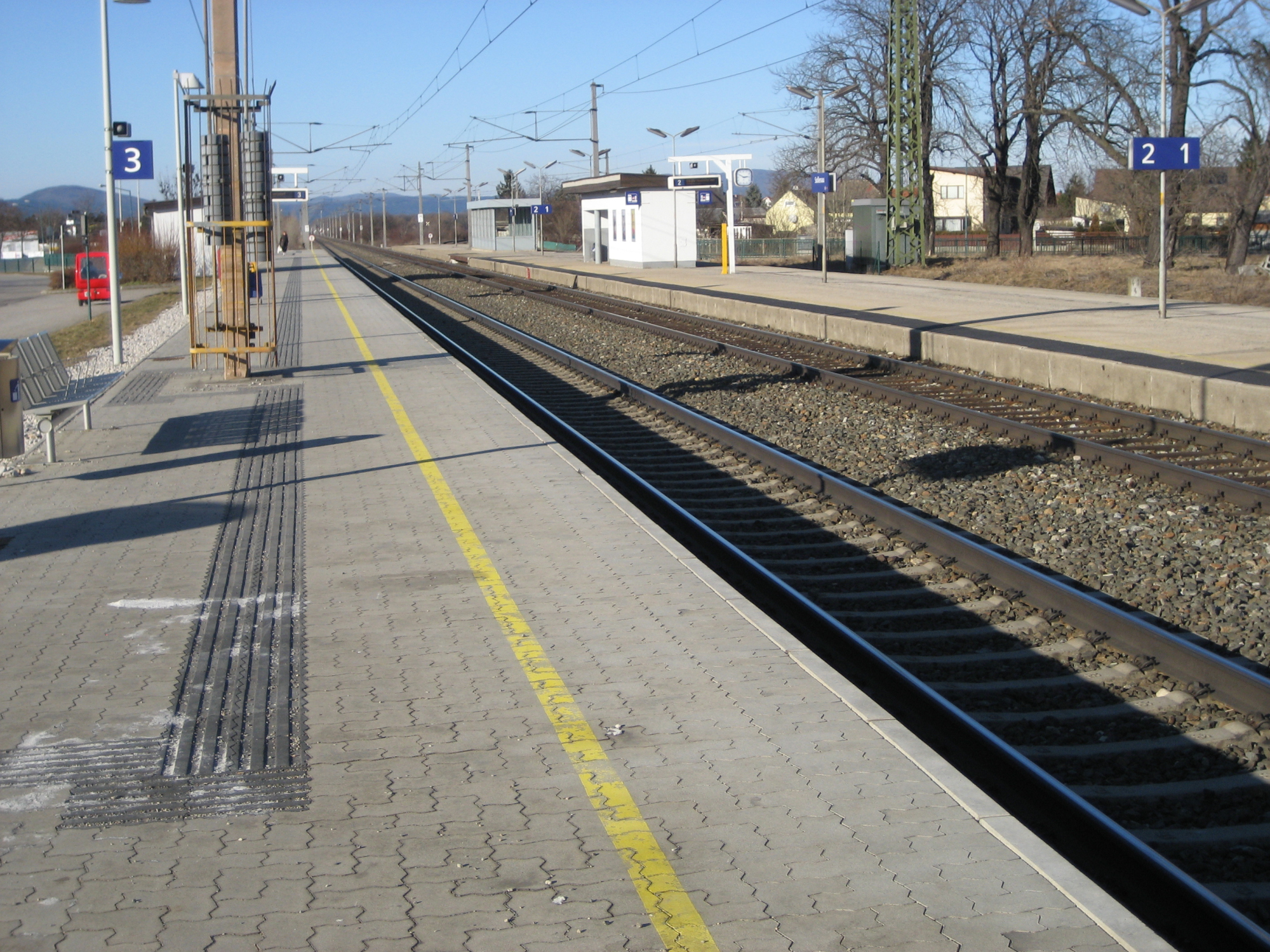

General information
- Location: Friedhofstraße; 2601 Sollenau; Austria
- Coordinates: 47°53′55″N 16°14′44″E
- Owner: ÖBB
- Operator: ÖBB
- Platforms: 1 island 1 side
- Tracks: 3

Services
Preceding station	Vienna S-Bahn	Following station
Felixdorf towards Wiener Neustadt Hbf	S3	Leobersdorf towards Hollabrunn
Felixdorf towards Wiener Neustadt Hbf	S4	Leobersdorf towards Absdorf-Hippersdorf
Location
- Location within Austria

Sollenau is a railway station serving the town of Sollenau in Lower Austria.
