= Schneebergbahn =

Schneebergbahn may refer to:

- Schneeberg Railway a railway network in Austria that includes the:
- Schneeberg Railway (cog railway), a rack railway up the Schneeberg mountain near Vienna, Austria.
