= Leobersdorf railway station =

Railway station in Lower Austria

Leobersdorf
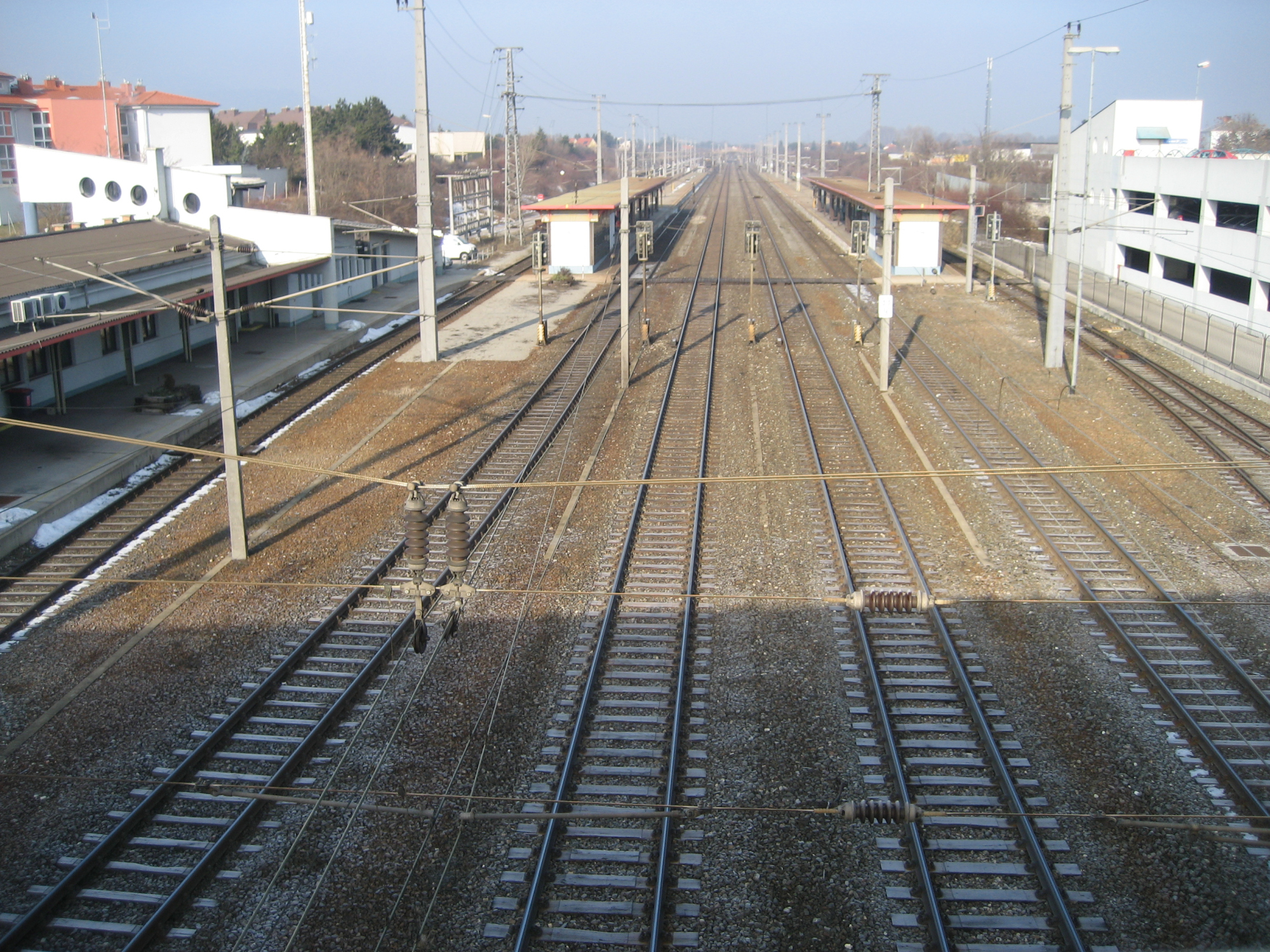

General information
- Location: Bahnhofplatz 3; 2544 Leobersdorf; Austria
- Coordinates: 47°56′18″N 16°13′52″E
- Owner: ÖBB
- Operator: ÖBB
- Platforms: 2 island
- Tracks: 6

Services
Preceding station	Vienna S-Bahn	Following station
Sollenau towards Wiener Neustadt Hbf	S3	Kottingbrunn towards Hollabrunn
Sollenau towards Wiener Neustadt Hbf	S4	Kottingbrunn towards Absdorf-Hippersdorf
Location
- Location within Austria

Leobersdorf is a railway station serving the town of Leobersdorf in Lower Austria.
