= Bad Vöslau railway station =

Railway station in Lower Austria

Bad Vöslau
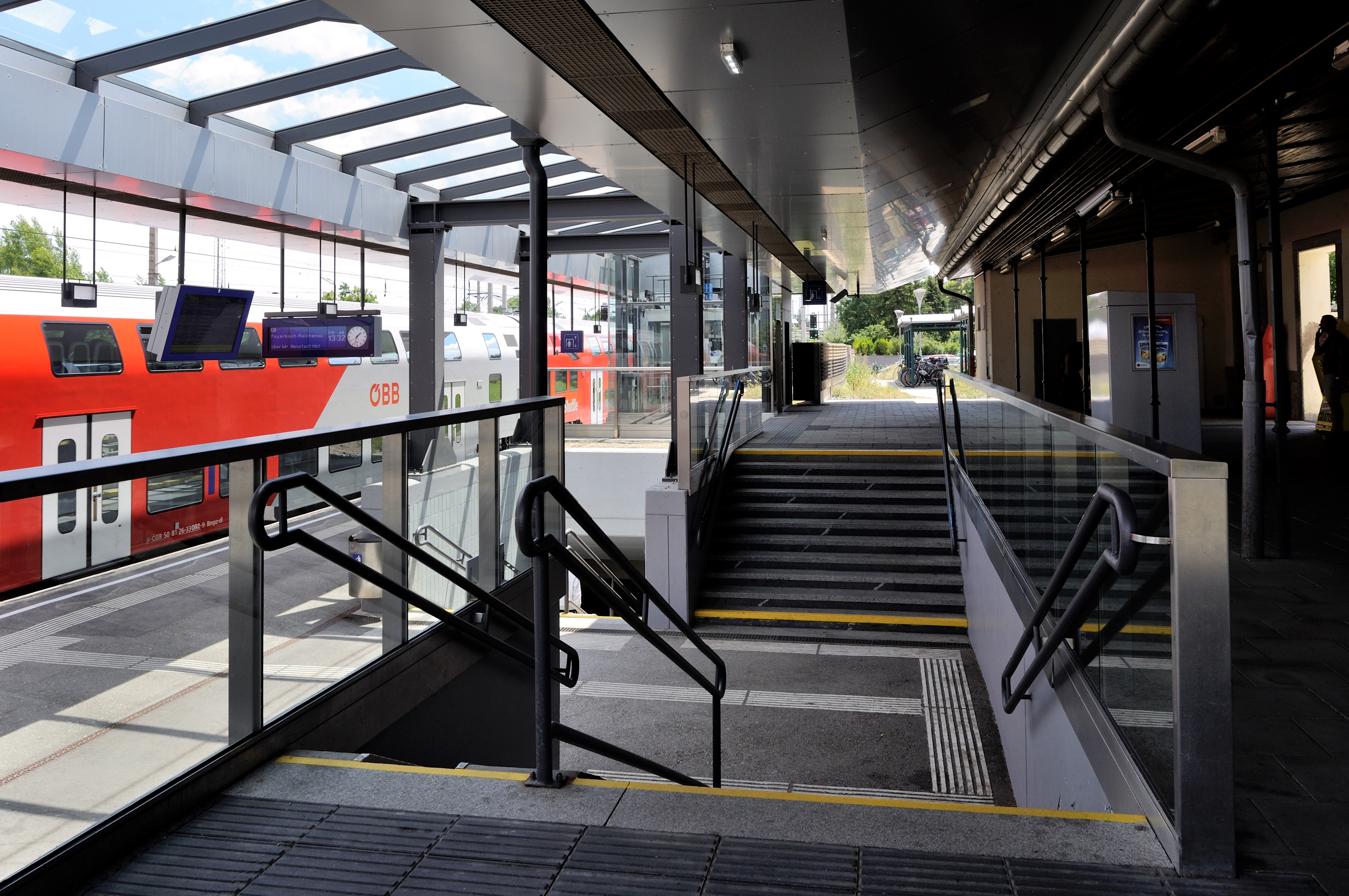

General information
- Location: Castelligasse 2; 2540 Bad Vöslau; Austria
- Coordinates: 47°58′12″N 16°13′26″E
- Owner: ÖBB
- Operator: ÖBB
- Platforms: 1 side 1 island
- Tracks: 6

Services
Preceding station	Vienna S-Bahn	Following station
Kottingbrunn towards Wiener Neustadt Hbf	S3	Baden bei Wien towards Hollabrunn
Kottingbrunn towards Wiener Neustadt Hbf	S4	Baden bei Wien towards Absdorf-Hippersdorf
Location
- Location within Austria

Bad Vöslau is a railway station serving the town of Bad Vöslau in Lower Austria.
