= Karel Komzák I =

Bohemian composer, organist and conductor (1823 - 1893)

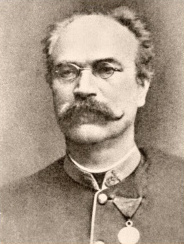
Karel Komzák I

Karel Komzák I (4 November 1823 – 19 March 1893) was a Bohemian composer, organist, bandmaster and conductor. He was the father of Karel Komzák II and the grandfather of Karel Komzák III.

== Biography ==
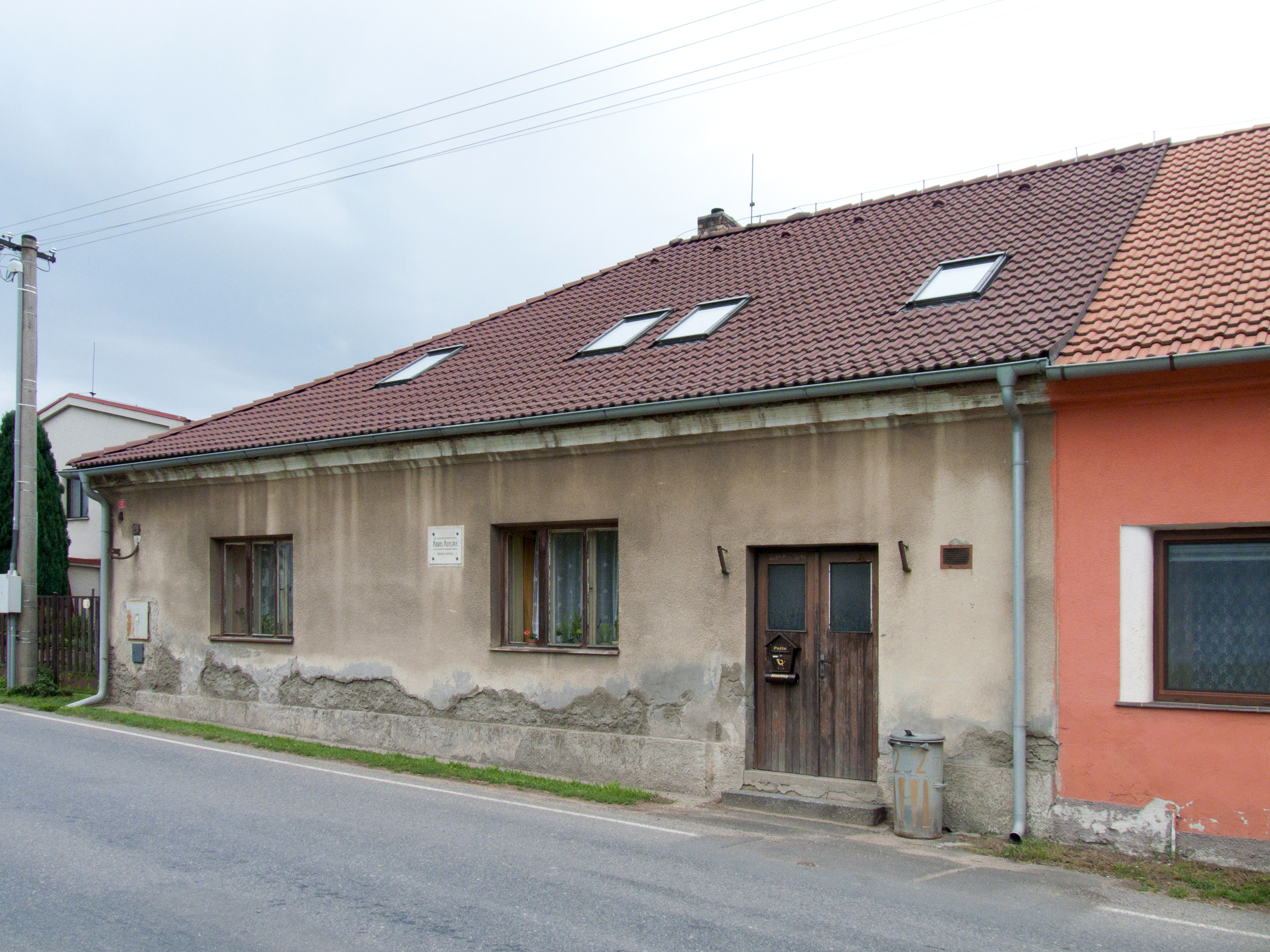
Komzák's family home in Netěchovice

Karel Komzák was born in 1823 in Netěchovice, near Týn nad Vltavou, now in the České Budějovice District of the Czech Republic. A memorial plaque now commemorates his birthplace. He learned the violin from his father, a blacksmith but also a popular folk singer and acclaimed violinist, and studied with Moritz Mildner and Antonín Bennewitz at the Prague Conservatory. He studied at the School for Organists and became a village teacher. Later he was an organist at a lunatic asylum, the National Institute for the Mentally Ill, where he worked for 19 years. He was also a bandmaster of the Rifle Corps in Prague and a theatre conductor in Linz. He moved around frequently, staying longest at Vienna and Baden.

He formed a well-respected orchestra for opera performances at the Czech Provisional Theatre. In 1862 it was permanently attached to the Theatre. Among its players were Antonín Dvořák (viola) and the composer's own son Karel Komzák II (violin). He was succeeded in this post by Bedřich Smetana.

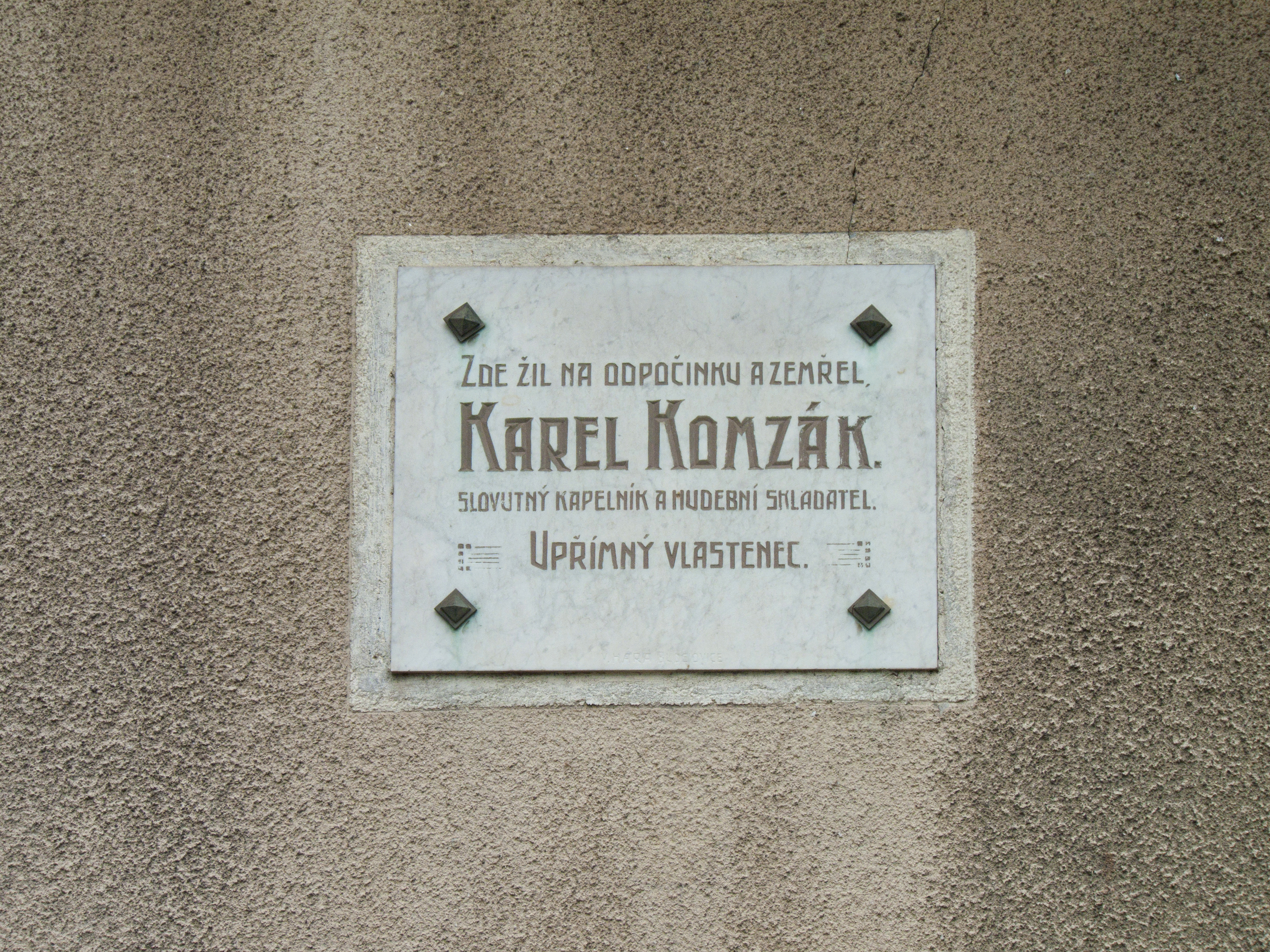
Memorial plaque at Komzák's birthplace

In 1865 Komzák was appointed bandmaster in the 11th Infantry Regiment of the Austro-Hungarian Army in Innsbruck. He served in this post for the next 15 years in a variety of locations.

In 1876 he declined an offer to conduct at the World Exhibition in Chicago, followed by a concert tour of Boston, Washington and New York.

In 1880 he moved to the 74th Infantry Regiment. Up until this time, he had warmed the hearts of his listeners by regularly including Czech folk songs in his concert programs, but from 1880 this music was forbidden. He retired in 1881, but only a year later was persuaded to join the newly formed 88th Infantry Regiment in Prague as a bandmaster. He retired in April 1888 to his birthplace, where he died in 1893, aged 69.

He wrote more than 200 popular marches, waltzes, mazurkas, polkas, galops, quadrilles and other dances.
