= Karel Komzák II =

Czech conductor, composer and choirmaster

Karel Komzák's father and son were also composers named Karel Komzák.

Karel Komzák II (8 November 1850 – 23 April 1905) was a Bohemian-born Viennese composer famous for his dances and marches. He composed the Erzherzog-Albrecht-Marsch.

Komzák was born in Prague in 1850. After training under his father, Karel Komzák I, he studied violin, musical theory, and conducting at the Prague Conservatory between 1861 and 1867. In March 1869, he joined his father's 11th Regiment band at Linz, playing violin and baritone.

When the position of bandmaster to the 7th Infantry Regiment became vacant in 1871, Komzák applied and was successful, taking up his new post at Innsbruck at the age of 21. During this period the so-called Bohemian musician became familiar with the folk music of Tyrol, and this showed its influence in the choruses he wrote for the Innsbruck Liedertafel Choir, of which he was also choirmaster.

Komzák's long-standing desire to come to Vienna was eventually fulfilled in 1882, when he was called to the capital to take over the duties of bandmaster to the 84th Infantry Regiment. It was while he was with this regiment that his fame gradually spread throughout the Austrian Empire. His congenial appearance, friendly nature and energetic conducting soon made him a favourite of the Viennese public, who regarded him as one of the leading military composers.

An important contribution of Komzák to the development of Austrian military music was his use of stringed instruments. His band contained no less than fourteen first violins and could therefore be compared favourably with the usual concert orchestra of the period. The frequent and widespread tours undertaken by Komzák with his regimental orchestra were everywhere received with popular acclaim.

In 1892, Komzák was given leave of absence from his regiment on health grounds and the family moved to the spa town of Baden-bei-Wien, fourteen miles (23 km) southwest of Vienna, where the following year he took over direction of the Spa Orchestra. In the meantime, on 20 September 1892, he gave a farewell concert in Vienna with the band which was being moved to the regiment's new garrison at Mostar, Herzegovina. Komzák retained the position of bandmaster until his eventual retirement in 1896, spending the winter months with the regiment in Mostar and returning to Baden in the spring to direct the season's spa concerts. Probably the climax of his career was the series of concerts he gave with the Wiener Farben Orchestra at the World Exhibition in St. Louis, Missouri in 1904.

Only six months later, Komzák died on Easter Sunday, 23 April 1905, aged only 54. In attempting to jump onto a departing train at Baden bei Wien railway station he slipped and fell under the wheels. He was buried at Baden, but in the following November his remains were exhumed and transferred to the Vienna Central Cemetery, where he was given an honorable grave by the city authorities. A monument, showing the composer with baton in hand, was erected on his grave in 1907.

His son Karel Komzák III (1878 – 1924) was also a composer.
