= Erzherzog-Albrecht-Marsch =

German military march, composed by Karel Komzák II

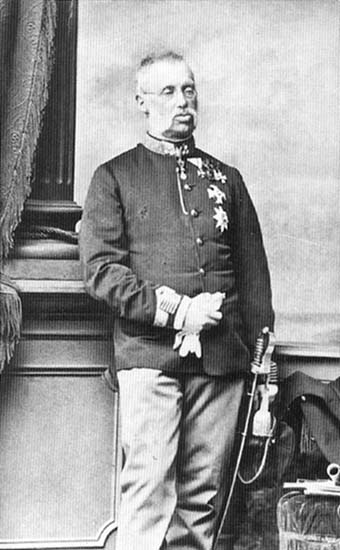
Archduke Albrecht, Duke of Teschen

The Archduke Albrecht March (German: "Erzherzog-Albrecht-Marsch") is an Austro-Hungarian military march, composed by Karel Komzák II (also known as Karl Komzák) as his opus 136. It was named in honour of Archduke Albrecht, Duke of Teschen (1817–1895).

The march was used extensively by the German forces in World War I and World War II, especially during the departures and arrivals of U-boats. It is still used by the Bundesmarine when greeting a warship back to port from a mission. The march is also used by the Chilean Navy during military parades or marches.

Introduction

== In popular culture ==
- The march is played during departure from, and return to, La Rochelle in the film Das Boot, shortly before the U-96 is bombed at port.
- The march is played in the film The Miracle of Bern when a train of released German prisoners of war arrives at Essen.
- The march reached a wide audience when it was performed by the Vienna Philharmonic at their 2024 New Years Concert under the baton of Christian Thielemann.
