= Wiener Neustadt North station =

Railway station in Wiener Neustadt, Austria

Wiener Neustadt Nord
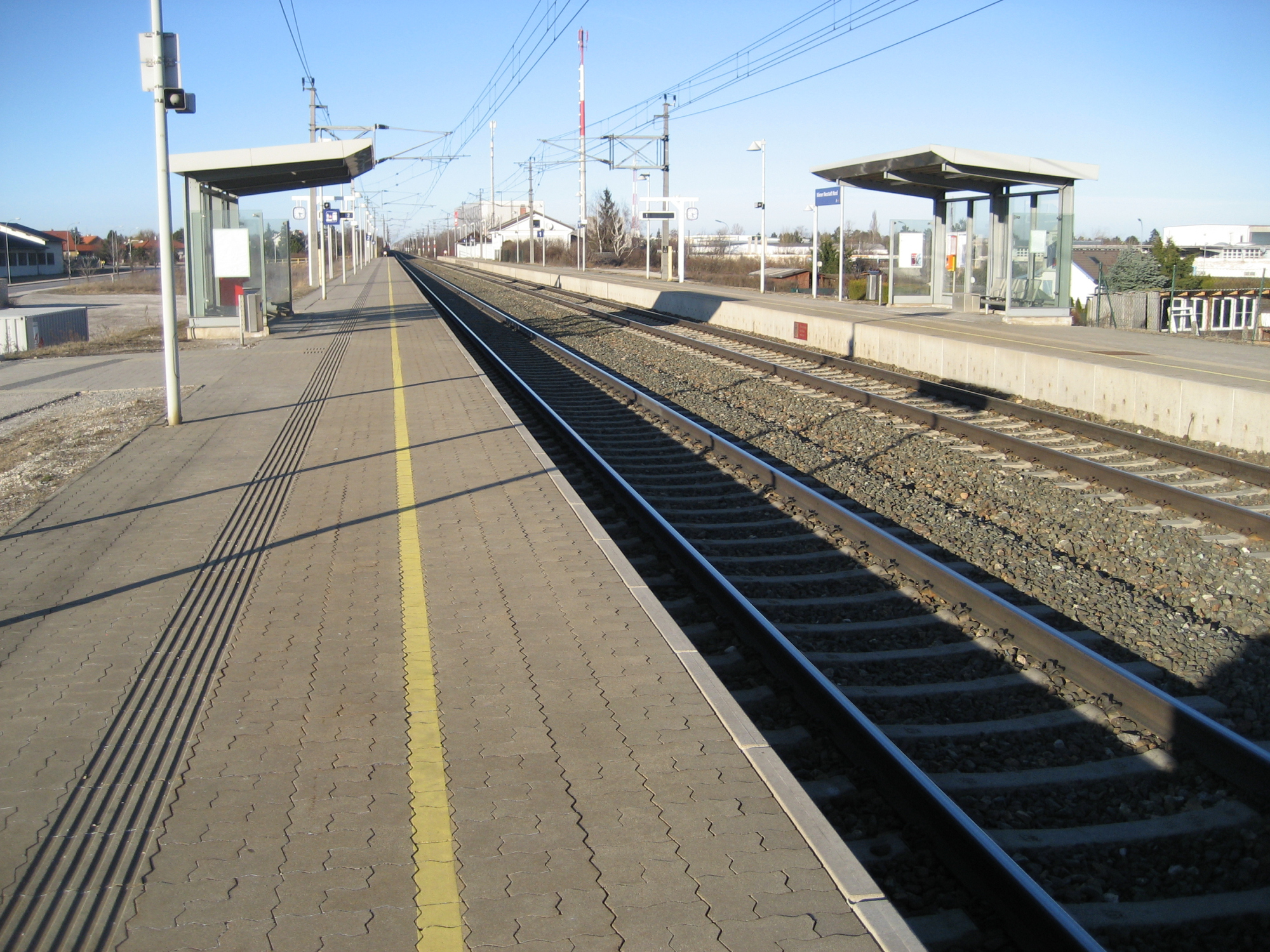

General information
- Location: 2700 Wiener Neustadt; Austria
- Coordinates: 47°50′6″N 16°14′20″E
- Owner: ÖBB
- Operator: ÖBB
- Platforms: 2

History
- Opened: 1841

Services
Preceding station	Vienna S-Bahn	Following station
Wiener Neustadt Hbf Terminus	S3	Theresienfeld towards Hollabrunn
Wiener Neustadt Hbf Terminus	S4	Theresienfeld towards Absdorf-Hippersdorf
Location
- Location within Austria

Wiener Neustadt North (German: Wiener Neustadt Nord) is a railway station serving Wiener Neustadt.

== Notable places nearby ==
- Wiener Neustadt West Airport
