= Schneeberg Railway =

Railway line in Lower Austria

Schneeberg Railway - main section Wiener Neustadt−Puchberg am Schneeberg
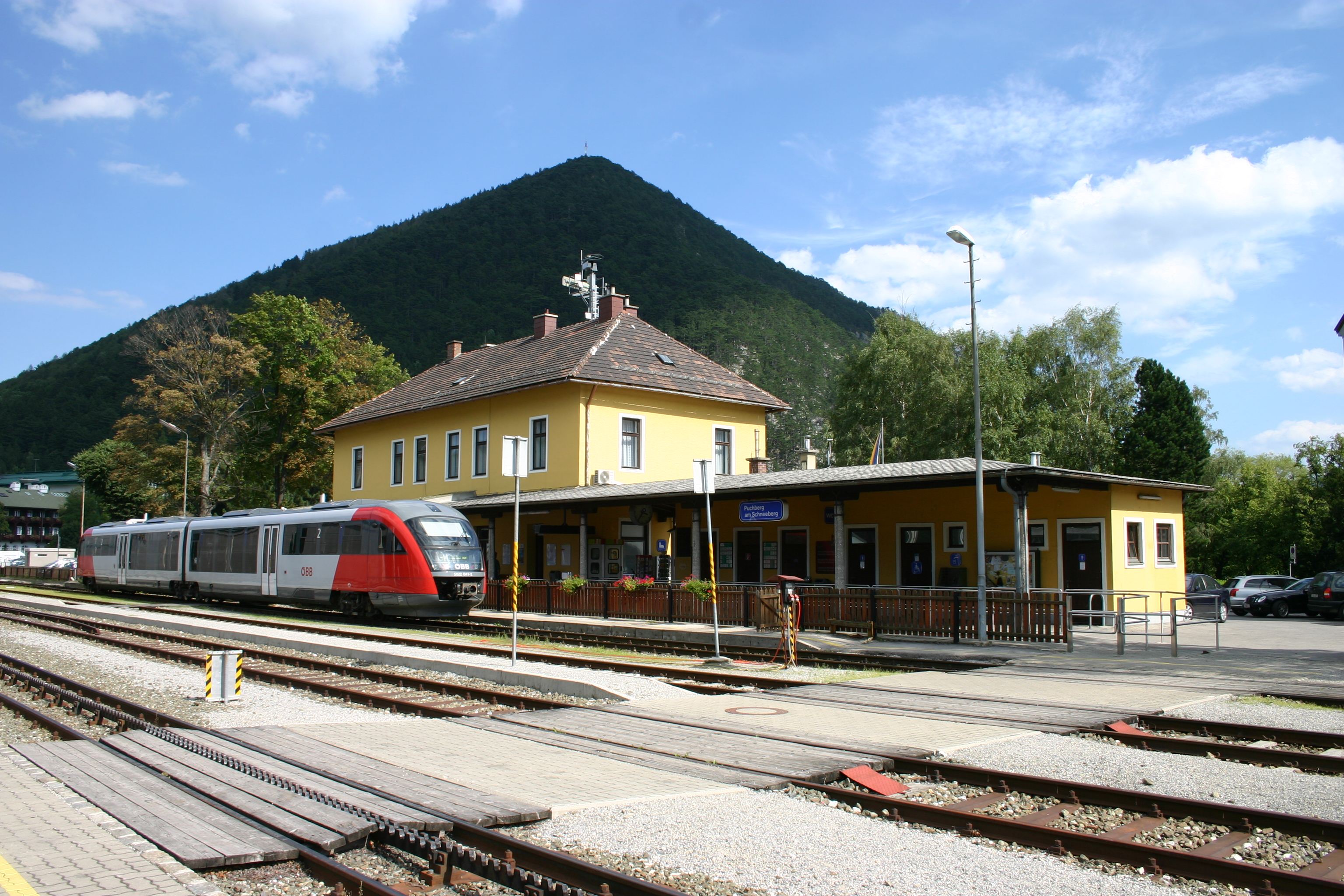
- Puchberg am Schneeberg station Left: the tracks of the cog railway. Right: the standard gauge railway

Overview
- Line number: 163

Technical
- Line length: 28.205 km (17.526 mi)
- Track gauge: 1,435 mm (4 ft 8 1/2 in)
- Minimum radius: 150 m (490 ft)
- Maximum incline: 5.2%

The Schneeberg Railway (German: Schneebergbahn) is a local railway line in Lower Austria running from Wiener Neustadt to the Hochschneeberg mountain.

== Location ==
Between Wiener Neustadt and Puchberg am Schneeberg (the main section) it runs as a standard gauge adhesion railway, and on the Puchberg am Schneeberg–Hochschneeberg extension as a narrow-gauge cog railway . The main section from Wiener Neustadt to Puchberg am Schneeberg had a branch to Wöllersdorf from the outset. The section built later from Sollenau to Feuerwerksanstalt (extension) is now closed and renaturalised.

The line's name - the Schneeberg Railway (Schneebergbahn) - was not only used in the title of the original operating company, the Schneeberg Railway Company Limited, (Actiengesellschaft der Schneebergbahn), but has also been adopted by its latest operator, the Lower Austrian Schneeberg Railway Company (Niederösterreichsche Schneebergbahn GmbH or NÖSBB) founded on 1 January 1997. However, the NÖSBB uses the name Schneebergbahn only for the cog railway section of the route.

== Management ==
Whilst the operation of the standard gauge section of the Schneeberg Railway is handled by the ÖBB, the management of the narrow-gauge rack railway is carried out by the Lower Austrian Schneeberg Railway Company founded in 1997, in which the state of Lower Austria - in the guise of the "Lower Austrian Transport Organization Company" (NÖVOG) - and the ÖBB each have a 50 percent share.

The journey time on the main section from Wiener Neustadt to Puchberg am Schneeberg takes regional trains approximately 45 minutes on the non-electrified single track. On average 15 to 20 Regionalzüge trains run in each direction daily.

The Schneeberg Railway on the extension line from Puchberg am Schneeberg to the Hochschneeberg is a narrow gauge rack railway that has become an important tourist attraction in southern Lower Austria, transporting 120000–130000 registered guests per year.

The journey up the mountain takes 53 minutes using modern coaches. Heritage trips using steam traction and the original carriages still take 1 hour, 17 minutes. The trains to the Hochschneeberg run hourly depending on demand. Adverse weather conditions can cause restrictions or changes to the train service. Services are operated from late April to late October depending on the weather. In addition, in April, special trips to the Hengst Hut are added.

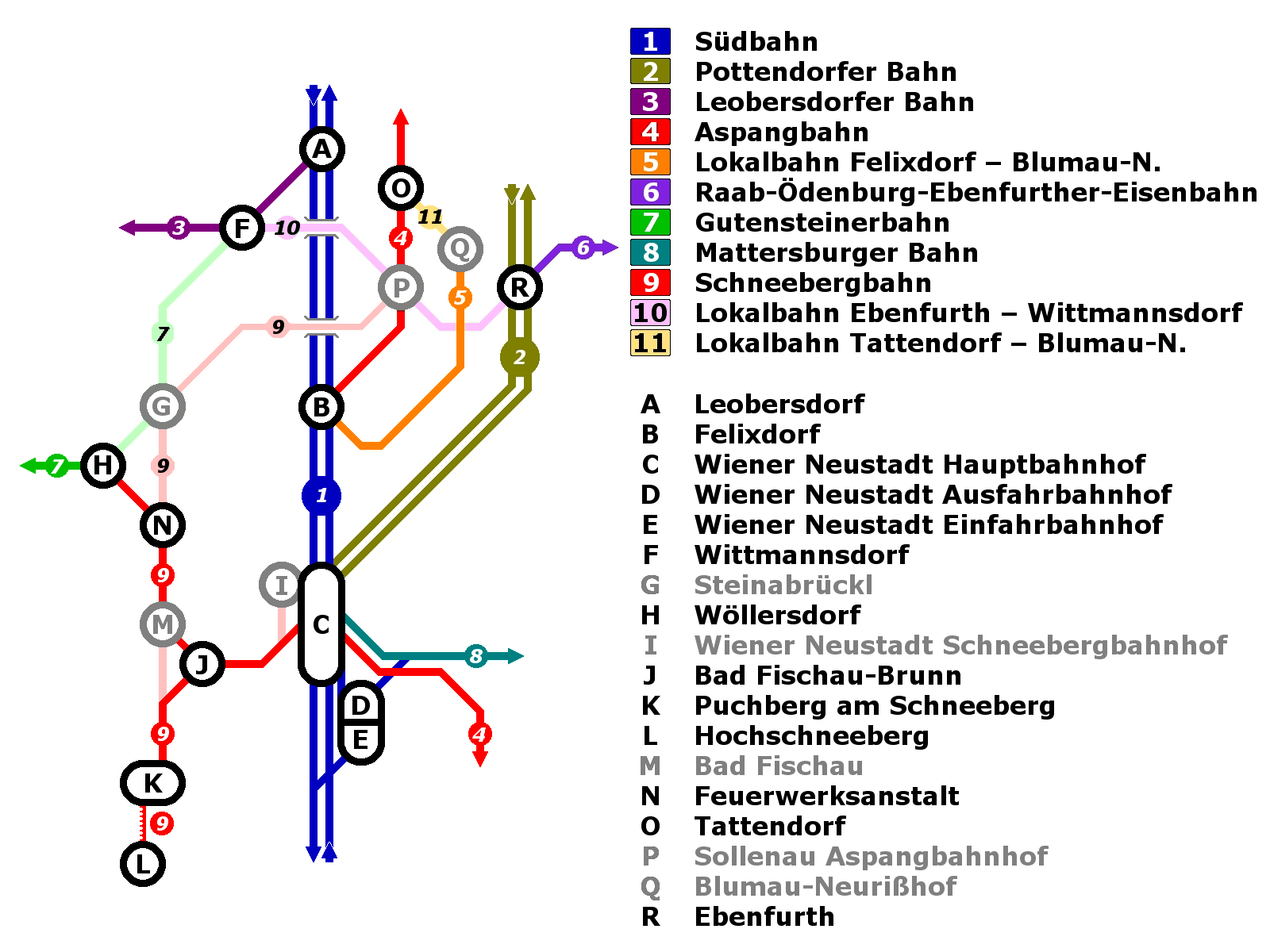
Railway lines in the Wiener Neustadt region

Schneeberg Railway extension Puchberg am Schneeberg–Hochschneeberg cog railway
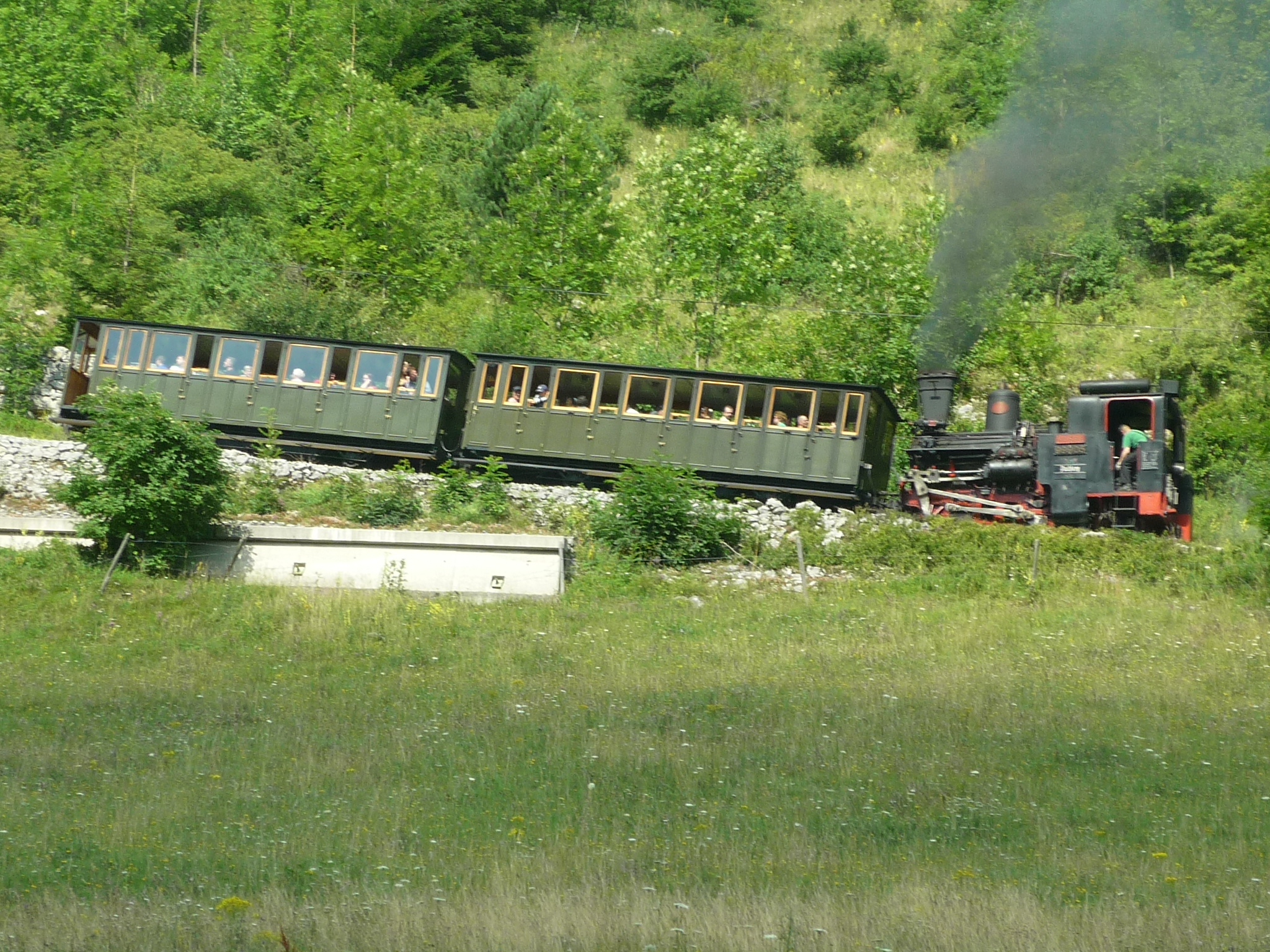
- Cog railway on the Hochschneeberg

Overview
- Line number: 198 01

Service
- Route number: 523

Technical
- Line length: 9.851 km (6.121 mi)
- Rack system: System Abt
- Track gauge: 1,000 mm (3 ft 3 3/8 in)
- Minimum radius: 80 m (260 ft)
- Operating speed: 15 km/h (9.3 mph) max.
- Maximum incline: 19.6%

Schneeberg Railway Bad Fischau-Brunn−Wöllersdorf branch
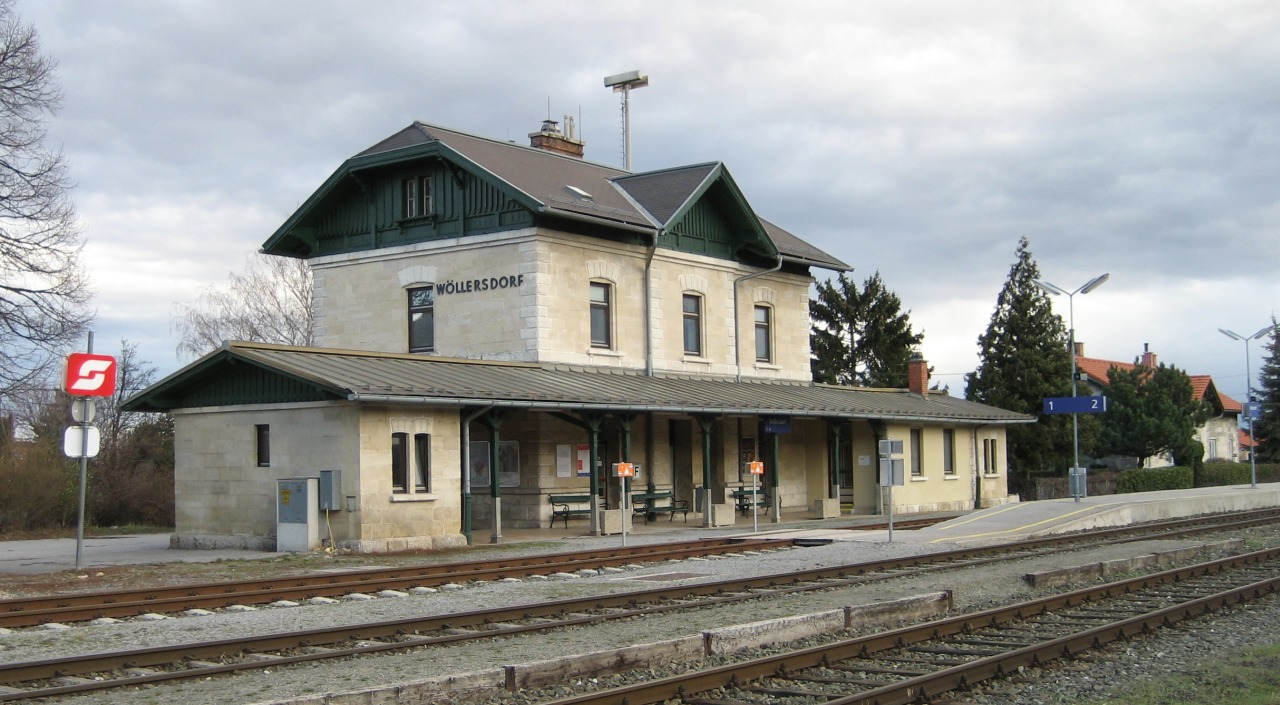
- Wöllersdorf station – junction with the Gutenstein Railway

Overview
- Line number: 166

Technical
- Line length: 5.519 km (3.429 mi)
- Track gauge: 1,435 mm (4 ft 8 1/2 in)
- Minimum radius: 170 m (560 ft)
- Maximum incline: 2.0%

Schneeberg Railway Feuerwerksanstalt–Sollenau link line
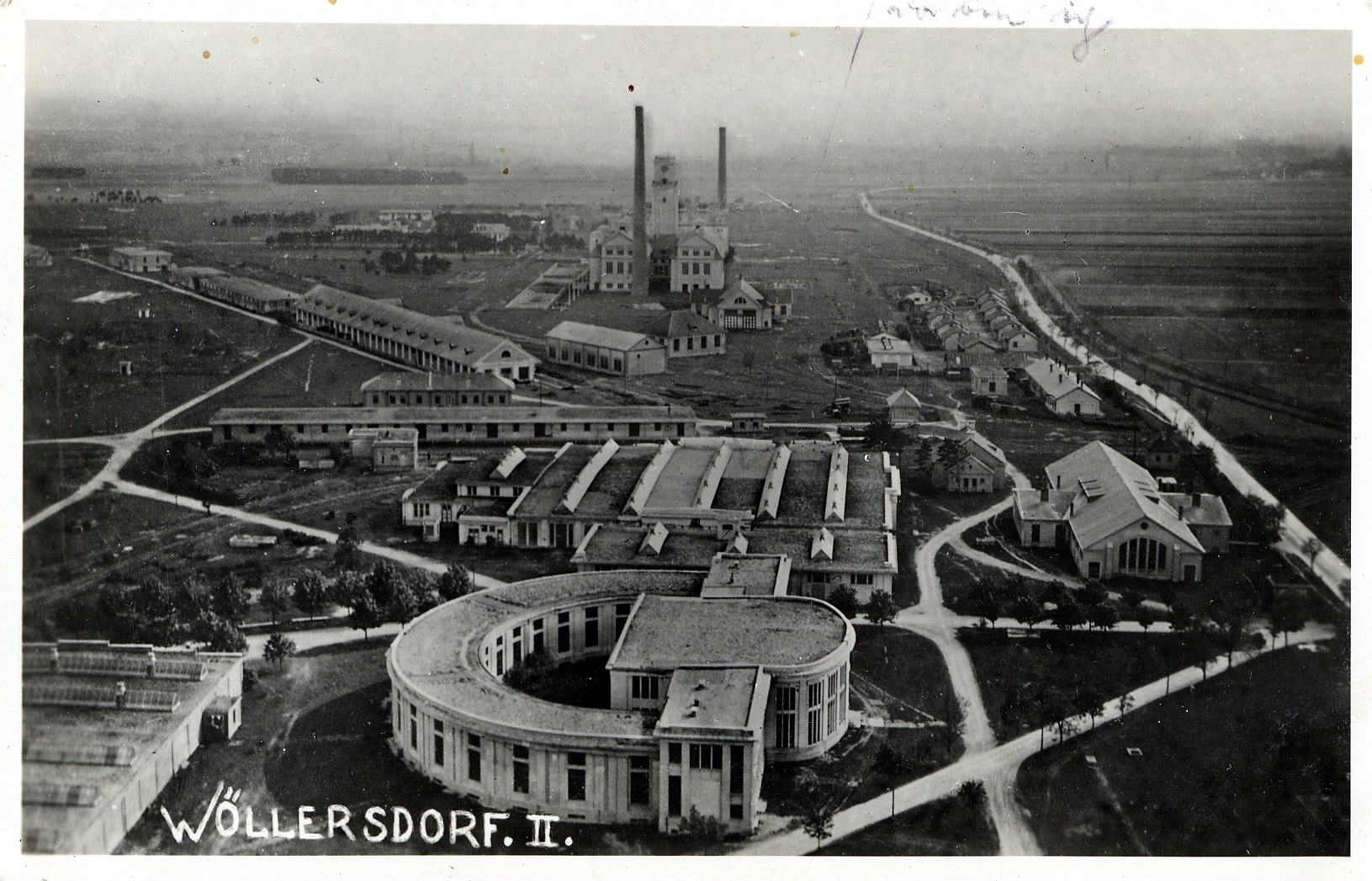
- Feuerwerksanstalt. Right near the road: the trackbed of the Schneeberg line

Technical
- Track gauge: 1,435 mm (4 ft 8 1/2 in)

== Photos ==
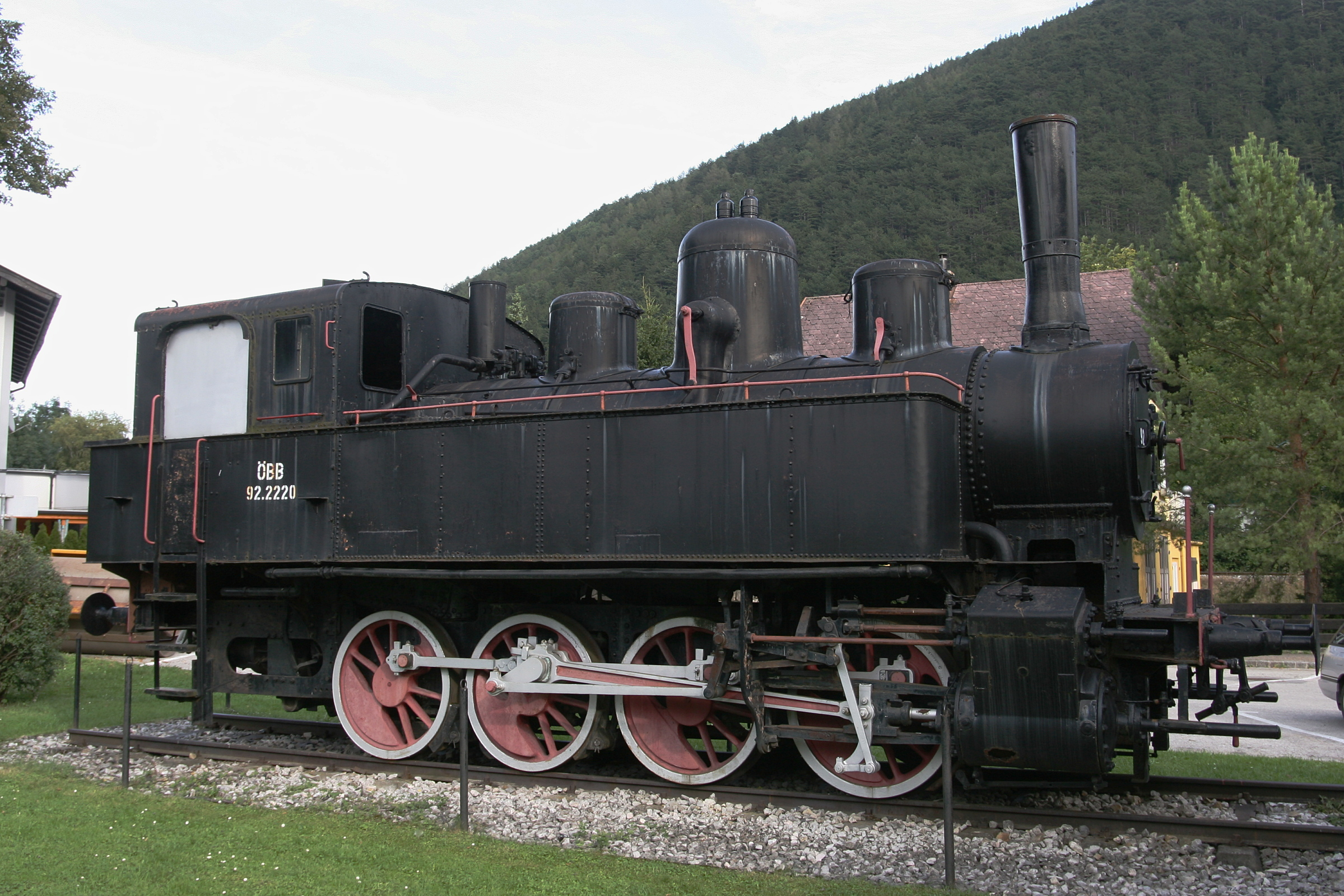
The original locomotive No. 22 Klaus was operated by the ÖBB as 92.2220 until the 1960s

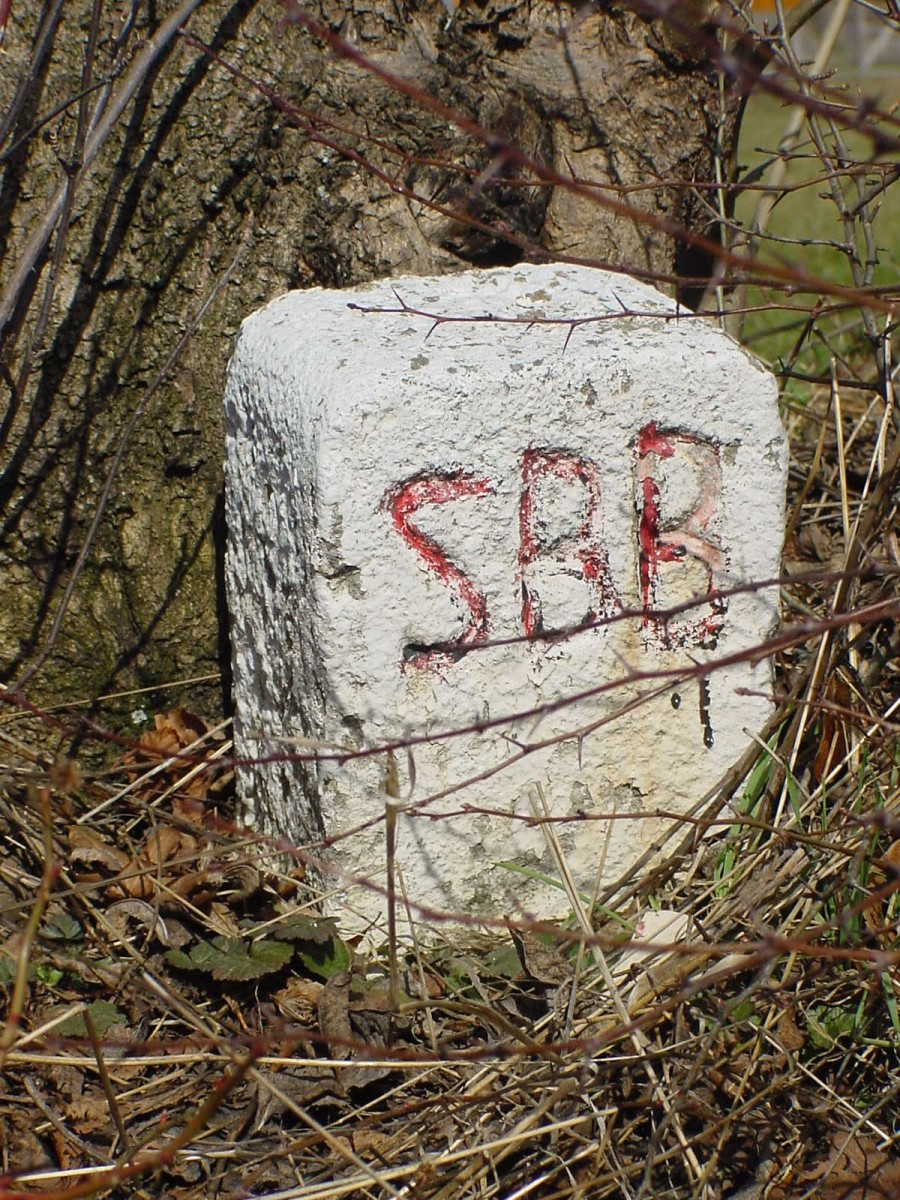
Boundary stone for the Schneeberg Railway

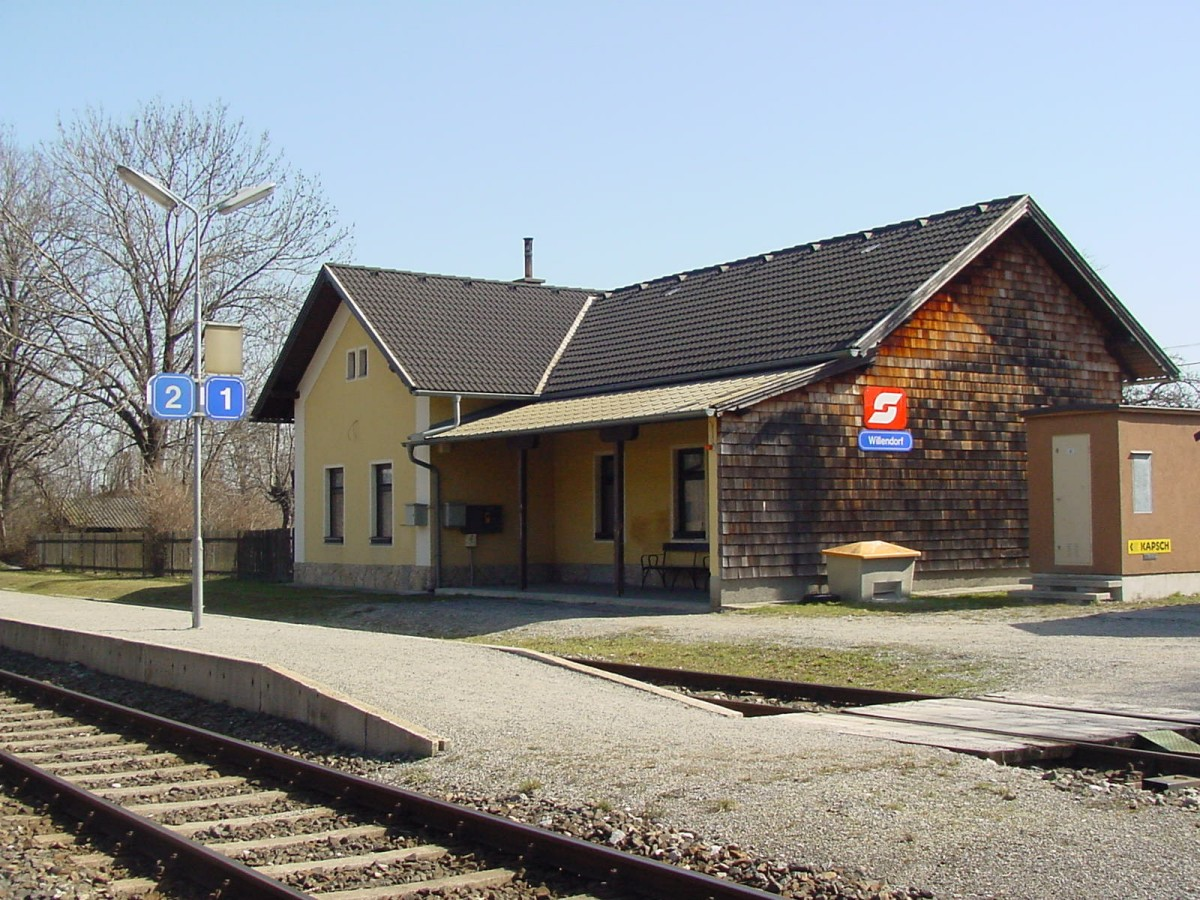
Willendorf station

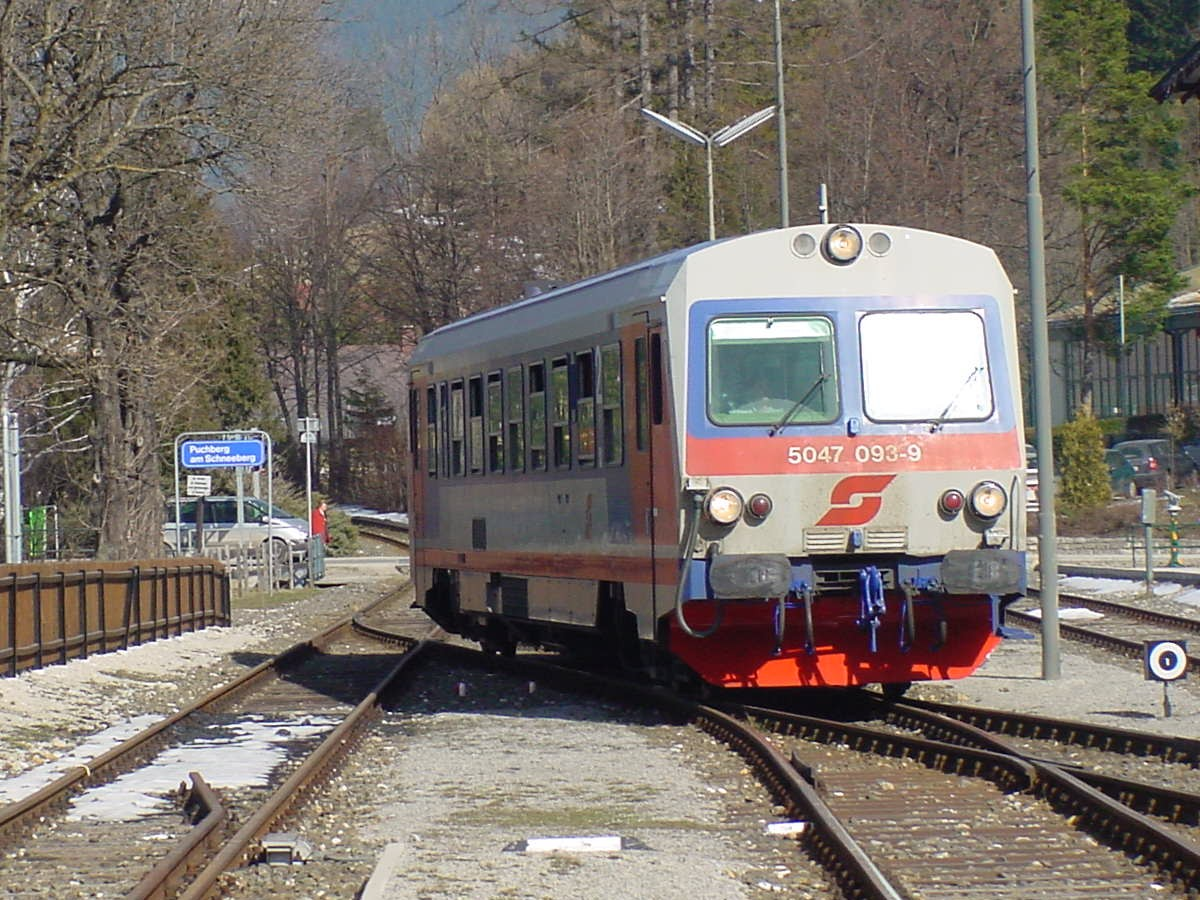
An ÖBB 5047 at Puchberg station

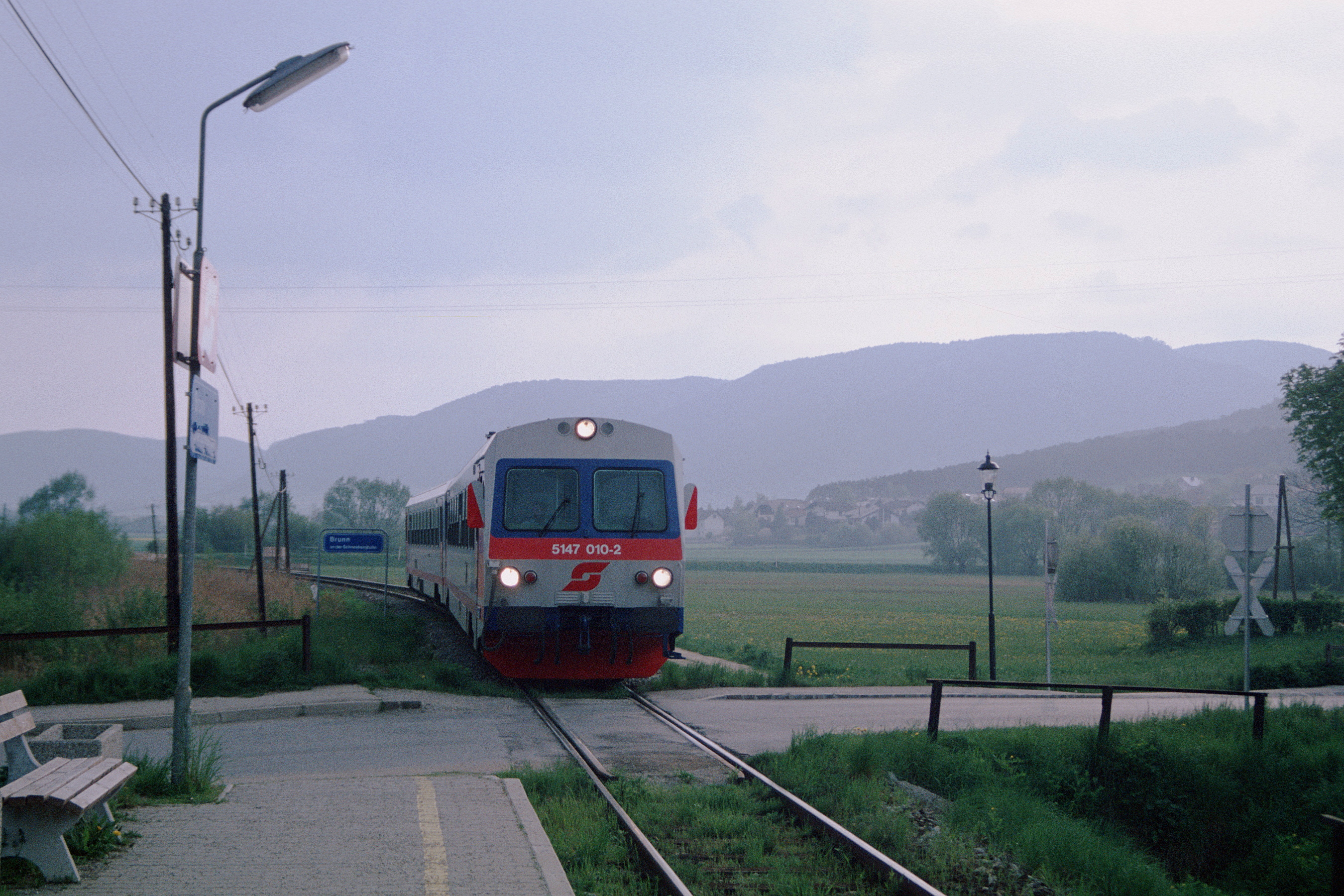
Two-car set of Class 5147 at Brunn Halt

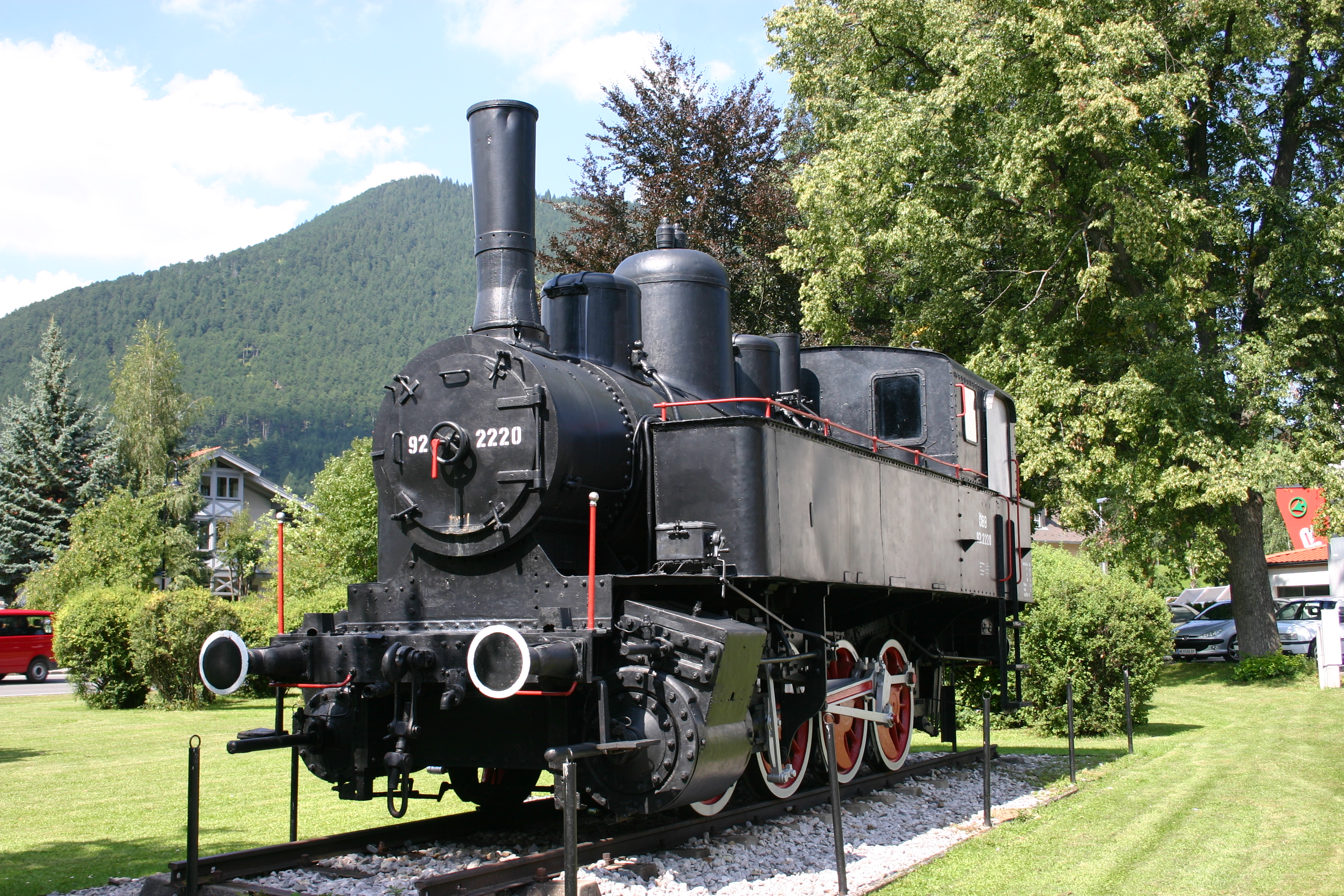
Steam engine monument

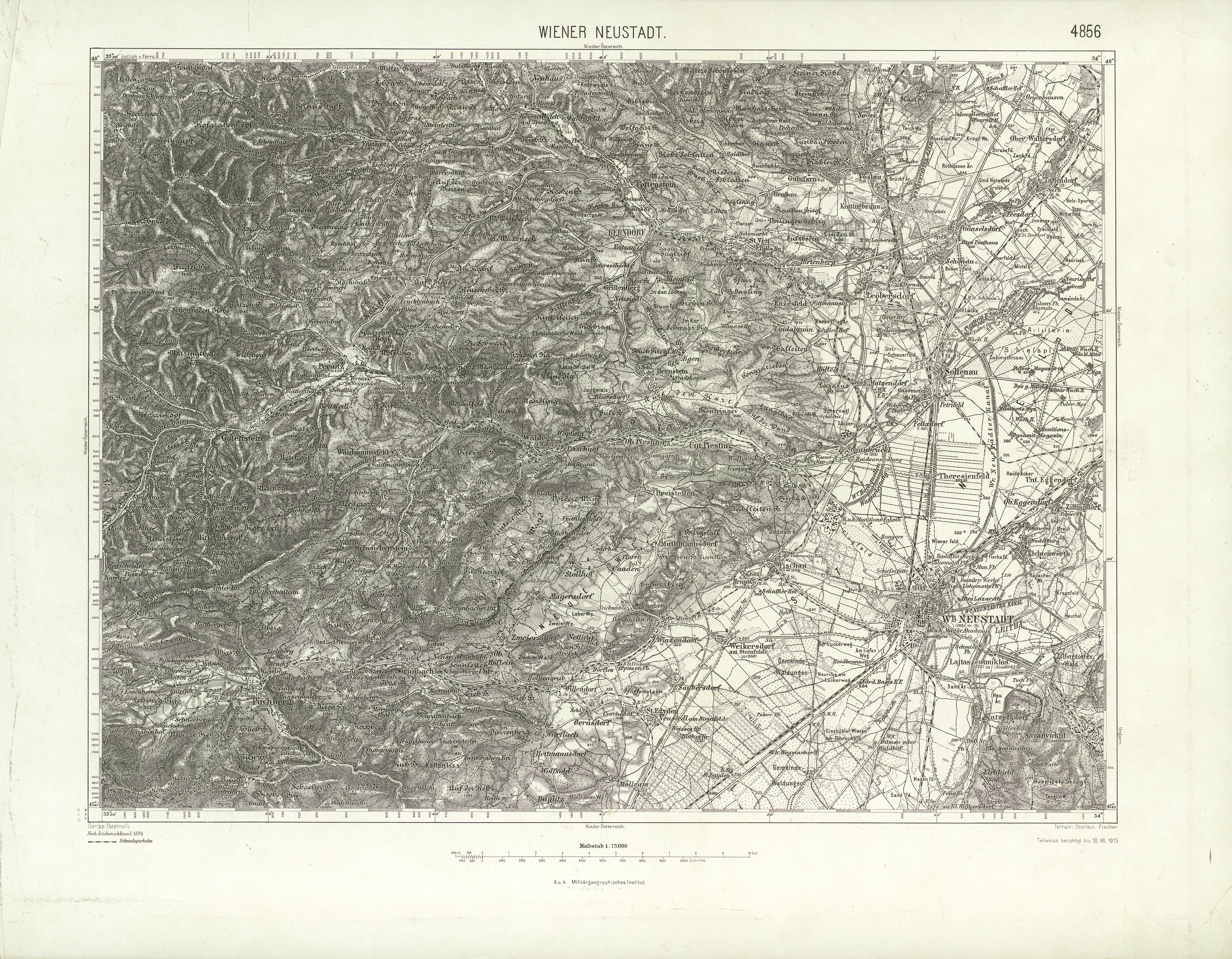
The Schneeberg Railway and its neighbouring lines around 1915 (special map of the state records

== See also ==
- Austrian Federal Railways

== Sources ==
- Alfred Niel: Der Schneeberg und seine Bahn, Verlag Kurt Wedl, Melk 1967
- Informationsbroschüre der Österreichischen Bundesbahnen: Die Schneebergbahn seit 1897, ÖBB 1992
- Slezak: Vom Schiffskanal zur Eisenbahn – Wiener Neustädter Kanal und Aspang Railway (2. Auflage), Verlag Josef Otto Slezak, Wien 1989
- Alfred Luft: 75 Jahre Schneebergbahn 1897–1972, Verlag Verein der Freunde der Murtalbahn, Murau 1972
- Slezak: Schneebergbahn bei Wien (ESA Heft Nr. 18), Verlag Josef Otto Slezak, Wien 1985
