= Wiener Neustadt Hauptbahnhof =

Railway station in Lower Austria

Wiener Neustadt Hbf
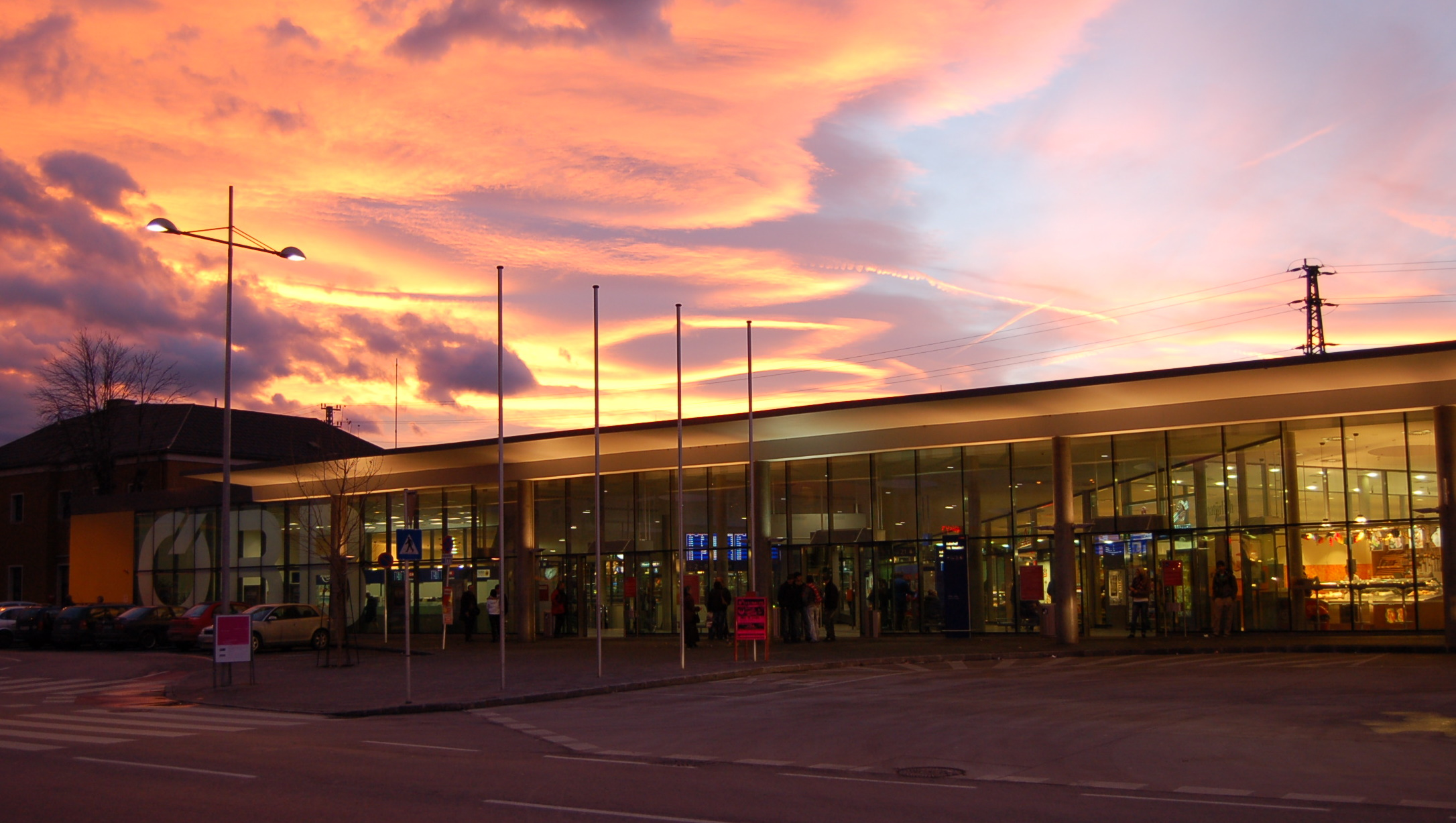
- The station forecourt

General information
- Location: Bahnhofplatz 1; 2700 Wiener Neustadt; Austria
- Coordinates: 47°48′42″N 16°14′03″E
- Owner: ÖBB
- Operator: Austrian Federal Railways (ÖBB)
- Lines: South railway Aspangbahn; Pottendorfer line Schneeberg Railway; Gutensteinerbahn; Mattersburger Bahn; S-Bahn Stammstrecke
- Platforms: 10
- Connections: S-Bahn: Vienna S-Bahn

History
- Opened: 20 June 1841

Services
Preceding station	ÖBB	Following station
Bruck an der Mur towards Venezia Santa Lucia	Railjet	Wien Meidling towards Wien Hbf
Semmering towards Graz Hbf	Railjet	Wien Meidling towards Berlin-Charlottenburg
Semmering towards Graz Hbf	Railjet	Wien Meidling towards Praha hl.n.
Leoben towards Villach Hbf	Railjet	Wien Meidling towards Wien Hbf
Semmering towards Graz Hbf	Railjet	Wien Meidling towards Vienna Airport
Mürzzuschlag towards Graz Hbf	EuroCity	Wien Meidling towards Przemyśl Główny
Mürzzuschlag towards Trieste Centrale	EuroCity	Wien Meidling towards Wien Hbf
Leoben towards Lienz	InterCity	Wien Meidling towards Wien Hbf
Leoben towards Villach Hbf	InterCity	Wien Meidling towards Wien Hbf
Bruck an der Mur towards Roma Termini or La Spezia Centrale	Nightjet	Wien Meidling towards Wien Hbf
Bruck an der Mur towards Graz Hbf	Nightjet	Wien Meidling towards Berlin-Charlottenburg or Warszawa Wschodnia
Preceding station	Vienna S-Bahn	Following station
Terminus	S3	Wiener Neustadt North towards Hollabrunn
Terminus	S4	Wiener Neustadt North towards Absdorf-Hippersdorf
Terminus	S60	Wiener Neustadt Civitas Nova towards Bruck an der Leitha
Location
- Location within Austria

Wiener Neustadt Hauptbahnhof is a railway station in Wiener Neustadt, in the federal state of Lower Austria, south of Vienna. With over 700 trains and 25,000 passengers each day, the station is the busiest in Lower Austria.

An important stop on both the South railway (German: Südbahn) and the Aspangbahn, the station is also a junction for the branch lines to Gutenstein, Payerbach and Mattersburg, the Pottendorfer line to Pottendorf-Landegg, and the Vienna S-Bahn Stammstrecke (main line) to Floridsdorf. All trains on the Südbahn stop here, as do all trains on the branch lines originating here.

The station, which was completely reconstructed between 1997 and 2003, is also the starting point for most city bus lines in Wiener Neustadt. Directly connected to the station building is a branch of the Österreichische Post.

== History ==
With the opening of the railway line between Vienna and Wiener Neustadt on 20 June 1841, the Wiener Neustadt station also came into operation. Ever since then, the station has been an important transportation hub in Lower Austria.

By the end of the 20th century, the old two-storey station building (the second floor was a restaurant) was largely run down and was widely seen as a blot on the city landscape. It was also inconveniently laid out and equipped. For example, to get to the platforms, it was necessary to leave the building to go to the underpass, and there were no escalators or elevators at all.

== Present day station ==
Between 1997 and 2003, the station was successfully reconstructed, at a cost of 55.3 million euros.

During the reconstruction work, the station building itself was completely demolished and rebuilt, and the platforms refurbished. The underpass was modified so that it could be reached directly from the station concourse. Additionally, the underpass was made accessible from the other side of the lines and was equipped with escalators and elevators. At the other end of the platforms, an overpass was built from scratch.

As part of the renovations, the station forecourt and bus station were also completely redesigned and the underpass in the Kollonitsch alley was modified. Since the modifications were completed, coaches have had access to the underpass and cyclists and pedestrians have been able to use the railway bridge to cross the road.

== Concourse ==
In the concourse are, amongst other things, an Okay Shop, tobacconist, the ÖBB ticket office and waiting rooms. There are also ticket machines. Distribution boxes for the free newspaper Heute are in the pedestrian underpass, and those for the free newspaper Austria are located at the bus stops for the city buses.

== Train services ==
The station is served by the following services:

- RailJet services Graz - Vienna - Breclav - Brno - Pardubice - Prague
- RailJet services Villach - Klagenfurt - Vienna
- EuroCity services Zagreb - Maribor - Graz - Vienna
- EuroNight services Rome - Florence - Bologna - Venice - Villach - Klagenfurt - Vienna

== Platforms ==
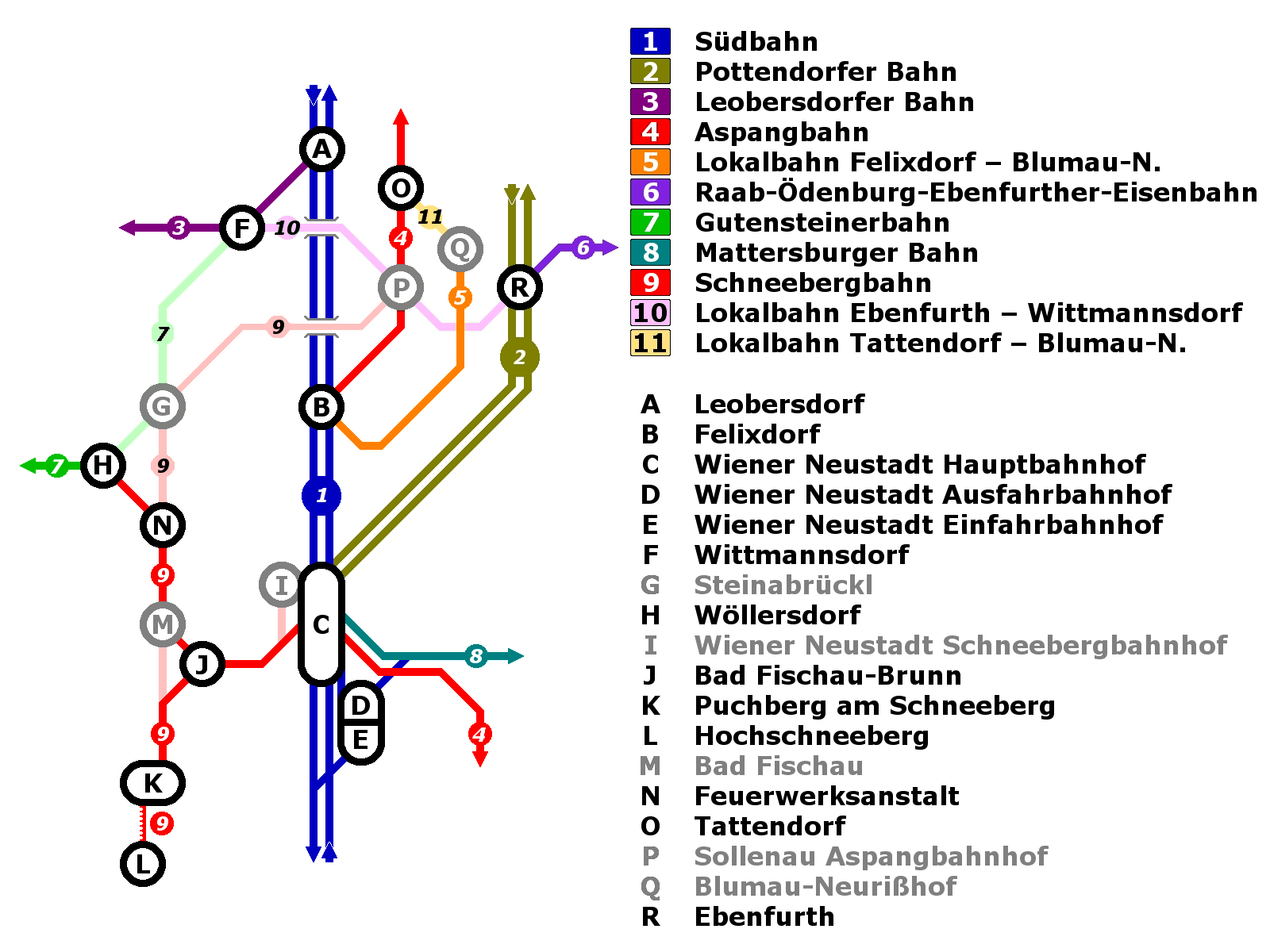
Railway lines in the Wiener Neustadt area.

The station has ten platforms (1-9, 21).

Platforms 1b and 21 are used by the Mattersburger Railway (direct trains to Sopron, Deutschkreutz and Neckenmarkt-Horitschon), and Platform 1a by the Pottendorfer line, which is now integrated into the S-Bahn system as lines S5 and S6 (trains to Absdorf-Hippersdorf and Hollabrunn via Wien Mitte, Eisenstadt Schule]).

Platform 2b serves the outer Aspangbahn (to Aspang, Hartberg, Friedberg, Fehring).

Platforms 2, 3, 4 and 5 are used by IC and EC trains of the Südbahn (from Wien Meidling (as at 2010) to Graz, Klagenfurt, Marburg, Lienz in Osttirol,...) and the Regional Express trains (REX) / Regional trains (R) of the Südbahn (Taurus locomotive with 5 Wiesel double-deck cars from Znojmo or Břeclav via Wien Mitte to Payerbach-Reichenau).

Platform 6a is used by other branch line trains (e.g.: inner Aspangbahn to Maria Lanzendorf, Triestingtalbahn to Weissbach-Neuhaus via Leobersdorf. Platform 7a serves the Gutensteinerbahn, and Platform 8a the Schneeberg Railway.

Platforms 6b, 7b, 8b and 9 are allocated to other trains operating on the various branch lines. The S-Bahn trains of the Südbahn (S1, S2, S9) use Platforms 1a, 6a and 9a.

Since completion of the reconstruction work in 2003, all platforms have been barrier-free. Passengers can now pass easily from the concourse directly through a subway to the platforms, where, amongst other things, the high-traffic platforms 3 and 4 of the Südbahn are equipped with escalators. At the other end of the platforms is an overpass, which facilitates movement between the platforms, and gives access to the parking deck. Since 2003, it has also been possible, via the subway, to gain access to the platforms from the opposite side of the station (the Zehnerviertel).

== See also ==
- Rail transport in Austria
