= Rollett =

Notable people with the surname of Rollett include:

- Alexander Rollett (1834–1903), Austrian physiologist and histologist.
- Anthony Rollett, Fellow of the Institute of Physics.
- Georg Anton Rollett (1778–1842), Austrian naturalist and physician.
- Hilda Rollett (1873–1970), New Zealand teacher, journalist and writer.
