= Reicheia (beetle) =

Scientific classification
- Kingdom: Animalia
- Phylum: Arthropoda
- Class: Insecta
- Order: Coleoptera
- Suborder: Adephaga
- Family: Carabidae
- Subfamily: Scaritinae
- Genus: Reicheia; Saulcy, 1862

Genus of beetles

Reicheia is a genus of beetles in the family Carabidae, containing the following species:

- Reicheia ambondrombe (Bulirsch, Janák & Moravec, 2005)
- Reicheia andohahelana (Basilewsky, 1976)
- Reicheia antsifotrae (Basilewsky, 1971)
- Reicheia baborica Bruneau De Miré, 1955
- Reicheia balkenohli (Bulirsch & Magrini, 2007)
- Reicheia bergeri (Basilewsky, 1976)
- Reicheia bonsae (Basilewsky, 1973)
- Reicheia brieni Basilewsky, 1951
- Reicheia brisouti Bedel, 1895
- Reicheia calais (V. V. Grebennikov, Bulirsch & Magrini, 2017)
- Reicheia caledonica (Basilewsky, 1980)
- Reicheia camerounensis V. V. Grebennikov, Bulirsch & Magrini, 2009
- Reicheia consocia (Basilewsky, 1980)
- Reicheia corinna Holdhaus, 1924
- Reicheia debeckeri (Basilewsky, 1976)
- Reicheia debruynei Basilewsky, 1951
- Reicheia demirei V. V. Grebennikov, Bulirsch & Magrini, 2009
- Reicheia descarpentriesi (Basilewsky, 1972)
- Reicheia deuvei V. V. Grebennikov, Bulirsch & Magrini, 2009
- Reicheia endroedyi (Bulirsch & Magrini, 2006)
- Reicheia exigua (Jeannel, 1957)
- Reicheia franzi (Basilewsky, 1973)
- Reicheia gracilis (Jeannel, 1958)
- Reicheia grandis (Basilewsky, 1971)
- Reicheia grebennikovi (Bulirsch & Magrini, 2007)
- Reicheia hintelmanni V. V. Grebennikov, Bulirsch & Magrini, 2009
- Reicheia hlavaci (Bulirsch & Magrini, 2006)
- Reicheia hogsbackensis (Bulirsch & Magrini, 2016)
- Reicheia hottentota (Bulirsch & Magrini, 2018)
- Reicheia humicola (Basilewsky, 1980)
- Reicheia irsac Basilewsky, 1953
- Reicheia italica Holdhaus, 1924
- Reicheia janaki (Bulirsch & Magrini, 2016)
- Reicheia jarmilae (Bulirsch & Magrini, 2006)
- Reicheia jeanneli Basilewsky, 1951
- Reicheia kaboboana (Basilewsky, 1960)
- Reicheia kabyliana Bruneau De Miré, 1955
- Reicheia kahuziana Basilewsky, 1951
- Reicheia leleupi Basilewsky, 1951
- Reicheia leleupiana (Basilewsky, 1980)
- Reicheia lindrothi (Basilewsky, 1980)
- Reicheia lucifuga Saulcy, 1862
- Reicheia marginodentata Basilewsky, 1951
- Reicheia moritai Balkenohl, 2005
- Reicheia numida Jeannel, 1957
- Reicheia palustris Saulcy, 1870
- Reicheia pauliani (Jeannel, 1958)
- Reicheia peyrierasi (Basilewsky, 1972)
- Reicheia promontorii Péringuey, 1896
- Reicheia sciakyi (Bulirsch & Magrini, 2007)
- Reicheia subgrandis (Basilewsky, 1976)
- Reicheia subterranea Putzeys, 1866
- Reicheia transita (Basilewsky, 1976)
- Reicheia tsitsikamae (Basilewsky, 1980)
- Reicheia uluguruana (Basilewsky, 1962)
- Reicheia valida (Jeannel, 1957)
- Reicheia vandenberghei Basilewsky, 1951
- Reicheia viettei (Basilewsky, 1976)
- Reicheia vohidray (Bulirsch, Janák & Moravec, 2005)
- Reicheia zetes (V. V. Grebennikov, Bulirsch & Magrini, 2017)
