= Klotz =

Klotz may refer to:

- Klotz (surname) (including a list of people with the name)
- Klotz, a fictional place in Überwald in Discworld, a fantasy book series
- 10222 Klotz, an asteroid; see List of asteroids/10001–11000
- Klotz (violin makers), Bavarian family of violin makers since the mid-17th century
- Klotz Digital, a German multinational manufacturer of commercial audio systems

== See also ==
- Cloots
- Kloc (disambiguation)
