= KLOZ (disambiguation) =

KLOZ is a radio station (92.7 FM) licensed to Eldon, Missouri, United States.

KLOZ may also refer to:

- London-Corbin Airport's ICAO code

== People with the surname ==
- František Kloz, Czech football player

== See also ==
Klotz (surname)
