= Eduard Melkus =

Austrian violinist and violist

Eduard Melkus (born 1 September 1928 in Baden bei Wien) is an Austrian violinist and violist.

Following the Second World War, Melkus dedicated himself to the exploration of historically informed performance. He was a member of the 1949 Vienna viola da gamba quartet, a select group of musicians that included Alice and Nikolaus Harnoncourt and the harpsichordist Gustav Leonhardt. In the years that followed, he was also noted as a champion of new music.

From 1958, Melkus was a professor of violin, baroque violin, viola, and historical performance practice at the Vienna Academy of Music. From September 1972 to January 1975, he flew in to teach violin at the University of Georgia in Athens, Georgia, USA. In 1982 he became head of the Institute for Viennese Sound Style.

He performed and recorded more than 200 works from the mid 17th through the early 19th centuries with his ensemble Capella Academica Wien, or the French harpsichordist Huguette Dreyfus. In his time, he tapped a worldwide audience before being replaced as a violin soloist by a new wave in the revival of historically informed baroque period performance--a movement called "early music."

Melkus' style included elements that came to be eschewed by the later "early music" orthodoxy: the use of the wire E-string rather than gut, the A=440 pitch standard adopted in 1896 (as opposed to lower "baroque" pitch), a chin-rest--though used by many "early music" violinists anyway (in addition to or alternating with 20th-century orthopedic devices like hidden shoulder rests), and unsparing vibrato. He took different path from his better-know Viennese colleagues Nikolaus and Alice Harnoncourt, with whom he began in the studio of keyboardist Isolde Ahlgrimm with her husband Erich Fiala. He was also at odds with the later principals of the "early music" movement in Holland, England, and the US.

However, history and reflection have demonstrated that Melkus was better-informed. The wire E-string was the result of two centuries' dissatisfaction with the unstable gut E, and failed experiments with other materials were ubiquitous throughout those centuries. In that way, the invention of higher carbon-content steel leading to a strong enough metal E-string was a relief for violinists, virtually all of whom discarded the frustrating gut E-string in 1917 (see Frederick H. Martens, Violin Mastery, 1919, rpt. 2006). Pitch was always variable from town to town and venue to venue, not mention country to country. That the "early music" movement selected pitches an equal-tempered semitone below standard pitch for Baroque playing (A=415) and a quarter-tone below the A=440 standard for Classical playing (A=430) is a modern, artificial construct (and equal temperament was in scant use during the 17th and 18th centuries). Melkus simply retained the international standard--which, ironically, has been noted as the pitch of Cremona during the late 17th and early 18th centuries, where the greatest violins were made. The frequent or even near-continuous use of vibrato, though narrower than the type used by modern sting players, is well-documented either to be praised (Geminiani, The Art of Playing on the Violin, 1751) or chided (Leopold Mozart, Violinschule, 1756). It was a matter of personal preference and cyclical taste: indeed, in Thomas Mace's 1676 Musick's Monument, we read the extraordinary sentiment that while it was not too popular at the time of writing, it had been used constantly by "the old ones." Given the amount of ink lavished on the subject during the period, it was clearly a key topic. Again, Melkus has been proved more historically accurate than the "early music" orthodoxy. Most importantly, Melkus was authentic as a musical interpreter. A virtuoso violinist and scholar rather than a follower dependent of third-hand information, he invariably improvised elaborate ornamentation and cadenzas, as the composers expected. Later "early music" string players are consistently reluctant to improvise, or are insufficiently proficient or convincing when they have tried.

His best-known recordings include Deutsche Grammophon LPs of the Corelli Violin Sonatas, Opus 5 with rare extant 18th-century embellishments, prepared in conjunction with musicologist Marc Pincherle, the Biber Rosary Sonatas—for which he won the Deutscher Schallplattenpreis in 1967, Tartini/Nardini Violin Concerti, the LP Hoheschule der Violine which includes the first period-instrument performances of the Tomasso Vitali Chaconne and Tartini Devil's Trill Sonata, and the Violin Sonatas, Opus 1 of G.F. Handel, the Bach Violin Concerti, Couperin Apotheoses/Leclair Tombeau sonata, and an important LP entitled Polish and Hanakian Folk Music in the Work of G.P. Telemann. For all these recordings, Melkus played an unaltered violin by Aegidius Kloz, made in Mittenwald during the latter half of the eighteenth century, while the rest of his ensemble, the Cappella Academica Wien, played on far more expensive Italian instruments borrowed from the Vienna Akademie fur Musik and restored to resemble their original conditions. Melkus' later recordings of such works as Bach's Sonatas for Violin and Harpsichord were made on a retrofitted violin bearing the label of Nicolo Amati of Cremona, 1679; Amati ceased making instruments in 1670, dying in 1684, aged 87, so the instrument is the work of a maker whom he supervised in his shop. Though perhaps richer-sounding, Melkus seemed more daring and comfortable on the Kloz. Moreover, as Melkus always pointed out in liner notes, the Kloz is rare in surviving with its original neck, bass-bar, and fingerboard, rather than requiring somewhat speculative retrofitting—which cannot be said for the Amati; no Amatis survive in original state for restorer consultation. Melkus owns three other instruments attributed to that unequaled maker, comprising a complete string quartet.

Melkus has been the subject of two articles by Tully Potter, one in The Gramophone in January 2019 and the other in The Strad in July 2019.

== Bibliography ==
- 15 Jahre Institut für Wiener Klangstil (1980-1995), Institut für Wiener Klangstil 1996, ISBN 3-900914-01-X
- Die Violine. Eine Einführung in die Geschichte der Violine und des Violinspiels, Schott, Mainz 2000, ISBN 3-7957-2359-0

Books written

1. Der Bachbogen
2. Die Violine als Objekt der Stilkunde
3. Bogensetzung und Stricharten in der Musik Mozarts
4. Bogensetzung und Stricharten im Werke Beethovens
