= Alexander Rollett =

Austrian physiologist and histologist (1834–1903)

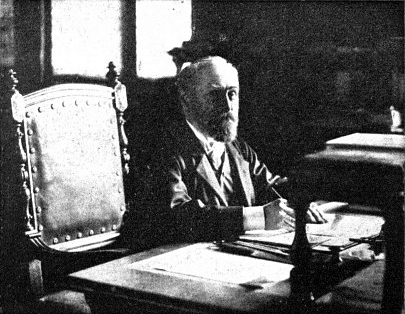
Alexander Rollett in his study

Alexander Rollett (14 July 1834 – 1 October 1903) was an Austrian physiologist and histologist born in Baden bei Wien, Niederösterreich.

He studied with Ernst Wilhelm von Brücke (1819–1892) in Vienna, and in 1863 became a professor of physiology and histology at the University in Graz. He was a prime factor in making Graz an international center for physiological training and education. Between 1872 and 1903 he was rector of the university four times, and from 1893 was president of the Styrian Medical Association.

He was a member of the Austrian Academy of Sciences (1864), a corresponding member of the Societas Medicorum Svecana (1882) and the Royal Bavarian Academy of Sciences (1892).

He was the author of numerous scientific papers on gastric glands, connective tissue, blood cells, tendons, nerves, etc. He also penned treatises on the construction and physiology of striated muscle fibers, and works involving the eye and eyesight that discussed topics such as binocular vision, color in Newton's rings and subjective color. His name is associated with "Rollett's stroma", being defined as an insoluble, spongy network forming the framework of a red blood cell. Embedded within the interstices of Rollett's stroma is hemoglobin.

Rollett was politically active, serving as a member of the Styrian Parliament and as a city council member in Graz. He was the grandson of naturalist Georg Anton Rollett (1778–1842), a nephew of poet Hermann Rollett (1819–1904), and the father of author Edwin Rollett (1889–1964) and physician Octavia Aigner-Rollett (1877–1959).
