= Matthias Klotz =

German luthier (1653–1743)

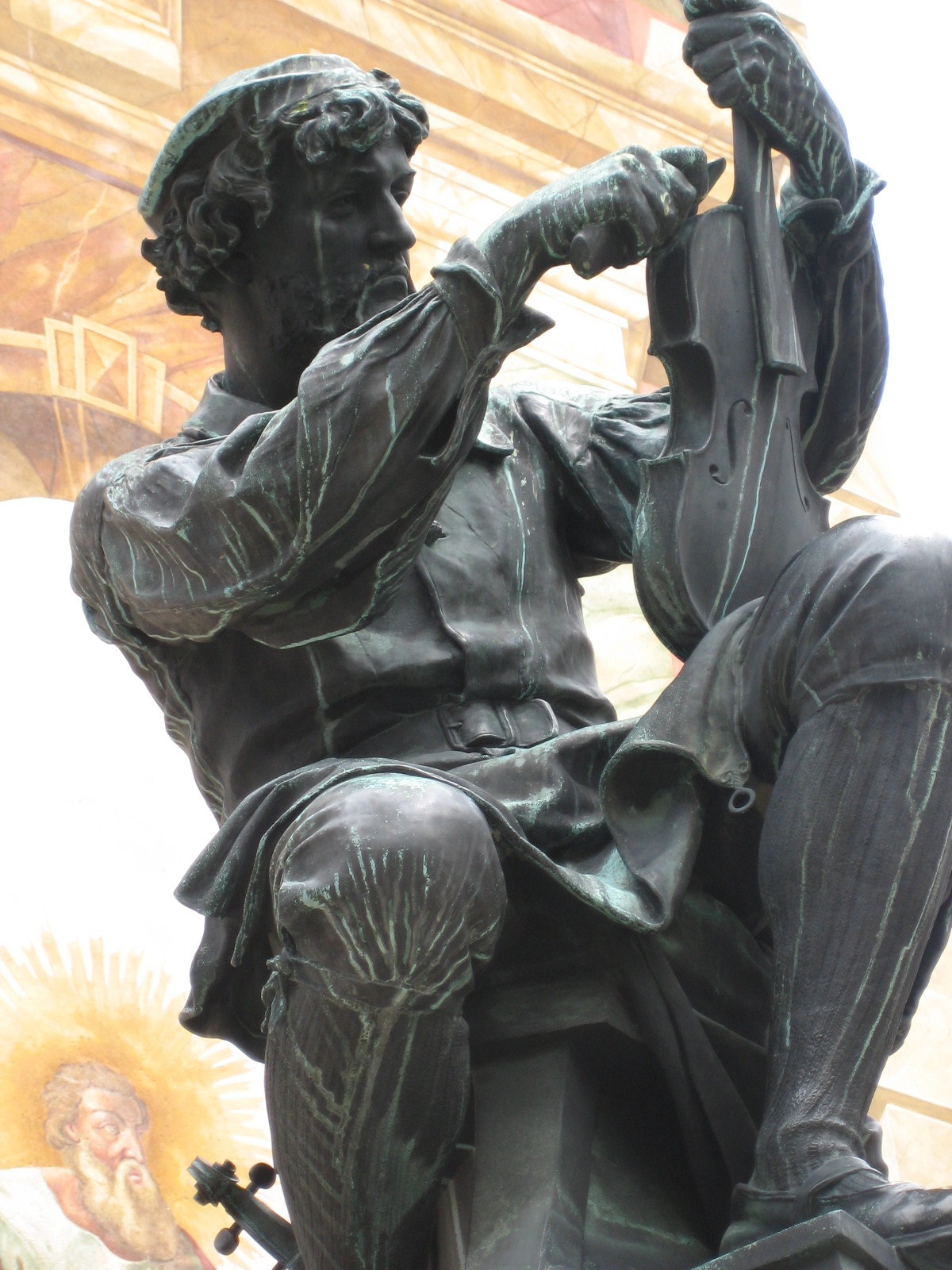
- Klotz memorial in Mittenwald
- Born: Mittenwald, Duchy of Bavaria, Holy Roman Empire
- Baptised: 11 June 1653
- Died: 16 August 1743 (aged 90); Mittenwald
- Occupation: Luthier
- Family: Klotz

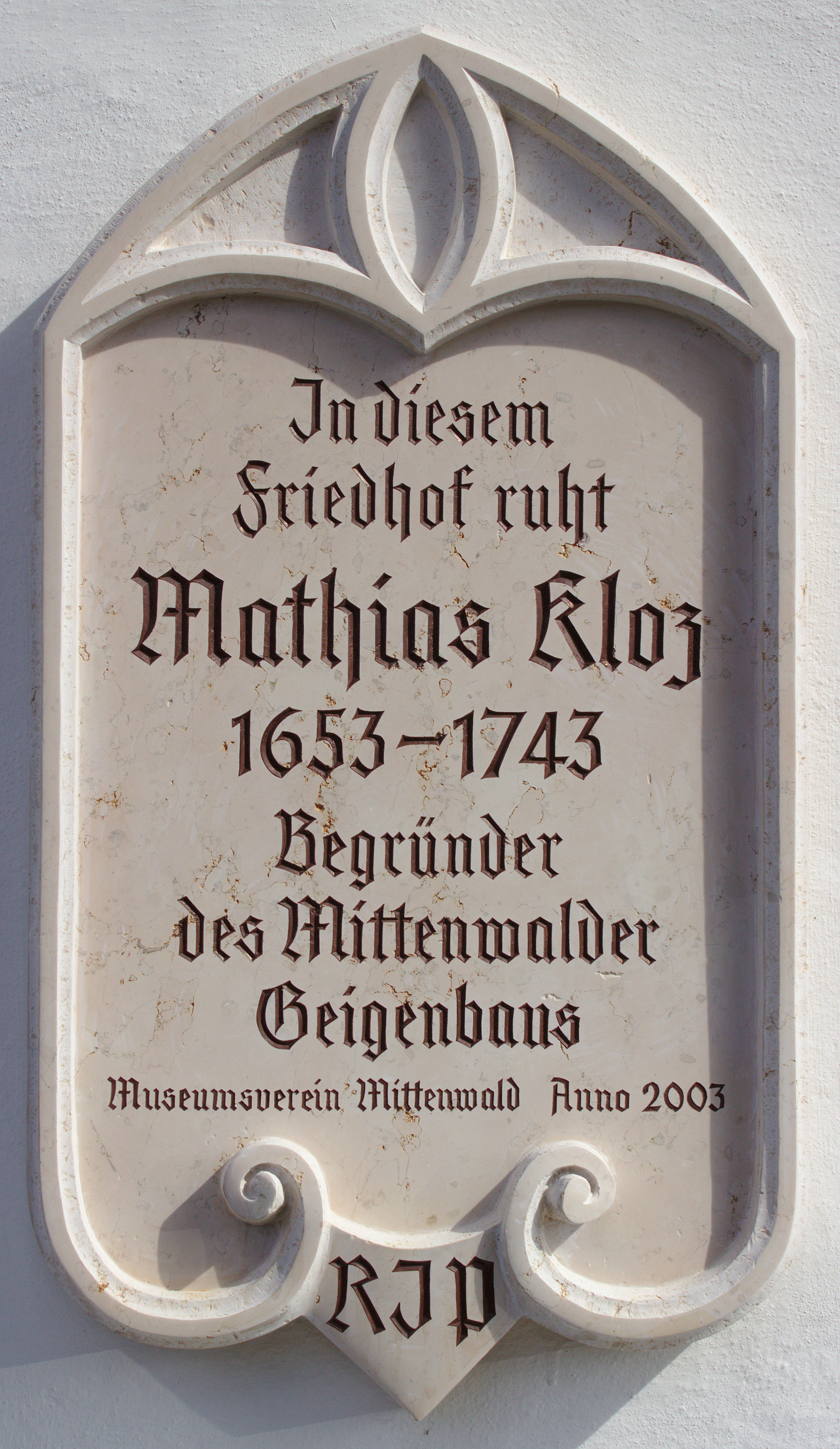
Memorial plaque for Mathias Klotz, founder of the Mittenwald violin making trade, on the St. Nikolaus church in Mittenwald, Bavaria

Matthias Klotz (1653–1743) was a luthier, a member of the Klotz family of violin makers that flourished in Mittenwald, Duchy of Bavaria as early as 1683.

== Biography ==
Matthias Klotz (with spelling variations Mathias Khlotz, Khloz, Cloz), was baptized on 11 June 1653 in Mittenwald's St. Peter and Paul Catholic church, the son of Urban Klotz (Vrbanus Cloz, 1627–1691), a tailor, and his wife Sophia (?-1681). He died in Mittenwald at age 90 on August 16, 1743. In Mittenwald documents he was repeatedly described as a world-renowned lute and violin maker. He is buried in the cemetery of the St. Nikolaus Church.

=== Early education ===
Klotz became interested in music and instruments in early childhood. Beginning at age 12, from 1672 to 1678, he took apprenticeship with master Giovanni Railich (Johann Railich), an Italian lute maker at Bottega di Lautaro al Santo in Padua, Italy.

In 1683, Klotz, now a skilled lute and violin maker, returned prosperous to Mittenwald and established his own workshop there.

== Style of craftsmanship ==
Klotz did not build most of his instruments in the classical Italian style, but made them similar to those of masters from Füssen (a town in Bavaria) and Swabia (Southern Germany). Certain elements of his violins reflect the style of the Tyrolean master luthier Jacob Stainer.

== Memorial ==
A bronze statue of Klotz stands in front of Mittenwald's landmark St. Peter and Paul's Church, at the mouth of the narrow street leading to the Violin-Making Museum (Geigenbaumuseum).
