= Baden bei Wien =

Baden
- Municipality
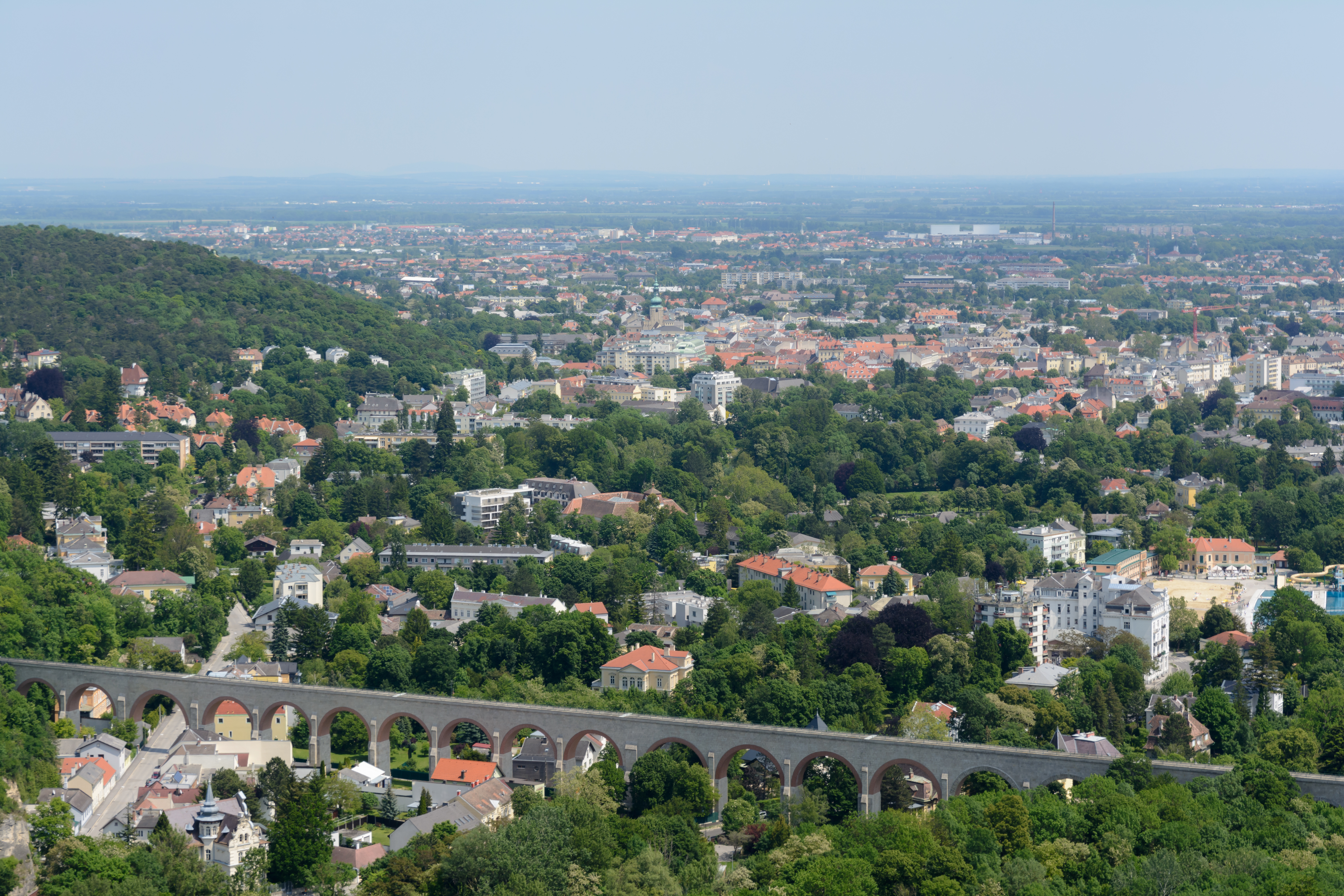
- Panorama of Baden with the aqueduct in the foreground

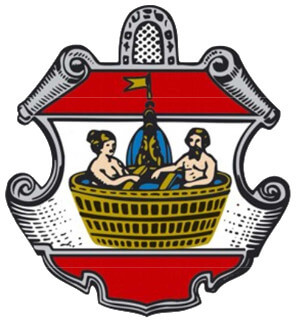
- Coat of arms

- Location within Austria Location within Lower Austria
- Coordinates: 48°00′27″N 16°14′04″E
- Country: Austria
- State: Lower Austria
- District: Baden

Government
  - Mayor: Carmen Jeitler-Cincelli (ÖVP)

Area
  - Total: 26.89 km^{2} (10.38 sq mi)
- Elevation: 230 m (750 ft)

Population (2025)
  - Total: 25,931
  - Density: 964.3/km^{2} (2,498/sq mi)
- Time zone: UTC+1 (CET)
  - Summer (DST): UTC+2 (CEST)
- Postal code: 2500
- Area code: 0 22 52
- Vehicle registration: BN
- Website: baden.at

UNESCO World Heritage Site
- Part of: The Great Spa Towns of Europe
- Criteria: Cultural: (ii)(iii)
- Reference: 1613
- Inscription: 2021 (44th Session)

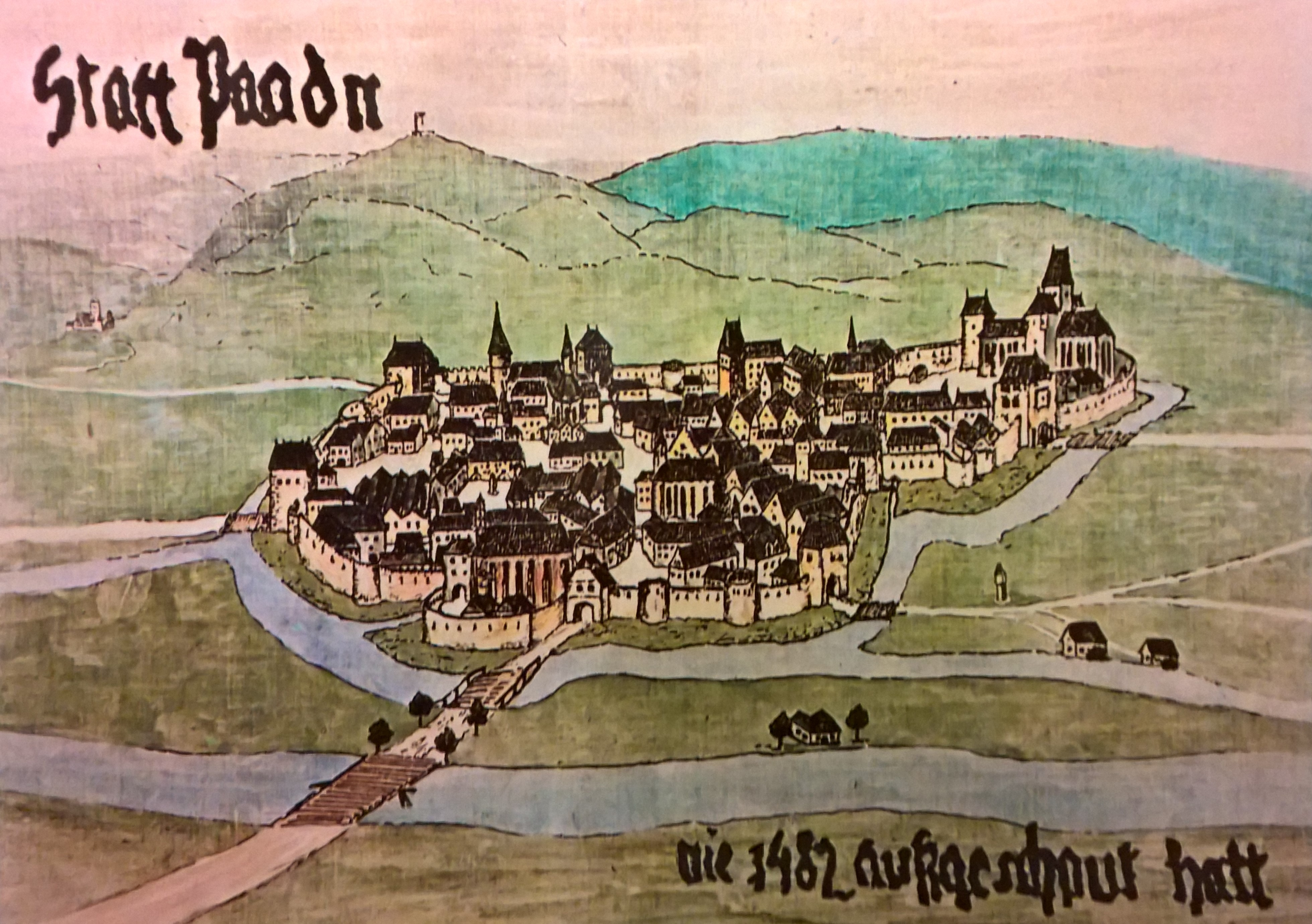
Contemporary illustration of Baden from 1482

Baden (Central Bavarian: Bodn), unofficially distinguished from other Badens as Baden bei Wien ([ˈbaːdn̩ baɪ̯ viːn]; 'Spa town near Vienna'), is a spa town in Austria. It serves as the capital of Baden District in the state of Lower Austria. Located about 26 km (16 mi) south of Vienna, the municipality consists of cadastral areas Baden, Braiten, Gamingerhof, Leesdorf, Mitterberg, Rauhenstein, and Weikersdorf.

In 2021, the town became part of the transnational UNESCO World Heritage Site under the name "Great Spa Towns of Europe" because of its famous medicinal springs and its architectural testimony to the international spa culture on the 18th and 19th centuries.

== Geography and Geology ==
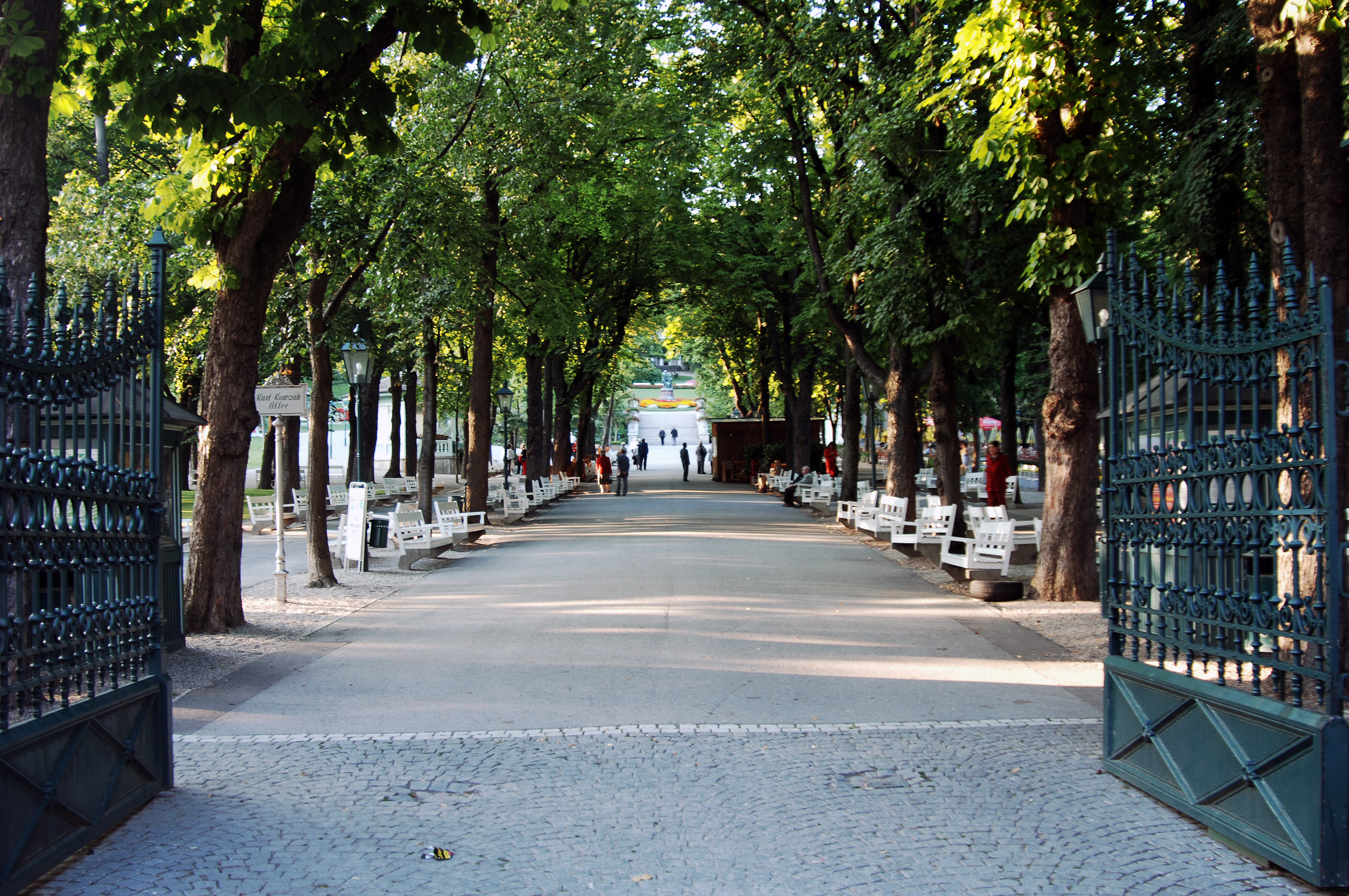
The "Spa Park" (Kurpark) entrance

Baden is located at the mouth of the Schwechat River's St Helena Valley (Helenental) in the Vienna Woods (Wienerwald) range. It takes its name from the area's 14 hot springs, which vary in temperature from 72 to 97 °F (22 to 36 °C) and contain mineral salts including calcium carbonate, calcium chloride and magnesium sulphate. They lie for the most part at the foot of Mt Calvary (Calvarienberg; 1,070 ft or 326 m) in the north-central part of town. These springs are caused by runoff from the Northern Limestone Alps and tectonic fissures within the Vienna Basin.

The highest point in the area is the Iron Gate (Eisernes Tor or Hoher Lindkogel), whose 2,825 ft (861 m) can be ascended in about three hours.

== History ==
The celebrity of Baden dates back to the days of the Romans, who knew it by the name of Aquae Cetiae or Thermae Pannonicae. Some ruins are still visible. The settlement was mentioned as Padun in a deed from AD 869. The nearby abbey of Heiligenkreuz's Romanesque church was constructed in the 11th century; it subsequently served as the burial place for members of the Babenberg family. The castle Rauheneck was constructed on the right bank of the river at the entrance to the valley in the 12th century; the castle Rauhenstein was built on the opposite bank at the same time. The town received its legal privileges in 1480. Although repeatedly sacked by Hungarians and Turks, it soon flourished again each time.

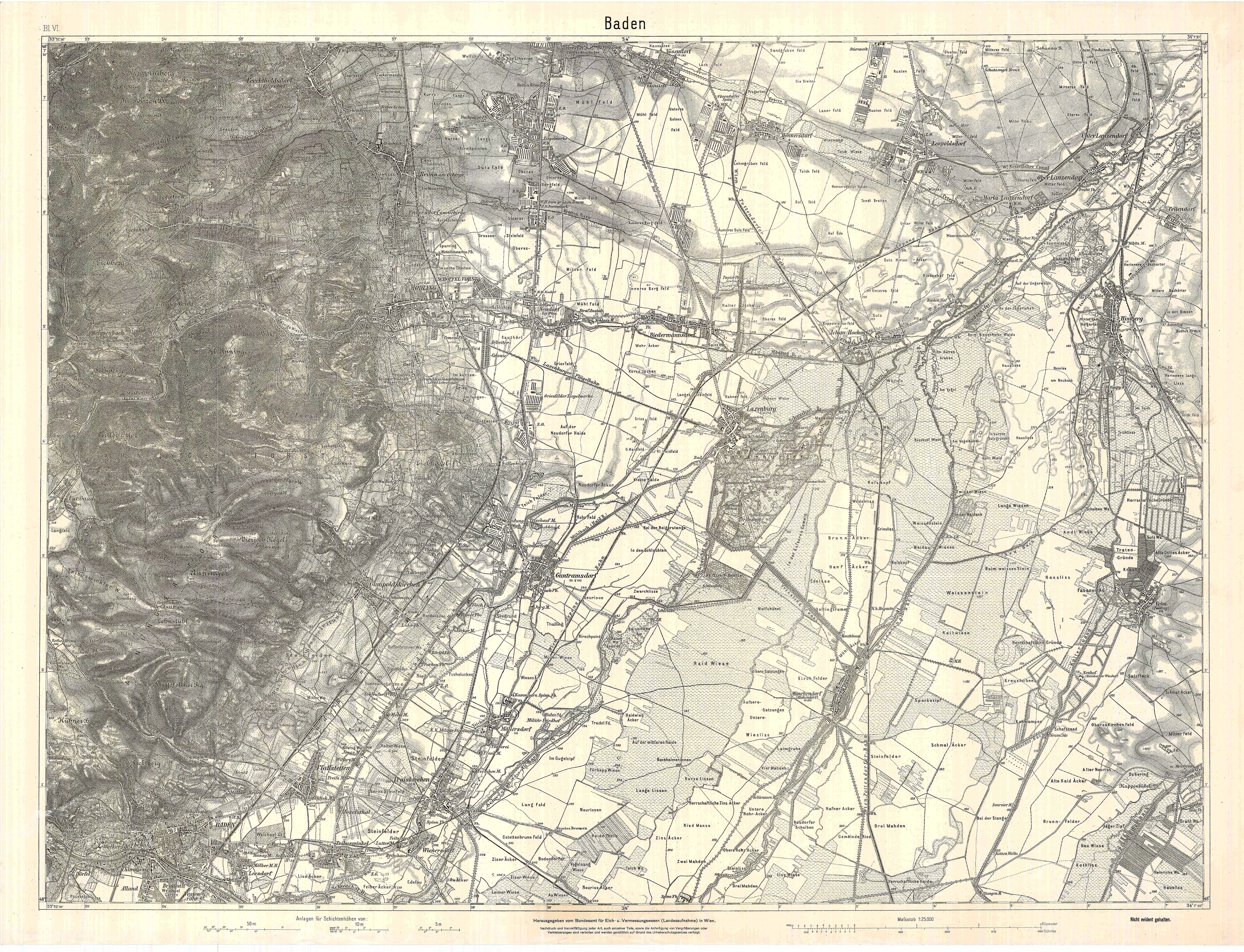
A map of Baden in 1901

The town was largely destroyed by a fire in 1812 but was excellently rebuilt in a Biedermeier style according to plans by architect Joseph Kornhäusel, it is therefore sometimes referred to as the "Biedermeierstadt". Archduke Charles, the victor of Aspern, constructed the Weilburg Palace at the foot of Rauheneck between 1820 and 1825. In the 19th century, it was connected to the railway running between Vienna and Graz, which led to thousands of Viennese visiting each year to take the waters, including members of the imperial family, who constructed extensive villas nearby. In 1820, the Sauerhof became the first freestanding spa hotel in Europe. The composer Ludwig van Beethoven stayed a number of times in Baden and his residences still form local tourist spots. The location at Rathausgasse 10 now forms a museum open to the public. (Note: Other street addresses include Antonsgasse 4, Braitnerstrasse 26, Frauengasse 10, Johannesgasse 12, Kaiser Franz Ring 9, and Weilburgstrasse 13.) Mayerling, a hunting lodge about 4 mi (6.4 km) up the valley, was the site of Crown Prince Rudolf's murder-suicide in 1889. Its primary export in the 19th century were steel razors, which were reckoned of excellent quality.

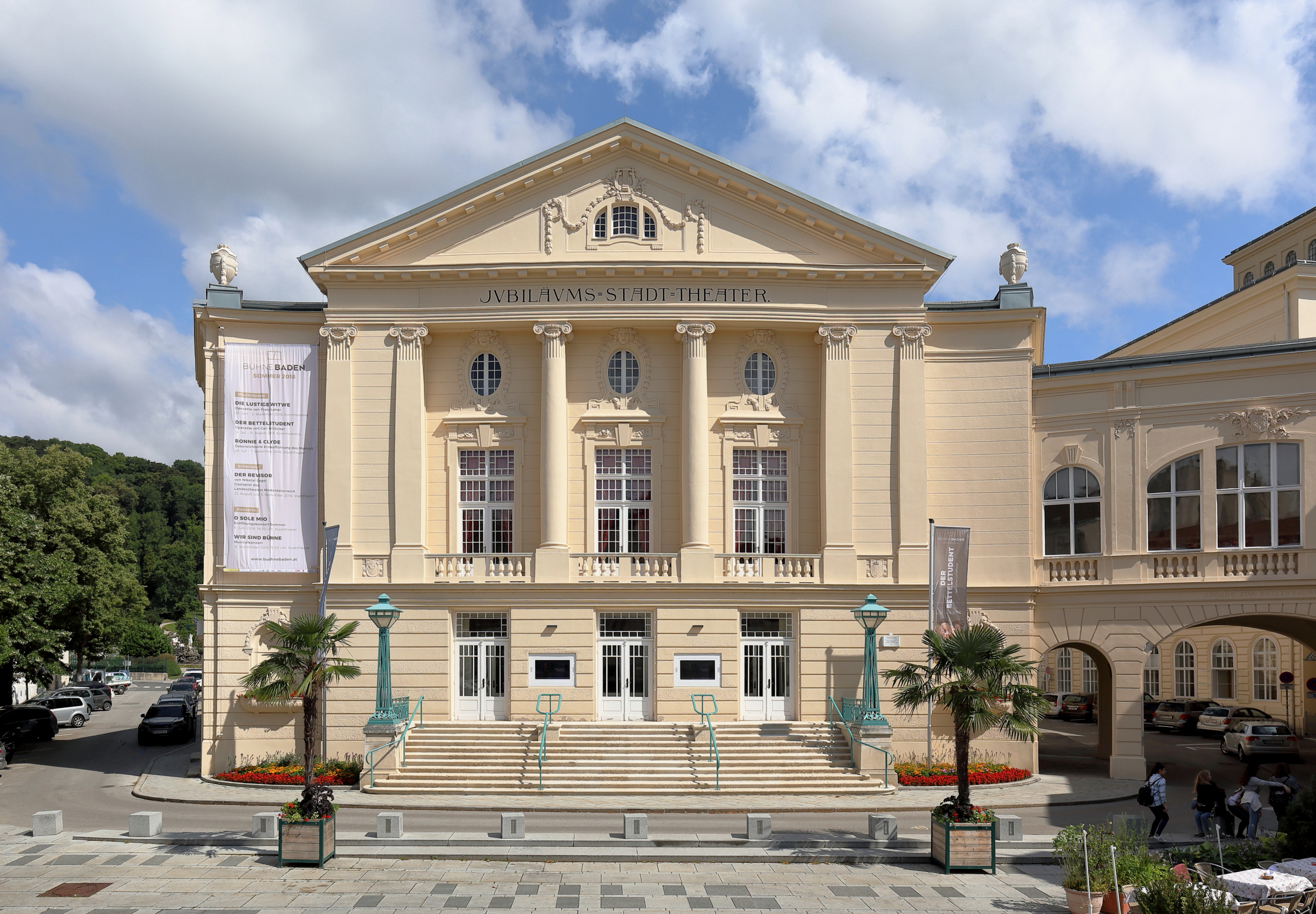
The City Theater (Stadttheater)

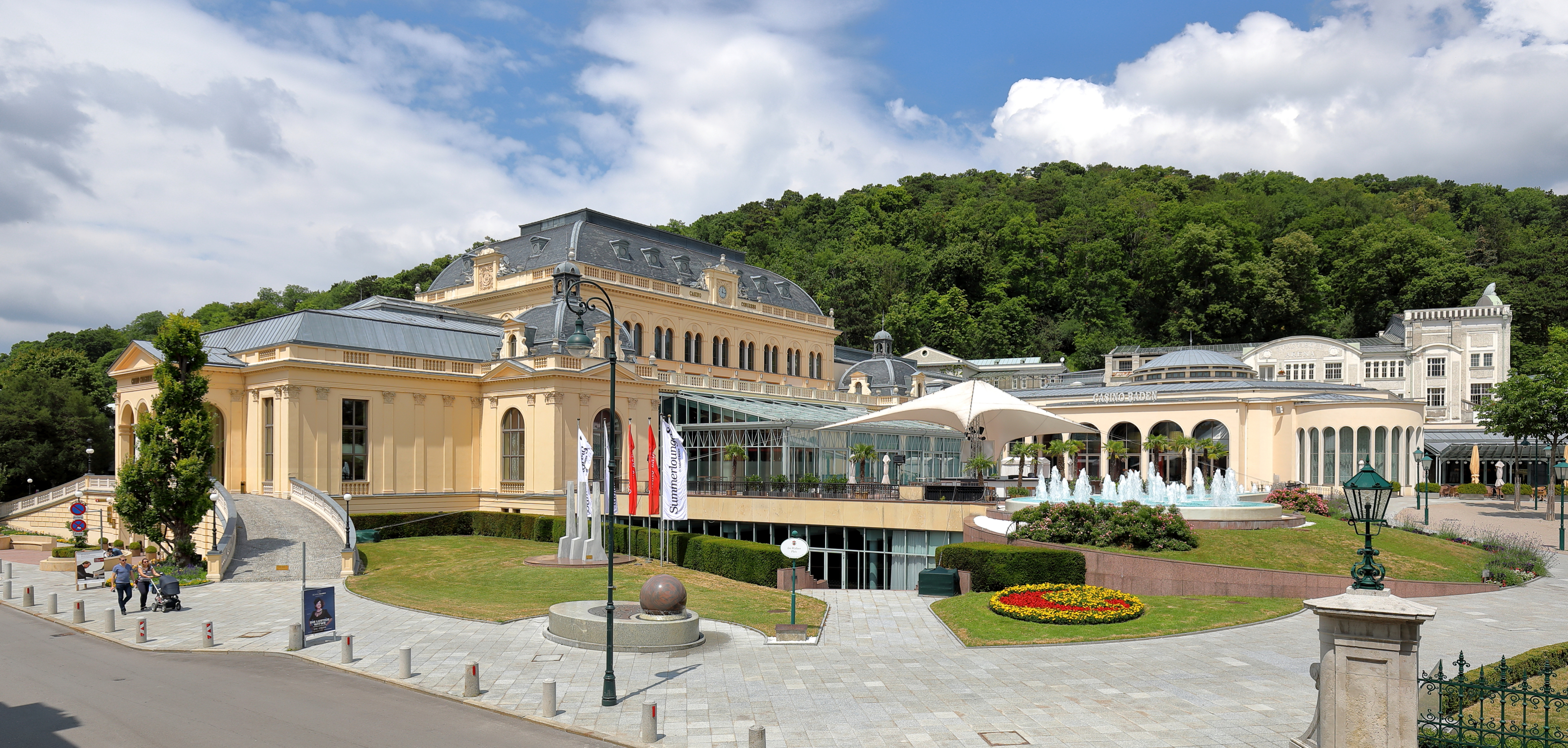
The 1934 casino

The town boasted a theater, military hospital, and casino, all constructed in the late 1800s and early 1900s. The City Theater (Stadttheater) was built in 1909 by Ferdinand Fellner. By the time of the First World War, Baden was Vienna's principal resort: 20 000 came each year, double the town's local population. In addition to a modern "spa house" (Kurhaus), there were 15 separate bathing establishments and several parks. During the war, Baden served as a temporary seat of the Austro-Hungarian high command. A new casino in 1934 made the town the premier resort throughout Austria. The Château Weilburg was destroyed during World War II. After World War II, Baden served as the headquarters of Soviet forces within occupied Austria until 1955.

== Transport ==
Baden can be reached by the Süd Autobahn (A2). It lies on the Südbahn (Southern Railway), the Baden railway station is served by S-Bahn, regional trains, and the Cityjet Xpress train connecting it directly to Vienna and Wiener Neustadt every 30 minutes during peak hours.

It also the terminus of the local Badner Bahn tram-train.

== Politics ==
The municipal council (Gemeinderat) consists of 41 seats. Since the 2025 Lower Austrian local elections, the council is made up of the following parties and lists:

- Austrian People's Party (ÖVP): 10 seats
- Social Democratic Party of Austria (SPÖ): 7 seats
- We Badener - Citizen List Jowi Trenner (LIST): 7 seats
- The Greens - The Green Alternative (GRÜNE): 7 seats
- Freedom Party of Austria (FPÖ): 6 seats
- NEOS - The New Austria and Liberal Forum (NEOS): 4 seats

Baden bei Wien

Climate chart (precipitation, max. and min. temperature)
J	F	M	A	M	J	J	A	S	O	N	D
35 3 −3	34 6 −2	49 10 2	55 15 5	62 21 10	70 23 13	67 26 15	60 25 15	57 21 11	42 15 6	52 8 2	41 4 −1
- █ Average max. and min. temperatures in °C
- █ Precipitation totals in mm
- Source: ZAMG
Imperial conversion
J	F	M	A	M	J	J	A	S	O	N	D
1.4 37 27	1.3 43 28	1.9 50 36	2.2 59 41	2.4 70 50	2.8 73 55	2.6 79 59	2.4 77 59	2.2 70 52	1.7 59 43	2 46 36	1.6 39 30
- █ Average max. and min. temperatures in °F
- █ Precipitation totals in inches

== Population ==
Historical population
Year	Pop.	±%
1971	22,727	—
1981	23,140	+1.8%
1991	23,488	+1.5%
2001	24,518	+4.4%
2011	25,120	+2.5%
2021	25,817	+2.8%
2025	25,931	+0.4%

== Notable people ==
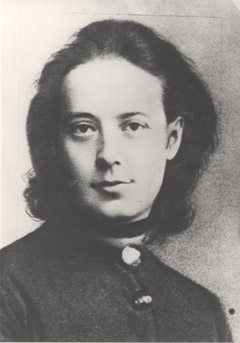
Marianne Hainisch, 1872

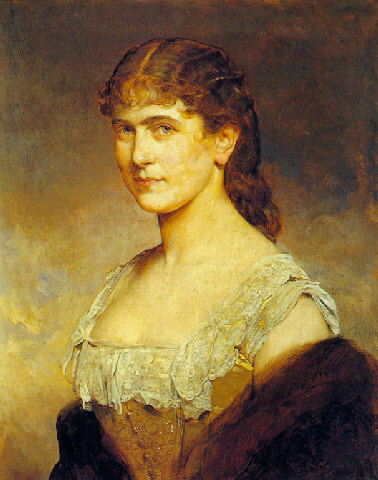
painting of Katharina Schratt

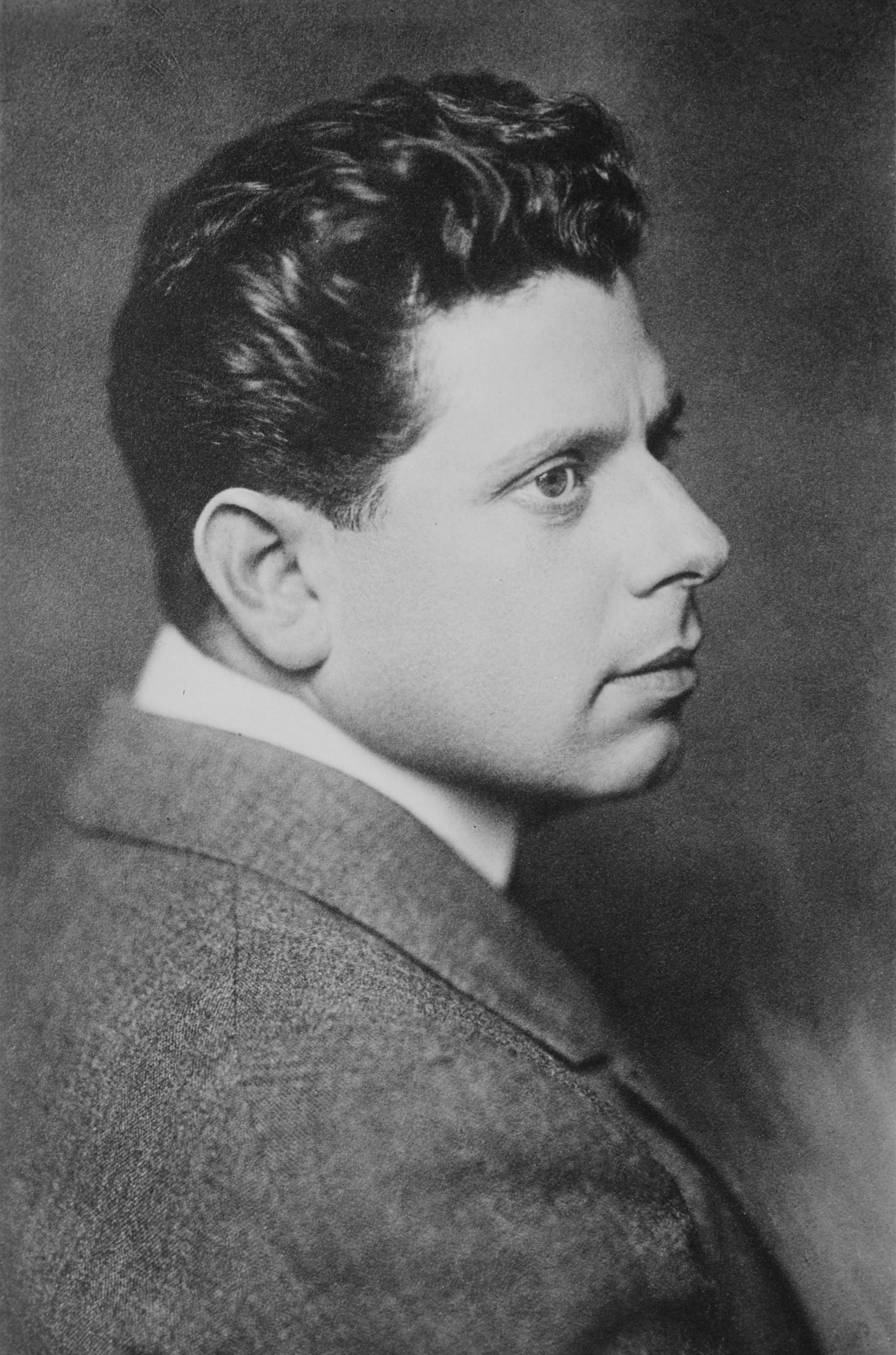
Max Reinhardt, 1911

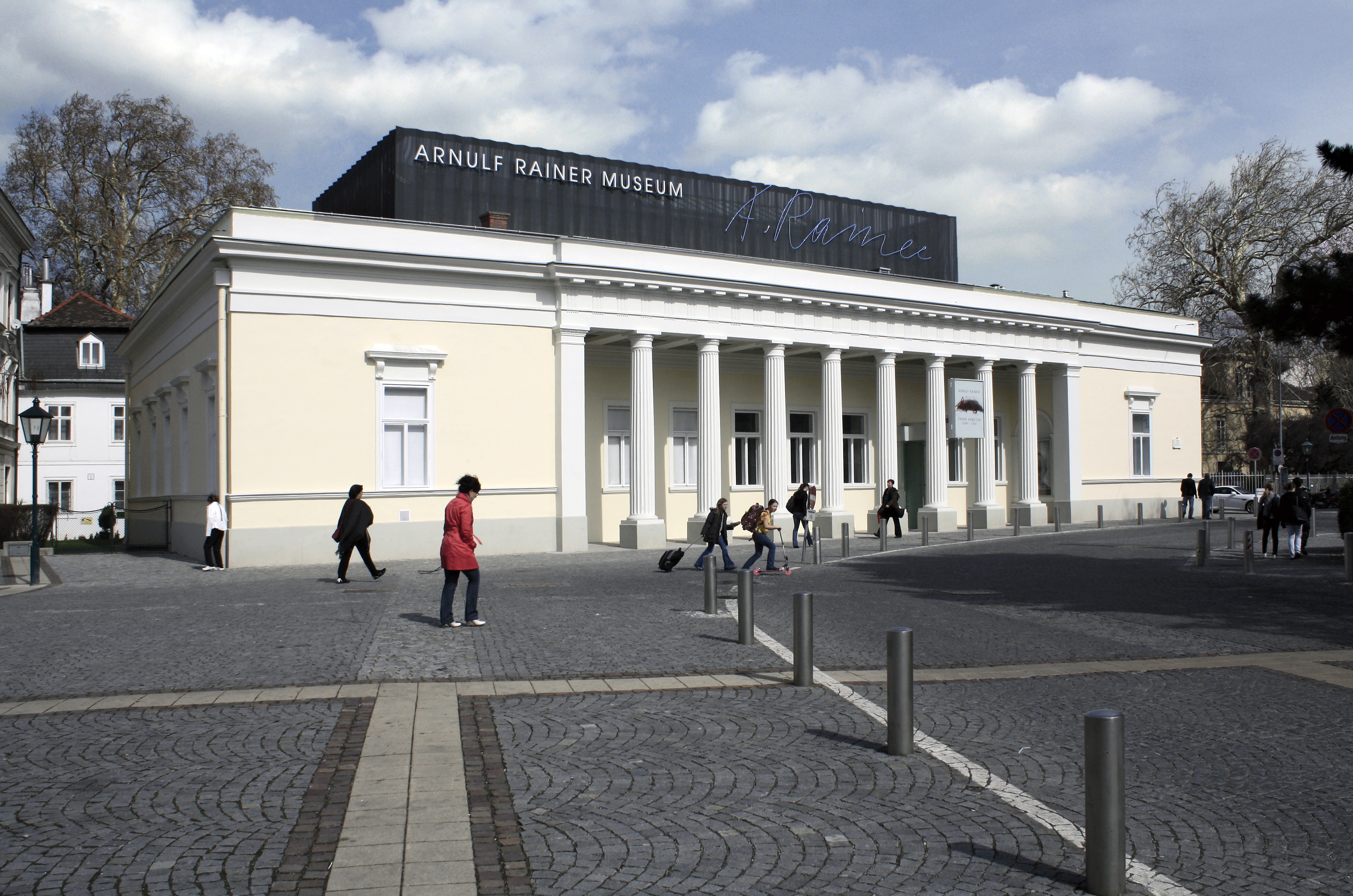
Arnulf Rainer Museum

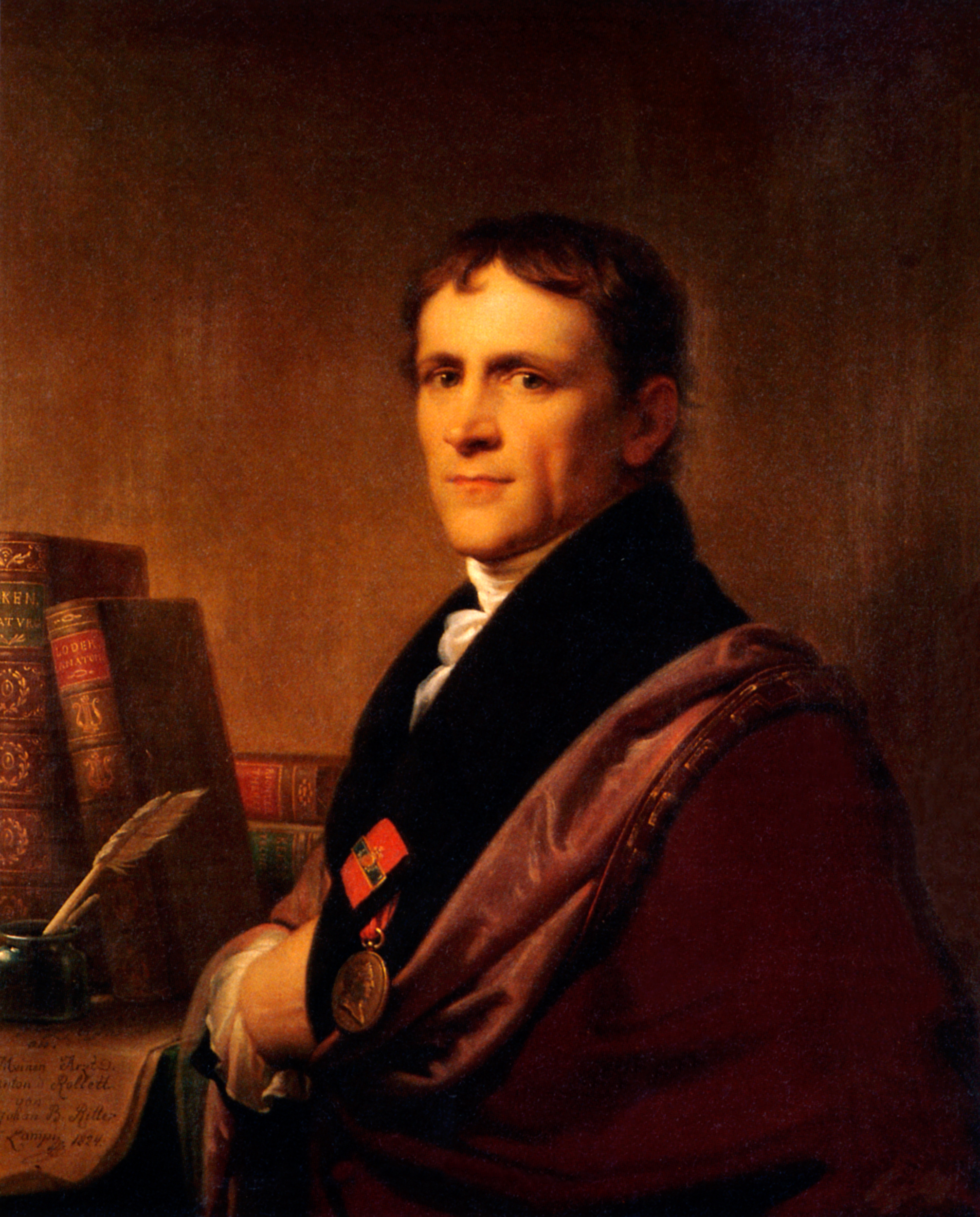
painting of Georg Anton Rollett, 1824

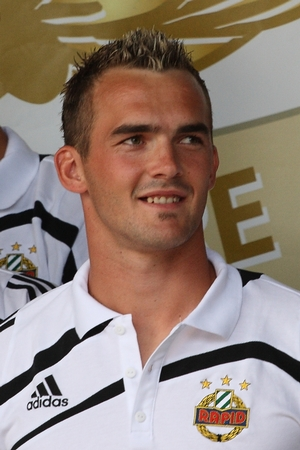
Erwin Hoffer, 2009

=== Public service ===
- Marianne Hainisch (1839–1936), Austrian feminist, women's rights activist
- Anton Maria Schwartz (1852–1929), Catholic priest, beatified by Pope John Paul II in 1998.
- Heinrich von Lützow, (DE Wiki) (1852–1935) Austro-Hungarian diplomat
- Mirabehn (1892–1982), real name Madeleine Slade Indian freedom fighter, lived locally
- Paul Wittek (1894-1978), Orientalist and historian, wrote a popular thesis on the rise of the Ottoman Empire
- Archduke Carl Ludwig of Austria (1918–2007), 5th child of Charles I of Austria and Zita von Bourbon-Parma
- Charlotte Fritz (1918–2003), an Austrian Righteous Among the Nations.
- Robert Weiß (1920–1944). Luftwaffe fighter pilot during WWII; fighter ace
- Theodor Tomandl, (DE Wiki) (born 1933), Austrian jurisprudent
- Herbert Schambeck (1934 - 2023), an Austrian legal scholar and politician (ÖVP)
- Karin Scheele (born 1968), Austrian social democratic politician and previously an MEP
- Sophie Schulz (1905–1975), Austrian politician

=== Arts ===
- Ignaz Vitzthumb (1724–1816, Brussels), Austrian composer; acted in the Austrian Netherlands
- Amalia Schütz Oldosi (1803–1852), Austrian soprano, died locally
- Caterina Canzi (1805–1890), opera singer
- Hermann Rollett, (DE Wiki) (1819–1904), Vormärz-poet, writer on art, archivist of the city
- Johann Baptist Klerr (1830–1875), composer and kapellmeister
- Karel Komzák II (1850–1905), Czech-Austrian composer, died locally
- Katharina Schratt (1853–1940), actress, a confidante of Emperor Franz Joseph.
- Rosa Papier (1859–1932), Austrian opera singer and singing-educator
- Jakob Pazeller, (DE Wiki) (1869–1957), Austrian composer
- Mizzi Griebl (1872–1952), Austrian singer and actress
- (Maximilian) Hugo Bettauer (1872–1925), Austrian writer
- Max Reinhardt (1873–1943), born Maximilian Goldmann, theatre director and theatre manager
- Josef Müllner (1879–1968), Austrian sculptor
- Max Kuttner, (DE Wiki) (1883–1953), German opera- and operetta tenor, gramophone/record- and radio singer
- Vincent Bach (1890–1976), virtuoso trumpeter and brass instrument maker
- George Hoellering (1897–1980), Austrian-British author and film director.
- Louis V. Arco (1899–1975), born Lutz Altschul, Austrian actor
- Lucie Englisch (1902–1965), Austrian actress
- Franz Josef Reinl, (DE Wiki) (1903–1977), Austrian composer
- Erik Werba (1918–1992), Austrian pianist, composer and academic teacher.
- Maximilian Melcher, (DE Wiki) (1922–2002), artist and lecturer
- Ralph Wiener, (DE Wiki) (1924–2024), Kabarettist, author
- Eduard Melkus (born 1928), Austrian violinist and violist
- Karl Pfeifer (1928–2023), Austrian journalist
- Arnulf Rainer (1929–2025), Austrian painter
- Hertha Martin, (DE Wiki) (1930–2004), Austrian actress
- Elisabet Woska, (DE Wiki) (1938–2013), actress
- Sigi Maron, (DE Wiki) (1944–2016), singer-songwriter
- Marlene Streeruwitz (born 1950), Austrian playwright, novelist, poet and short story writer
- Béla Mavrák (born 1966), Hungarian tenor singer

=== Science & business ===
- Georg Anton Rollett (1778–1842), Austrian collector, natural scientist and doctor
- Alexander Rollett (1834–1903), Austrian physiologist and histologist
- Karl Landsteiner (1868–1943), an Austrian American biologist, physician, and immunologist.
- Karl Holdhaus (1883–1975), Austrian entomologist, specialised in Coleoptera.
- Josef Frank (1885–1967), Austrian-Swedish architect
- Franz Reznicek (1903-??), Austrian architect

=== Sport ===
- Erwin Kohn (1911-1994), an international table tennis player, emigrated to England & Argentina
- Heribert Meisel, (DE Wiki) (1920–1966), famous Austrian sport-journalist and sport-presenter of the ORF and ZDF
- Willi End, (DE Wiki) (1921–2013), Austrian mountaineer
- Thomas Vanek (born 1984), retired professional ice hockey player who mostly played in the NHL
- Daniel Dunst (born 1984), a former Austrian footballer who played over 250 games
- Erwin "Jimmy" Hoffer (born 1987), footballer, played over 370 games and 28 for Austria
- Besian Idrizaj (1987–2010), Austrian football player, played 59 games
- Markus Lackner (born 1991), an Austrian footballer who has played over 270 games
- Thomas Ebner (born 1992), an Austrian footballer who has played over 350 games
