= Carabus obsoletus carpathicus =

Scientific classification
- Domain: Eukaryota
- Kingdom: Animalia
- Phylum: Arthropoda
- Class: Insecta
- Order: Coleoptera
- Suborder: Adephaga
- Family: Carabidae
- Genus: Carabus
- Species: C. obsoletus
- Subspecies: C. o. carpathicus

Trinomial name
- Carabus obsoletus carpathicus Palliardi, 1825

Subspecies of beetle

Carabus obsoletus carpathicus is a subspecies of beetle from family Carabidae, found in Czech Republic, Moldova, Romania, and Ukraine.
