= Carabus obsoletus =

Scientific classification
- Domain: Eukaryota
- Kingdom: Animalia
- Phylum: Arthropoda
- Class: Insecta
- Order: Coleoptera
- Suborder: Adephaga
- Family: Carabidae
- Genus: Carabus
- Species: C. obsoletus

Binomial name
- Carabus obsoletus Sturm, 1815

Species of beetle

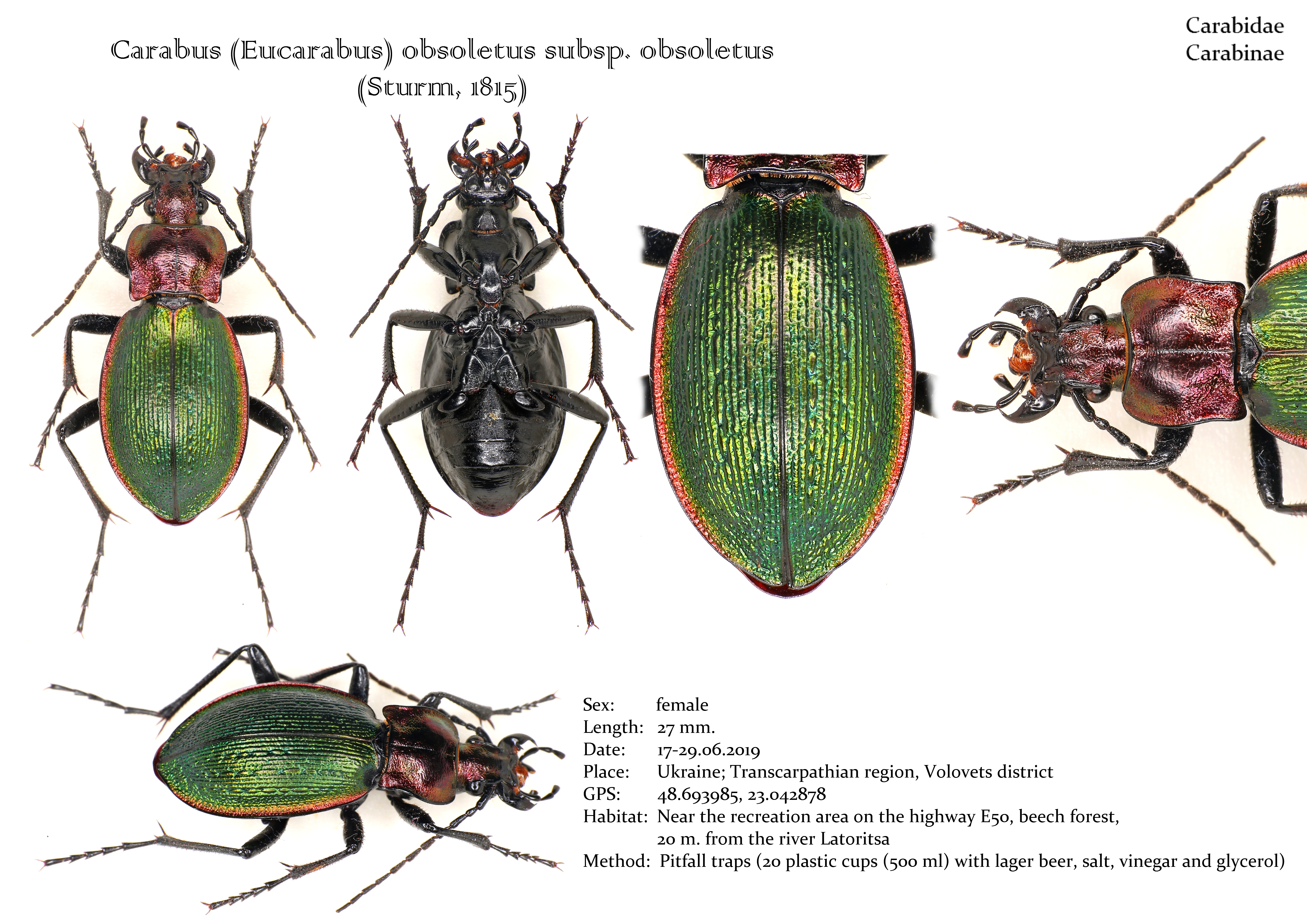
Carabus (Eucarabus) obsoletus

Carabus obsoletus is a species of black-coloured beetle from family Carabidae, found in Czech Republic, Hungary, Moldova, Romania, Slovakia, Ukraine.

== Subspecies ==
- Carabus obsoletus carpathicus
- Carabus obsoletus fossulifer
- Carabus obsoletus nagyagensis
- Carabus obsoletus obsoletus
- Carabus obsoletus prunneri
- Carabus obsoletus uhligi
