= Carabus obsoletus obsoletus =

Scientific classification
- Domain: Eukaryota
- Kingdom: Animalia
- Phylum: Arthropoda
- Class: Insecta
- Order: Coleoptera
- Suborder: Adephaga
- Family: Carabidae
- Genus: Carabus
- Species: C. obsoletus
- Subspecies: C. o. obsoletus

Trinomial name
- Carabus obsoletus obsoletus Sturm, 1815

Subspecies of beetle

Carabus obsoletus obsoletus is a subspecies of ground beetle from family Carabidae, found in Poland, Romania, Slovakia, and Ukraine.
