= Max Seiling =

German engineer and writer (1852–1928)

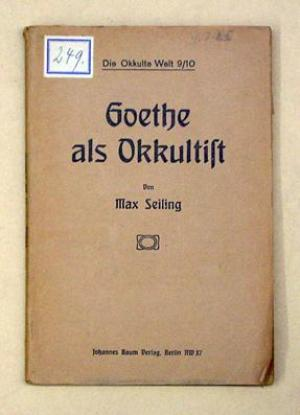
Max Seiling's work Goethe als Okkultist

Max Seiling (1852–1928) was a German engineer and writer.

== Life and career ==
Born in Mittenwald, Max Seiling emigrated, after having studied at the Ludwig-Maximilians-Universität München, to the Grand Duchy of Finland where he became a professor at a polytechnic school. Because of this activity, he was promoted to Privy Councillor of the Russian crown.

Seiling was involved in the anthroposophist movement and was initially an enthusiastic supporter, but eventually became one of their most ardent opponents. In his later years, he became a devout Roman Catholic. His wife was Helene Seiling, who wrote a cookbook for vegetarians.

Seiling died in Speyer.

== Works ==
- Mainlander: Ein Neuer Messias (München, 1888)
- Meine Erfahrungen auf dem Gebiet des Spiritismus 1898
- Goethe und der Materialismus (Leipzig, 1904)
- Theosophie und Christentum (Berlin, 1910)
- Richard Wagner (Leipzig, 1911)
- Ernst Haeckel und der „Spiritismus“, Ein Protest (1914)
- Goethe als Okkultist (Leipzig, 1919)
