= Carabus obsoletus fossulifer =

Scientific classification
- Domain: Eukaryota
- Kingdom: Animalia
- Phylum: Arthropoda
- Class: Insecta
- Order: Coleoptera
- Suborder: Adephaga
- Family: Carabidae
- Genus: Carabus
- Species: C. obsoletus
- Subspecies: C. o. fossulifer

Trinomial name
- Carabus obsoletus fossulifer Fleischer, 1893

Subspecies of beetle

Carabus obsoletus fossulifer is a subspecies of ground beetle in the subfamily Carabinae that might be extinct throughout Europe.
