= Klotz (surname) =

Klotz as a surname (German for block) can refer to:

- Klotz (violin makers), a family of German violin makers (also spelt Kloz and Cloz)

== People ==
- Adolf Klotz, Croatian linguist and writer
- August Klett (Pseudonym: August Klotz), German artist
- Christian Adolph Klotz (1738–1771), German philosopher and writer
- Christopher Klotz (born 1984), American soccer player
- Clemens Klotz (1886–1969), German architect
- Clyde Klotz (born 1961), art director
- Florence Klotz (1920–2006), costume designer
- Frank Klotz (born 1950), American Air Force general
- Hans Klotz (1900–1987), German organist and musicologist
- Ignatius Klotz (1843–1911), American farmer and politician
- Jeff S. Klotz (born 1990), German author, publisher, museum director and entrepreneur
- Józef Klotz (1900–1941), Polish footballer
- Karlheinz Klotz (born 1950), German sprinter
- Louis Klotz, basketball player
- Louis-Lucien Klotz (1868–1930), French politician
- Martin Klotz (fl. 1800), Austrian mountaineer
- Mathias Klotz (born 1965), Chilean architect
- Vuk Lungulov-Klotz (born 1994), Chilean-Serbian filmmaker
- Matthew Klotz (born 1996), American male deaf swimmer and reality television contestant.
- Nicolas Klotz (born 1954), French film director
- Otto Julius Klotz (1852–1923), Canadian astronomer and Dominion Surveyor
- Red Klotz (1920–2014), American basketball player
- Reinhold Klotz (1807–1870), German classical scholar
- Robert Klotz (1819–1895), American politician
- Sebastian Klotz (1696–1775), violin maker
- Sibyll-Anka Klotz (born 1961), German politician
- Stevo Klotz (born 2001), American football player
- Suzanne Klotz (born 1944), artist
- Ulrike Klotz (born 1970), German gymnast

== Characters ==
- Hans Klot, from the French television series Code Lyoko
- Roger Klotz, from the American television series Doug

== See also ==
- Cloots
