= Carabus obsoletus nagyagensis =

Scientific classification
- Domain: Eukaryota
- Kingdom: Animalia
- Phylum: Arthropoda
- Class: Insecta
- Order: Coleoptera
- Suborder: Adephaga
- Family: Carabidae
- Genus: Carabus
- Species: C. obsoletus
- Subspecies: C. o. nagyagensis

Trinomial name
- Carabus obsoletus nagyagensis Seidlitz, 1888

Subspecies of beetle

Carabus obsoletus nagyagensis is a subspecies of ground beetle in the subfamily Carabinae that is endemic to Romania. The species are either brown or dark blue coloured.
