= Carabus obsoletus prunneri =

Scientific classification
- Domain: Eukaryota
- Kingdom: Animalia
- Phylum: Arthropoda
- Class: Insecta
- Order: Coleoptera
- Suborder: Adephaga
- Family: Carabidae
- Genus: Carabus
- Species: C. obsoletus
- Subspecies: C. o. prunneri

Trinomial name
- Carabus obsoletus prunneri Mallasz, 1901

Subspecies of beetle

Carabus obsoletus prunneri is a subspecies of ground beetle in the subfamily Carabinae that can be found in Hungary and Romania.
