= Sebastian Klotz =

Sebastian Klotz (18 January 1696 – 20 January 1775) was a German violin maker, one of three sons of Mathias Klotz.

Klotz was born in Mittenwald on 18 January 1696, the second son of Mathias Klotz, from whom he learnt the art of violin making. On 15 May 1724, he married Maria Rosina Mayr, with whom he had eleven children. Three of these children (Georg II Karl, Aegidius Sebastian and Joseph I Thomas) continued the family tradition of violin making. Other individuals trained by Klotz include Anton and Andreas Gäßler and Johann Georg Psenner.

== See also ==
- Klotz (violin makers)
