= Félicien Henry Caignart de Saulcy =

French entomologist (1832–1912)

Félicien Henry Caignart de Saulcy (1832-1912) was a French entomologist specialising in Coleoptera. He was especially interested in the beetle fauna of caves. His collection of Scydmaenidae, Trechinae, Bathysciinae, Liodidae, Staphylinidae, Pselaphidae and Catopidae is in the Muséum national d'histoire naturelle, in Paris. He died in Metz.

== Works ==
- Saulcy, F.H.C. (1876). Species des Paussides, Clavigérides, Psélaphides & Scydménides de l'Europe et des pays circonvoisins. Bull. Soc. Hist. Nat. Metz 14: 25-100
