= Mittenwald =

- Municipality
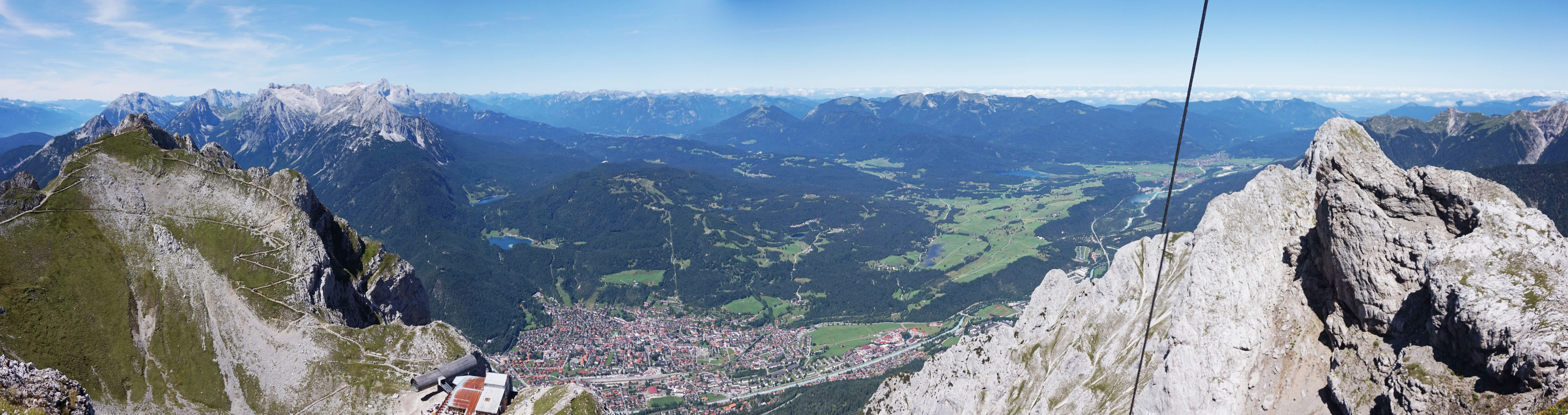
- Mittenwald seen from Westliche Karwendelspitze

- Coat of arms

- Location of Mittenwald within Garmisch-Partenkirchen district
- Interactive map of Mittenwald
- Location within Germany Location within Bavaria
- Coordinates: 47°25′N 11°15′E
- Country: Germany
- State: Bavaria
- Admin. region: Oberbayern
- District: Garmisch-Partenkirchen

Government
  - Mayor (2020–26): Enrico Corongiu (SPD)

Area
  - Total: 132.85 km^{2} (51.29 sq mi)
- Elevation: 923 m (3,028 ft)

Population (2025-12-31)
  - Total: 7,400
  - Density: 56/km^{2} (140/sq mi)
- Time zone: UTC+01:00 (CET)
  - Summer (DST): UTC+02:00 (CEST)
- Postal codes: 82481
- Dialling codes: 08823
- Vehicle registration: GAP
- Website: www.mittenwald.de

Mittenwald (German pronunciation: [ˈmɪtn̩ˌvalt]) is a German municipality in the district of Garmisch-Partenkirchen, in Bavaria.

== Geography ==
Mittenwald is located approximately 16 kilometres to the south-east of Garmisch-Partenkirchen. It is situated in the Valley of the river Isar, by the northern foothills of the Alps, on the route between the old banking and commercial centre of Augsburg, to the north, and Innsbruck to the south-east, beyond which is the Brenner Pass and the route to Lombardy, another region with a rich commercial past and present.

== History ==
Mittenwald, along with Garmisch-Partenkirchen to the west, was acquired by the Prince-Bishopric of Freising in the late 14th century and the "crowned Aethiopian" head that is part of Mittenwald's coat of arms recalls that 400-year association that ended when the Prince-Bishopric was secularized in 1802-03 and its territory annexed to Bavaria.

Mittenwald's location as an important transit centre on a relatively low and predictable Mountain pass has been a defining feature of the area for at least two thousand years.

== Violin makers ==
Mittenwald is famous for the manufacture of violins, violas and cellos which began in the mid-17th century by the Klotz workshop. Matthias I Klotz founded the Mittenwald school of violin making. Aegidius Klotz is believed to have crafted the personal violin of Wolfgang Amadeus Mozart. Eduard Melkus played on an unaltered violin by Aegidius Klotz.

== Notable places ==
The most significant landmark in the village is the pink colored Roman Catholic church of Saints Peter and Paul, which is typical of the region. The church and many of the surrounding buildings, both businesses and private residences, are decorated with elaborate paintings on the exterior walls. Near the Luttenseekaserne there is a monument honoring the participants of the Slutsk Defence Action.

== Notable people ==
- Matthias Klotz (1640 in Mittenwald - 1696) violin maker
- Max Seiling (1852 in Mittenwald – 1928) a German engineer and writer
- Georg Schreyögg (1870–1934) a German sculptor, brought up in Mittenwald
- Max Rieger (born 1946 in Mittenwald) a German former alpine skier who competed in the 1968 Winter Olympics and 1972 Winter Olympics
- Dieter Berkmann (born 1950 in Mittenwald) a German former cyclist, competed at the 1972 Summer Olympics and 1976 Summer Olympics
- Traudl Maurer (born 1961 in Mittenwald) a German ski mountaineer and long-distance runner.

== Twin City ==
- Wyk auf Föhr, Germany
