= Georg Schreyögg =

- Born: 13 August 1870; Aitrang, Bavaria
- Died: 7 July 1934; Munich, Bavaria, Germany
- Education: Königliche Kunstgewerbeschule, Munich and the Academy of Fine Arts, Munich
- Occupation: sculptor
- Spouse: Elisabeth von Barton (1881–1957)
- Children: Radulf 1905; Gertraut 1907; Jörg 1914
- Parent(s): Mathäus Schreyögg (1831–?); Kreszentia Marie Jörg (1833–1899)

Georg Schreyögg (13 August 1870 – 7 July 1934) was a German sculptor. One of his better known surviving works is the 1907 St Barbara War Memorial in Koblenz, taken down to make way for a new road in 1956 but returned to a site in the city close to its original location in 2014.

== Life ==
Georg Schreyögg was born in Aitrang, a village in the Alpine foothills near Kempten. He grew up in Mittenwald, however, a small but prosperous transit town southeast of Partenkirchen, along the mountain road towards the Brenner Pass and, beyond that, Lombardy. Mittenwald was (and is) a town with a long craft tradition of wood carving and violin making. Georg was the youngest son of the five recorded children born to Mathäus Schreyögg (1831–?), identified variously as an innkeeper and a master baker, and his wife, born Kreszentia Marie Jörg (1833–1899).

Starting in 1884, Georg Schreyögg attended the wood carving school in Partenkirchen. He then attended successively the Royal Academy of Applied Arts ("Königliche Kunstgewerbeschule") and the Academy of Fine Arts ("Akademie der Bildenden Künste") in Munich, where his teachers included Adolf von Hildebrand and Wilhelm von Rümann.

Between 1901 and 1908, Georg Schreyögg worked as a freelance sculptor, based in Munich. During this period, in 1905 he married Elisabeth von Barton (1881–1957). The two of them had three recorded children, born between 1905 and 1914.

In Munich, Georg Schreyögg attracted royal favour, which took the practical form of a private bursary provided by the Prince Regent. This enabled him to undertake a year's stay in Italy during 1908/09, which appears to have focused, in particular, on Florence and Rome.

In 1909 he relocated to Karlsruhe where he took a job as professor at the Academy for Applied Arts ("Kunstgewerbeschule") in succession to Fridolin Dietsche. Between 1909 and 1912 he drafted several designs for the prestigious Karlsruhe Maiolica producer. Between 1911 and 1914 he was teaching at the Women's Artists' College ("Malerinnenschule") in Karlsruhe.

In 1920 the Academy for Applied Arts in Karlsruhe became the Regional Arts Academy ("Landeskunstschule") and Georg Schreyögg became its Professor for Sculpture. His pupils here included Franz Danskin, Otto Schneider and Karl Seckinger.

== Works ==
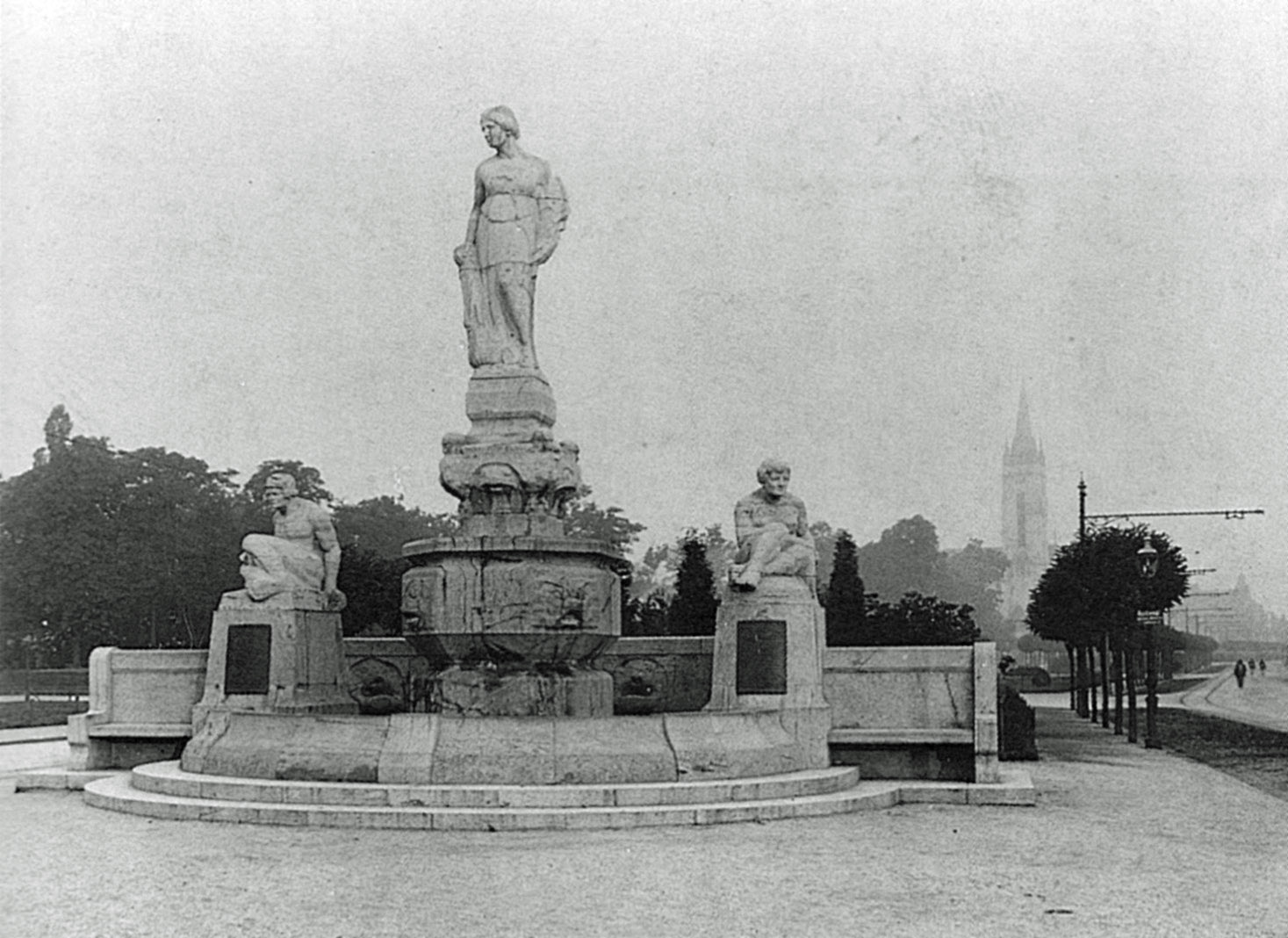
The St Barbara War Memorial in Koblenz

The spectrum of his work was broad, extending from graves and war memorials to decorations on buildings, fountains and smaller statues. In Karlsruhe he created the reliefs in the Carl Hofer Business School (1912–1914), the relief "Youth and age" (1912 – repositioned to the city park in 1933), the reliefs at the Exhibition Hall (1915) and the "Flora" statue at the entrance to the city park (1918/19). Elsewhere, his works included the "Crucifixion Group" (1903) at the Munich Waldfriedhof (cemetery) and the St Barbara War Memorial in Koblenz.

== Awards and honours ==
On 10 August 1930, Schreyögg was made an honorary citizen of Mittenwald in recognition of his contributions to maintaining the little town's rural character. The citation referred to his having contributed a number of artistic memorials. It was to Mittenwald that he returned when he retired in 1932. There is still a Professor Schreyögg Square ("Professor-Schreyögg-Platz") named after him in the pedestrian zone on the west side of the town.

== Notable family members ==
The artist Jörg Schreyögg was the youngest of Georg Schreyögg's three children by his marriage to Elisabeth von Barton.
