= Georg Anton Rollett =

Austrian naturalist and physician

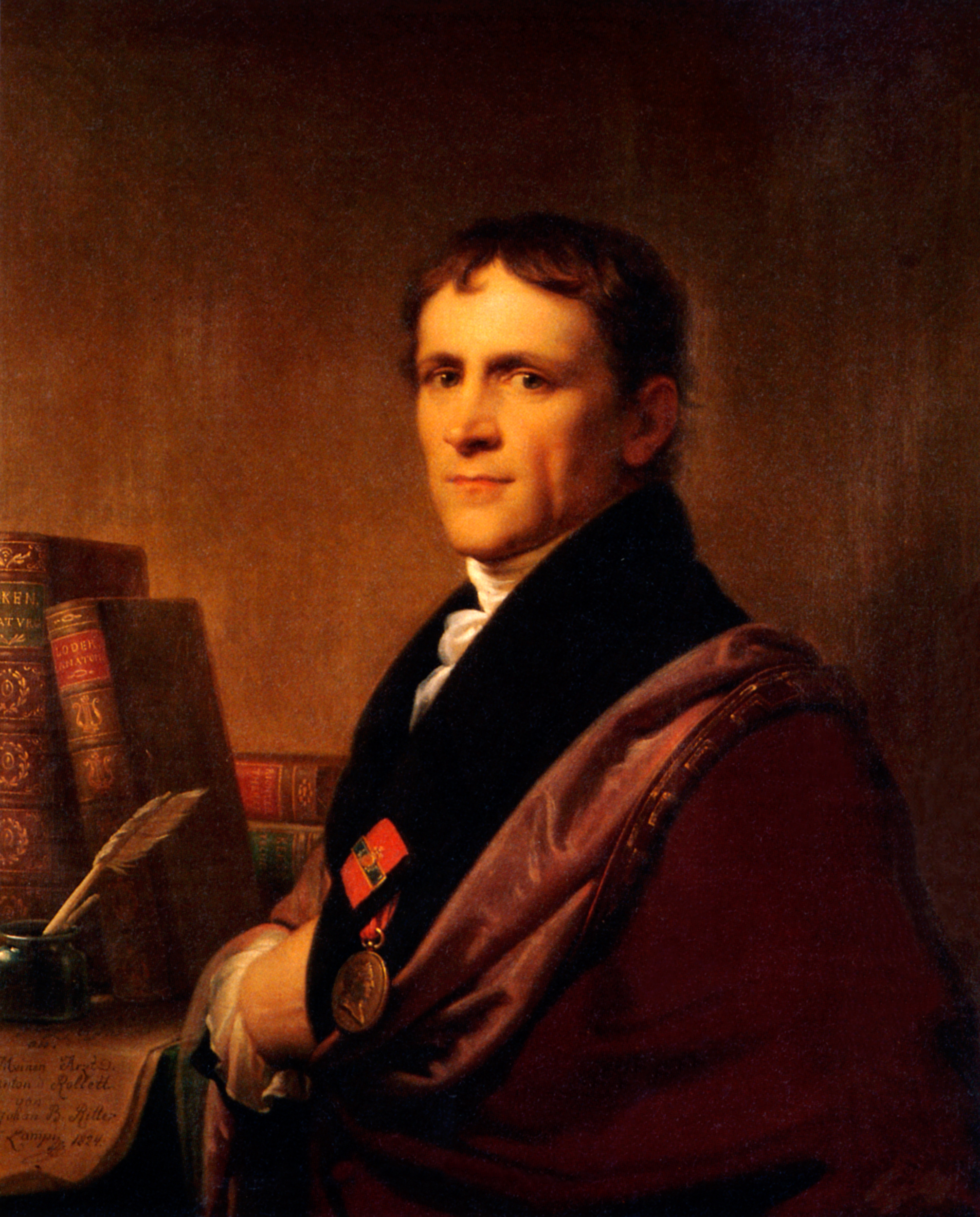
Georg Anton Rollett 1778-1842)

Georg Anton Rollett (2 August 1778 – 19 March 1842) was an Austrian naturalist and medical doctor born in Baden bei Wien, Niederösterreich. He was the father of poet Hermann Rollett (1819-1904).

In 1795 he began his medical studies at the Vienna General Hospital, and during the following years took exams in surgery, obstetrics and animal pharmacology. In 1799 he started practicing medicine in Piesting, two years later returning to Baden as a doctor.

During his career Rollett amassed an extensive scientific collection that he donated to the city of Baden. This collection includes a herbarium of over 14,000 plant species, plus archaeological, ethnographical, technological, mineralogical, botanical and zoological items as well as Franz Joseph Gall's phrenological collection of skulls and busts.

== Written works ==
- Kleine Flora und Fauna von Baden, 1805
- Schematismus der landesfürstlichen Stadt Baden in Niederösterreich, 1805.
