= Karl Holdhaus =

Austrian entomologist (1883–1975)

Karl Holdhaus (21 January 1883, in Baden bei Wien – 30 June 1975) was an Austrian entomologist who specialised in Coleoptera. He was Director of the Vienna Natural History Museum.

Holdhaus worked on the Coleoptera of glacial refugia, postglacial range expansions and “Massifs de Refugium”. He recognised that the distribution of blind euedaphic and troglobitic beetles was restricted to a well defined area in Europe, south of a line connecting Bordeaux, Lyon, the southern Alps, the Carpathians and the Black Sea. This is the “Holdhaus line” - the northern distribution limit of beetles with very poor powers of dispersal, especially blind cave beetles. Only two small areas with blind beetles occur north of this line, the Jura Mountains and the Northeastern Alps). Also South of this line there are many endemic animals and these areas are the “Massifs de Refugium” of Chodat & Pampanini (1902).

== Selected works ==
- 1920 Koleopteren aus Mesopotamien. Ann. Naturh. Mus. Wien, 33 (1919): 39-58.
- 1923 Elenco dei Coleotteri dell'isola d' Elba, con studii suI problemo della Tirennida. Mem. Soc. ent. ital., 2, 1: 76-112, 2: 113-176.
- with Carl. H. Lindroth, 1940. Die europäischen Koleopteren mit boreoalpiner Verbreitung. Ann. Nat. Mus. Wien 50: 123-293.
- 1954 Die Spuren der Eiszeit in der Tierwelt Europas. Abh. zool.-bot. Ges., 18: 1-493.

Also in book form as Die Spuren der Eiszeit in der Tierwelt Europas. 1-493. Wagner, Innsbruck.(same year)

- with Deubel F. 1910.Untersuchungen über die Zoogeographie der Karpathen (unter besonderer Berucksichtigung der Coleopteren). Abh. zool.-bot. Ges. Wien, 6, 1: 1-202.

== Collection ==
Holdhaus' collection is Vienna Natural History Museum.
