= Klotz (violin makers) =

Family of German violin makers

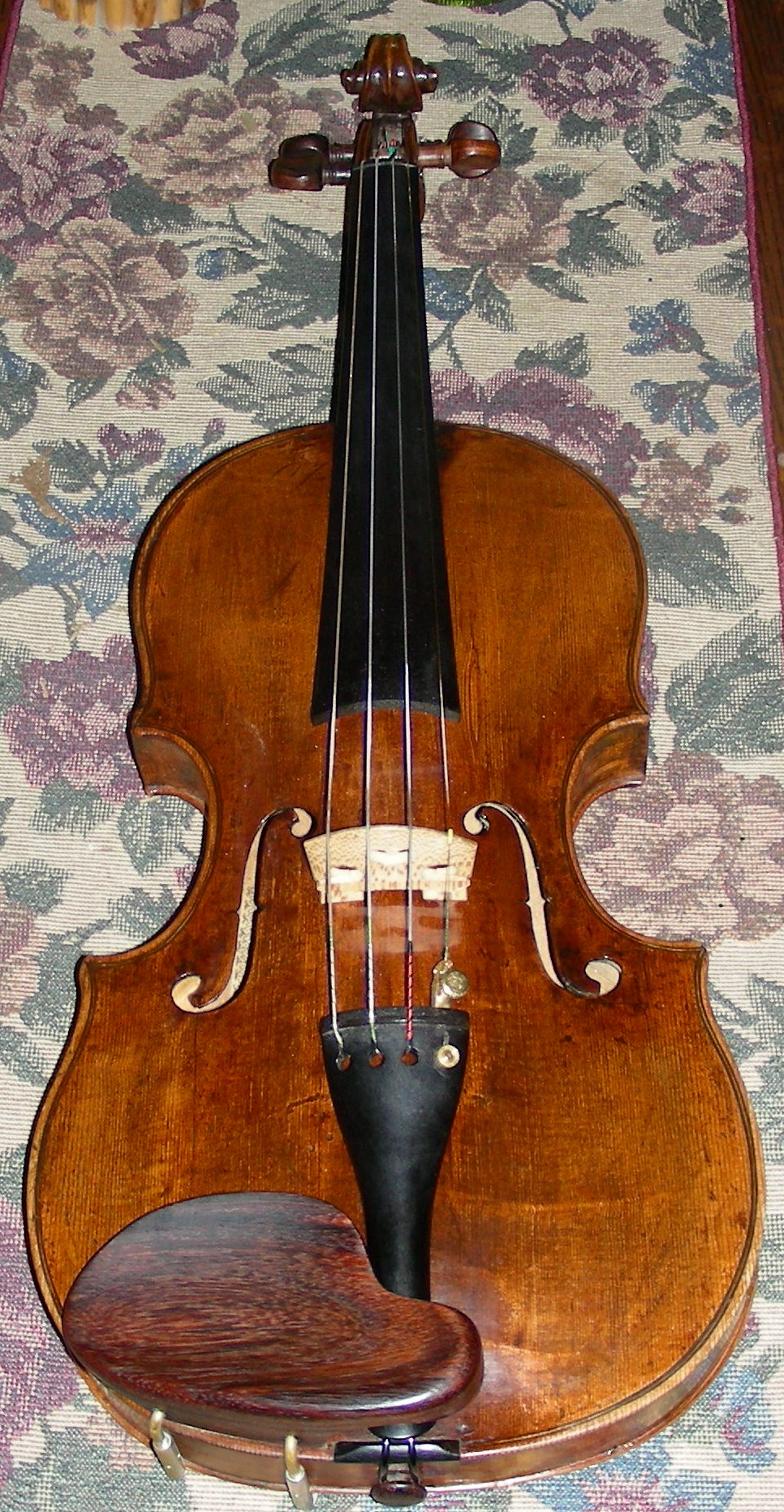
A violin made by Josef Klotz in Germany in 1794

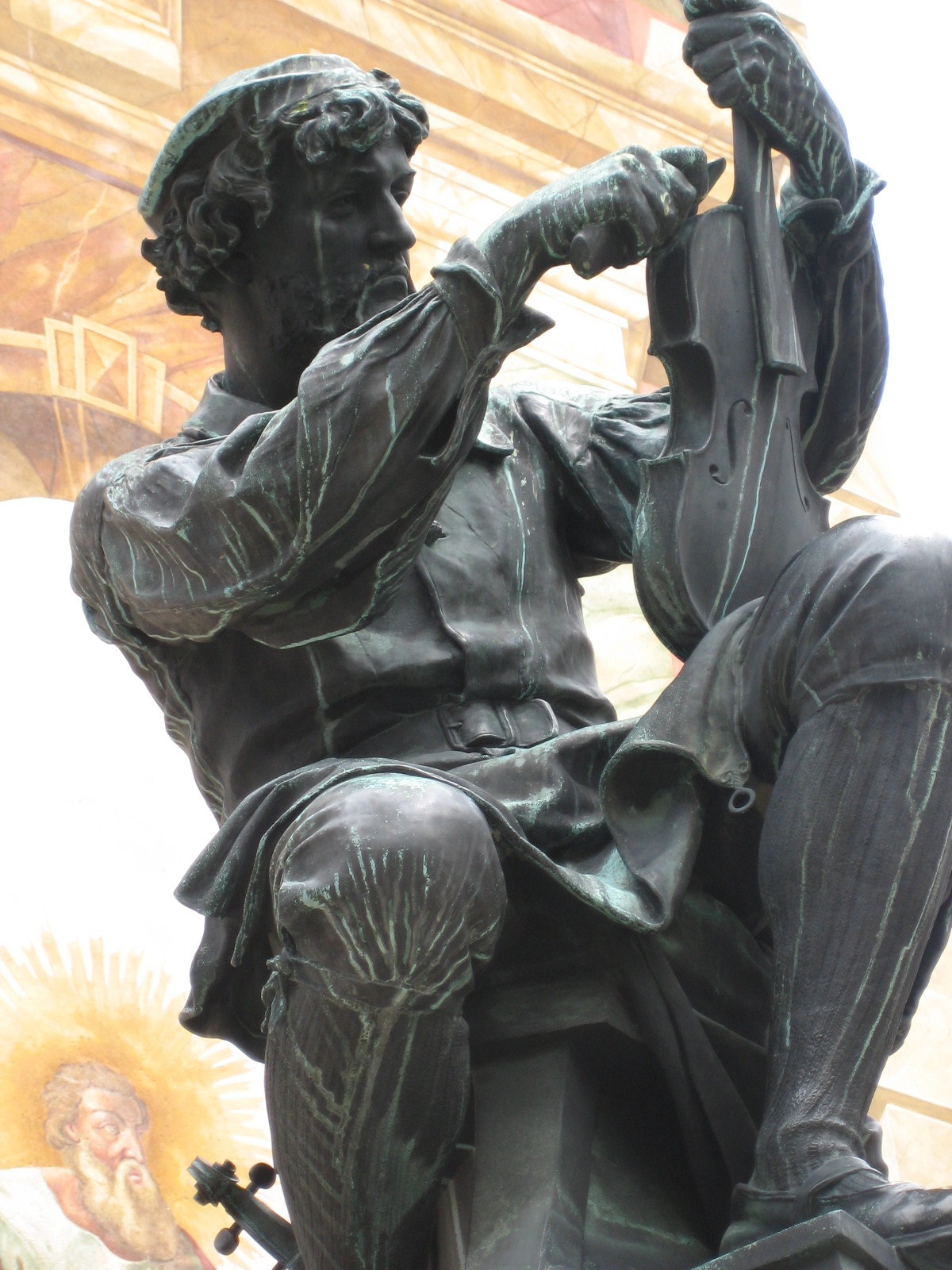
Matthias Klotz memorial in Mittenwald

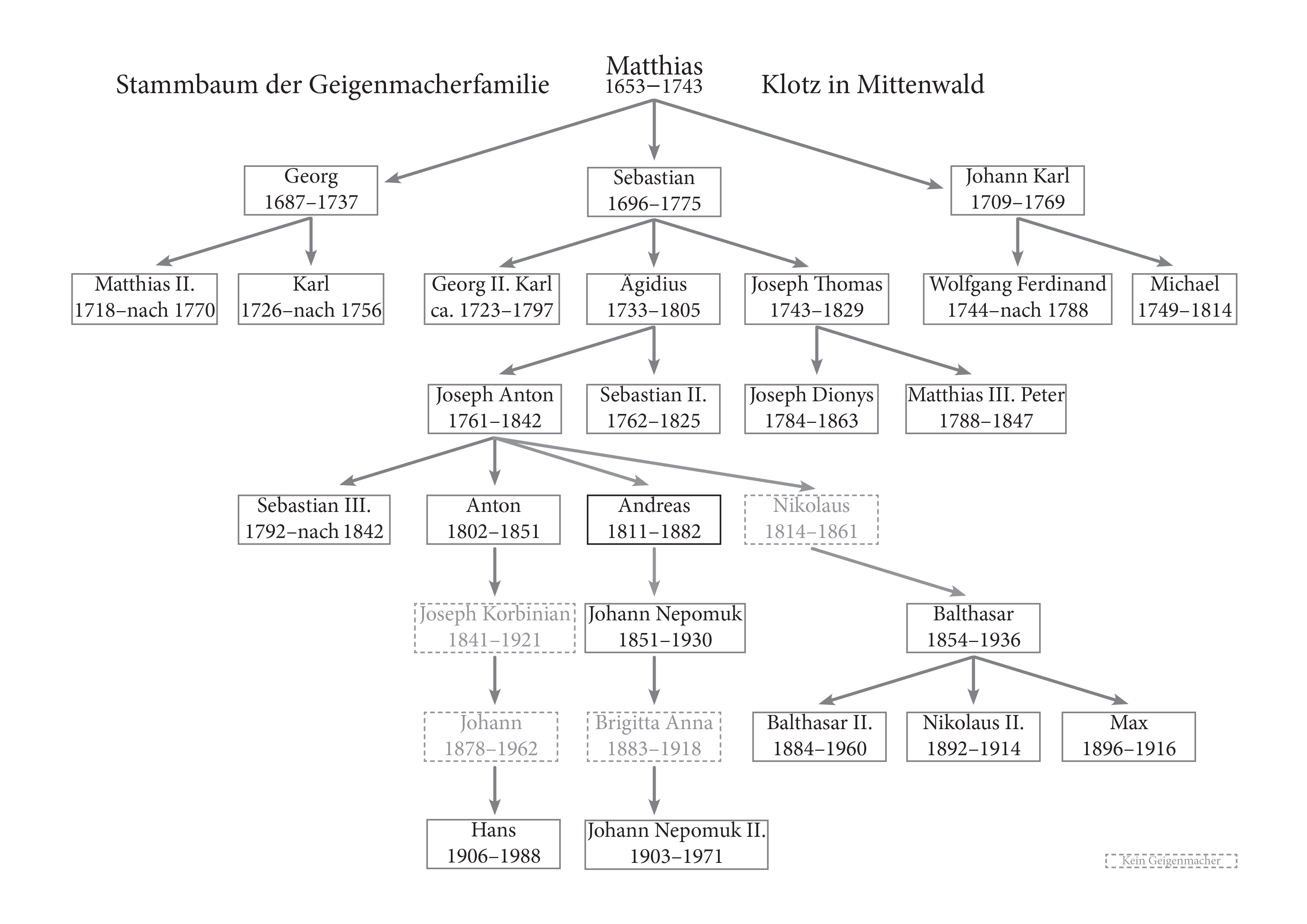
Family tree of the descendants of Matthias Klotz, showing which ones became violin makers

Klotz is a family of violin makers. Members of the Klotz (or Kloz) family have made violins in Mittenwald, Bavaria from the mid-17th century to the present. Matthias Klotz (1656–1743) founded the Mittenwald school of violin making. Mittenwald prospered and became well known for its violins.

In 1856, the Bavarian government founded a school in Mittenwald to continue the violin trade. Dictionaries of violin makers list more than 25 artisans by this name.

Typical labels:

- Mattias Klotz Geigenmacher zu Mittenwald an der Iser 1697
- Mathias Klotz Lauten und Geigenmacher in Mittenwald an der Iser Anno 1695
- Mathias Kloz Lautenmacher. A label of the family in Mittenwalt Anno 1725.

Instruments by Sebastian Klotz (1696–1768) are probably the most admired among the many existing examples by this family.

Typical labels:

- Sebastian Klotz in Mittenwald an der Iser 1734
- Sebastian Kloz, in Mittenwald, an 1743
- Seb. G. Kloz in Mittenwald, 1732
