= List of mountains of Bavaria =

This list of mountains in Bavaria shows a selection of high and/or well-known mountains in the German state of Bavaria.

== Highest mountains by province ==
In the following table, the highest mountain in each of the 7 Bavarian provinces is listed.

Highest mountain in each of the 7 Bavarian provinces
Heights given in metres (m) above sea level (NHN)

By clicking on the word "list" in the mountain list column you will be taken to the list of mountains in that region (sometimes including those lying outside of Bavaria). The table is initially sorted by height, but may be rearranged by clicking the symbols at the head of each column.

Highest mountain	Height (m)	Landscape	Mountain lists	Region
Zugspitze	2962	Wetterstein Mountains	List	Upper Bavaria
Hochfrottspitze	2649	Allgäu Alps	List	Swabia
Großer Arber	1455.5	Bavarian Forest	List	Lower Bavaria
Kleiner Arber	1383.6	Bavarian Forest	List	Upper Palatinate
Schneeberg	1051	Fichtel Mountains	List	Upper Franconia
Dammersfeldkuppe	927.9	Rhön	List	Lower Franconia
Hesselberg	689.4	Franconian Jura	List	Middle Franconia

== Highest mountains and hills of the regions of Bavaria ==
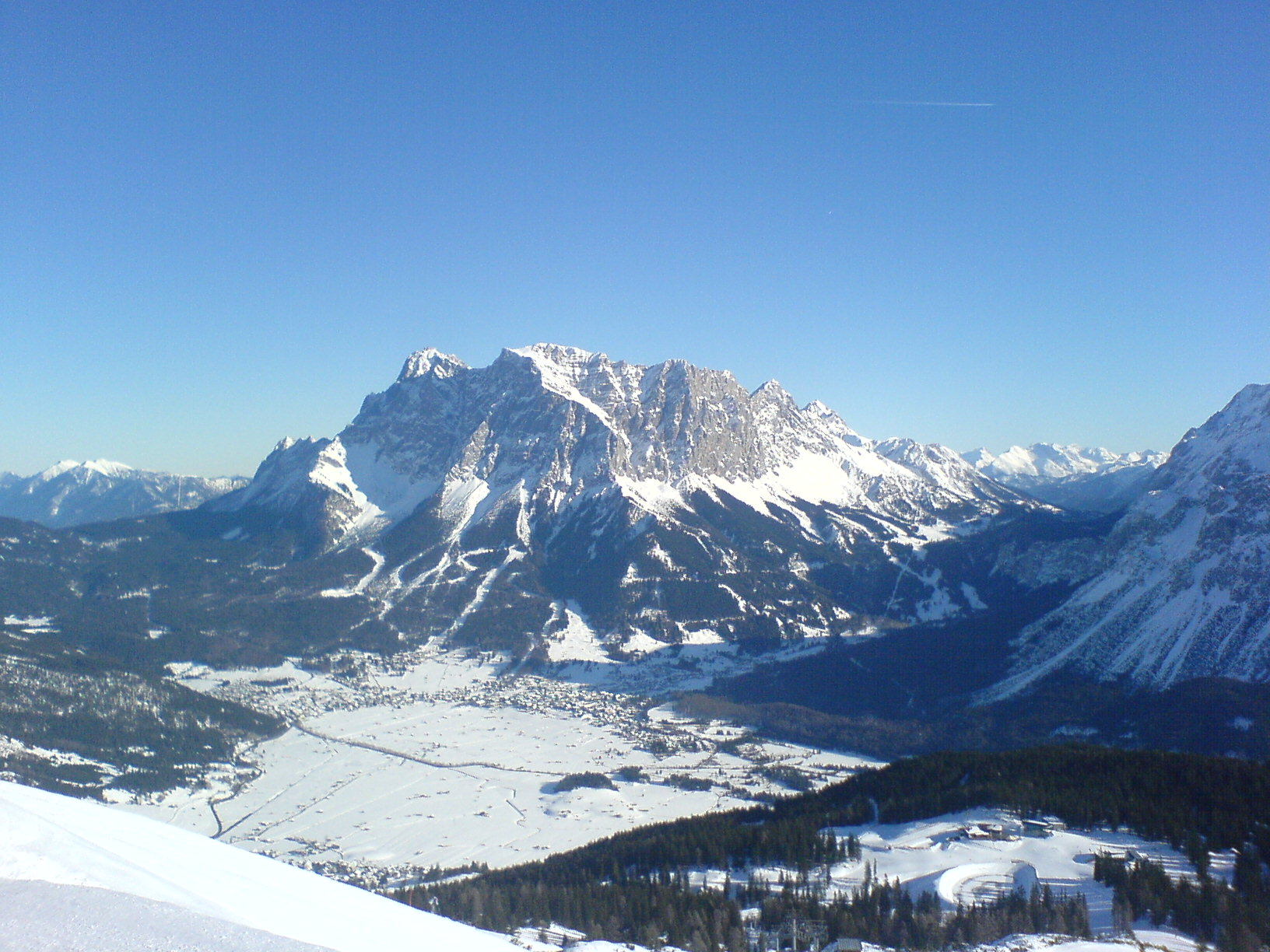
Zugspitze (Wetterstein Mountains)

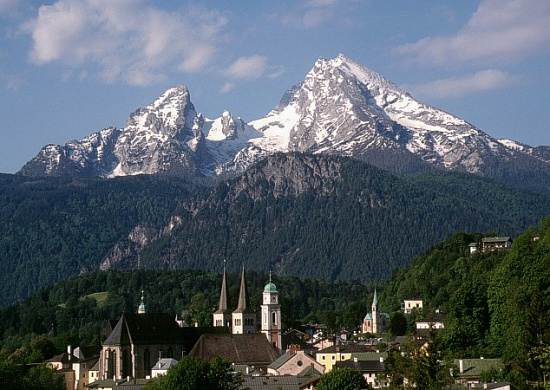
Watzmann (Berchtesgaden Alps)

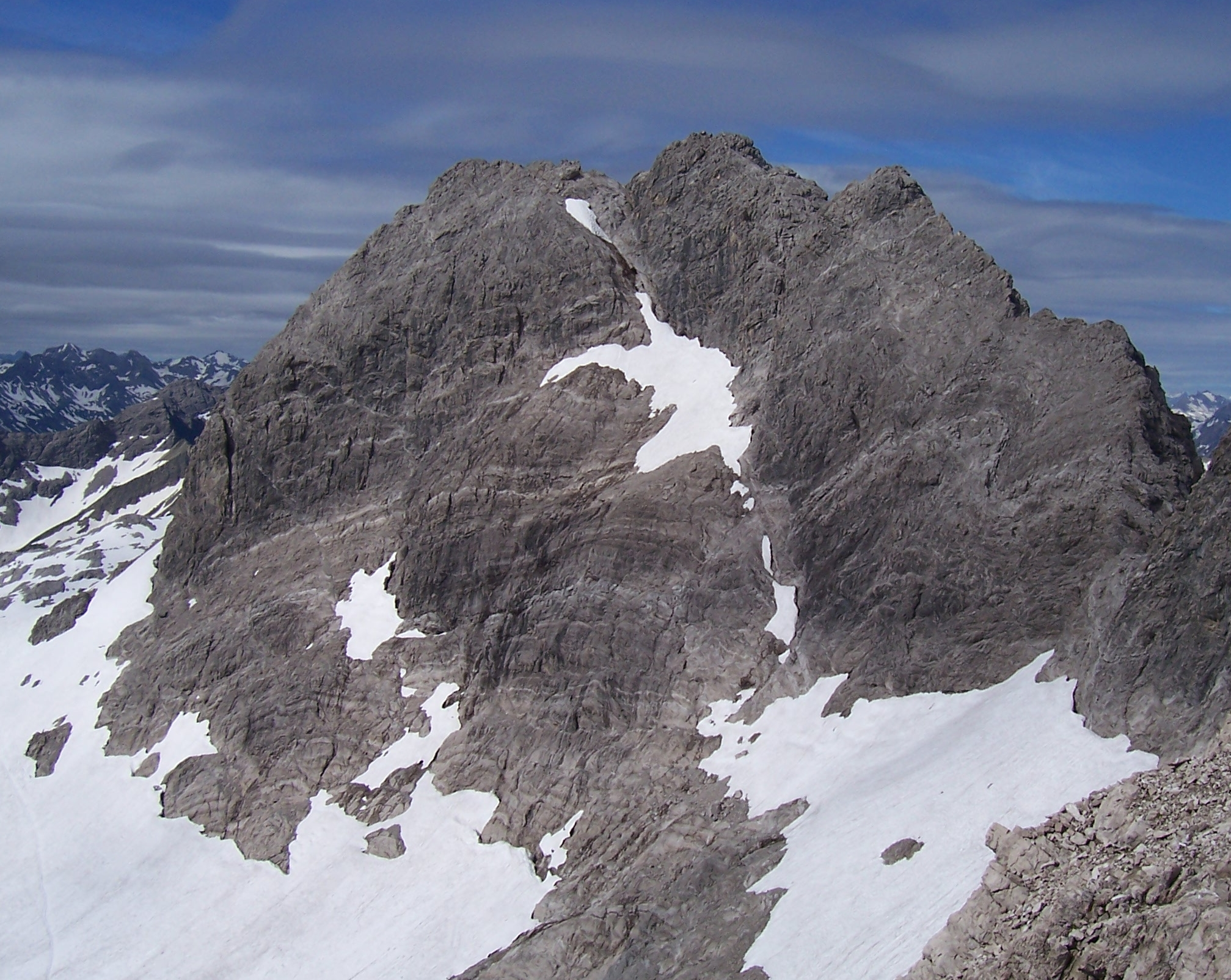
Hochfrottspitze (Allgäu Alps)

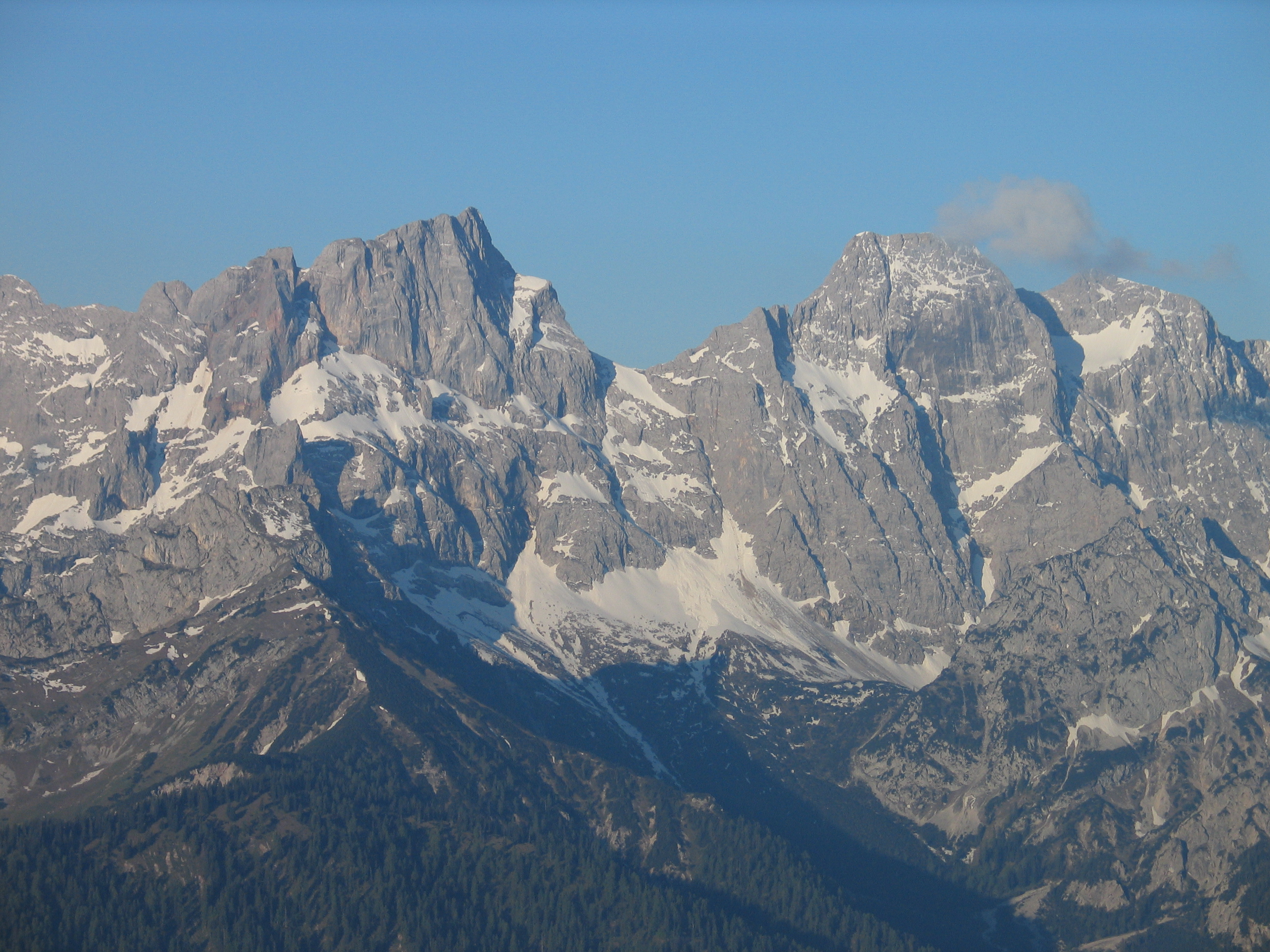
Eastern Karwendelspitze (links; Karwendel Mountains)

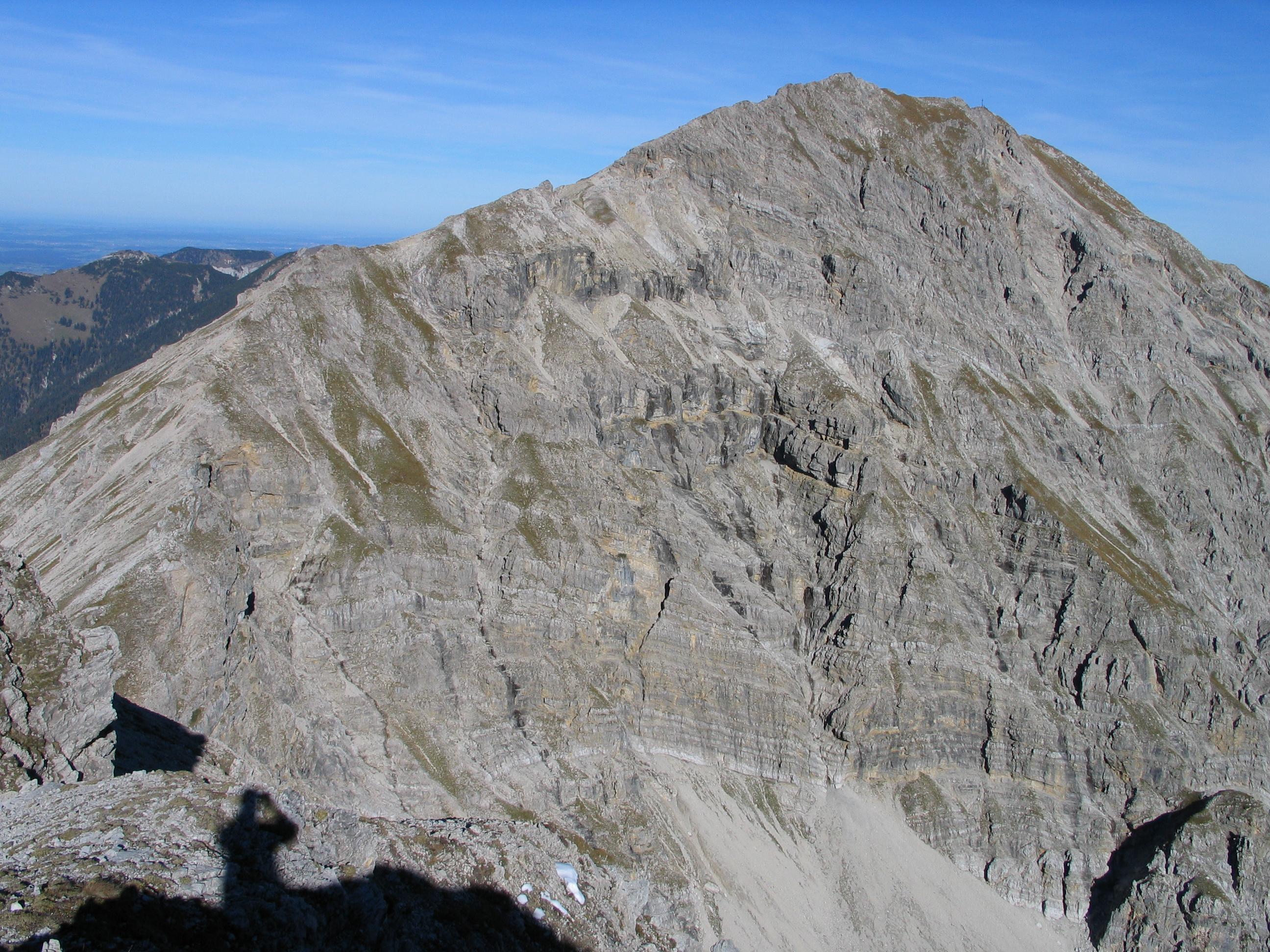
Kreuzspitze (Ammergau Alps)

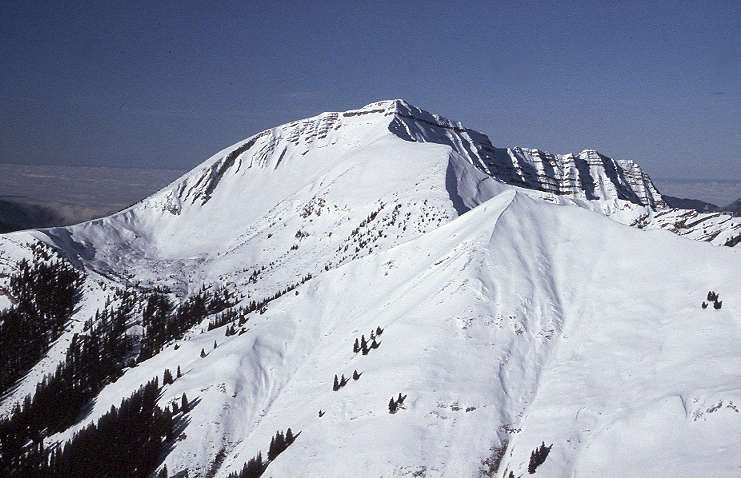
Schafreuter (Vorkarwendel)

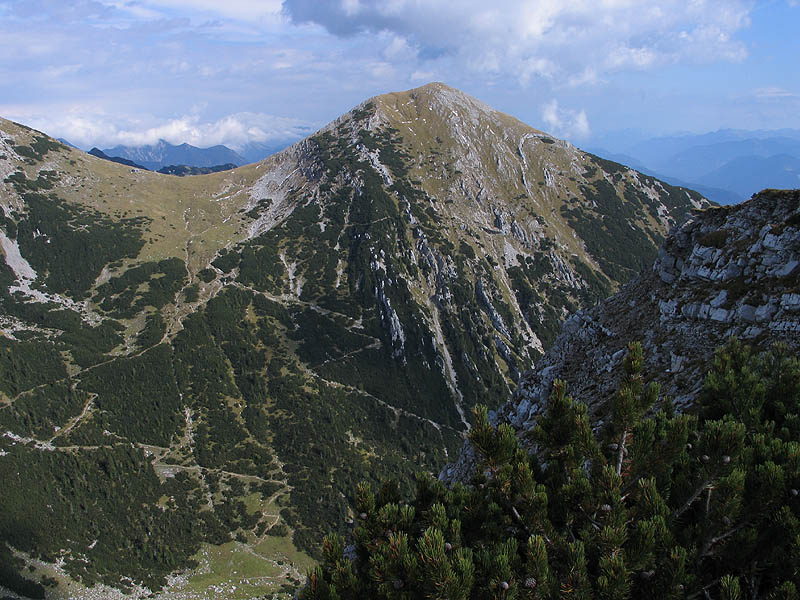
Krottenkopf (Ester Mountains)

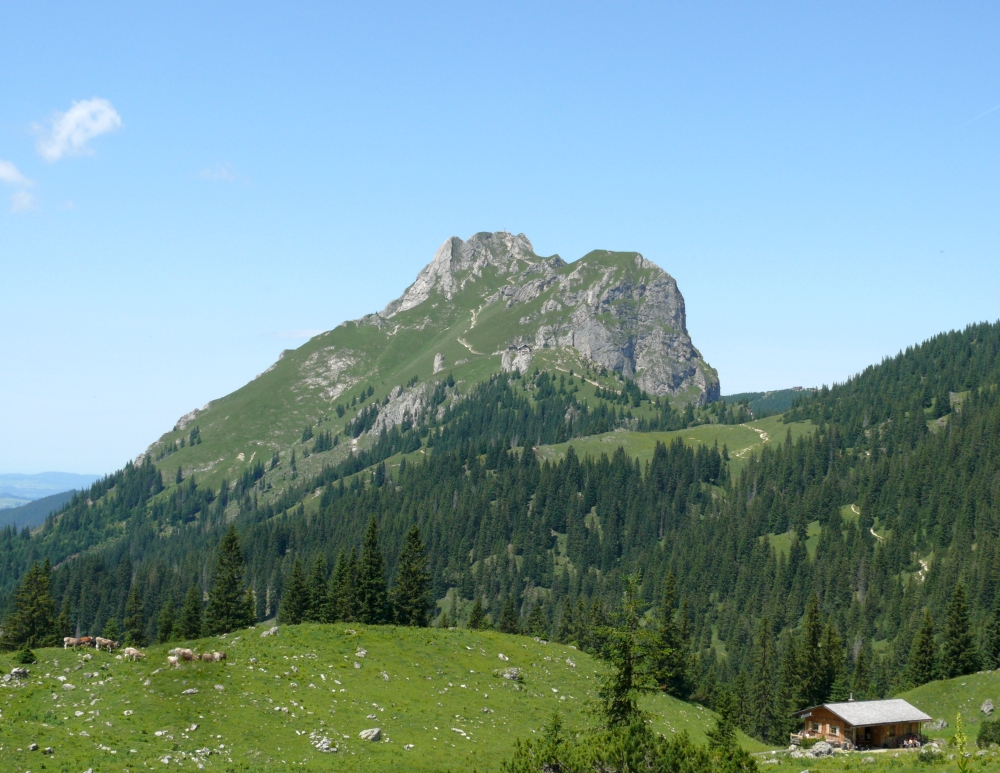
Aggenstein (Tannheim Mountains)

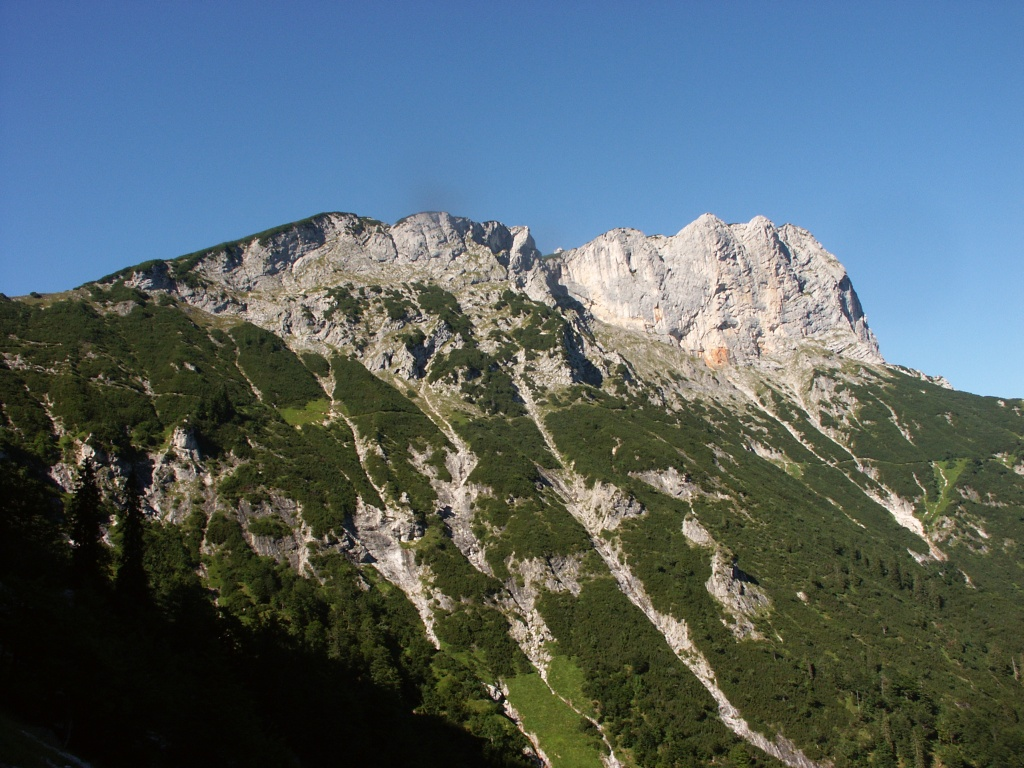
Berchtesgadener Hochthron (Untersberg)

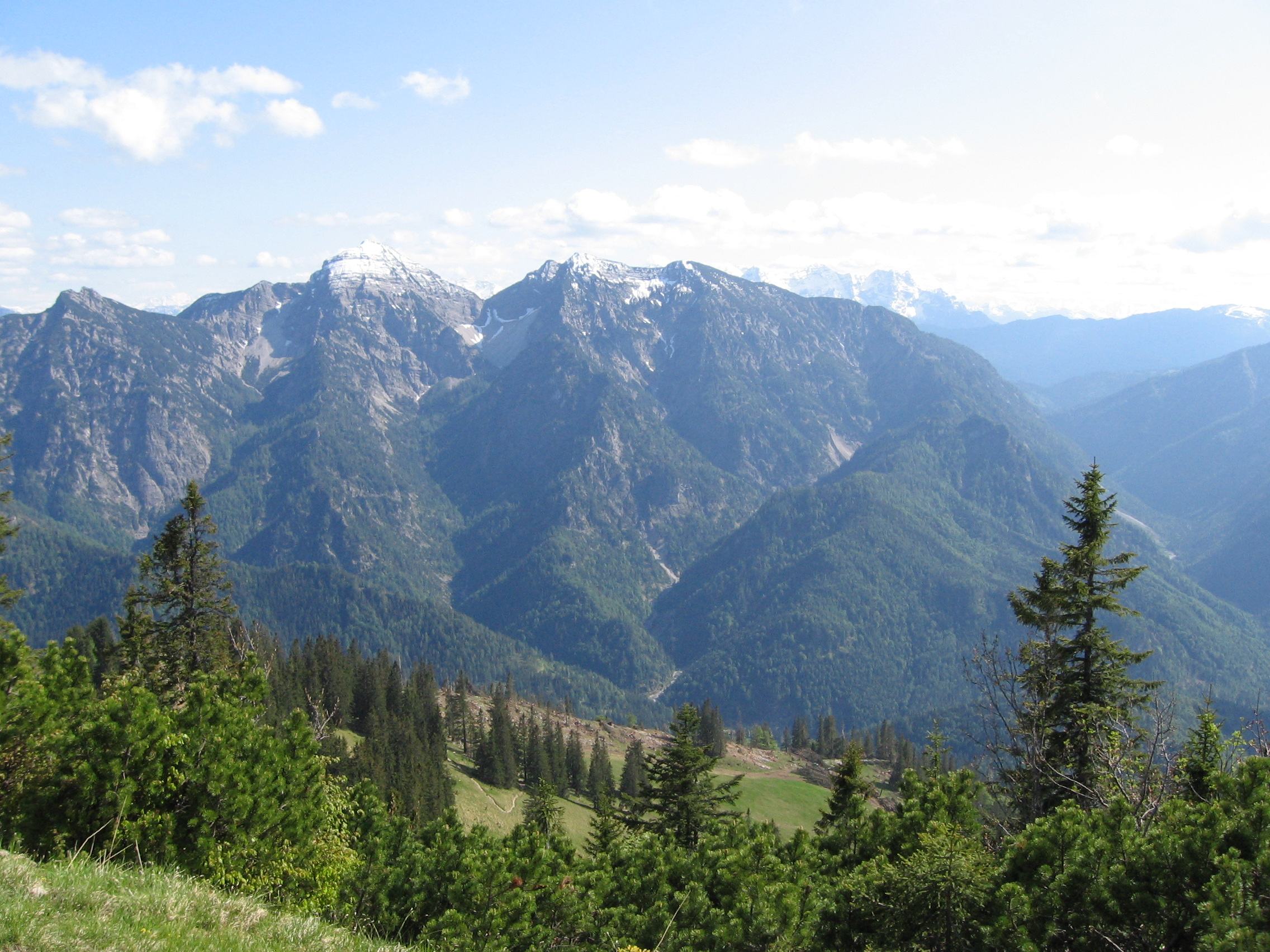
Sonntagshorn (Chiemgau Alps)

In the following table the highest mountain or hill in each of the regions of Bavaria is shown. A ‘region’ is taken to be a major natural region unit.

In the column Range/Region, high or extensive mountain ranges are shown in bold, lower or smaller hills and regions, which do not have a local high point or basin, but whose (island-like) high points have prominence are shown in italics. By clicking the word “list” in the mountain lists column, you will be taken to a list of other mountains or hills in the respective region (some of which may included those outside of Bavaria).

Multiple listings of the same mountain are possible because, e.g., the Zugspitze is simultaneously the highest (Bavarian) mountain of the Alps, Bavarian Alps, Northern Limestone Alps and the Wetterstein Mountains.

The table, which is initially sorted by height, may be rearranged by clicking on the symbols at the head of each column.

Mountain/Hill	Height (m)	Range/Region	Mountain list	County/Independent town or city (D) or district (A) (also states)
Zugspitze	2962	**Alps**	List	Garmisch-Partenkirchen (BY); Reutte (Tyrol)
Zugspitze	2962	**Bavarian Alps**; Part of the **Alps**	List; List	Garmisch-Partenkirchen (BY); Reutte (Tyrol)
Zugspitze	2962	**Northern Limestone Alps**; Part of the **Alps**	List; List	Garmisch-Partenkirchen (BY); Reutte (Tyrol)
Zugspitze	2962	**Wetterstein Mountains**; Part of the **Alps**	List; List	Garmisch-Partenkirchen (BY); Reutte (Tyrol)
Watzmann (Mittelspitze)	2713	**Berchtesgaden Alps**; Part of the **Alps**	List; List	Berchtesgadener Land
Hochfrottspitze	2649	**Allgäu Alps**; Part of the **Alps**	List; List	Oberallgäu (BY); Reutte (Tyrol)
Eastern Karwendelspitze	2538	**Karwendel Mountains**; Part of the **Alps**	List; List	Garmisch-Partenkirchen (BY); Innsbruck-Land, Schwaz (Tyrol)
Kreuzspitze	2185	**Ammergau Alps**; Part of the **Alps**	List; List	Garmisch-Partenkirchen
Schafreuter (Schafreiter)	2101,4	**Vorkarwendel**; Part of the **Alps**	– List	Bad Tölz-Wolfratshausen (BY); Schwaz (Tyrol)
Krottenkopf	2086	**Bavarian Prealps**; Part of the **Alps**	List; List	Garmisch-Partenkirchen
Krottenkopf	2086	**Ester Mountains**; Part of the **Alps**	List; List	Garmisch-Partenkirchen
Aggenstein	1987	**Tannheim Mountains**; Part of the **Alps**	List; List	Ostallgäu (BY); Reutte (Tyrol)
Berchtesgadener Hochthron	1973	**Untersberg**; Part of the **Alps**	List; List	Berchtesgadener Land
Sonntagshorn	1961	**Chiemgau Alps**; Part of the **Alps**	List; List	Traunstein (BY); Berchtesgadener Land (BY); Zell am See (Salzburg)
Rotwand	1884	**Mangfall Mountains**; Part of the **Alps**	List; List	Miesbach
Zwiesel	1781,6	Staufen; Part of the **Alps**	List; List	Berchtesgadener Land
Karkopf	1738	Lattengebirge; Part of the **Alps**	List; List	Berchtesgadener Land
Vogelsang	1563	Mangfall Mountains/Sudelfeld; Part of the **Alps**	List; List	Miesbach
Großer Arber	1455,5	**Bavarian Forest**	List	Regen
Einödriegel	1120,6	Lower Bavarian Forest; Part of the **Bavarian Forest**	List; List	Deggendorf
Raggenhorn	1056,2	Adelegg; Part of the **Alps**	List; List	Oberallgäu (BY); Ravensburg (BW)
Schneeberg	1051	**Fichtel Mountains**	List	Wunsiedel
Platte	946	**Steinwald**	List	Tirschenreuth
Kreuzfelsen	938	**Upper Palatine Forest**	List	Cham
Dammersfeldkuppe	927,9	**Rhön**	List	Bad Kissingen (BY); Fulda (HE)
Högl	827	Rupertiwinkel (Rupertigau)	List	Berchtesgadener Land
Döbraberg	794,6	**Franconian Forest**	List	Hof
Hesselberg	689,4	**Franconian Jura**	List	Ansbach
Dürrenberg	656,4	Hahnenkamm; Part of the **Franconian Jura**	List; List	Weißenburg-Gunzenhausen
Blankenstein	644	Riesalb; Part of the **Swabian Jura**	– List	Donau-Ries
Hohenstein	624	Hersbruck Jura (Hersbruck Switzerland); Part of the Franconian Jura	List List	Nürnberger Land
Hohe Reuth (Hohe Reut)	635	Franconian Switzerland	List	Bayreuth
Geiersberg (Breitsol)	586	**Spessart**	List	Aschaffenburg
Hornberg	554	**Frankenhöhe**	List	Ansbach
Der Kolli	547,5	**Odenwald**	List	Miltenberg (BY); Neckar-Odenwald (BW)
Hohe Schule	538	Grabfeld	List	Rhön-Grabfeld
Buchberg	528	Lange Berge	List	Coburg
Nassacher Höhe	512	**Haßberge**	List	Haßberge
Scheinberg	498,5	**Steigerwald**	List	Neustadt/Aisch-Bad Windsheim
Leitenberg	469	Abenberg Forest	–	Roth

== Mountains and hills of Bavaria ==
The following section contains a selection of Bavarian mountains and hills in the seven provinces, sorted alphabetically, in each case in order of descending height:

Name, Height in metres above sea level, Location (District/Region)

== Upper Bavaria ==
- Zugspitze (2,962 m), Garmisch-Partenkirchen district, Wetterstein mountains, Alps
- Schneefernerkopf (2,875 m), Garmisch-Partenkirchen district, Wetterstein mountains, Alps
- Wetterspitzen (2,747 m), Garmisch-Partenkirchen district, Wetterstein mountains, Alps
- Hochwanner (2,746 m), Garmisch-Partenkirchen district, Wetterstein mountains, Alps
- Mittlere Höllentalspitze (2,743 m), Garmisch-Partenkirchen district, Wetterstein mountains, Alps
- Watzmann-Mittelspitze (2,713 m), Berchtesgadener Land, Berchtesgaden Alps, Alps
- Watzmann-Südspitze (2,712 m), Berchtesgadener Land, Berchtesgaden Alps
- Hochblassen (2,707 m), Garmisch-Partenkirchen district, Wetterstein mountains, Alps
- Leutascher Dreitorspitze (2,682 m), Garmisch-Partenkirchen district, Wetterstein mountains, Alps
- Plattspitzen (2,680 m), Garmisch-Partenkirchen district, Wetterstein mountains, Alps
- Hinterreintalschrofen (2,669 m), Garmisch-Partenkirchen district, Wetterstein mountains, Alps
- Hocheck (2,651 m), Berchtesgadener Land, Berchtesgaden Alps
- Alpspitze (2,628 m), Garmisch-Partenkirchen district, Wetterstein mountains, Alps
- Hochkalter (2,607 m), Berchtesgadener Land, Berchtesgaden Alps
- Großer Hundstod (2,593 m), Berchtesgadener Land, Berchtesgaden Alps
- Funtenseetauern (2,578 m), Berchtesgadener Land, Berchtesgaden Alps
- Grießkogel (2,543 m), Berchtesgadener Land, Berchtesgaden Alps
- Östliche Karwendelspitze (2,538 m), Garmisch-Partenkirchen district, Karwendel mountains, Alps
- Hocheisspitze (2,523 m), Berchtesgadener Land, Berchtesgaden Alps
- Oberreintalschrofen (2,523 m), Garmisch-Partenkirchen district, Wetterstein mountains, Alps
- Hoher Göll (2,522 m), Berchtesgadener Land, Berchtesgaden Alps
- Hochkarspitze (2,484 m), Garmisch-Partenkirchen district, Karwendel mountains, Alps
- Wettersteinkopf (2,483 m), Garmisch-Partenkirchen district, Wetterstein mountains
- Wörner (Alps) (2,476 m), Garmisch-Partenkirchen district, Karwendel mountains, Alps
- Steintalhörnl (2,468 m), Berchtesgadener Land, Berchtesgaden Alps
- Westliche Karwendelspitze (2,385 m), Garmisch-Partenkirchen district, Karwendel mountains, Alps
- Großes Teufelshorn (2,361 m), Berchtesgadener Land, Berchtesgaden Alps
- Alpriedlhorn (2,351 m), Berchtesgadener Land, Berchtesgaden Alps
- Kahlersberg (2,350 m), Berchtesgadener Land, Berchtesgaden Alps
- Hohes Brett (2,340 m), Berchtesgadener Land, Berchtesgaden Alps
- Schneiber (2,330 m), Berchtesgadener Land, Berchtesgaden Alps
- Raffelspitze (2,324 m), Garmisch-Partenkirchen district, Karwendel mountains, Alps
- Watzmannfrau (2,307 m; Kleiner Watzmann), Berchtesgadener Land district, Berchtesgaden Alps
- Stadelhorn (2,286 m), Berchtesgadener Land, Berchtesgaden Alps
- Obere Wettersteinspitze (2,280 m), Garmisch-Partenkirchen district, Wetterstein mountains, Alps
- Waxenstein (2,276 m), Garmisch-Partenkirchen district, Wetterstein mountains, Alps
- Watzmannkinder (to 2,270 m; five peaks), Berchtesgadener Land, Berchtesgaden Alps
- Wildalmriedl (2,268 m), Berchtesgadener Land, Berchtesgaden Alps
- Schneibstein (2,276 m), Berchtesgadener Land, Berchtesgaden Alps
- Soiernspitze (2,259 m), Garmisch-Partenkirchen district, Karwendel mountains, Alps
- Grießspitze (2,257 m), Berchtesgadener Land, Berchtesgaden Alps
- Alpelhorn (2,254 m), Berchtesgadener Land, Berchtesgaden Alps
- Watzmann-Jungfrau (2,225 m), Berchtesgadener Land, Berchtesgaden Alps
- Großes Palfenhorn (2,222 m), Berchtesgadener Land, Berchtesgaden Alps
- Windschartenkopf (2,211 m), Berchtesgadener Land, Berchtesgaden Alps
- Große Arnspitze (2,196 m), Garmisch-Partenkirchen district, Wetterstein mountains, Alps
- Karlkopf (2,195 m), Berchtesgadener Land, Berchtesgaden Alps
- Kreuzspitze (2,185 m), Garmisch-Partenkirchen district, Ammergau Alps
- Rotwandlspitze (2,180 m), Garmisch-Partenkirchen district, Karwendel mountains, Alps
- Hirschwiese (2,114 m), Berchtesgadener Land, Berchtesgaden Alps
- Schafreuter (2,102 m), Bad Tölz-Wolfratshausen, Karwendel mountains, Alps
- Krottenkopf (2,086 m), Garmisch-Partenkirchen district, Ester Mountains, Alps
- Große Hachelkopf (2,066 m), Berchtesgadener Land, Berchtesgaden Alps
- Hachelköpfe (2,066 m), Berchtesgadener Land, Berchtesgaden Alps
- Schöttelkarspitze (2,049 m), Garmisch-Partenkirchen district, Karwendel mountains, Alps
- Schottmalhorn (Reiter Alm) (2,045 m), Berchtesgadener Land, Berchtesgaden Alps
- Sonntagshorn (1,961 m), Berchtesgadener Land, Chiemgau Alps
- Falzköpfl (1,915 m), Berchtesgadener Land, Berchtesgaden Alps
- Berchtesgadener Hochthron (1,973 m), Berchtesgadener Land, Untersberg
- Rotwand (1,884 m), Miesbach district, Mangfall Mountains, Alps
- Großer Traithen (1,852 m), Rosenheim district, Mangfall Mountains, Alps
- Wendelstein (1,838 m), Rosenheim district, Mangfall Mountains, Alps
- Kehlstein (1,834 m), Berchtesgadener Land, Berchtesgaden Alps
- Risserkogel (1,826 m), Miesbach district, Mangfall Mountains, Alps
- Mooslahnerkopf (1,815 m), Berchtesgadener Land district, Berchtesgaden Alps
- Geigelstein (1,813 m), Traunstein district, Chiemgau Alps
- Ruchenköpfe (1,805 m), Miesbach district, Mangfall Mountains, Alps
- Benediktenwand (1,801 m), Bad Tölz-Wolfratshausen, Bavarian Prealps
- Heimgarten (1,790 m), Bad Tölz-Wolfratshausen, Bavarian Prealps
- Zwiesel (mountain) (1,782 m), Berchtesgadener Land, Chiemgau Alps
- Dürrnbachhorn (1,776 m), Traunstein district, Chiemgau Alps
- Kotzen (1,776 m), Vorkarwendel
- Hochstaufen (1,771 m), Berchtesgadener Land, Chiemgau Alps
- Plankenstein (mountain) (1,768 m), Miesbach district, Mangfall Mountains, Alps
- Hochgern (1,748 m), Traunstein district, Chiemgau Alps
- Karkopf (1,738 m), Berchtesgadener Land, Lattengebirge
- Herzogstand (1,731 m), Bad Tölz-Wolfratshausen, Bavarian Prealps
- Roß- und Buchstein (1,698 m and 1,701 m), Bavarian Prealps
- Hörndlwand (1,684 m), Traunstein district, Chiemgau Alps
- Brecherspitz (1,683 m), Miesbach district, Mangfall Mountains, Alps
- Dreisesselberg (1,680 m), Berchtesgadener Land, Latten Mountains
- Hochfelln (1,674 m), Traunstein district, Chiemgau Alps
- Kampenwand (1,669 m), Rosenheim district, Chiemgau Alps
- Bodenschneid (1,668 m), Miesbach district, Schliersee Mountains, Bavarian Prealps
- Brünnstein (1,619 m), Rosenheim district, Mangfall Mountains, Alps
- Predigtstuhl (1,613 m), Berchtesgadener Land district, Lattengebirge
- Rinnerspitz (1,611 m), Miesbach district, Schliersee Mountains, Bavarian Pre-alps
- Roßkopf (1,580 m), Miesbach district, Schliersee Mountains, Bavarian Prealps
- Jochköpfl (1,575 m), Berchtesgadener Land, Latten Mountains
- Brauneck (1,555 m), Bad Tölz-Wolfratshausen, Bavarian Prealps
- Aufacker (1,542 m), Garmisch-Partenkirchen district, Ammergebirge
- Teisenberg (1,334 m), Berchtesgadener Land, Rupertigau
- Grünstein (Watzmann) (1,304 m), Berchtesgadener Land, Berchtesgaden Alps, Watzmannstock
- Zinnkopf (1,227 m), Traunstein district, Chiemgau Alps
- Heiglkopf (1,205 m), Bad Tölz-Wolfratshausen district, Bavarian Prealps
- Dötzenkopf (1,001 m), Berchtesgadener Land, Berchtesgaden Alps
- Hoher Peißenberg (987 m), Weilheim-Schongau district, Ammergebirge
- Högl (827 m), Berchtesgadener Land, Högl

== Swabia ==
- Hochfrottspitze (2,649 m), Oberallgäu district, Allgäu Alps, Alps
- Mädelegabel (2,645 m), Oberallgäu district, Allgäu Alps
- Biberkopf (2,599 m), Oberallgäu district, Allgäu Alps
- Trettachspitze (2,595 m), Oberallgäu district, Allgäu Alps
- Hochvogel (2,593 m), Oberallgäu district, Allgäu Alps
- Kratzer (2,428 m), Oberallgäu district, Allgäu Alps
- Großer Wilder (2,381 m), Oberallgäu district, Allgäu Alps
- Großer Daumen (2,280 m), Oberallgäu district, Allgäu Alps
- Hammerspitze (2,260 m), Oberallgäu district, Allgäu Alps
- Hoher Ifen (2,230 m), Oberallgäu district, Allgäu Alps
- Nebelhorn (2,224 m), Oberallgäu district, Allgäu Alps
- Hochplatte (2,082 m), Ostallgäu district, Ammergau Alps
- Warmatsgundkopf (bzw. Kanzelwand) (2,059 m), Oberallgäu district, Allgäu Alps
- Säuling (2,047 m), Ostallgäu district, Ammergau Alps
- Fellhorn (2,038 m), Oberallgäu district, Allgäu Alps
- Aggenstein (1,987 m), Oberallgäu district, Tannheimer mountains, Alps
- Grünten (1,738 m), Oberallgäu district, Allgäu Alps
- Tegelberg (1,720 m), Ostallgäu district, Ammergau Alps

== Lower Bavaria ==
- Großer Arber (1,456 m), Regen district, Bavarian Forest
- Großer Rachel (1,453 m), Freyung-Grafenau district, Bavarian Forest
- Kleiner Rachel (1,399 m), Freyung-Grafenau district, Bavarian Forest
- Plattenhausenriegel (1,376 m), Freyung-Grafenau district, Bavarian Forest
- Lusen (1,373 m), Freyung-Grafenau district, Bavarian Forest
- Bayerischer Plöckenstein (1,363 m), Freyung-Grafenau district, junction of Germany-Austria-Czech Republic, Bavarian Forest
- Lackenberg (1,337 m), Regen district, Bavarian Forest on the border of the Czech Republic
- Dreisesselberg (1,333 m), Freyung-Grafenau district, Bavarian Forest
- Großer Falkenstein (1,312 m), Regen district, Bavarian Forest
- Steinfleckberg (1,283 m), Freyung-Grafenau district, Bavarian Forest
- Rukowitzberg (1,269 m), Regen district, Bavarian Forest
- Kiesruck (1,265 m), Regen district, Bavarian Forest
- Siebensteinkopf (1,263 m), Freyung-Grafenau district, Bavarian Forest
- Hahnenbogen (1,257 m), Regen district, Bavarian Forest
- Hohlstein (1,196 m), Freyung-Grafenau district, Bavarian Forest
- Kleiner Falkenstein (1,190 m), Regen district, Bavarian Forest
- Hochzellberg (1,182 m), Regen district, Bavarian Forest
- Haidel (1,167 m), Freyung-Grafenau district, Bavarian Forest
- Waldhäuserriegel (1,151 m), Landkreis Freyung Grafenau, Bavarian Forest
- Sulzberg (1,146 m), Freyung-Grafenau district, Bavarian Forest
- Almberg (1,139 m), Freyung-Grafenau district, Bavarian Forest
- Großer Riedelstein (1,132 m), on the border between Regen district and Cham district, Bavarian Forest
- Steinkopf (Spiegelau) (1,131 m), Freyung-Grafenau district, Bavarian Forest
- Reischfleck (1,126 m), Regen district, Bavarian Forest
- Einödriegel (1,121 m), Deggendorf district, Bavarian Forest
- Breitenauriegel (1,114 m), Deggendorf district, Bavarian Forest
- Alzenberg (1,100 m), Freyung-Grafenau district, Bavarian Forest
- Geißkopf (1,097 m), Regen district, Bavarian Forest
- Hirschenstein (1,095 m), Straubing-Bogen district, Bavarian Forest
- Dreitannenriegel (1,092 m), Deggendorf district, Bavarian Forest
- Mühlriegel (1,080 m), Regen district, Bavarian Forest
- Schwarzkopf (1,060 m), Freyung-Grafenau district, Bavarian Forest
- Knogl (1,056 m), Straubing-Bogen district, Bavarian Forest
- Ödriegel (1,056 m), Regen district, Bavarian Forest
- Kälberbuckel (1,054 m), Straubing-Bogen district, Bavarian Forest
- Steinkopf (Mauth) (1,052), Freyung-Grafenau district, Bavarian Forest
- Rauher Kulm (1,050 m), Deggendorf district, Bavarian Forest
- Klausenstein (Bavaria) (1,048 m), Deggendorf district, Bavarian Forest
- Pröller (1,048 m), Straubing-Bogen district, Bayrischer Wald
- Hirschberg (1,039 m), Regen district, Bavarian Forest
- Rollmannsberg (1,042 m), Freyung-Grafenau district, Bavarian Forest
- Lichtenberg (1,028 m), Freyung-Grafenau district, Bavarian Forest
- Hochberg (1,025 m), Straubing-Bogen district, Bavarian Forest
- Predigtstuhl (1,024 m), Straubing-Bogen district, Bavarian Forest
- Vogelsang (1,022 m), Deggendorf district, Bavarian Forest
- Oberbreitenau (1,017 m), Deggendorf district, Bavarian Forest
- Brotjacklriegel (1,016 m), Freyung-Grafenau district, Bavarian Forest
- Schareben (1,015 m), Regen district, Bavarian Forest
- Kanzel (1,011 m), Freyung-Grafenau district, Bavarian Forest
- Käsplatte (979 m), Straubing-Bogen district, Bavarian Forest
- Hennenkobel (965 m), Regen district, Bavarian Forest
- Silberberg (955 m), Regen district, Bavarian Forest
- Gsengetstein (951 m), Regen district, Bavarian Forest
- Hausstein (917 m), Deggendorf district, Bavarian Forest
- Teufelstisch (901 m), Regen district, Bavarian Forest
- Büchelstein (832 m), Deggendorf district, Bavarian Forest

== Upper Palatinate ==
- Kleiner Arber (1,384 m), Cham district, Bavarian Forest
- Zwercheck (1,333 m), Cham district, Bavarian Forest
- Großer Osser (1,293 m), Cham district, Bavarian Forest
- Enzian (1,285 m), Cham district, Bavarian Forest
- Kleiner Osser (1,266 m), Cham district, Bavarian Forest
- Heugstatt (1,261 m), Cham district, Bavarian Forest
- Schwarzeck (1,238 m), Cham district, Bavarian Forest
- Großer Riedelstein (1,132 m), on the border between Regen district and Cham district, Bavarian Forest
- Hoher Bogen (1,079 m), Cham district, Bavarian Forest
- Schwarzriegel (1,079 m), Cham district, Bavarian Forest
- Eckstein (1,073 m), Cham district, Bavarian Forest
- Hindenburgkanzel (1,049 m), Cham district, Bavarian Forest
- Rauchröhren (1,044 m), Cham district, Bavarian Forest
- Mittagstein (1,034 m), Cham district, Bavarian Forest
- Kreuzfelsen (999 m), Cham district, Bavarian Forest
- Burgstall (976 m), Cham district, Bavarian Forest
- Platte (946 m), Tirschenreuth district, Fichtel Mountains
- Entenbühl (901 m), Neustadt an der Waldnaab district, Upper Palatine Forest
- Weingartenfels (896 m), Schwandorf district, Upper Palatine Forest
- Signalberg (Upper Palatine Forest) (888 m), Schwandorf district, Upper Palatine Forest
- Reichenstein (874 m), Schwandorf district, Upper Palatine Forest
- Frauenstein (835 m), Schwandorf district, Upper Palatine Forest
- Schellenberg (829 m), Neustadt/WN district, Upper Palatine Forest
- Stückstein (808 m), Neustadt/WN district, Upper Palatine Forest
- Steinberg (802 m), Tirschenreuth district, Upper Palatine Forest
- Fahrenberg (801 m), Neustadt/WN district, Upper Palatine Forest
- Armesberg (731 m), Tirschenreuth district, Fichtel Mountains
- Rauher Kulm (682 m), Neustadt/WN district, Upper Palatine Forest
- Poppberg (652 m), Amberg-Sulzbach district, Franconian Jura
- Waldecker Schloßberg (641 m), Tirschenreuth district, Upper Palatine Forest
- Göschberg (621 m), Neumarkt in der Oberpfalz district, Franconian Jura
- Buchberg (607 m), Neumarkt in der Oberpfalz district, Franconian Jura
- Schauerberg (601 m), Neumarkt in der Oberpfalz district, Franconian Jura
- Dillberg (595 m), Neumarkt in der Oberpfalz district, Franconian Jura
- Parkstein (595 m), Neustadt/WN district, Upper Palatine Forest
- Anzenstein (593 m), Tirschenreuth district, Upper Palatine Forest
- Kastelstein (591 m), Neumarkt in der Oberpfalz district, Franconian Jura
- Wolfstein (580 m), Neumarkt in der Oberpfalz district, Franconian Jura

== Upper Franconia ==
- Schneeberg (1,051 m), Wunsiedel im Fichtelgebirge district, Fichtel Mountains
- Ochsenkopf (1,024 m), Bayreuth district, Fichtel Mountains
- Nußhardt (972 m), Wunsiedel district, Fichtel Mountains
- Kösseine (939 m), Wunsiedel district, Fichtel Mountains
- Waldstein (877 m), Hof district, Fichtel Mountains
- Hohberg (863 m; Königsheide), Bayreuth district, Fichtel Mountains
- Kulm (853), Bayreuth district, Fichtel Mountains
- Kornberg (827 m), Hof district, Fichtel Mountains
- Epprechtstein (798 m), Wunsiedel district, Fichtel Mountains
- Döbraberg (794 m), Hof district, Franconian Forest
- Buchberg, Wunsidel im Fichtelgebirge district, Fichtel Mountains
- Kleiner Kulm (626 m), Bayreuth district, Franconian Jura
- Rupprechtshöhe (617 m), Bayreuth district, Franconian Switzerland
- Sophienberg 596 m Bayreuth district (Haag parish)
- Hohenmirsberger Platte (614 m), Bayreuth district, Franconian Switzerland
- Hetzleser Berg (Hetzlas or Leyerberg) (549 m), Forchheim district, Franconian Switzerland
- Walberla (532 m), Forchheim district, Franconian Switzerland
- Buchberg (528 m), Coburg district, Lange mountains
- Hirschberg (493 m), Bayreuth district / Northeast Bavaria, Fichtel Mountains

== Lower Franconia ==
- Dammersfeldkuppe (928 m), Bavarian-Hessian border, Rhön
- Kreuzberg (928 m), Rhön-Grabfeld district, Rhön
- Heidelstein (926 m), Rhön-Grabfeld district, Rhön
- Eierhauckberg (910 m), Bavarian-Hessian border, Rhön
- Stirnberg (899 m), Bavarian-Hessian border, Rhön
- Hohe Hölle (894 m), Bavarian-Hessian border, Rhön
- Himmeldunkberg (888 m), Bavarian-Hessian border, Rhön
- Totnansberg (839 m; Black Mountains), Bad Kissingen district, Rhön
- Schwarzenberg (832 m; Black Mountains), Bad Kissingen district, Rhön
- Feuerberg (830 m), Bad Kissingen district, Rhön
- Kleiner Auersberg (809 m), Bad Kissingen district, Rhön
- Großer Auersberg (808 m), Bad Kissingen district, Rhön
- Querenberg (805 m), Rhön-Grabfeld district, Rhön
- Farnsberg (786 m), Bad Kissingen district, Rhön
- Hoher Dentschberg (778 m), Rhön-Grabfeld district, Rhön
- Lösershag (765 m), Bad Kissingen district, Rhön
- Gangolfsberg (737 m), Rhön-Grabfeld district, Rhön
- Platzer Kuppe (737 m; Black Mountains), Bad Kissingen district, Rhön
- Rother Kuppe (711 m), Rhön-Grabfeld district, Rhön
- Dreistelzberg (660 m), Bad Kissingen district, Rhön
- Geiersberg (586 m), Aschaffenburg district, Spessart
- Hermannskoppe (567 m), Bavarian-Hessian border, Spessart
- Querberg (567 m), Aschaffenburg district, Spessart
- Geierskopf (549 m), Aschaffenburg district, Spessart
- Weickertshöhe (545 m), Main-Spessart district, Spessart
- Steckenlaubshöhe (542 m), Main-Spessart district, Spessart
- Hoher Knuck (539 m), Main-Spessart district, Spessart
- Hohe Schule (538), Rhön-Grabfeld district, Rhön
- Hirschhöhe (537 m), Main-Spessart district, Spessart
- Sohlhöhe (530 m), Main-Spessart district, Spessart
- Obere Waldspitze (521 m), Bavarian-Hessian border, Spessart
- Geishöhe (521 m; with observation tower), Aschaffenburg district, Spessart
- Gauslkopf (519 m), Main-Spessart district, Spessart
- Rosskopf (Bavaria) (516 m), Bavarian-Hessian border, Spessart
- Großer Goldberg (515 m), Bavarian-Hessian border, Spessart
- Nassacher Höhe (512 m), Haßberge district, Haßberge Hills
- Steigkoppe (502 m), Aschaffenburg district, Spessart
- Pfirschhöhe (502 m), Main-Spessart district, Spessart
- Zabelstein (489 m), Schweinfurt district, Steigerwald
- Ospis (439m), Miltenberg district, Spessart
- Steinknückl (413 m), Aschaffenburg district, Spessart
- Eiersberg (349 m), municipality of Oberstreu

== Middle Franconia ==
- Hesselberg (689 m), Ansbach district, Franconian Jura, Wörnitz valley
- Dürrenberg (656 m), Weißenburg-Gunzenhausen district, Hahnenkamm (Altmühl Valley), Franconian Jura
- Efferaberg (645 m), Weißenburg-Gunzenhausen district, Hahnenkamm (Altmühl Valley), Franconian Jura
- Laubbichel (636 m), Weißenburg-Gunzenhausen district, Altmühl Valley Nature Park, Franconian Jura
- Hohenstein (634 m), Nürnberger Land district, Hersbruck Switzerland, Franconian Jura
- Leitenberg (616 m), Nürnberger Land district, Hersbruck Switzerland, Franconian Jura
- Dom (Nürnberger Land) (613 m), Nürnberger Land district, Hersbruck Switzerland, Franconian Jura
- Arzberg (612 m), Nürnberger Land district, Hersbruck Switzerland, Franconian Jura
- Schloßberg (607 m), bei Heideck, Roth district
- Moritzberg (603 m), Nürnberger Land district, Franconian Jura
- Großer Hansgörgel (601 m), Nürnberger Land district, Hersbruck Switzerland, Franconian Jura
- Hornberg (554 m), Ansbach district, Franconian Heights
- Birkenberg (547 m), Ansbach district, Franconian Heights
- Eichelberg (530 m), Ansbach district, Franconian Heights
- Laubersberg (517 m), Ansbach district, Franconian Heights
- Scheinberg (498 m), Neustadt (Aisch)-Bad Windsheim district, highest point of the Steigerwald
- Leitenberg (469 m), Roth district, Abenberg Forest, Georgensgmünd
- Schmausenbuck (390 m), town of Nuremberg, Franconian Jura

== See also ==
- List of the highest mountains in Germany
- List of the highest mountains in the German states
- List of mountain and hill ranges in Germany
