= Kälberbuckel =

Mountain in Bavaria, Germany

- Location within Bavaria

Highest point
- Elevation: 1,053 m (3,455 ft)
- Coordinates: 48°58′31″N 12°53′13″E

Geography
- Location: Bavaria, Germany

Kälberbuckel is a mountain in Bavaria, Germany. It is located west of the village of Achslach in the Bavarian Forest. The mountain is almost entirely forested.

The nearest neighboring mountains are Predigtstuhl (1024 m) to the northwest and Hirschenstein (1092 m) to the southeast, along the same ridge.
