= Soiernspitze =

Mountain

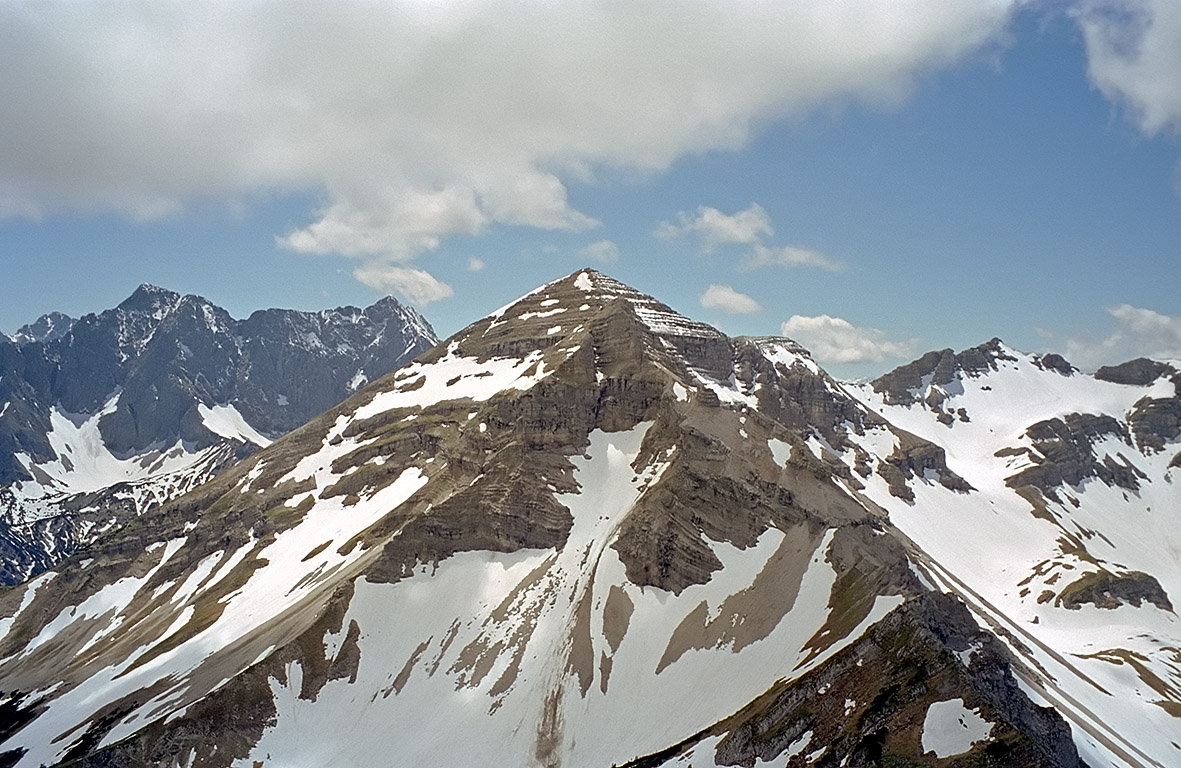
- Soiernspitze

Highest point
- Elevation: 2,257 m above sea level (NN) (7,405 ft)
- Prominence: 833 m (2,733 ft)
- Coordinates: 47°28′55″N 11°21′27″E

Geography
- Location within Bavaria
- Location: Bavaria, Germany
- Parent range: Karwendel (Soiern Group)

Geology
- Rock age(s): Norian, Triassic
- Mountain type: Plattenkalk

Climbing
- Easiest route: Mittenwald – Seinsbachtal – Fereinalm – Soiernspitze

At 2,257 metres, the Soiernspitze is the highest mountain in the Soiern Group in the Bavarian Karwendel range. Its summit may be climbed either from Seinsbachtal or from the Soiernhäusern by the lakes of Soiernseen in an easy mountain hike. The ridge walk to the nearby Schöttelkarspitze peak requires sure-footedness.

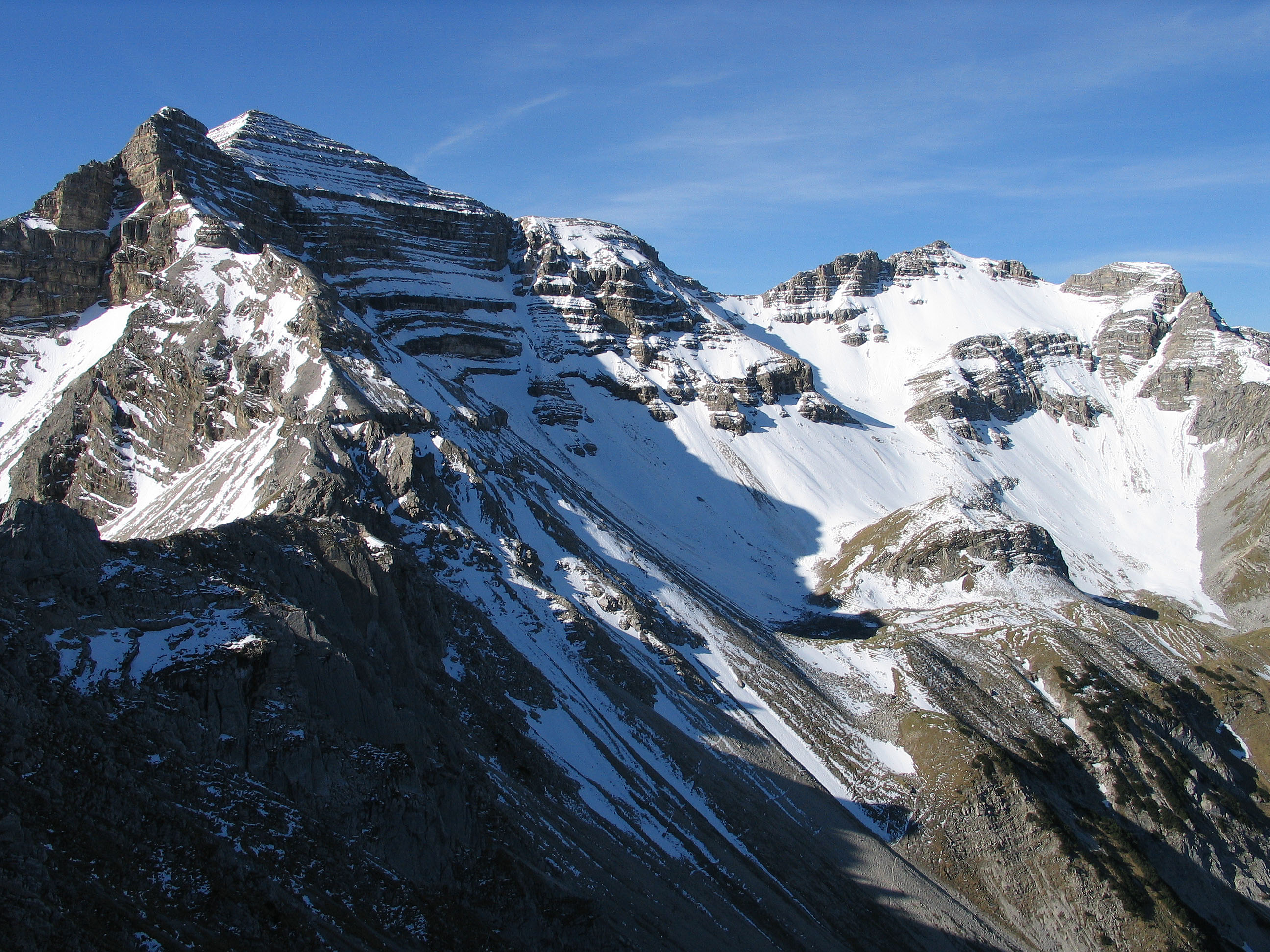
The Soiernspitze from the north
