= Eiersberg =

Mountain in Germany

Coordinates: 50°23′50″N 10°15′05″E

Highest point
- Elevation: 349 m (1,145 ft)

Geography
- Location: Bavaria, Germany

The Eiersberg is a hill in Bavaria, Germany. It is 349 metres high and located in the province of Lower Franconia, near Mittelstreu. On its slopes are the indications of human settlement from the early Ice Age.

== Geography ==
The mountain is an elongated ridge with a steep slope on the eastern side dropping down to the Streu, a tributary of the Franconian Saale by the village of Mittelstreu.

At the foot of the mountain there are several springs with a very high yield that directly feed the Streu.

== Hill settlement ==
The hill settlement is located on the plateau of the mountain on the eastern slope facing the Streu. A steep valley guards the north side of the site. On the southwestern side, the fortification can still be recognized today from a 130 metre long and up to 2 metre high rampart. Inside it, in an area of approximately 13,000 m², excavations have revealed rows of houses aligned with their longer sides towards the inner open space. These buildings were used as homes and stores.

Recent excavation phases in 1982 and 1985 with more precise archaeological studies, have concluded that there were the following development phases for the hill settlement:

- First populated probably from the Mesolithic, the older and especially the young Neolithic;
- Intensive settlement during the Hallstatt period;
- Largest expansion phase in the 4th century BC with a replacement of the old ramparts by a timber-framed wall and an almost 17 metre wide ditch
- Further phase of use in the 7th century AD

Archaeological finds include pottery, armrings, fibulae, elements of traditional costume, parts of metal objects and bronze vessels. The facility is one of the most extensive examined Iron Age heritage sites in Lower Franconia.

== Literature ==
- Burgen in Bayern, 7000 Jahre Geschichte im Luftbild. Konrad Theiss, 1999, ISBN 3-8062-1364-X
- Bad Kissingen, fränkische Saale, Grabfeld, südliche Rhön (= Führer zu vor- und frühgeschichtlichen Denkmälern. Vol. 28). Philip von Zabern, Mainz 1975.
- Stefan Gerlach: Der Eiersberg: Eine Höhensiedlung der Vorrömischen Eisenzeit und ihre Stellung in der Siedlungslandschaft zwischen Rhön und Thüringer Wald (= Materialhefte zur Bayerischen Vorgeschichte. Vol. A 69). M. Lassleben, Kallmünz/Opf. 1995, ISBN 3-7847-5069-9.

== See also ==
- List of mountains of Bavaria
