= Ospis =

Mountain in Bavaria, Germany

Coordinates: 49°45′N 9°16′E

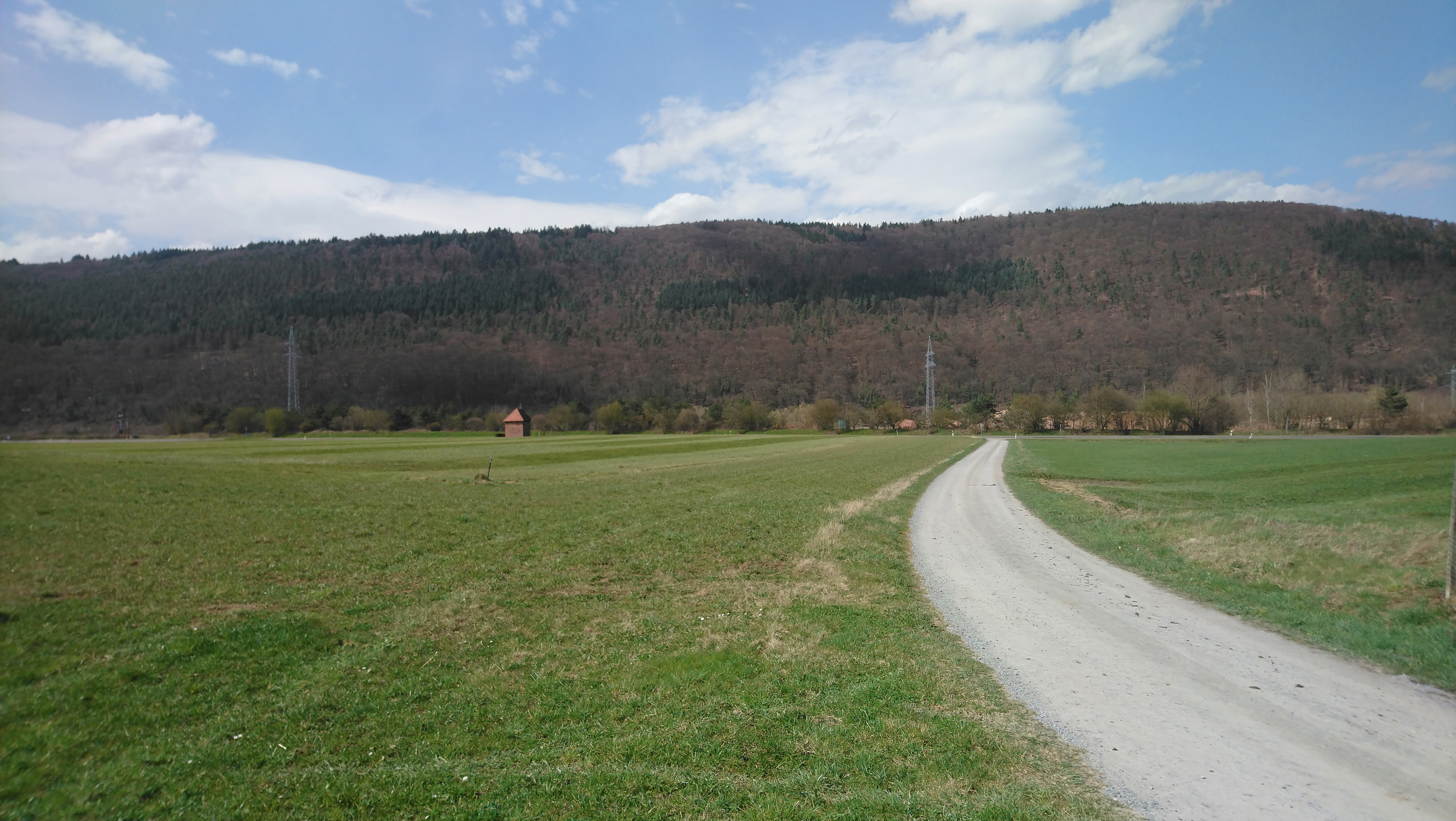

Highest point
- Elevation: 439 m (1,440 ft)

Geography
- Location: Bavaria, Germany

Ospis is a mountain in Bavaria, Germany.

== Geography ==
Ospis lies in the Bavarian district of Miltenberg. The Eselsweg, a medieval trade route that is now used as a hiking trail, passes over the Ospis. The summit marks the highest point of the municipal area of Großheubach, at 439 m. It is approximately 3 km from Kloster Engelberg.

Since 2007, a masonry summit cross has stood on the peak. The summit cross is located directly on the Eselsweg.

== See also ==
- List of mountains of Bavaria
