= Gangolfsberg =

Mountain in central Germany

Highest point
- Elevation: 736 m (2,415 ft)
- Coordinates: 50°27′53″N 10°05′07″E

Geography
- Location: Bavaria, Germany

Gangolfsberg is a mountain of Bavaria, Germany.
