= Kotzen (mountain) =

Mountain in Bavaria, Germany

Coordinates: 47°32′N 11°31′E

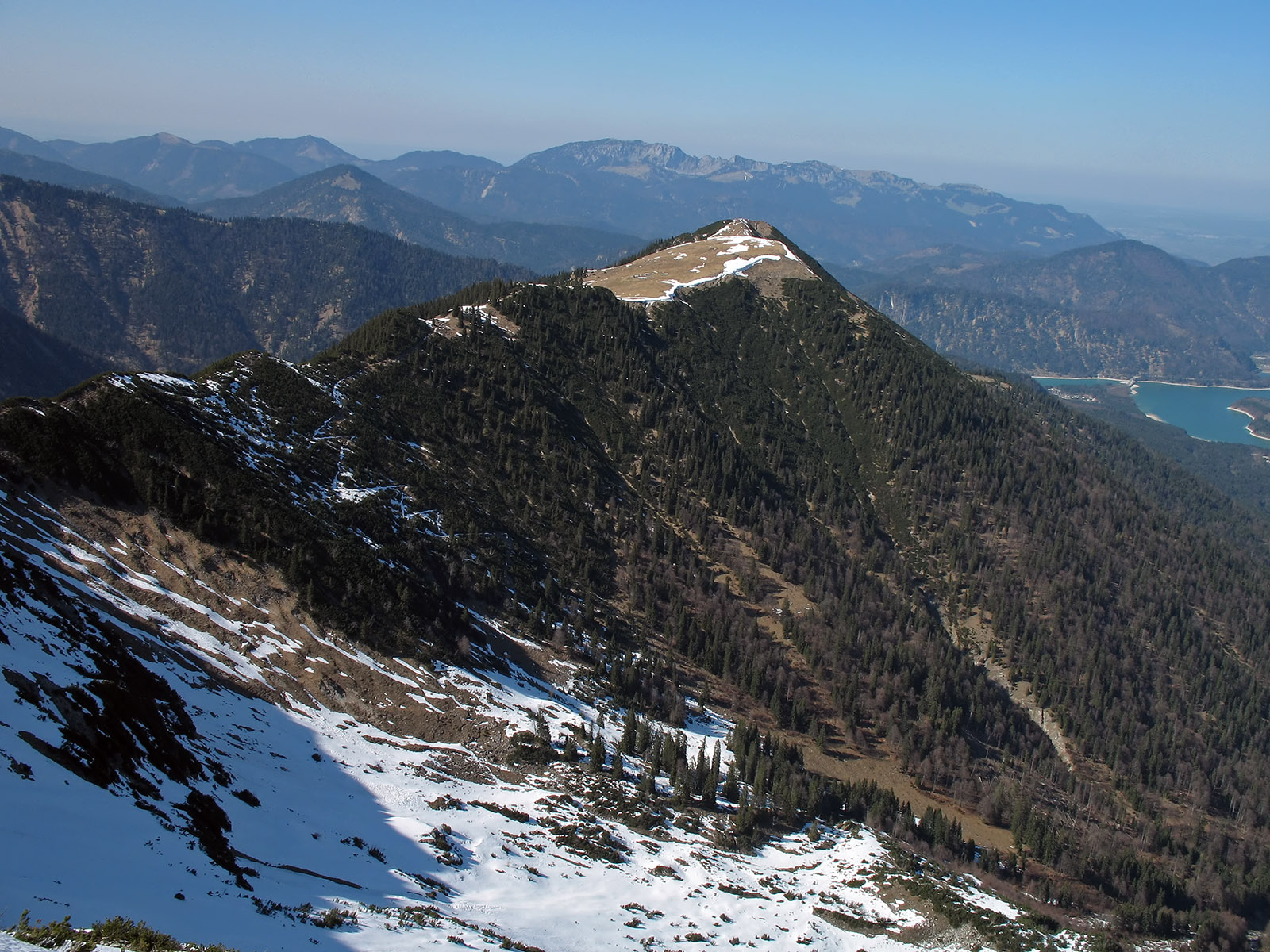
- Kotzen Mountain in Bavaria, Germany

Highest point
- Elevation: 1,771 m (5,810 ft)

Geography
- Location: Bavaria, Germany

Kotzen is a mountain of Bavaria, Germany.
