= Zwiesel (mountain) =

Mountain in Bavaria, Germany

Coordinates: 47°45′21″N 12°48′43″E

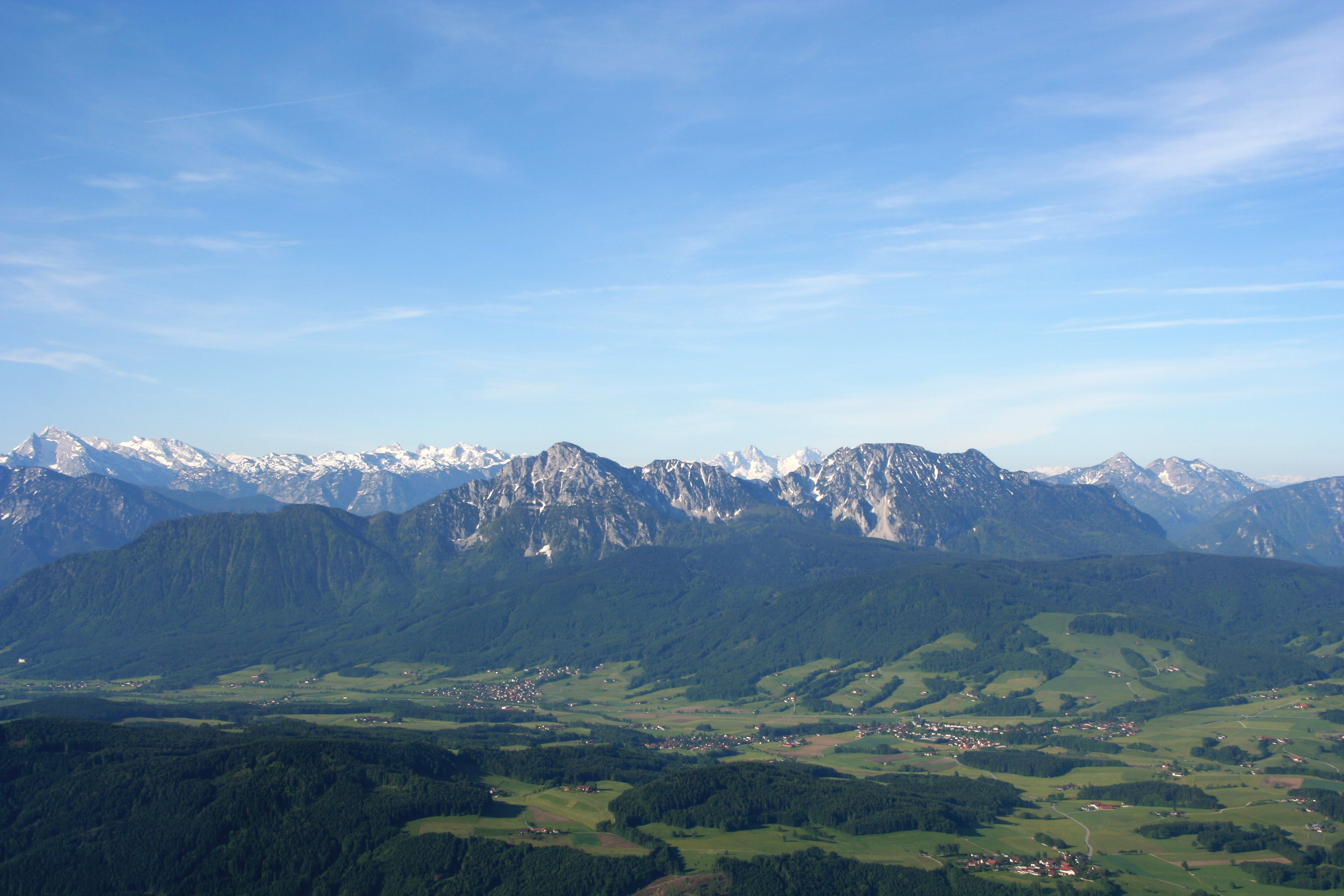

Highest point
- Elevation: 1,782 m (5,846 ft)
- Prominence: 1,060 m (3,480 ft)

Geography
- Location: Bavaria, Germany

The Zwiesel is a mountain, 1,782 metres high, in the Chiemgau Alps in Bavaria, Germany.
