= Oberreintalschrofen =

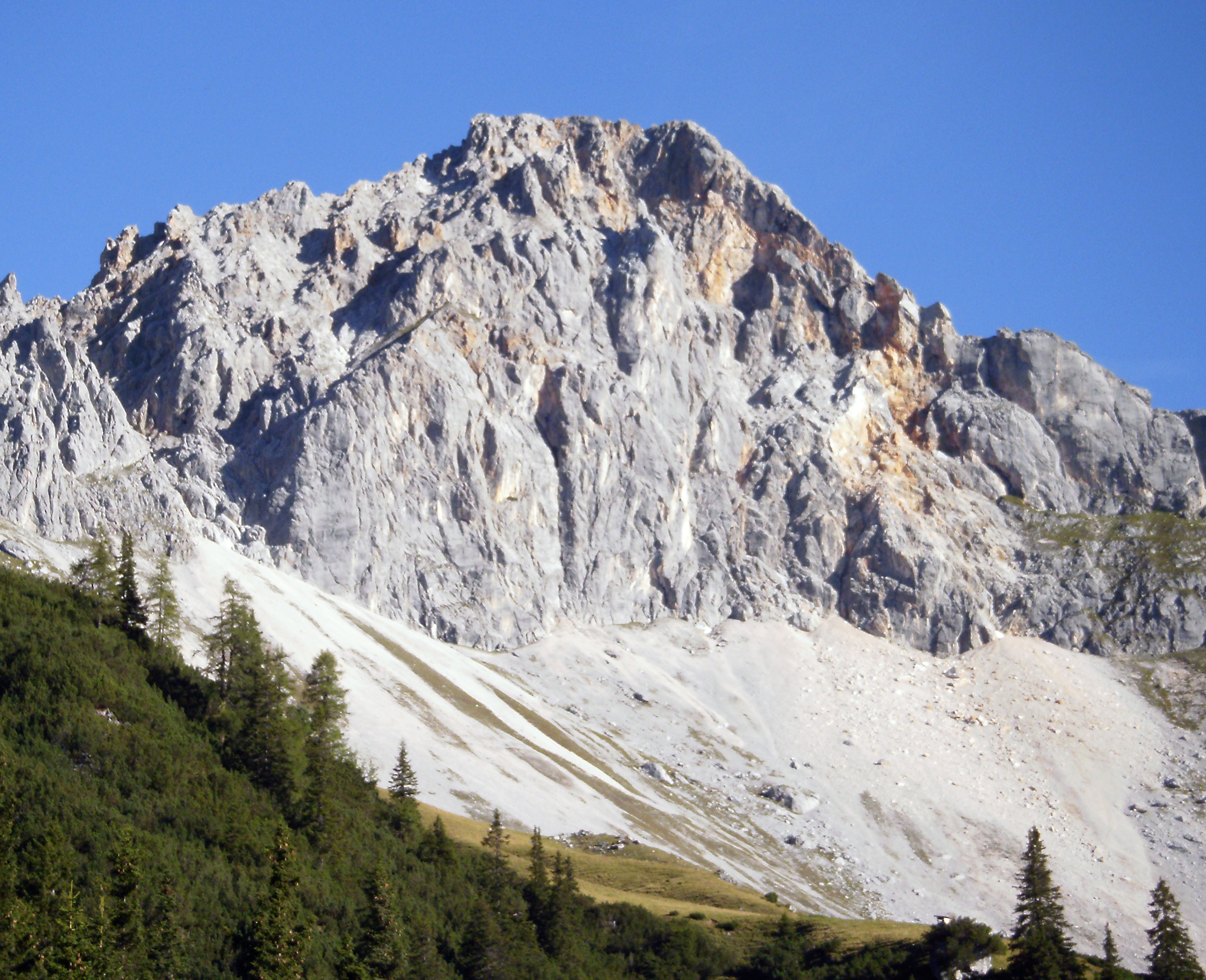

Highest point
- Elevation: 2,523 m (8,278 ft)
- Coordinates: 47°23′44″N 11°6′16″E

Geography
- Location: Bavaria, Germany and Tyrol, Austria
- Parent range: Northern Limestone Alps

Oberreintalschrofen (Upper Rhine Crag) is a mountain on the border of Bavaria, Germany and Tyrol, Austria. The first recorded ascent was by Hermann von Barth.
