= Hornberg (Frankenhöhe) =

Mountain of Bavaria

Coordinates: 49°13′28″N 10°10′10″E

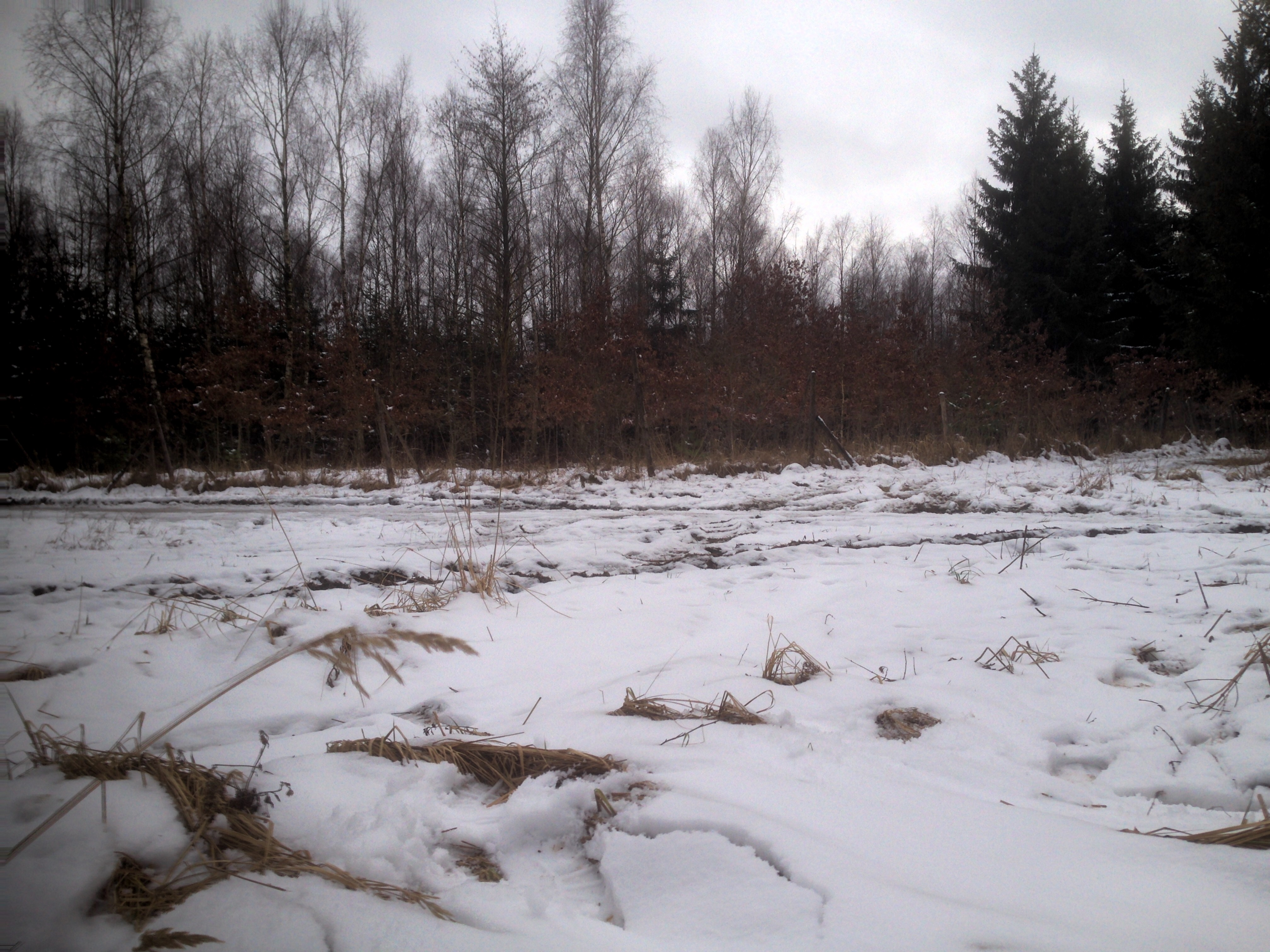
- Top of the Hornberg

Highest point
- Elevation: 554 m (1,818 ft)
- Isolation: 22.64 km (14.07 mi) to Hornberg

Geography
- Location: Bavaria, Germany

Hornberg (Frankenhöhe) is a mountain of Bavaria, Germany.
