= Jochköpfl (Bavaria) =

- Location within Bavaria

Highest point
- Elevation: 1,575 m (5,167 ft)
- Coordinates: 47°38′36″N 12°52′33″E

Geography
- Location: Bavaria
- Parent range: Latten Mountains

The Jochköpfl (also: Feuerspitz) is a mountain, 1,575 m above sea level (NN), in the Latten Mountains in the Berchtesgaden Alps. It is located in the German federal state of Bavaria.
