= Hausstein =

Mountain in Germany

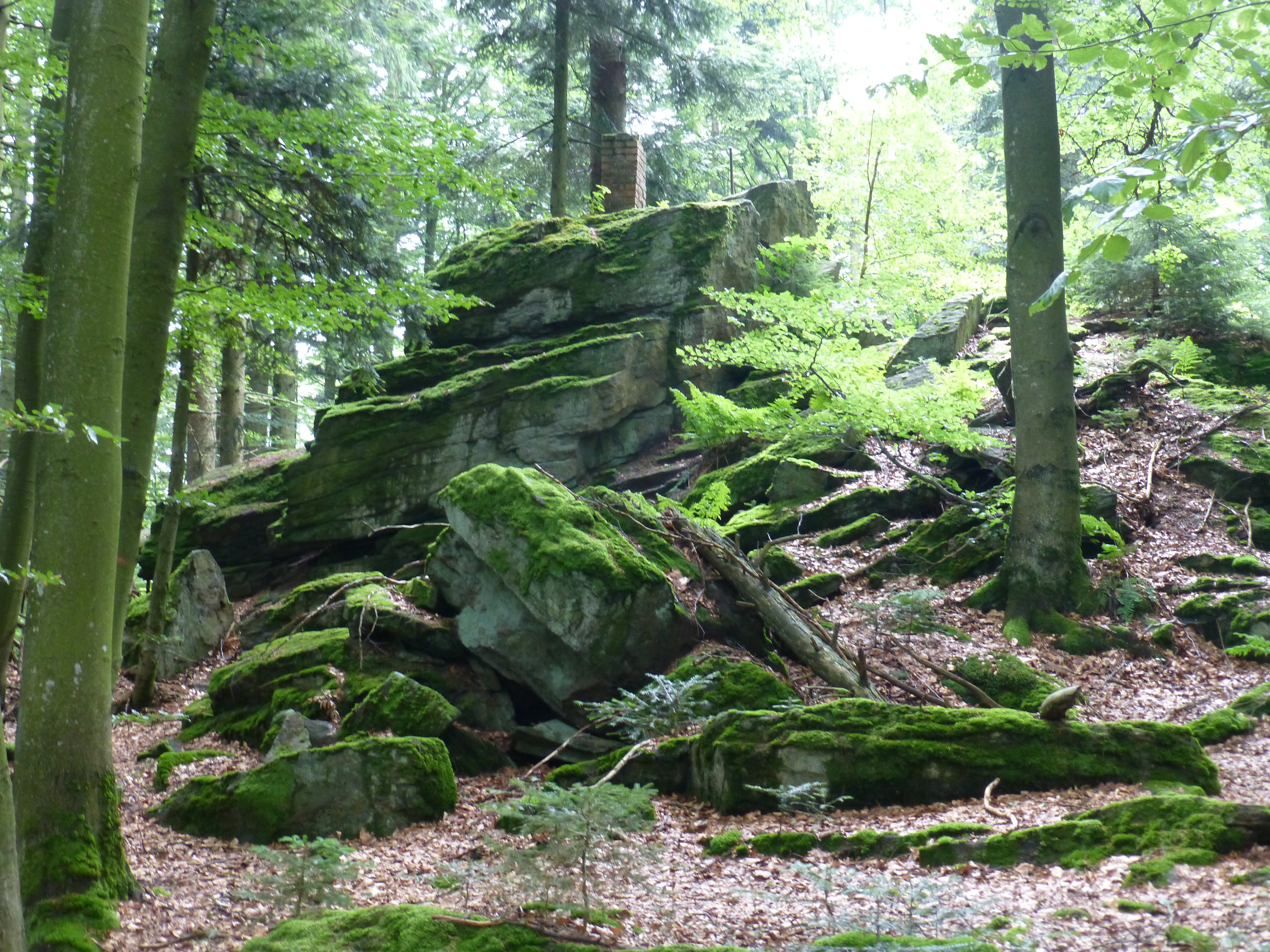
- Summit of the Hausstein. View from NE of the rock blocks and the brick tower

Highest point
- Elevation: 917 m above sea level (NHN) (3,009 ft)
- Coordinates: 48°52′17″N 13°04′14″E

Geography
- Location within Bavaria
- Location: Municipality of Schaufling, Deggendorf, Bavaria, Germany
- Parent range: Bavarian Forest

Geology
- Rock type(s): Gneiss, granite

The Hausstein is a mountain in Bavaria, Germany.

The 917-metre-high (3,009 ft) Hausstein ("House-stone") is a mountain in the Anterior Bavarian Forest, southwest of the Lower Bavarian town of Regen, and northeast of the town of Deggendorf, and is located in the municipality of Schaufling, in the district of Deggendorf.

On the west side of the mountain, there are two ski lifts for Alpine skiers and others, with up to 1,100 metres (3,600 ft), which is part of the ski and cross-country centre of Deggendorf-Rusel-Hausstein. North of the mountain is the Rusel; on the south side is located in panoramic position, the Asklepios Clinic of Schaufling.
