= Birkenberg =

Mountain in Germany

Highest point
- Elevation: 547 m (1,795 ft)
- Coordinates: 49°12′45″N 10°09′40″E

Geography
- Location: Bavaria, Germany

Birkenberg is a mountain of Bavaria, Germany. It is the second highest mountain in Frankenhöhe.

== History ==
The Birkenberg mountain and the whole mountain range used to be called "Hedelberg". It was named this when the area was a mining zone, until the 17th century. Once the mining was done, they renamed the mountain to "Birkenberg", which means birch mountain. It was called this because they chopped down birch trees in the low mountain ranges. After about 15 to 40 years, the whole mountain was cleared of birch trees, where it was used as an area of pasture for around two years. After this, the birch trees grew back at a rapid rate out of their stumps, which gave the name birch mountain.
