= Totnansberg =

Mountain in Germany

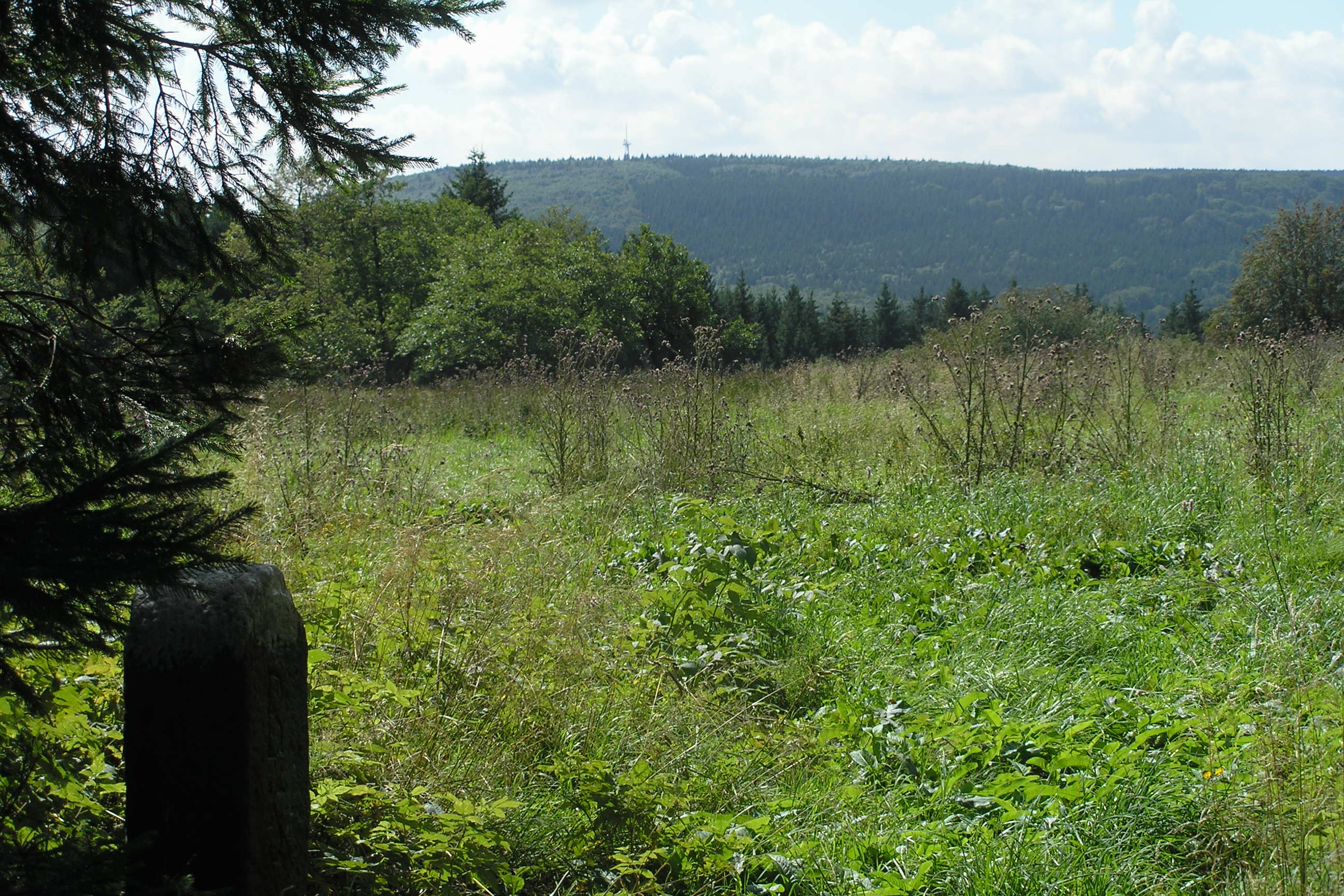
- View of the Totnansberg from the area of the Kissinger Hut

Highest point
- Elevation: 839.4 m above sea level (NHN) (2,754 ft)
- Prominence: 177 m ↓ Guckaspaß
- Isolation: 6.0 km → Kreuzberg
- Coordinates: 50°19′16″N 9°55′49″E

Geography
- Location within Bavaria
- Location: between Gefäll and Oberbach; Bad Kissingen, Bavaria (Germany)
- Parent range: Rhön (Black Mountains)

Climbing
- Access: Forest tracks

The Totnansberg, occasionally also called the Totmannsberg, is the highest peak in the Black Mountains, a subunit of the Rhön in central Germany.
