= Göschberg =

- Location within Bavaria

Highest point
- Elevation: 620.6 m (2,036 ft)
- Coordinates: 49°10′N 11°36′E

Geography
- Location: Bavaria, Germany

Göschberg is a mountain of Bavaria, Germany.
