= Weickertshöhe =

Mountain in Bavaria, Germany

Coordinates: 49°59′36″N 9°28′31″E

Highest point
- Elevation: 546 m (1,791 ft)

Geography
- Location: Bavaria, Germany

Weickertshöhe is a mountain of Bavaria, Germany.
