= Nassacher Höhe =

Mountain in Germany

Coordinates: 50°11′N 10°29′E

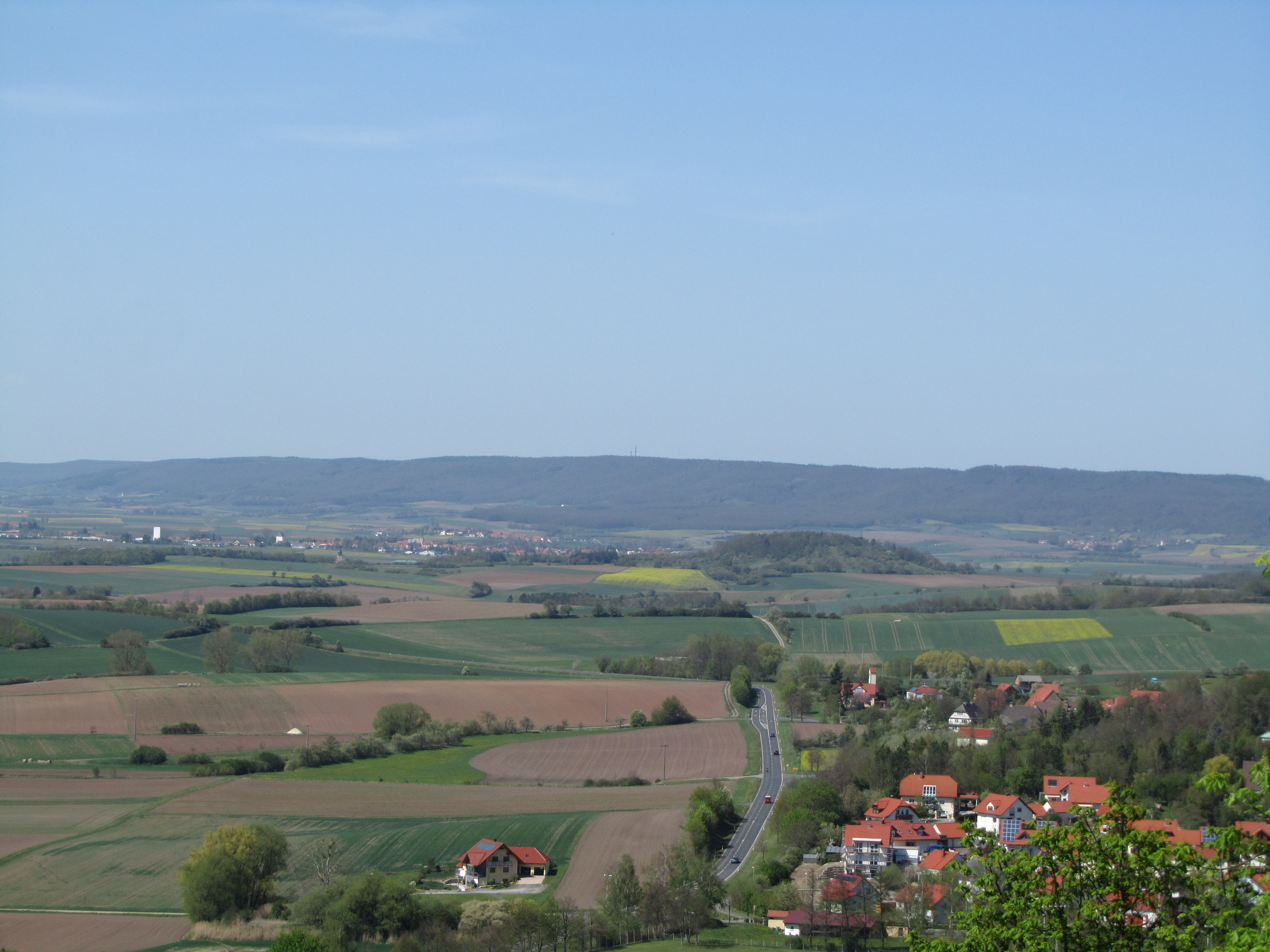
- The Nassacher Höhe in the Hassberge mountains

Highest point
- Elevation: 512 m (1,680 ft)

Geography
- Location: Bavaria, Germany

Nassacher Höhe is a mountain of Bavaria, Germany. The highest point of the Hassberge. It is 512 m above NN.
