= Großer Traithen =

German Mountain in the Eastern Alps

Coordinates: 47°39′N 12°02′E

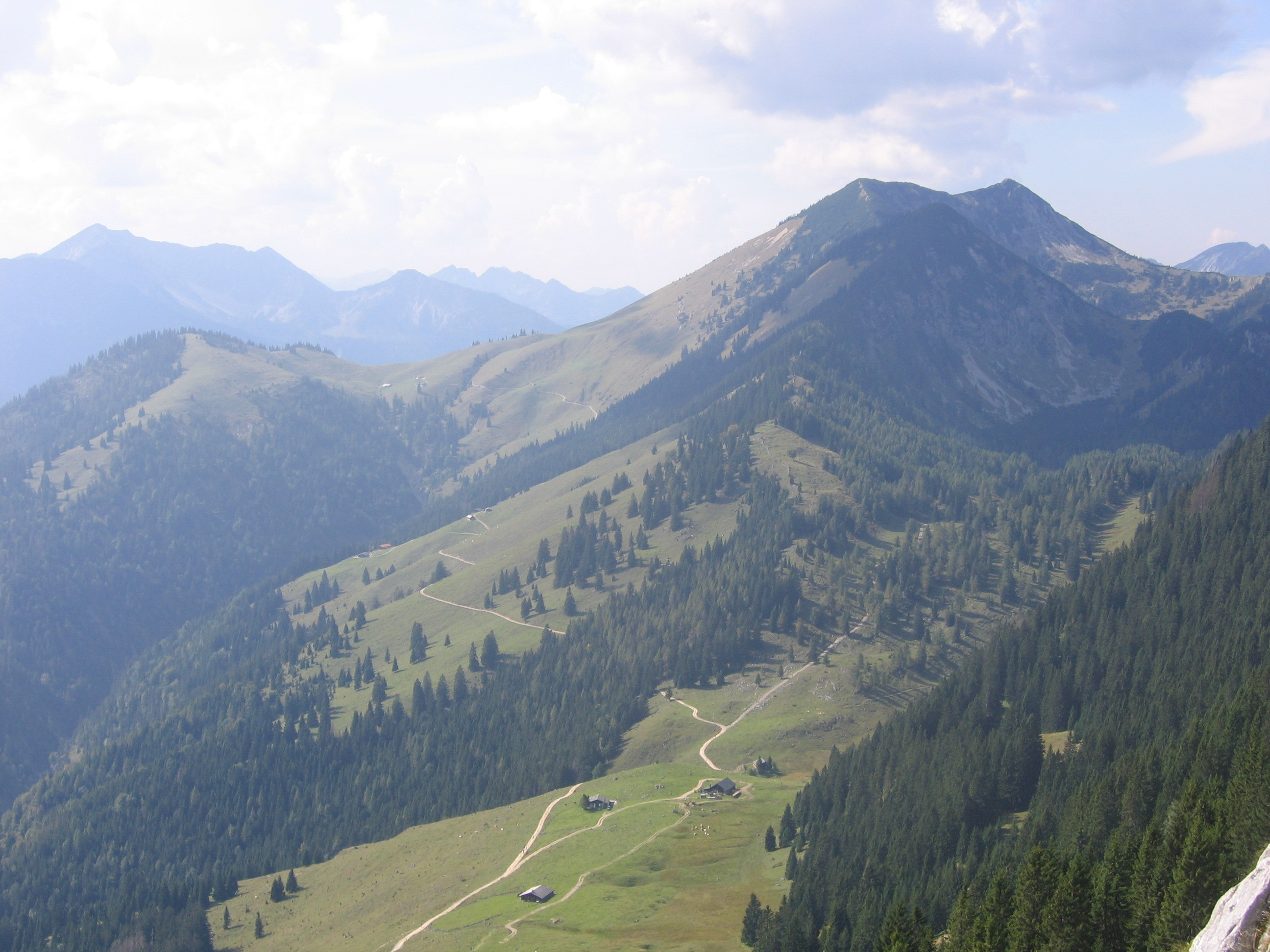
- Großer Traithen viewed from Brünnstein

Highest point
- Elevation: 1,852 m (6,076 ft)
- Prominence: 1,007 m (3,304 ft)

Geography
- Location: Bavaria, Germany

Großer Traithen is a mountain of Bavaria, Germany. It is part of the Eastern Alps.
