= Döbraberg =

Mountain in Germany

Coordinates: 50°16′N 11°39′E

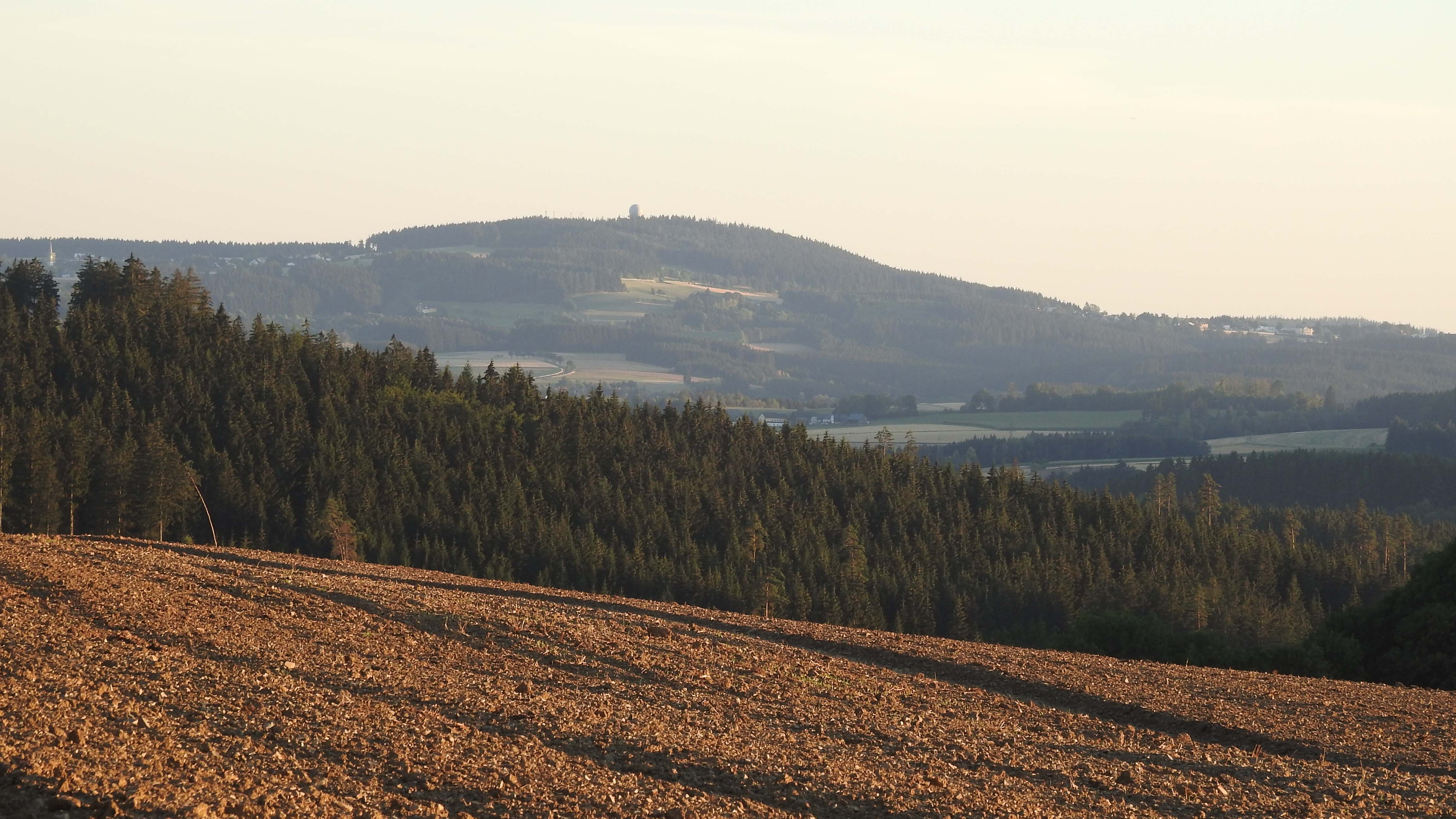

Highest point
- Elevation: 794.6 m (2,607 ft)

Geography
- Location: Bavaria, Germany

Döbraberg (German pronunciation: [ˈdøːbʁaˌbɛʁk]) is a mountain of Bavaria, Germany.
