= Berchtesgadener Hochthron =

Berchtesgaden Hochthron
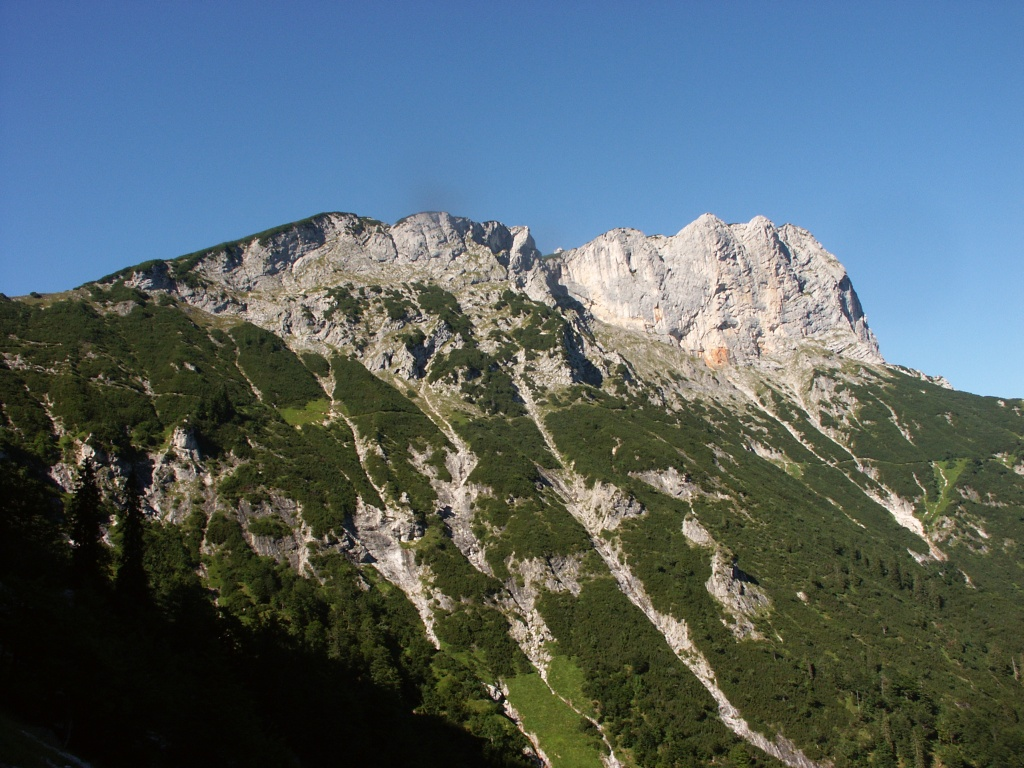
- View from the Stöhrweg; Berchtesgaden Hochthron

Highest point
- Elevation: 1,973 m (6,473 ft)
- Prominence: 1,278 m (4,193 ft)
- Coordinates: 47°41′38.5″N 12°59′10″E

Geography
- Location within Bavaria
- Location: Bavaria, Germany
- Parent range: Berchtesgaden Alps

The Berchtesgaden Hochthron is the highest peak of the Untersberg massif in the Berchtesgaden Alps in Berchtesgaden, Bavaria, Germany.

The summit of the Berchtesgaden Hochthron offers one of the best views of the Berchtesgaden region, because it has an unobstructed view over the Berchtesgaden valley as well as all nine massifs of the Berchtesgaden Alps, the Chiemgau Alps, the Austrian mountains of the Salzkammergut and the Tennengebirge.

== Geography ==
The Berchtesgaden Hochthron rises around 7 km (4.3 mi) north of Berchtesgaden and about 8 km (5.0 mi) east-southeast from Bad Reichenhall.

About 470 m (1,540 ft) west of the mountain summit is Stöhrhaus, managed by the German Alpine Club in the summer. At the foot of the steep falls of the summit lie the headwaters of the Almbach, which ends after flowing through the Almbachklamm in Berchtesgadener Ache from the south.

== Climbing ==
There are several marked trails that lead to the summit of the Berchtesgaden, and most of them are moderately strenuous hikes. It is also a popular destination for rock climbers. The Berchtesgaden Hochthron stops with massive, partly overhanging cliffs to the east and south. The numerous climbing routes of the south wall are among the most popular and historically significant climbs of the Berchtesgaden Alps. The most difficult climbs are usually attempted in November on the "Old South Face" ( Level III +).

== Galileo Test Environment ==
Near the Stöhrhaus is one of the six base stations for the testing and development of the Galileo navigational satellites.
