= Kleiner Kulm =

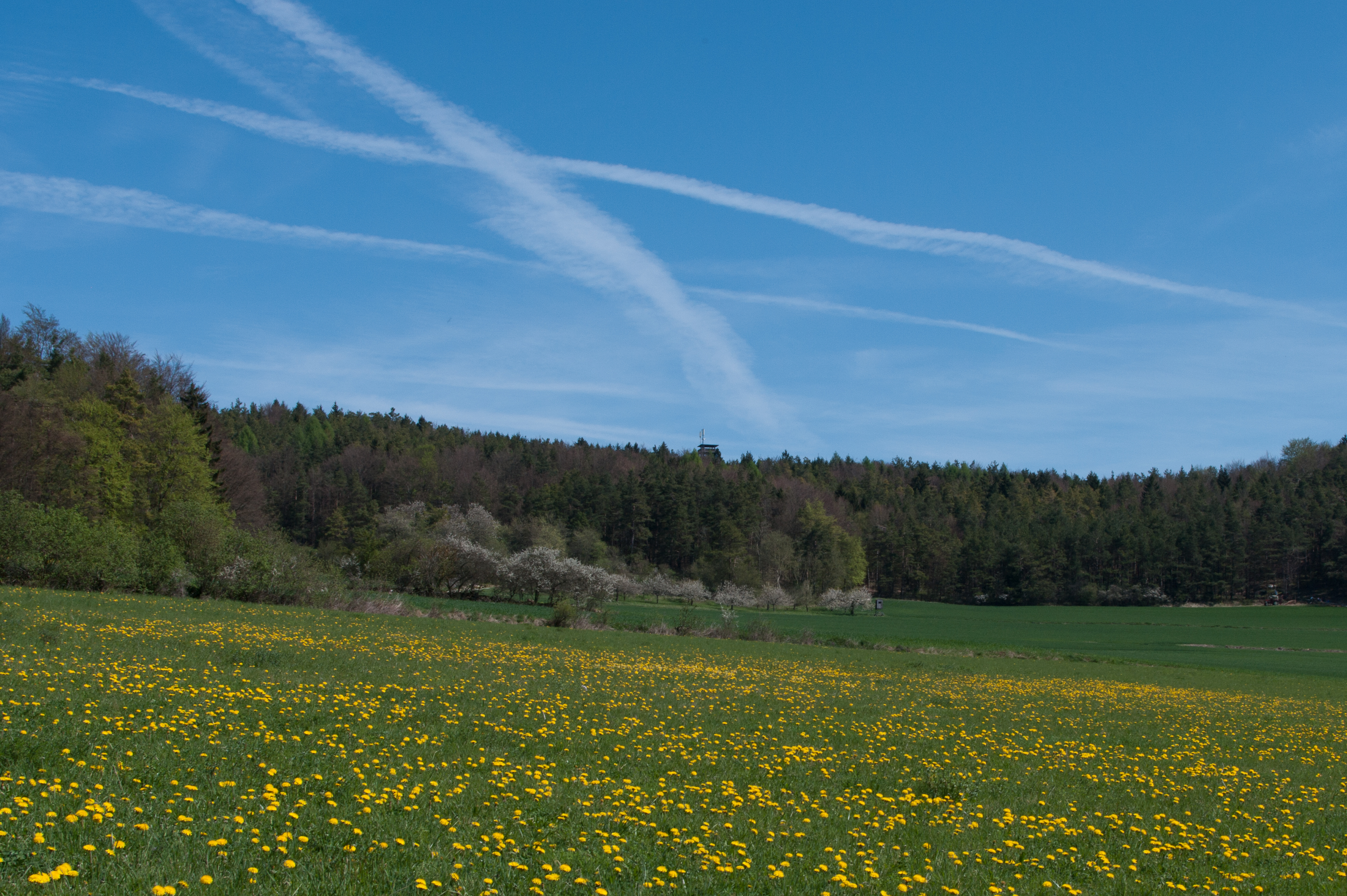

Highest point
- Elevation: 626 m (2,054 ft)
- Coordinates: 49°47′N 11°31′E

Geography
- Location within Bavaria
- Location: Bavaria, Germany

The Kleiner Kulm is a mountain in Bavaria, Germany. The mountain has a height of 626 m and thereby is the highest point of the Franconian Switzerland. On top, there is a lookout tower of 11 metres, which gives a view over the surrounding landscape.
