= Grünstein (Watzmann) =

Mountain in Germany

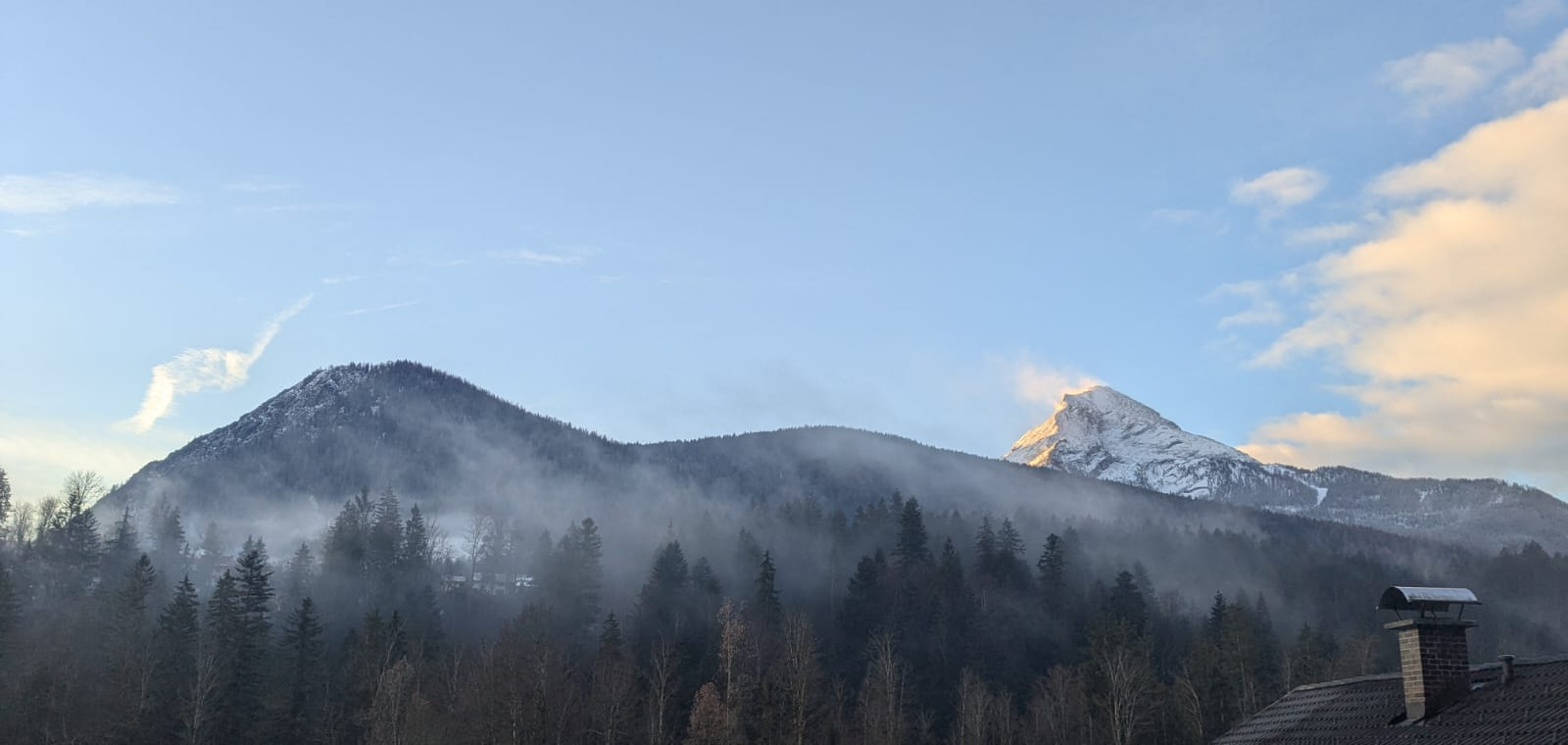
- Grünstein's northern slope (left peak). The Watzmann peak can be seen in the background on the right.

Highest point
- Elevation: 1,304 m (4,278 ft)
- Coordinates: 47°35′40″N 12°57′56″E

Naming
- Etymology: Derived from the former name ‘Grindstein’ (Grind = head in old German; Stein = stone), and before that also “Grundstein”, after the area ‘Im Grund’ east of the mountain.

Geography
- Location: Bavaria, Germany

Grünstein is a mountain in the German state of Bavaria standing 1,304 m (4,278 ft) above sea level. It is part of the Watzmann massif in the Berchtesgaden Alps and located majorly within the Berchtesgaden National Park. Its summit offers a panoramic view of the Berchtesgaden valley basin, including the village of Berchtesgaden, as well as the surrounding mountains Watzmann, Steinernes Meer, Hagengebirge, Hoher Göll, Untersberg, Lattengebirge, Reiteralpe, and Hochkalter.

== Access points ==
The easiest route to the summit takes around 1½ hours and leads from the Hammerstiel car park in Oberschönau past the hut Grünsteinhütte at 1,220 m (4,000 ft). Another steeper route starts from the lake Königssee towards the Grünsteinhütte, at which point it follows the same track as the easy route.

From Grünstein it is possible to cross over to the Kührointalm, a hut at the foot of the Watzmann massif.

== Rock climbing routes ==
Construction of Grünstein's first climbing route began on 21 June 2009. It was completed eight weeks later and named the Isidor climbing route, named after Isidor Grassl. The route leads to the summit at difficulty level C. There is also a variant at difficulty level D, which starts is further to the right and leads to the level C variant after around a third of the route length via a suspension bridge.

Since 2011, a third variant called Räuberleiter has been available at difficulty level D/E and longer than the previous variant. The Räuberleiter leads into the level D variant just below the suspension bridge. In 2013, another level D/E route called "Intersport-Renoth Gipfelwand" was opened and features overhanging passages.

== Broadcasting systems ==
The Grünstein summit harbours one of the six transmitters installed in the Berchtesgaden region that serve as pseudolites in the Galileo test and development environment (GATE) of the European satellite navigation system Galileo, the European alternative to GPS satellites.
