= Klausenstein (Bavaria) =

Mountain in Germany

Coordinates: 48°57′09″N 12°53′44″E

Klausenstein (Bayern)
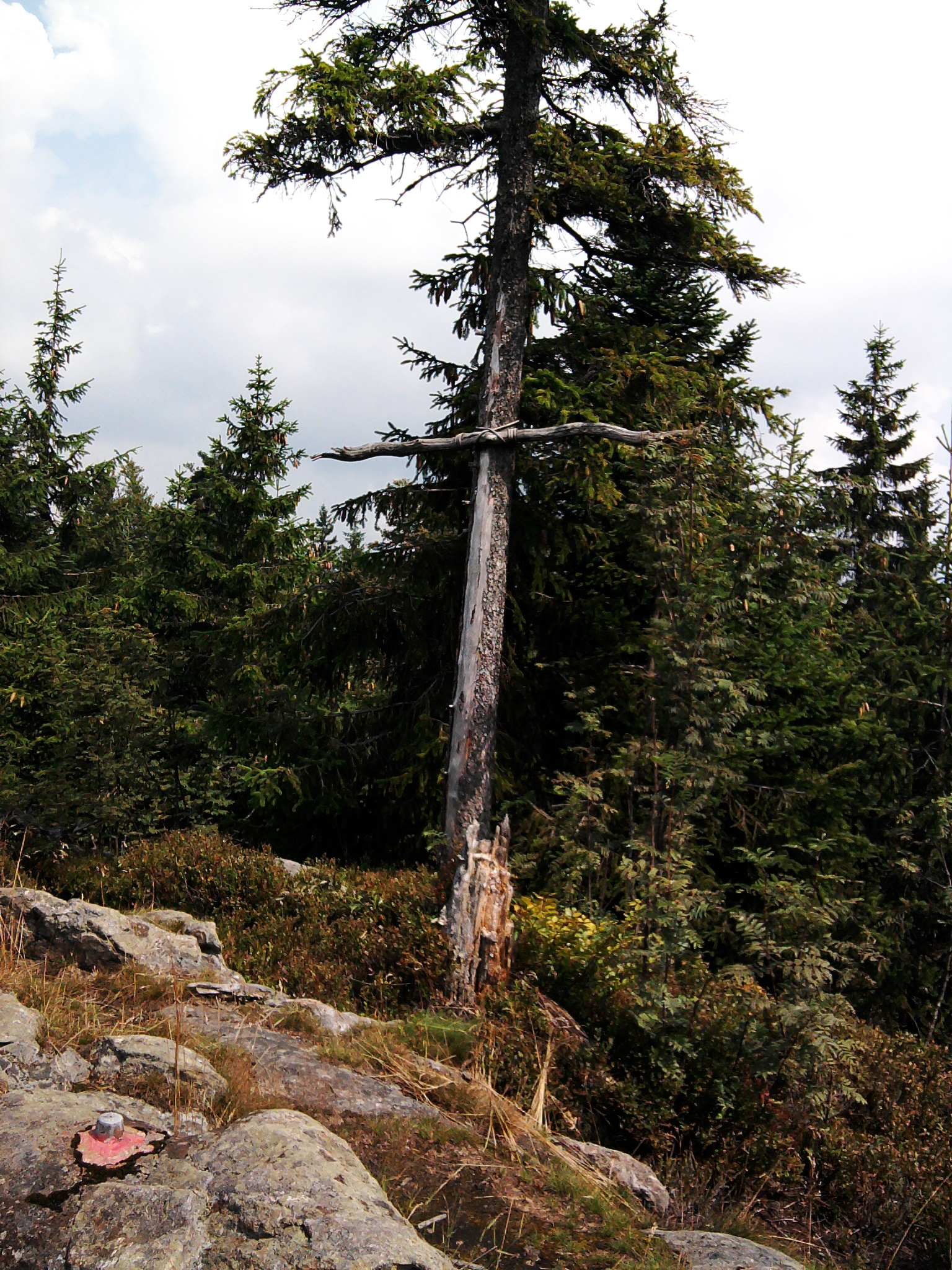

Highest point
- Elevation: 1,048 m (3,438 ft)

Geography
- Location: Bavaria, Germany
- Parent range: Bayerischer Wald

Klausenstein (Bayern) is a mountain of Bavaria, Germany.
