= Kreuzfelsen (Upper Palatine Forest) =

Mountain in Germany

Coordinates: 49°10′35″N 12°55′22″E

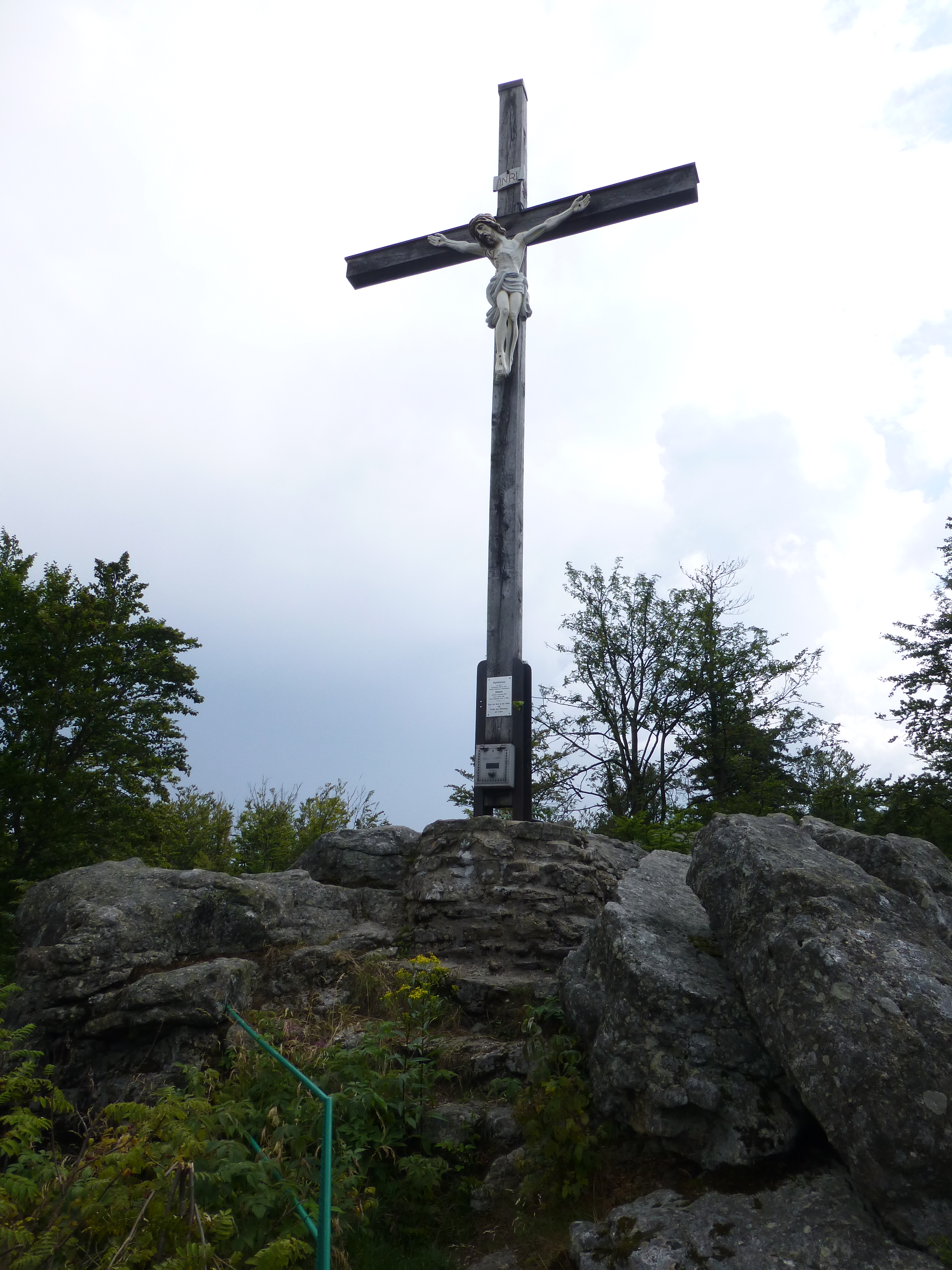
Summit of the Kreuzfelsen

The Kreuzfelsen is a mountain in the Upper Palatine Forest in Germany, near the border with the Czech Republic. With an elevation of 938 m (3,077 ft), the Kreuzfelsen is the sixth-highest mountain in the Upper Palatine Forest and the highest mountain on the German side of the mountain range. The Kreuzfelsen is located at the southern end of the Upper Palatine Forest, between the cities of Furth im Wald and Waldmünchen.
