= Schöttelkarspitze =

Bavarian mountain

Coordinates: 47°29′40″N 11°19′45″E

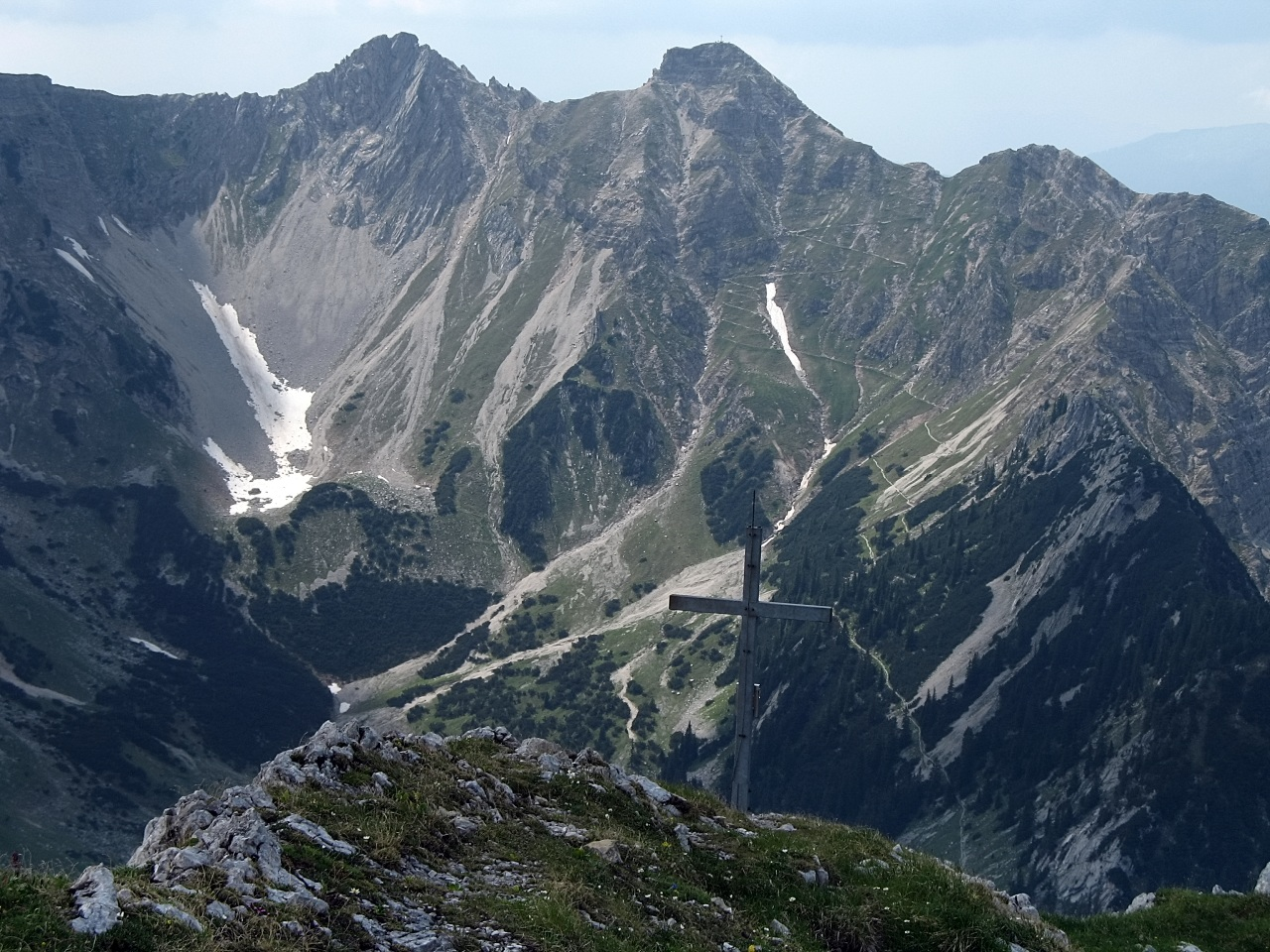

Highest point
- Elevation: 2,050 m (6,730 ft)

Geography
- Location: Bavaria, Germany

The Schöttelkarspitze is a mountain in the Soiern mountain range of Karwendel, Bavaria. It rises 2,050 metres (6,730 ft) above sea level. The mountain has a prominence of 1.1 kilometres (3,600 ft). The mountain originates from the Triassic period and is composed mainly of Main Dolomite.

== Hiking ==
The summit can be reached from Krün or Wallgau either via the Soiernhaus on the Soiernseen as an easy mountain tour or via the nearby mountains Seinskopf and Feldernkreuz. The ridge path to the Soiernspitze also requires sure-footedness; However, the official hiking trail is not difficult and often runs slightly below the ridge. The official hiking trails are not difficult but the other ways require skill.

== History ==
At the top, King Ludwig II of Bavaria had a pavilion built, which he named Belvedere. He used this as a retreat for drinking tea. The pavilion burned down at the beginning of the 20th century.

Even today, the construction work on behalf of Ludwig II of Bavaria can be recognized by the fact that the path from the Soeirnhaus up to the summit of the Schöttelkarspitze is unusually wide for such a route, as it is exactly the same width needed for the royal sedan chair and its bearers.
