= Hirschenstein (Bavarian Forest) =

Mountain in Germany

Coordinates: 48°58′N 12°53′E

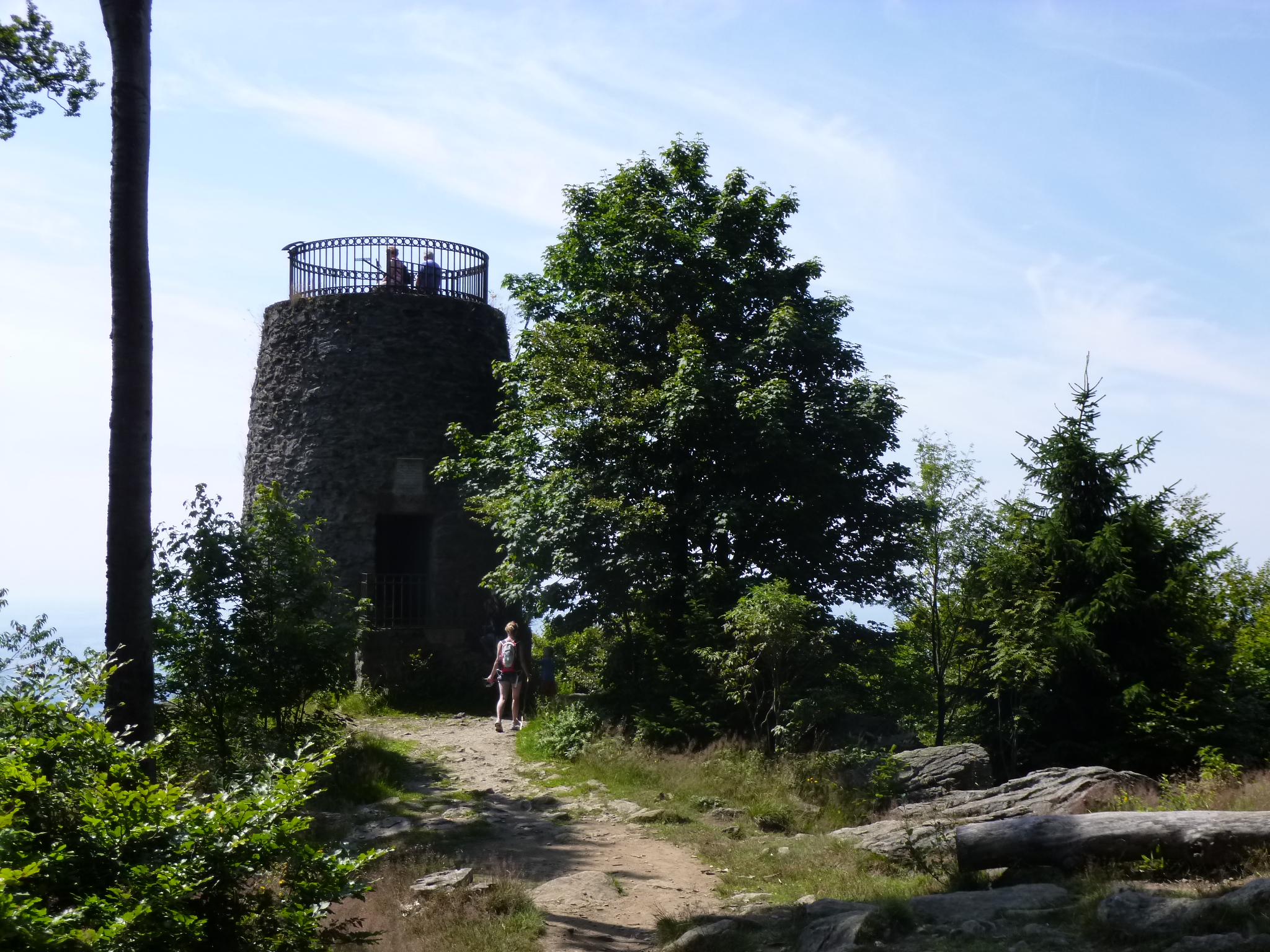
- tower on top of Hirschenstein

Highest point
- Elevation: 1,089 m (3,573 ft)

Geography
- Location: Bavaria, Germany

The Hirschenstein is a 1,089-metre-high (3,573 ft) mountain in Bavaria, Germany.

The Hirschenstein is a popular mountain for walkers and hikers in the Bavarian Forest. The Schuhfleck is easily the most important trail hub. Nine paths meet here, coming from all points of the compass and from places such as Kalteck, Bernried, Grandsberg, Rettenbach and Sankt Englmar zusammen.

From the Schuhfleck there are four trails leading to the Hirschenstein. The Hirschenstein summit with its exposed location and seven-metre-high observation tower has unique panorama of the Bavarian Forest. To the east the view stretches from the Großer Arber to the Dreisessel, to the south from Deggendorf to Straubing and to the west as far as the Gallner. On about twenty days a year the Alps may be made out from the Dachstein to the Zugspitze.
