= Predigtstuhl (Lower Bavaria) =

Mountain in Germany

Coordinates: 49°00′08″N 12°50′57″E

Predigtstuhl (Niederbayern)
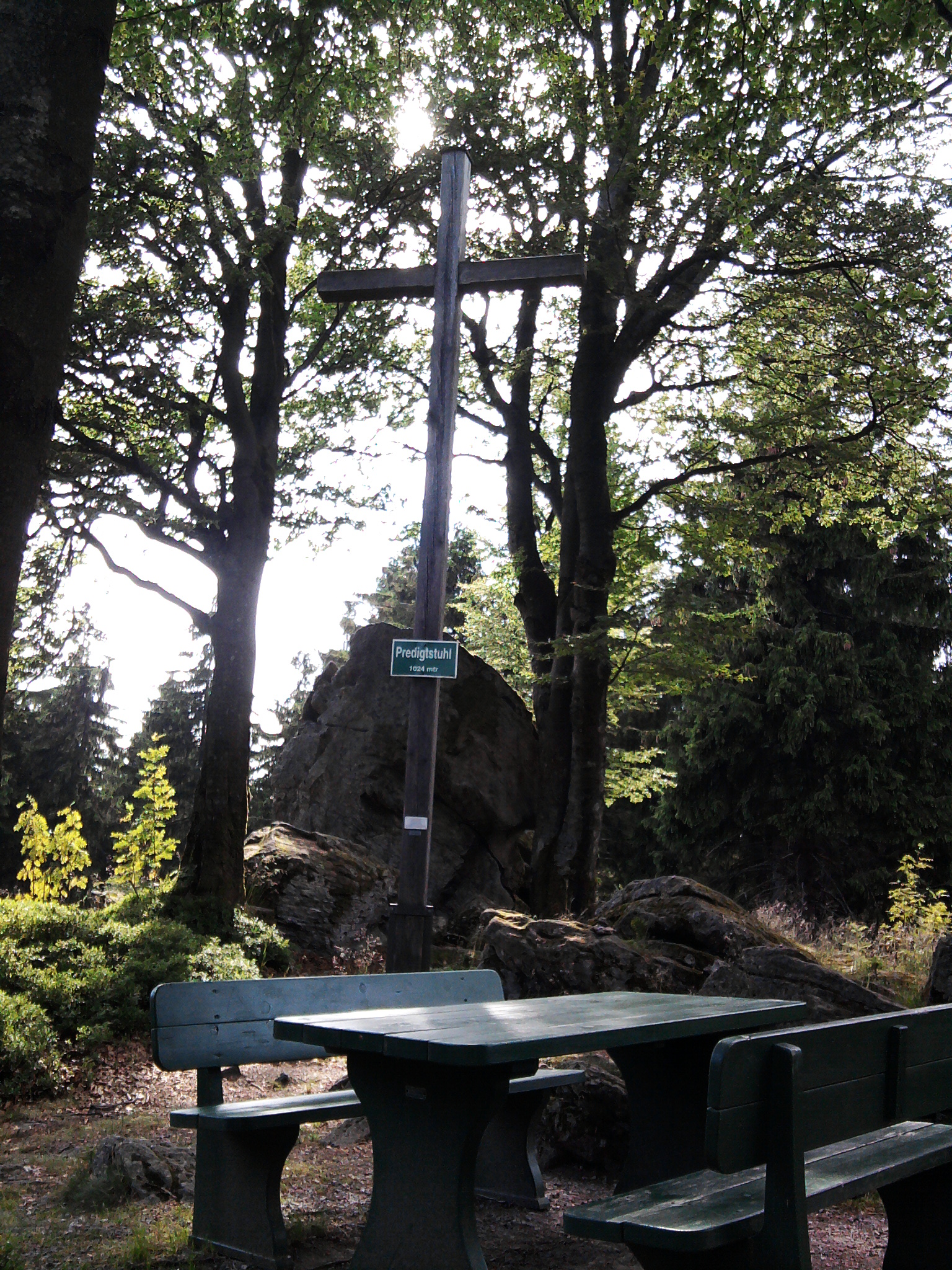

Highest point
- Elevation: 1,024 m (3,360 ft)

Geography
- Location: Bavaria, Germany

Predigtstuhl (Niederbayern) is a mountain of Bavaria, Germany.
