= Rinnerspitz =

- (Peißenberg)
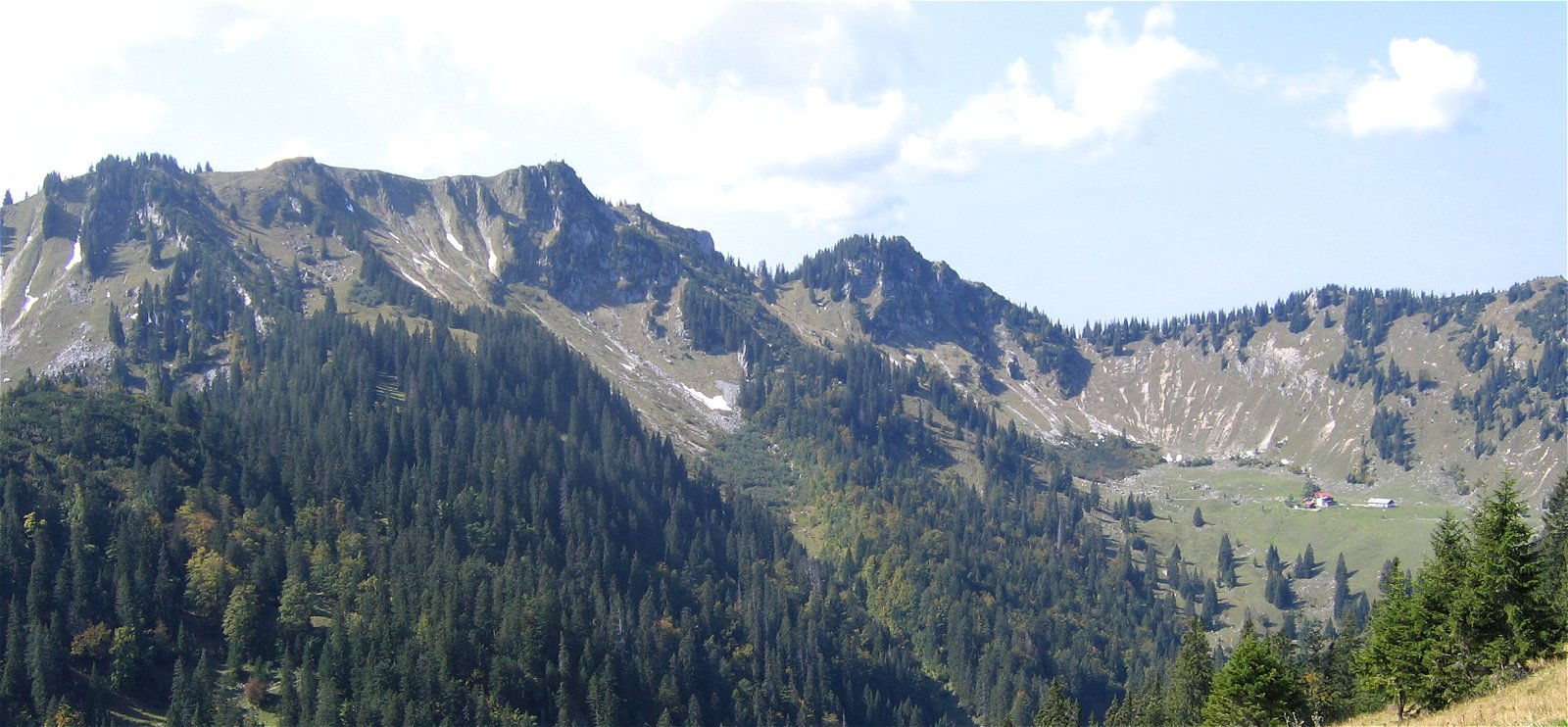
- The Rinnerspitz (right of centre); Left: the Bodenschneid (57 m higher)

Highest point
- Elevation: 1,611 m above sea level (NN) (5,285 ft)
- Coordinates: 47°40′29″N 11°50′02″E

Geography
- Location within Bavaria
- Location: Bavaria, Germany
- Parent range: Schliersee Mountains

Geology
- Rock type(s): Main Dolomite, Plattenkalk

The Rinnerspitz is a 1,611 m high peak in the Schliersee Mountains in the Mangfall mountain range in the German Free State of Bavaria. It is also known by locals as the Peißenberg (not to be confused with the Hoher Peißenberg). It was here on 6 November 1877 that the poacher, Georg Jennerwein, was shot in the back.

The Rinnerspitz lies between the peaks of the 1,668 m high Bodenschneid (430 m to the southeast) and the 1,552 metre high Wasserspitz (653 m north-northeast), in the southern part of the district of Miesbach and, like its neighbours, on the boundary between the parishes of Rottach-Egern in the west and Schliersee in the east. On the arête from the Wasserspitz to the Rinnerspitz, on the north flank of the summit, is the Jennerwein memorial cross. The municipal boundary on these and the other peaks marks the watershed between the Schliersee and the Tegernsee.

The German Alpine Club (DAV) accommodation hut of Bodenschneidhaus on the Rettenböckalm, 500 metres northeast of the Rinnerspitz, is the nearest building. The nearest settlement is the small hamlet of Enterrottach (Rottach-Egern parish), 1.3 km further west on the Valepp Road (Valepp-Straße), which is a toll road from the exit of the hamlet towards Valepp (south). The Spitzingsee lies a good 3 kilometres east, and the border with the Tyrol near the Schinder mountain just under 8 kilometres south (both as the crow flies).
