= Roßkopf (Bavaria) =

Mountain in Bavaria, Germany

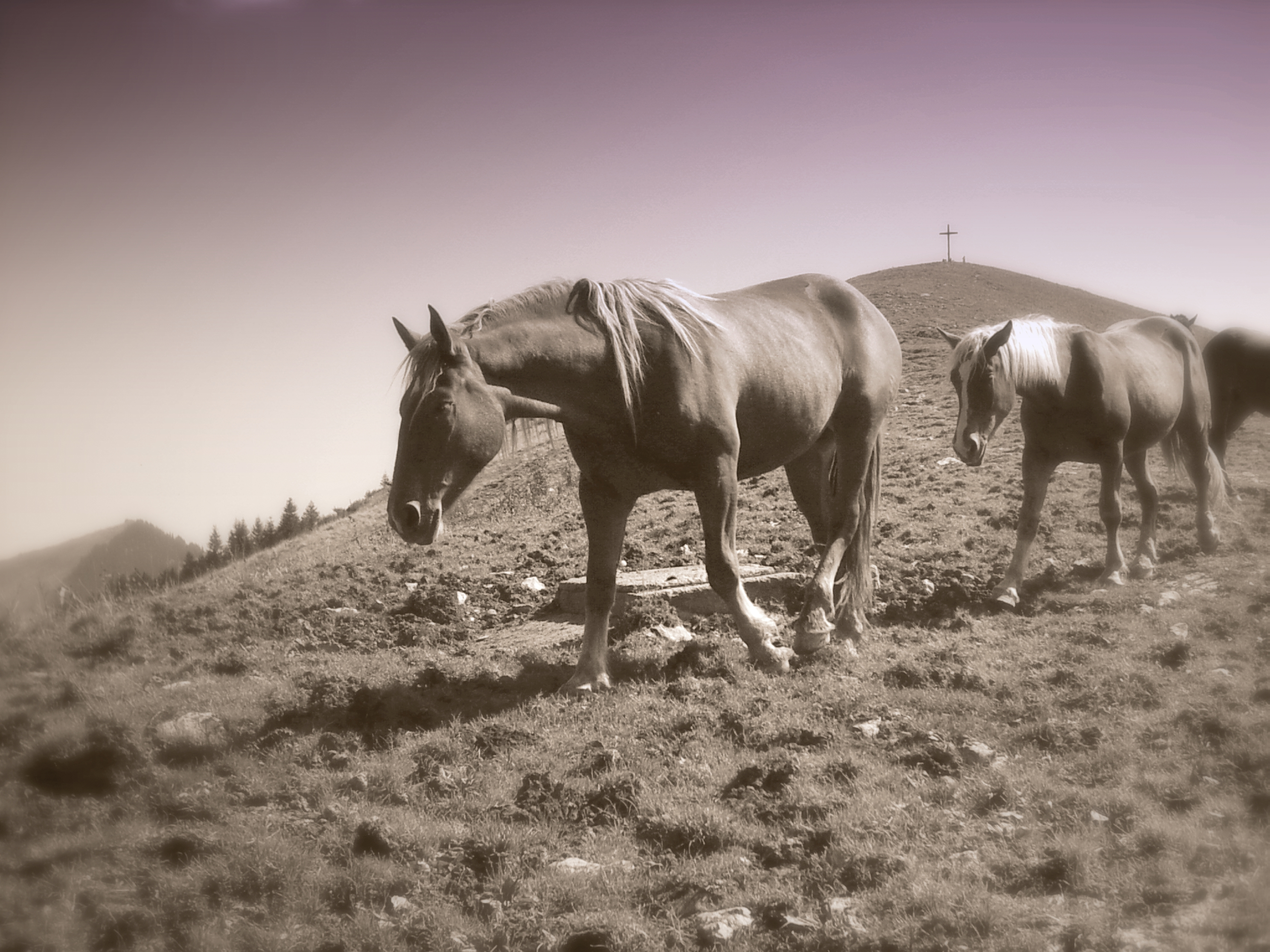
- Horses on the Roßkopf

Highest point
- Elevation: 1,579.9 m (5,183 ft)
- Coordinates: 47°39′24″N 11°51′48″E

Geography
- Location within Bavaria
- Location: Bavaria, Germany
- Parent range: Bavarian Prealps (Mangfall Mountains)

The Roßkopf is a 1,580-metre-high (5,180 ft) peak in the Mangfall Mountains in Upper Bavaria. It lies in the south of the district of Miesbach right on the boundary between the parishes of Schliersee in the east and Rottach-Egern in the west, which forms the watershed between the lakes of Schliersee and Tegernsee. Other peaks on this line are the Bodenschneid and the Rinnerspitz further north.

== Recreation ==
Due to its proximity to Munich, its relatively low height, easy ascents and picturesque location with views of the Spitzingsee and Tegernsee lakes, the Roßkopf is one of the most popular local mountains for Munich families. As a result, its grass-covered summit with its summit cross is often crowded on summer and autumn weekends in fine weather.

=== Snow sports ===
Roßkopf is also a destination for ski mountaineering and powder skiers. A new chair lift links the Roßkopf to the Spitzing ski resort. Snow conditions on the mountain can be variable and dangerous out of season.

In 2022, German national team goalkeeper Manuel Neuer fell while skiing on the southern slope of the Roßkopf and broke his leg.

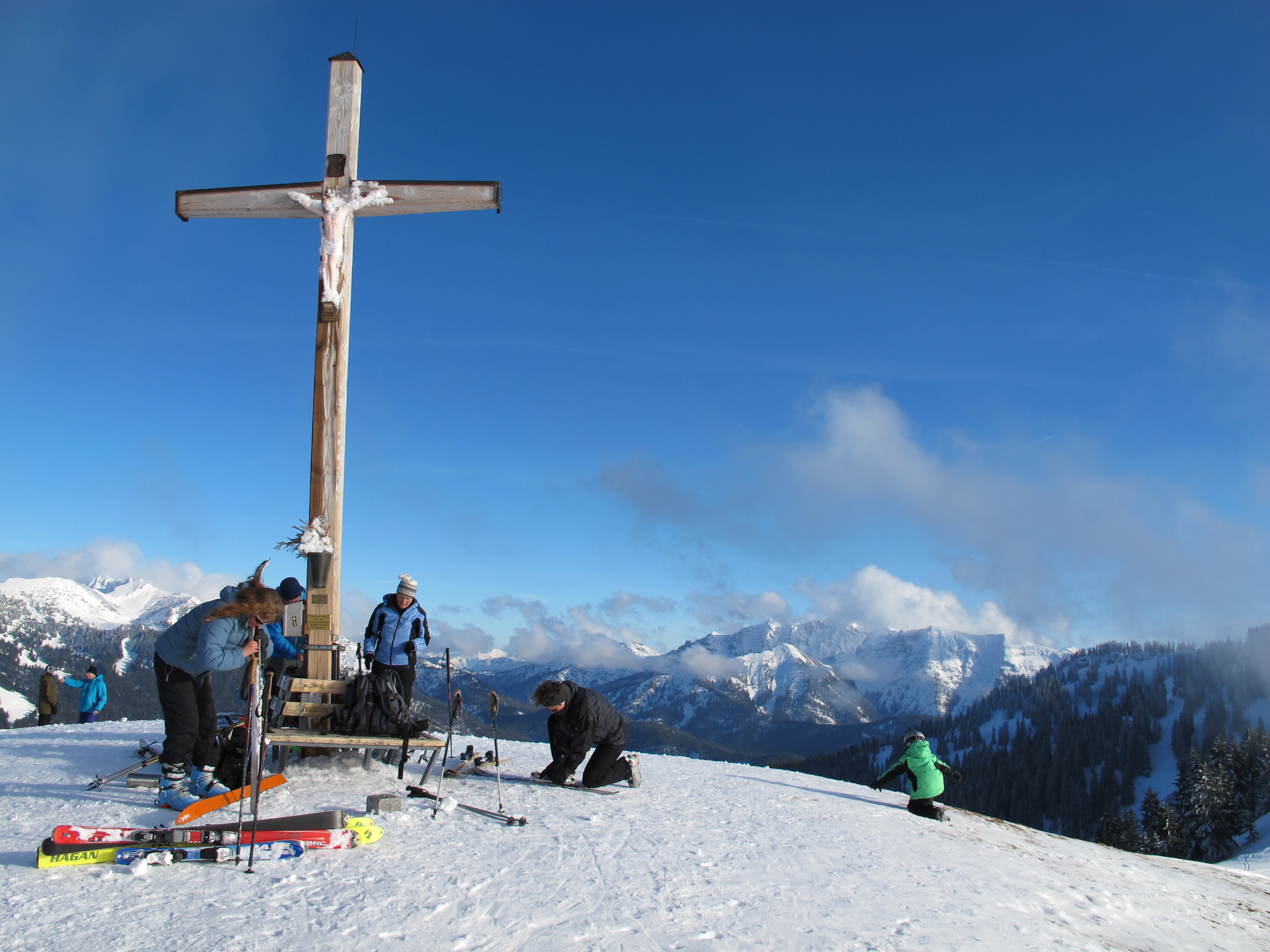
The top of Roßkopf in Winter - In the background on the left is Rotwand and on the right is the Hinteres Sonnwendjoch
