= Bodenschneid =

Mountain in Germany

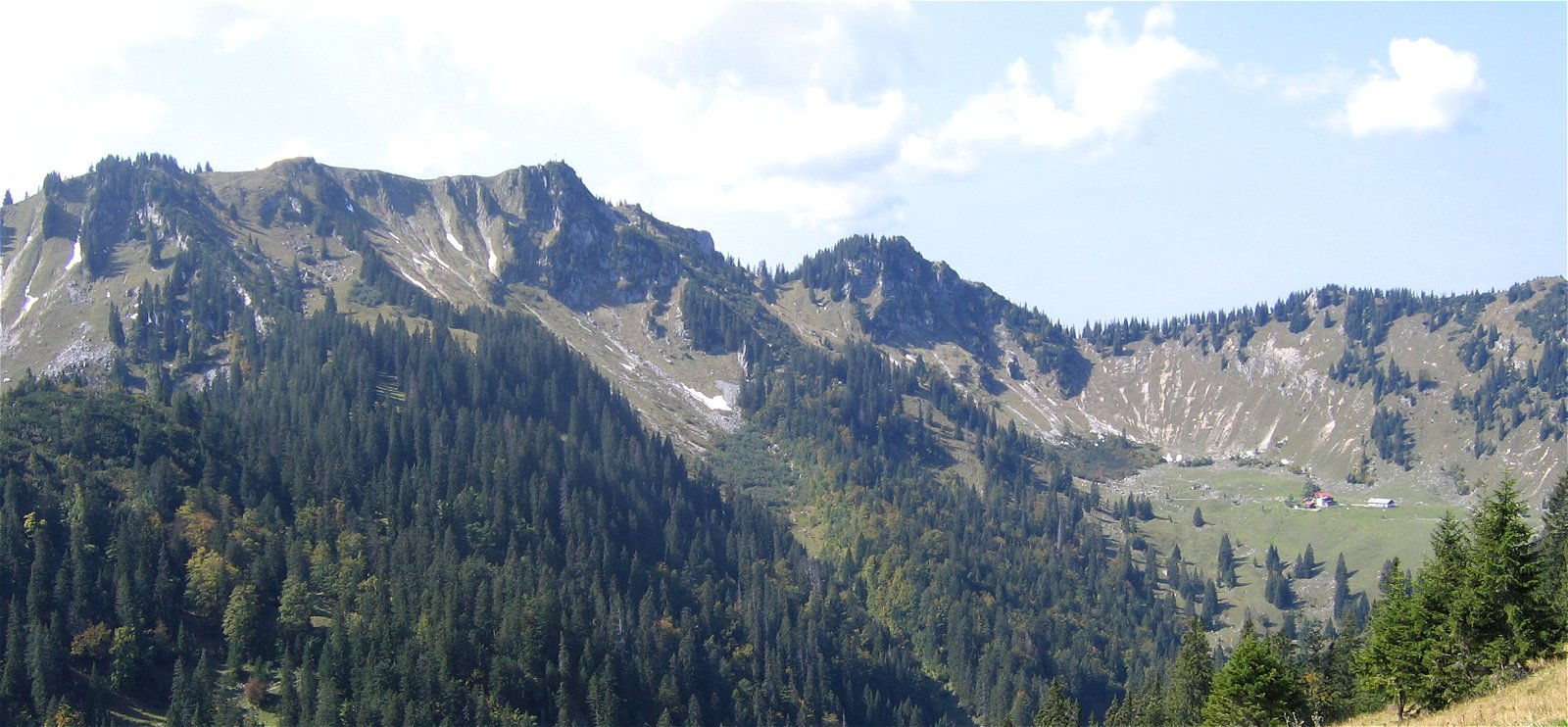
- The Bodenschneid and Bodenschneidhaus (in the bowl to the right)

Highest point
- Elevation: 1,667.7 m (5,471 ft)
- Coordinates: 47°40′19″N 11°50′17″E

Geography
- Location within Bavaria
- Location: Bavaria, Germany
- Parent range: Mangfall Mountains

The Bodenschneid is a 1,668 m high mountain in the Schliersee Mountains in the Mangfall range in the German Free State of Bavaria.

== Location and area ==
The Bodenschneid rises between the lakes of Tegernsee, Schliersee and Spitzingsee and lies in the southern part of the district of Miesbach right on the boundary between the parishes of Kreuth to the west and Schliersee to the east.

The Bodenschneid is long ridge, treeless at the top, with steep crags in the north. Another ridge, the Peißenberg, runs away from the summit to the northwest to the less well-known peaks of Rinnerspitz, Wasserspitz and Rainerkopf.

== Ascent ==
The summit may be reached by foot from Fischhausen-Neuhaus (on the southern shore of Schliersee), from Spitzingsee, from the Suttengebiet (Moni Alm) or from Enterrottach (southeast of Tegernsee, parish of Rottach-Egern). Around 300 m below its highest point is Rettenböck Alm where there is an accommodation hut, Bodenschneidhaus, belonging to the German Alpine Club and which is open all-year round. The shortest ascent, from the Stümpfling (chairlifts from Sutten and Spitzing) over the gently ascending southern ridge, takes an hour.

Even in winter many ski tourers and snowshoe hikers make their way to the top from Fischhausen via the Bodenschneidhaus. This is the classic ascent, running initially through woods to the hut and finally climbing steeply up to the open summit.

== History ==
The poacher, Georg Jennerwein, was shot on the Peißenberg on 6 November 1877.

== Gallery ==
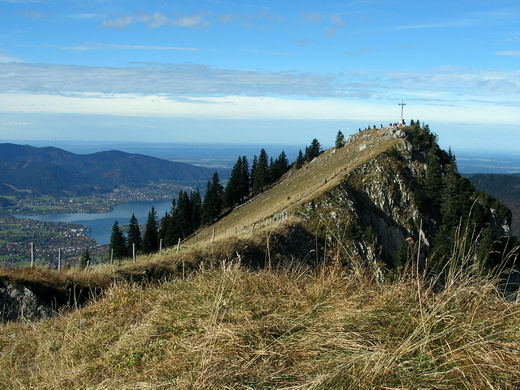
The summit

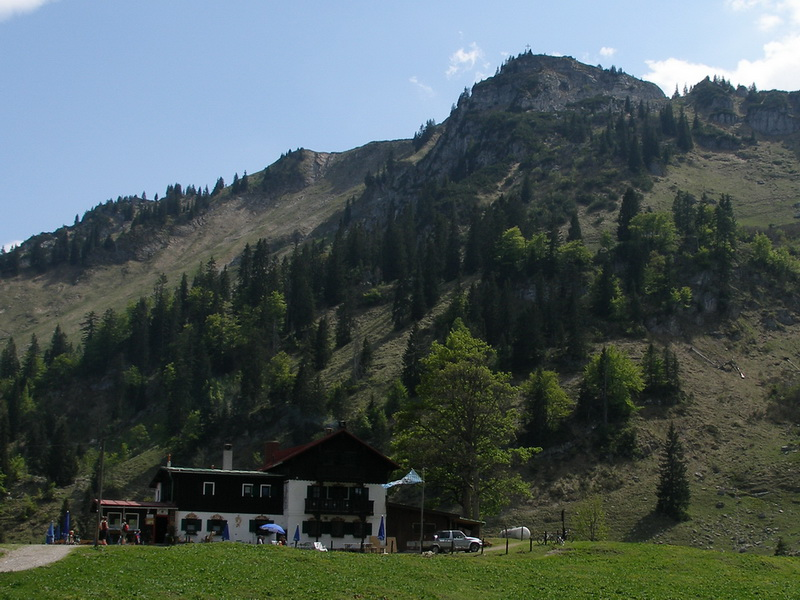
The Bodenschneidhaus and the summit

== Sources ==
- Reinhard Rolle: Hüttenwandern zwischen Garmisch und Berchtesgaden; Edition Förg, Rosenheim; ISBN 978-3-933708-30-4
