= Bayrischzell =

- Municipality
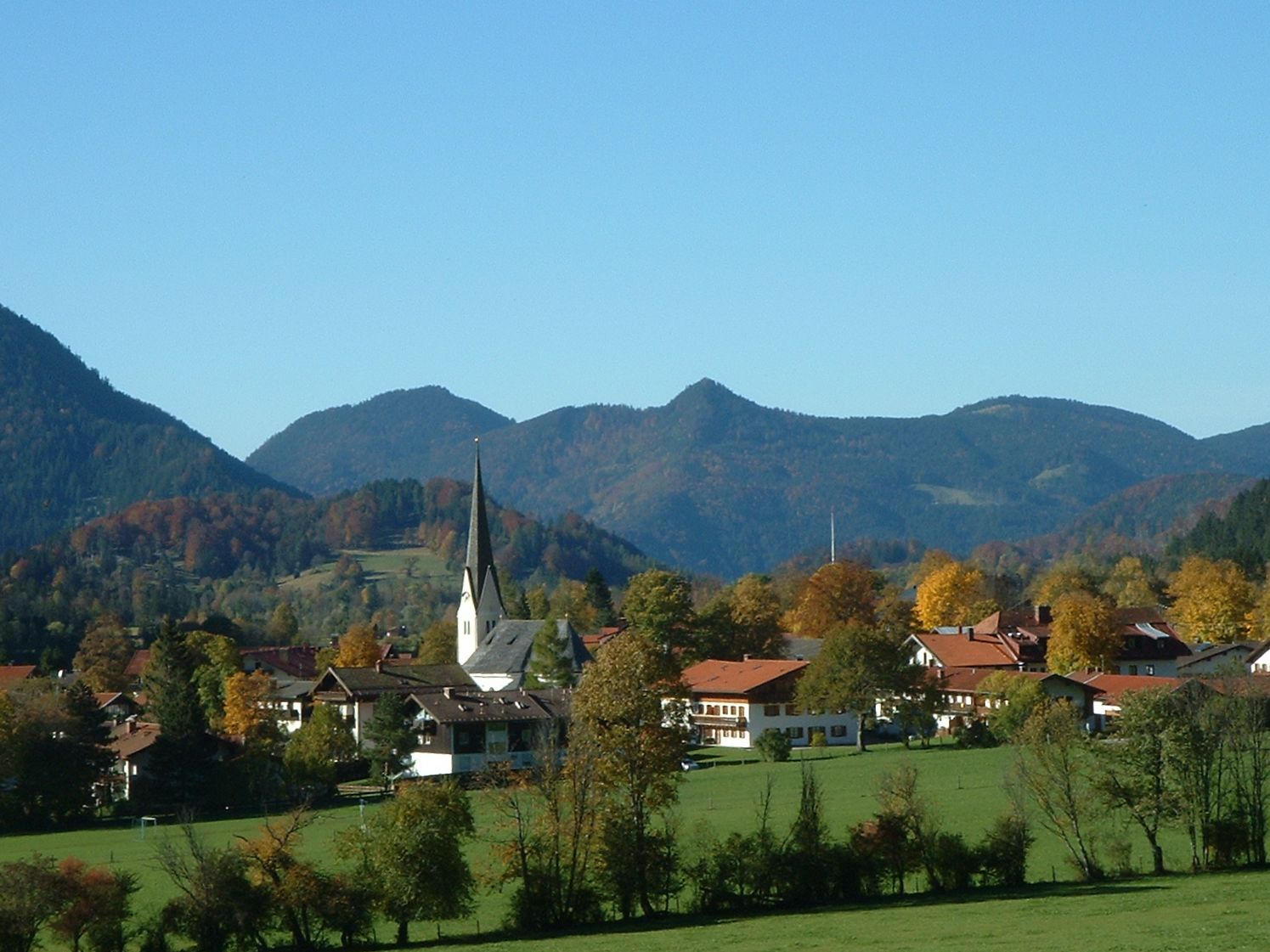
- Bayrischzell

- Coat of arms

- Location of Bayrischzell within Miesbach district
- Interactive map of Bayrischzell
- Location within Germany Location within Bavaria
- Coordinates: 47°40′N 12°01′E
- Country: Germany
- State: Bavaria
- Admin. region: Oberbayern
- District: Miesbach

Government
  - Mayor (2020–26): Georg Kittenrainer (CSU)

Area
  - Total: 79.45 km^{2} (30.68 sq mi)
- Elevation: 800 m (2,600 ft)

Population (2025-12-31)
  - Total: 1,577
  - Density: 19.85/km^{2} (51.41/sq mi)
- Time zone: UTC+01:00 (CET)
  - Summer (DST): UTC+02:00 (CEST)
- Postal codes: 83735
- Dialling codes: 08023
- Vehicle registration: MB
- Website: www.bayrischzell.de

Bayrischzell (German pronunciation: [ˈbaɪʁɪʃˌtsɛl]) is a municipality in the district of Miesbach in Bavaria, Germany.

== Geography ==
Bayrischzell is located in the Mangfallgebirge between Schliersee in the west and Oberaudorf in the east. It is located at the foot of Wendelstein mountain, at the foot of Sudelfeld and below the Sudelfeld pass. It lies at the northern exit of Ursprungtal. It is 23 kilometres (14 mi) southeast of Miesbach, 25 kilometres (16 mi) northwest of Kufstein, 20 kilometres (12 mi) west of Oberaudorf. In the west of the municipality, near the border with the Schliersee municipality, is the Taubensteinhaus at 1,567 metres (5,141 ft) altitude.

== Districts ==
Bayrischzell has 15 designated districts:

- Bäckeralpe
- Bayrischzell
- Dorf
- Geitau
- Hochkreut
- Klarer
- Klarermühl
- Kloo
- Niederhofen
- Noidach
- Osterhofen
- Riedler
- Sudelfeld
- Wendelsteinhaus
- Zipflwirt

== History ==
Between 500 and 700 AD clearings were made in the area of today's municipality. In 1076 a hermitage with Margarethe chapel was founded by Haziga, the wife of Palatine Count Otto II, of Scheyern-Wittelsbach. In 1079 this was converted into a monastery, but by 1085 was moved to Fischbachau. With its proximity to Tyrol, Bayrischzell was the scene of armed conflicts in both the Spanish and Austrian wars of succession and in the Napoleonic Wars and local mountain guard skirmishes with the Tyroleans.

In 1811/12 the cell (or cell Margarethe) was made an independent parish. Since 1832, the town has been officially called Bayrischzell.

On 5/6 December 1846 a "Haberfeldtreiben" took place, with over 100 drivers instead. By 1900 tourism began to take off.

The coat of arms in its current form has existed since 1959, with silver diamonds reminiscent of the close historical relationship with the Wittelsbachs.

From 1900 a railway was constructed along the Leitzachtal, from Munich to Bayrischzell via Westerham. On 1 October 1911, the terminus of the railway Schliersee-Bayrischzell became operational. In 1970 the Wendelstein Cable Car was completed.

== Other ==
The German University Sports Association (Arbeitsgemeinschaft deutscher Sportreferenten) was established in 1948 in Bayrischzell even before the constitution of the Federal Republic on 2 April 1948 in Bayrischzell.

On the night of 26 June 2006 on the 1,500-metre-high (4,900 ft) Kümpflalm near Rotwand, the brown bear Bruno was killed by two hunters and a policeman by a lung shot at 150 metres (490 ft). He had come from Italy via Tyrol in May 2006. The stuffed bear has been displayed since April 2008 in Museum of Man and Nature.

According to a survey by the ATS (Alpenregion Tegernsee Schliersee), Bayrischzell is the most liveable town in the district of Miesbach

In autumn 2007, director Rainer Kaufmann filmed the television movie The best comes first for ZDF. In the 1980s Heirs to be learned was filmed in Bayrischzell.

== Leisure and Sports facilities ==
The adjoining Sudelfeld with 19 ski lifts and around 31 kilometres (19 mi) of prepared ski runs is one of the most famous ski resorts in the Bavarian Alps and one of the largest in the German contiguous ski area. It can be reached from the village on a chairlift. Wendelstein can be reached by a cable car from Osterhofen since 1970. The Wendelstein ski resort with its 10 kilometres (6.2 mi) of slopes is a secret tip for experienced skiers.

On the edge of the village is the heated open air swimming pool, "Alpenfreibad Bayrischzell".

There are also tennis courts, a mini golf course and in winter an ice rink and a curling rink.

In Geitau, on the western edge of the municipality, lies the Geitau gliding airfield, operated by LSC Schliersee.

=== DSV Nordic active center ===
During winter, 96 kilometres (60 mi) of groomed trails are available for cross-country skiing. In Summer there are 28 kilometres (17 mi) of marked Nordic walking trails.

== Culture and notable items ==
- Pfarrkirche St. Margareth, built in 1733, with many works of art by local painters.

== Personalities ==
=== Born in Bayrischzell ===
- Rolf Langenfass (1944–2012), costume and set designer
- Felix von Manteuffel (born 1945), actor
- Alexander Vogelgsang (born 1944), politician (SPD)

=== Other personalities related to Bayrischzell ===
- Ida zur Nieden (1886–1981), vocalist, died there

== Images ==
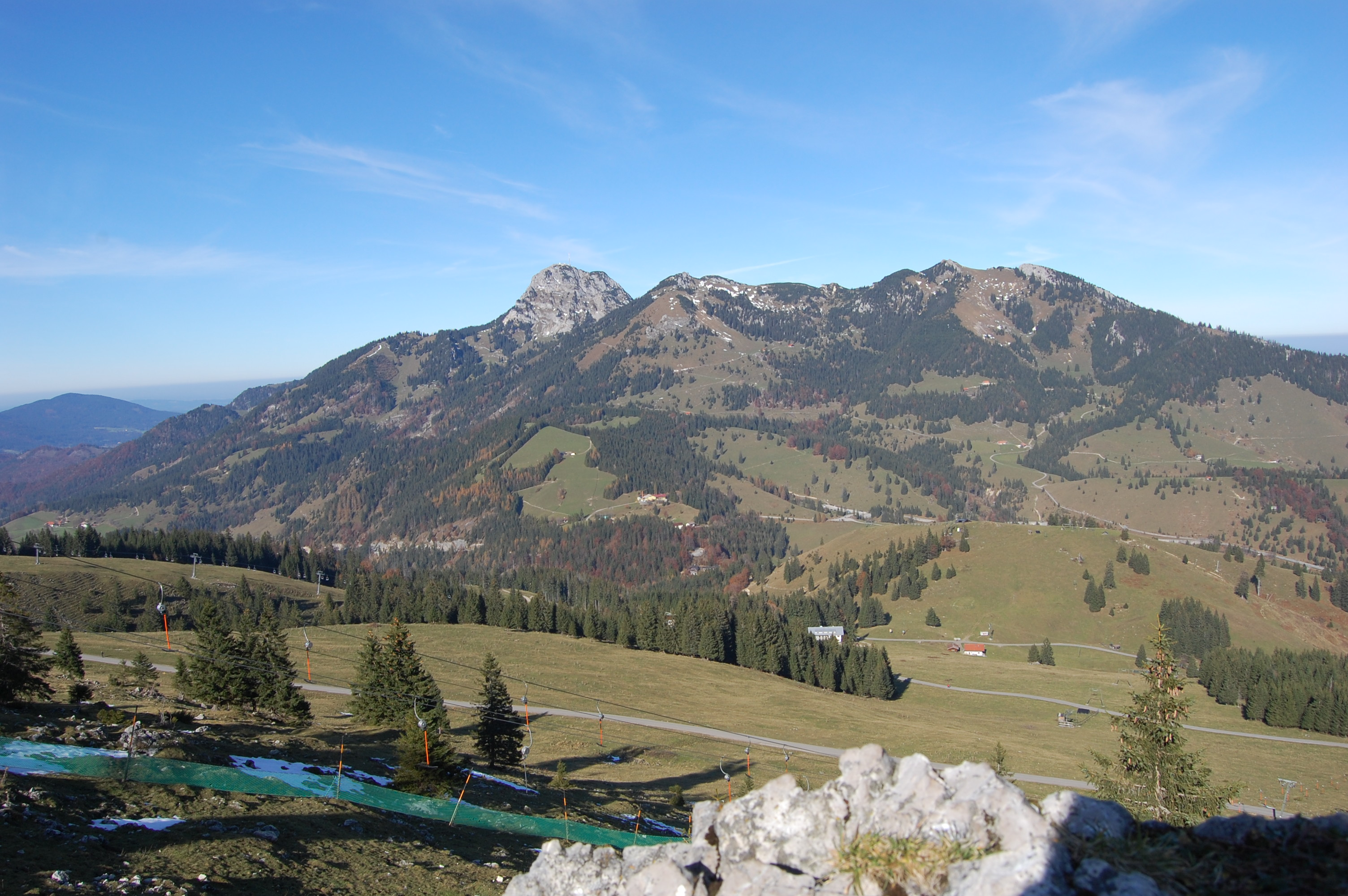
View from Sudelfeld towards Wendelstein

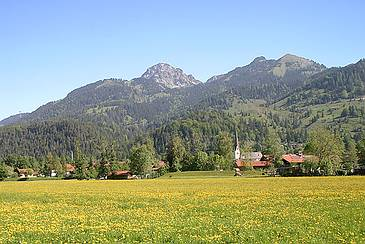
Bayrischzell

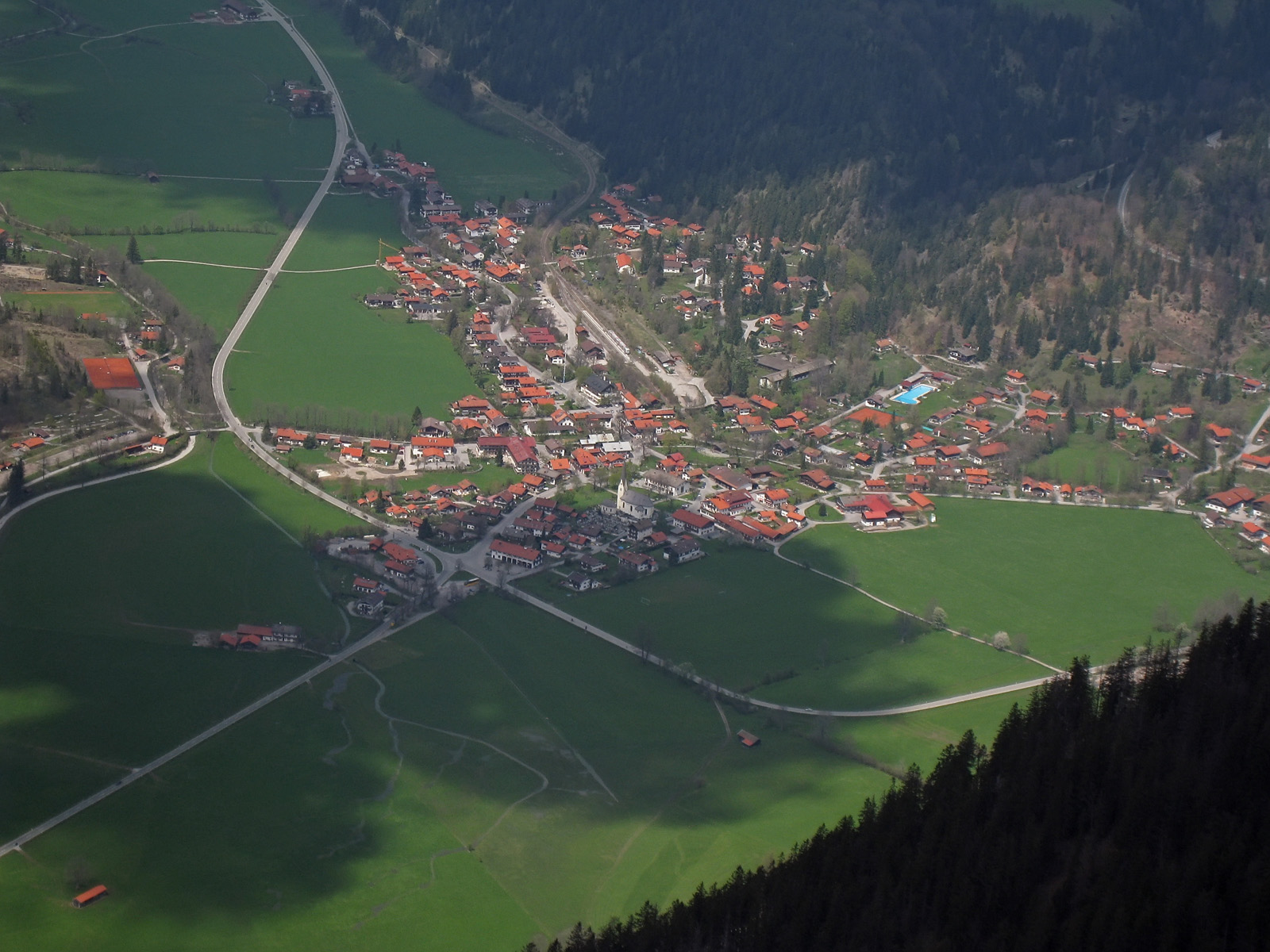
Bayrischzell aerial photo

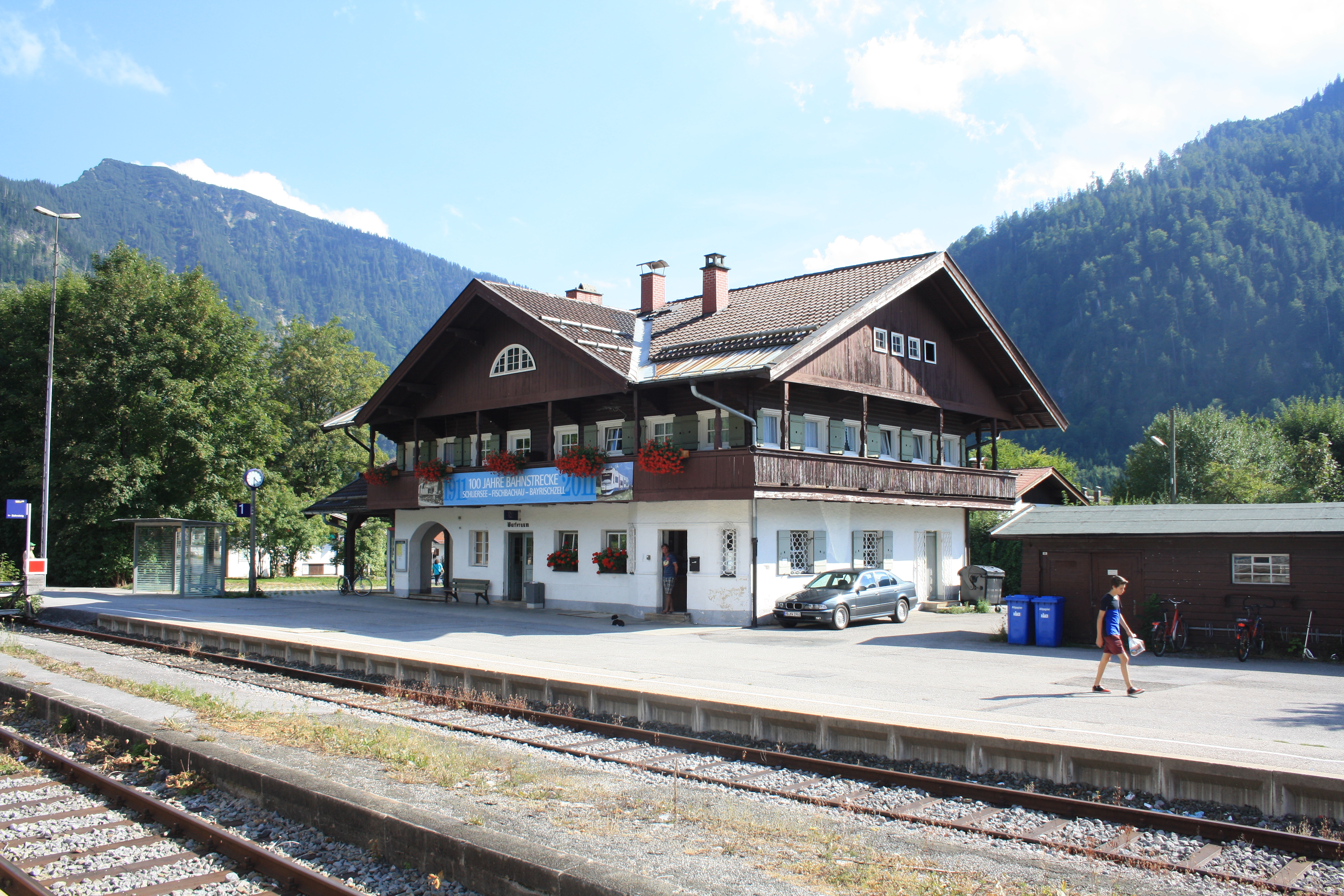
Bayrischzell train station
