= Schliersee Mountains =

Mountain range in Germany

The Schliersee Mountains (German: Schlierseer Berge) are a part of the Mangfall Mountains in the Bavarian Prealps around the lakes of the Schliersee and the Spitzingsee. The Rotwand, at 1,884 m, is the highest and best-known summit in the group. In summer and winter it is one of the most popular tourist destinations in the Bavarian Prealps. From the valley station of the Taubenstein Cable Car, the Rotwand can be climbed in just under 1½ hours and this route is thus very busy. The longer climbs e.g. from the Leitzach valley are, by contrast, quieter.

The watershed between the lakes of Schliersee and Tegernsee crosses the mountains and forms the municipal boundary between the parishes of Rottach-Egern in the west and Schliersee in the east. The boundary summits from north to south as far as Valepp are:

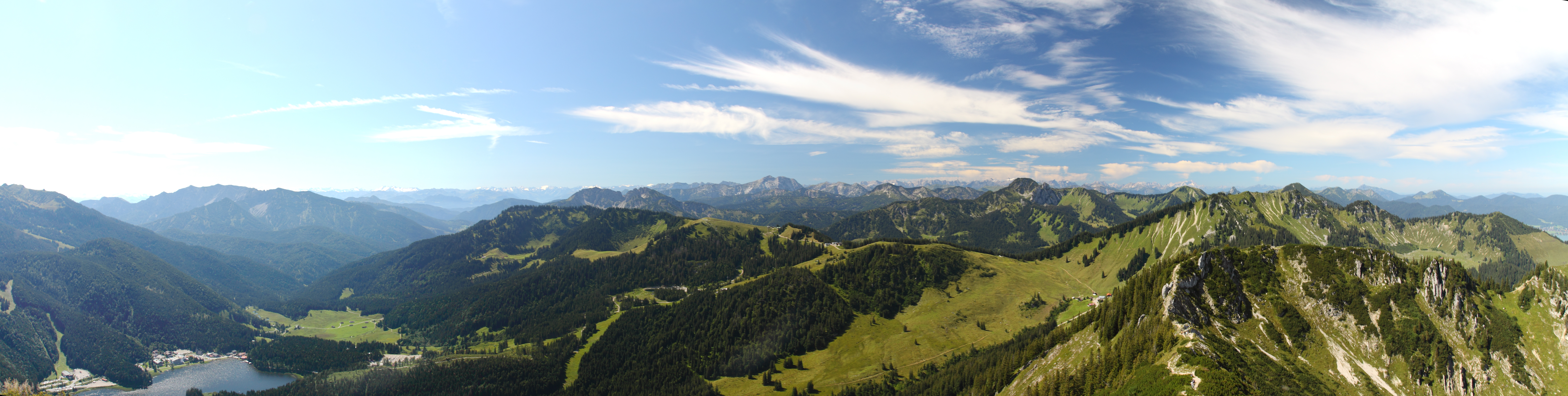
Panorama of the Spitzingsee region with the Spitzingsee, Stolzenberg (centre), Stümpfling (centre right) and Bodenschneid (right)

- Rainerkopf (1,463.3 m)
- Wasserspitz (1,552 m)
- Rinnerspitz (1,611 m)
- Bodenschneid (1,667.3 m)
- Suttenstein (1,398 m)
- Stümpfling (1,506.2 m)
- Roßkopf (1,579.9 m)
- Rotkopf (1,602 m)
- Stolzenberg (1,609.1 m)
- Lämmeralpeneck (1,224 m)
- Schalmeiereck (1,098 m)
