= Rotwand (Bavaria) =

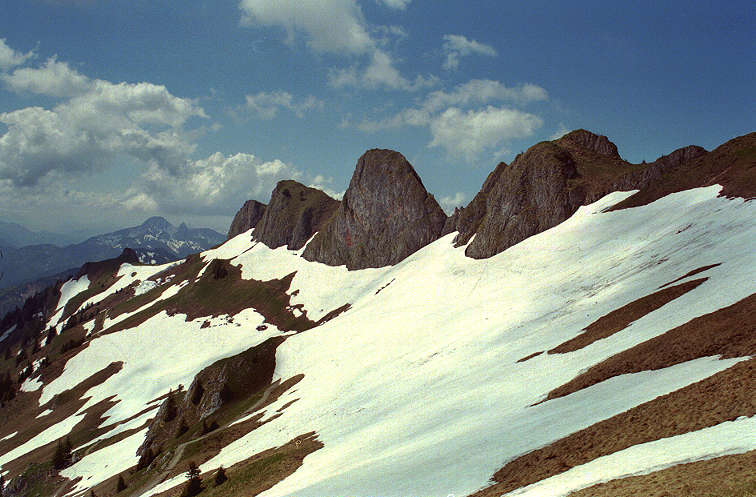
- The rocks near the summit that give the Rotwand its name

Highest point
- Elevation: 1,884 m above sea level (NN) (6,181 ft)
- Prominence: 741 m (2,431 ft)
- Coordinates: 47°39′03″N 11°56′07″E

Geography
- Location within Bavaria
- Location: Bavaria, Germany
- Parent range: Mangfall Mountains (Schliersee Mountains)

Geology
- Rock age: Triassic
- Mountain type(s): Limestones (Plattenkalk, Liasbasiskalk and Oberrätkalk

Climbing
- Easiest route: Spitzingsee – Taubenstein – Rotwandhaus – Rotwand

The Rotwand ("Red Wall") is a 1,884 m high peak in the Mangfall Mountains in Bavaria, the highest summit in the Spitzingsee region and one of the most popular of Munich's local mountains (Hausberge). The summit may be reached in an easy hike from the lake of Spitzingsee on various routes (e. g. through the Pfanngraben gorge with its picturesque whirlpools). The summit can be attained even more easily from the nearby mountain station on the Taubenstein and, as a result, can often become rather overcrowded on summer's days.

Alternatively the top can be climbed from Geitau via the lake of Soinsee. Below the summit, at a height of 1,737 m, is the mountain hut of Rotwandhaus.

In winter the Rotwand is frequently climbed by skiers. The classic Rotwand-Reib’n runs from the Spitzingsee to the Rotwand, then over the Kümpflscharte arête (1,695 m) to the Auerspitz summit (1,811 m), continuing via the alpine pasture of Großtiefentalalm (1,500 m), the Miesing saddle (1,704 m; with detours to the Hochmiesing), Kleintiefentalalm and Taubensteinhaus and back to the Spitzingsee. This tour is also possible with snowshoes.

The "problem bear", JJ1 (also known as Bruno), was believed to be the first wild bear on German soil for 170 years. He was declared a threat to humans and killed on 26 June 2006 around 4.50 am in the Rotwand area after he had been seen at the Rotwandhaus.

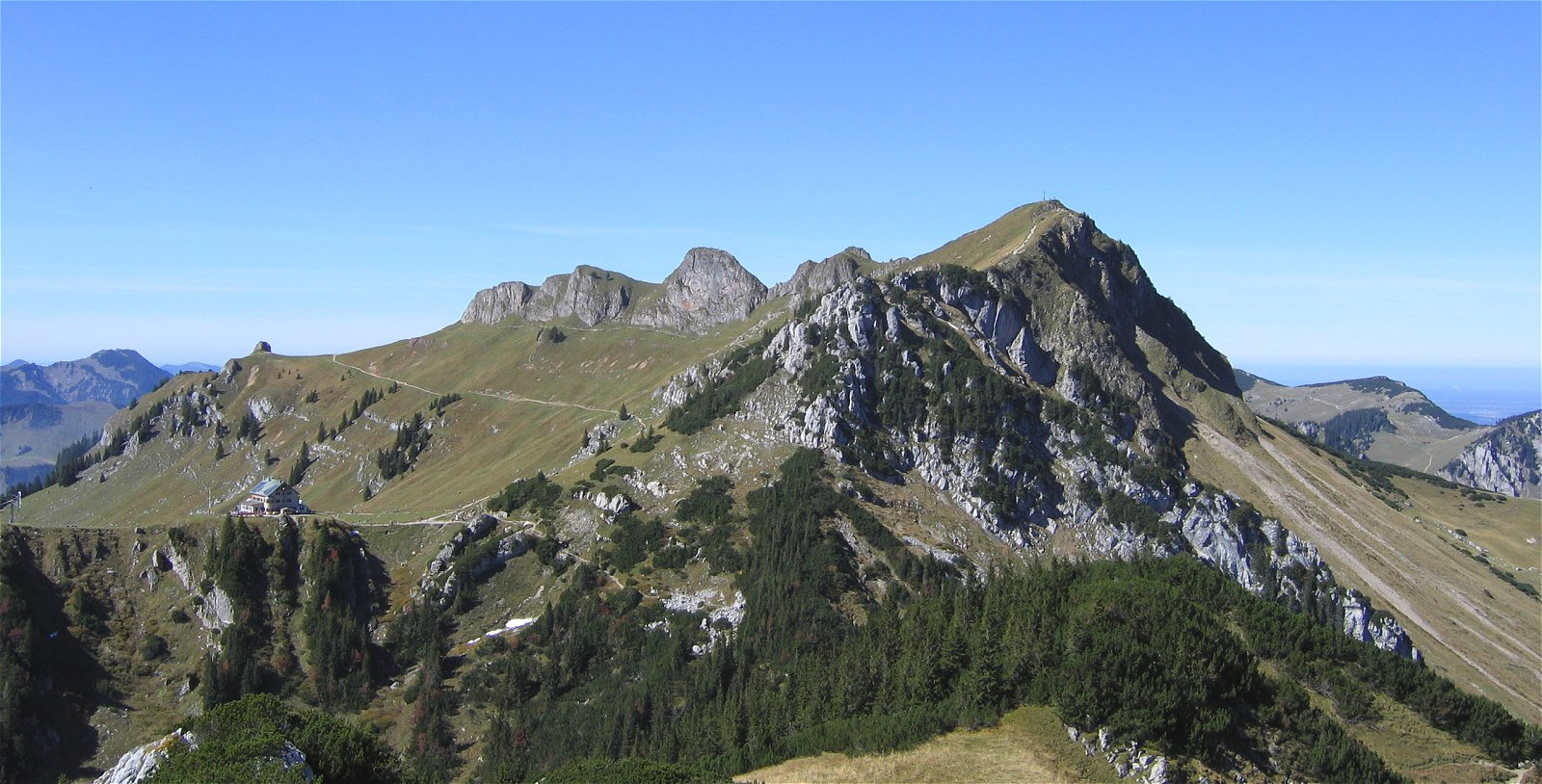
The Rotwand from the Auerspitz

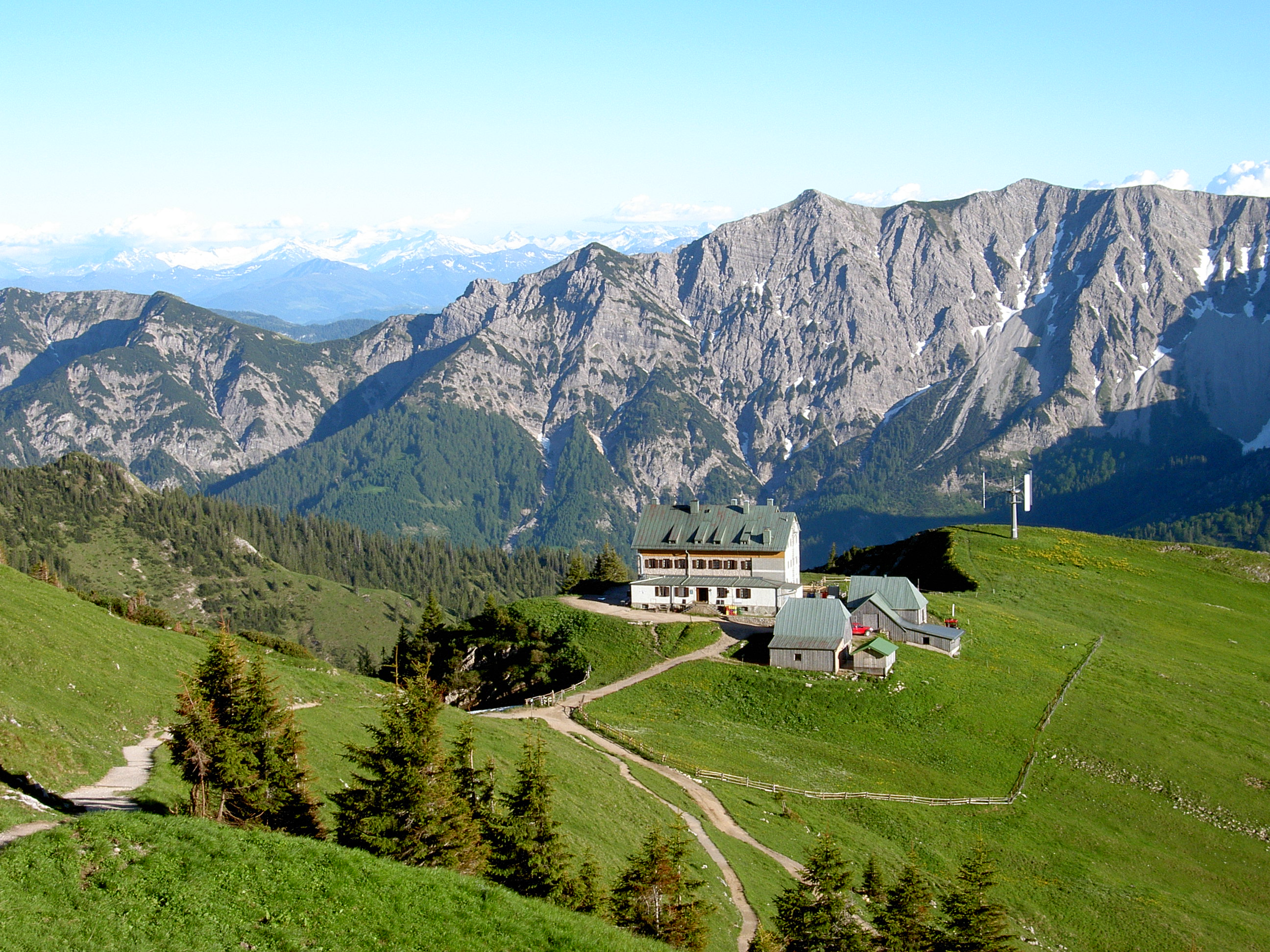
The Rotwandhaus – view from the path to the Rotwand summit

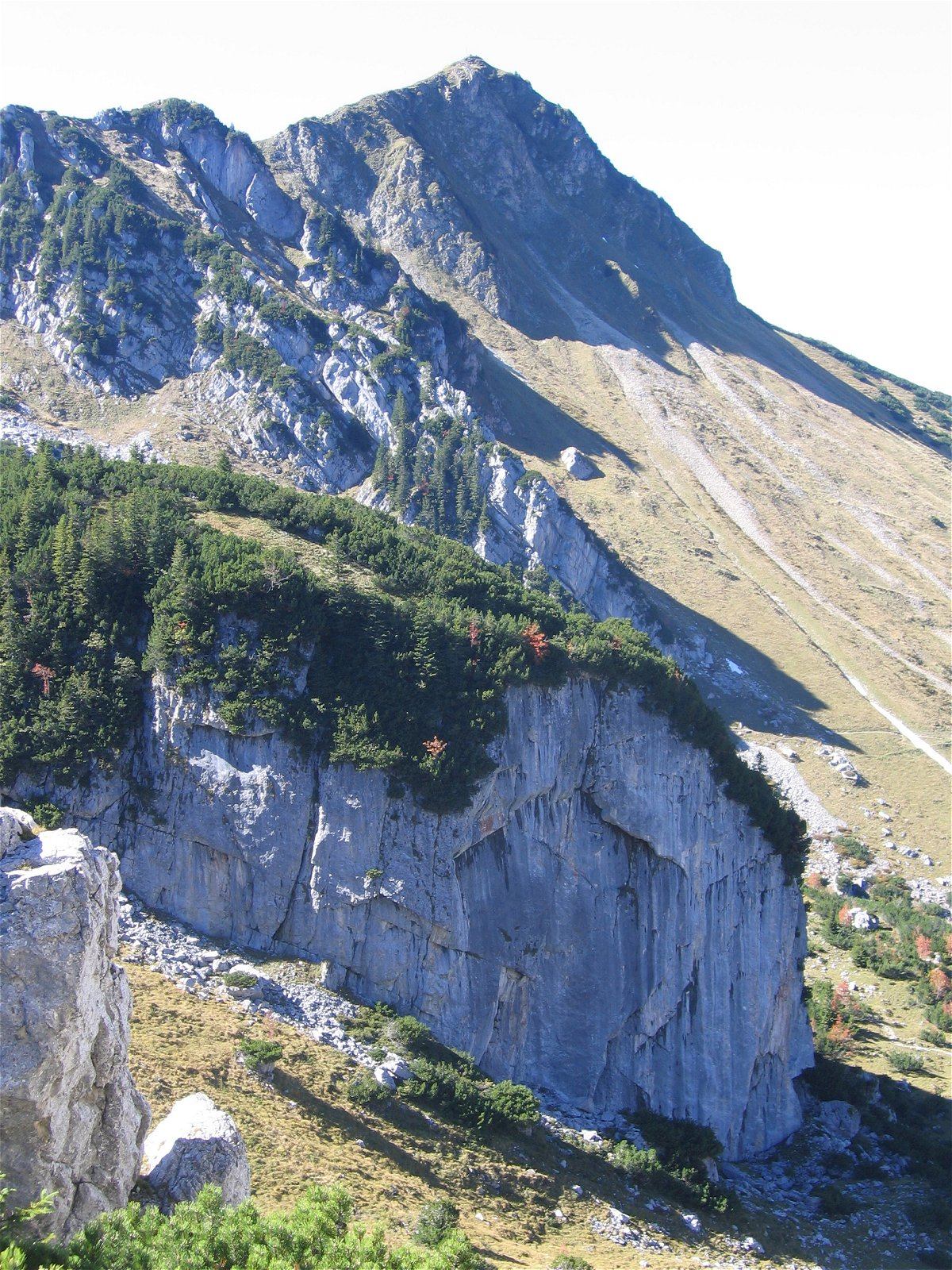
The Rotwand seen from the Auerspitz
