= Brecherspitz =

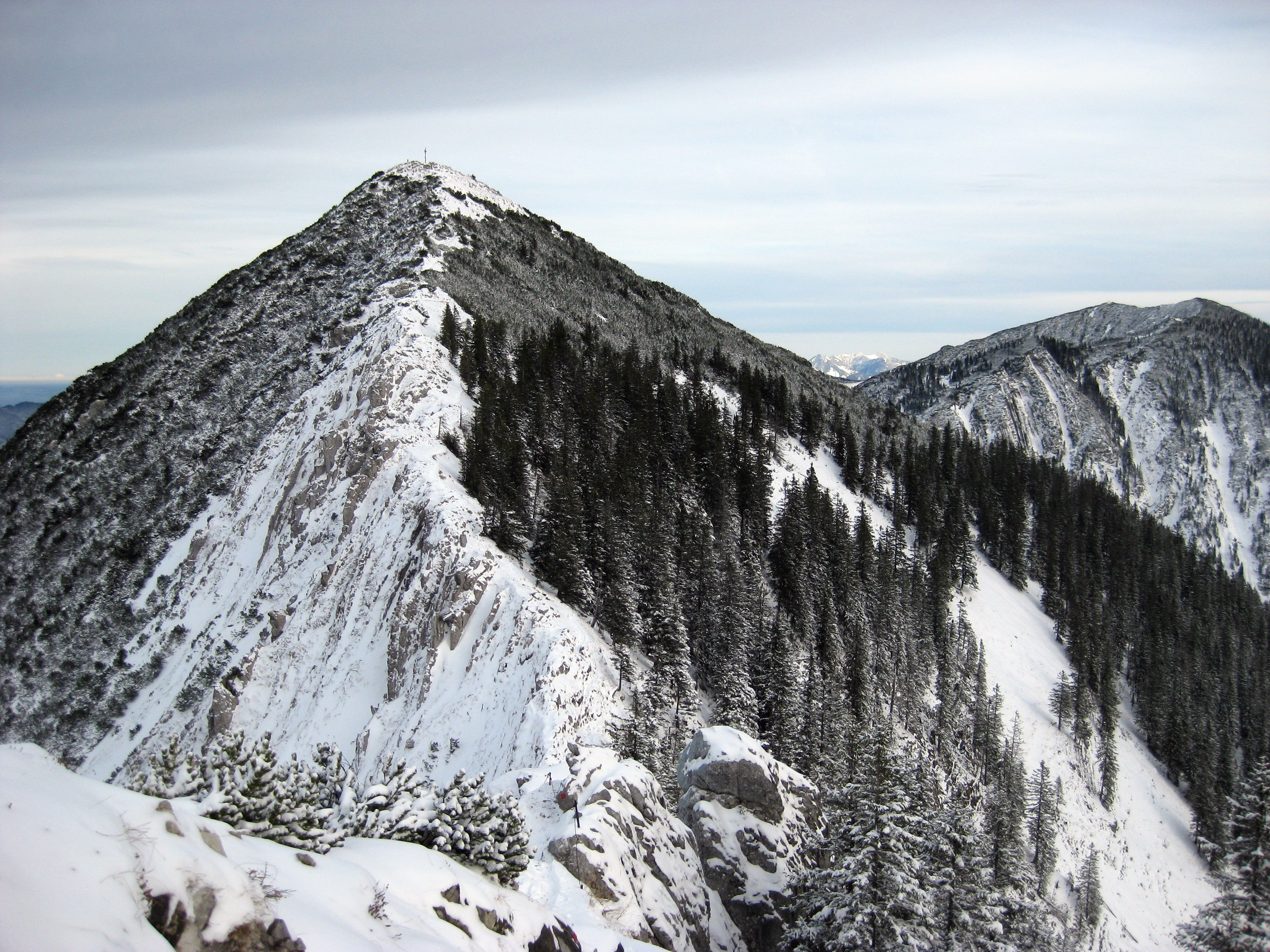
- The summit of the Brecherspitz from the south

Highest point
- Elevation: 1,683 m above sea level (NN) (5,522 ft)
- Coordinates: 47°40′38″N 11°52′21″E

Geography
- Location within Bavaria
- Location: Bavaria, Germany
- Parent range: Mangfall Mountains (Schliersee Mountains)

Climbing
- Easiest route: Spitzingsattel – Obere Firstalm – Freudenreichsattel – Brecherspitz

The Brecherspitz is a mountain in Bavaria, Germany. It is about 18 minutes from nearby towns of Fischbachau and Schliersee. From the top, you can see views of small lake Spitzingsee, Miesbach District, and Austrian Border.

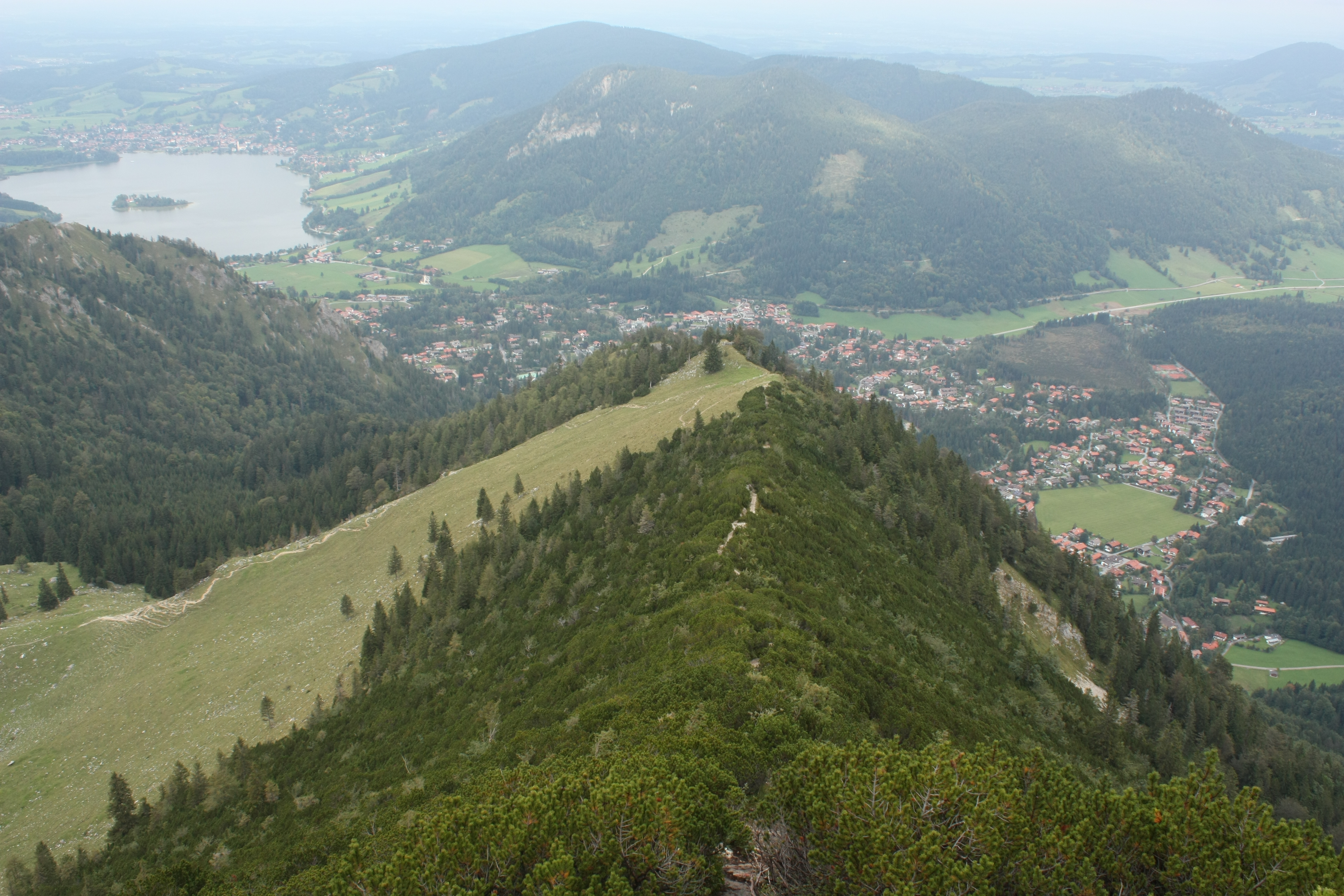
View from the top

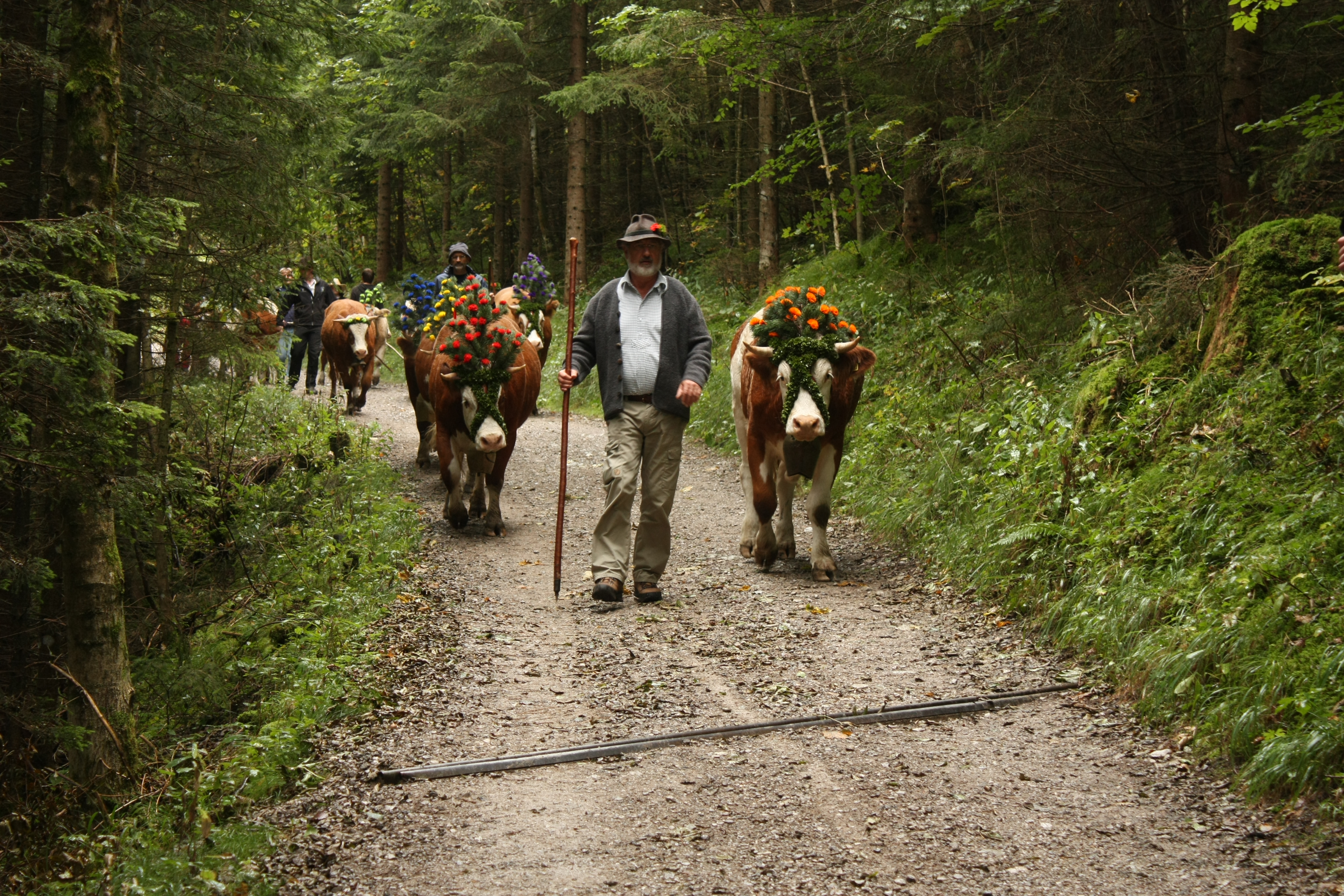
Cows being brought down from the mountains

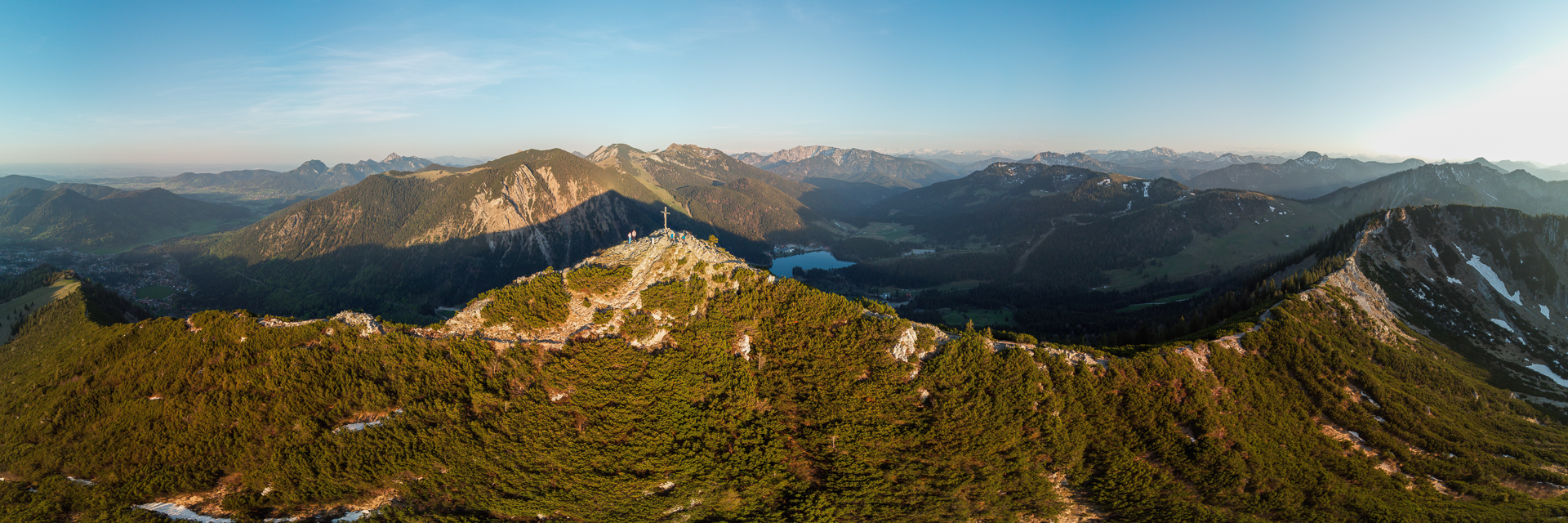
Brecherspitz shortly before sunset
