= Trainsjoch =

Mountain in Austria and Germany

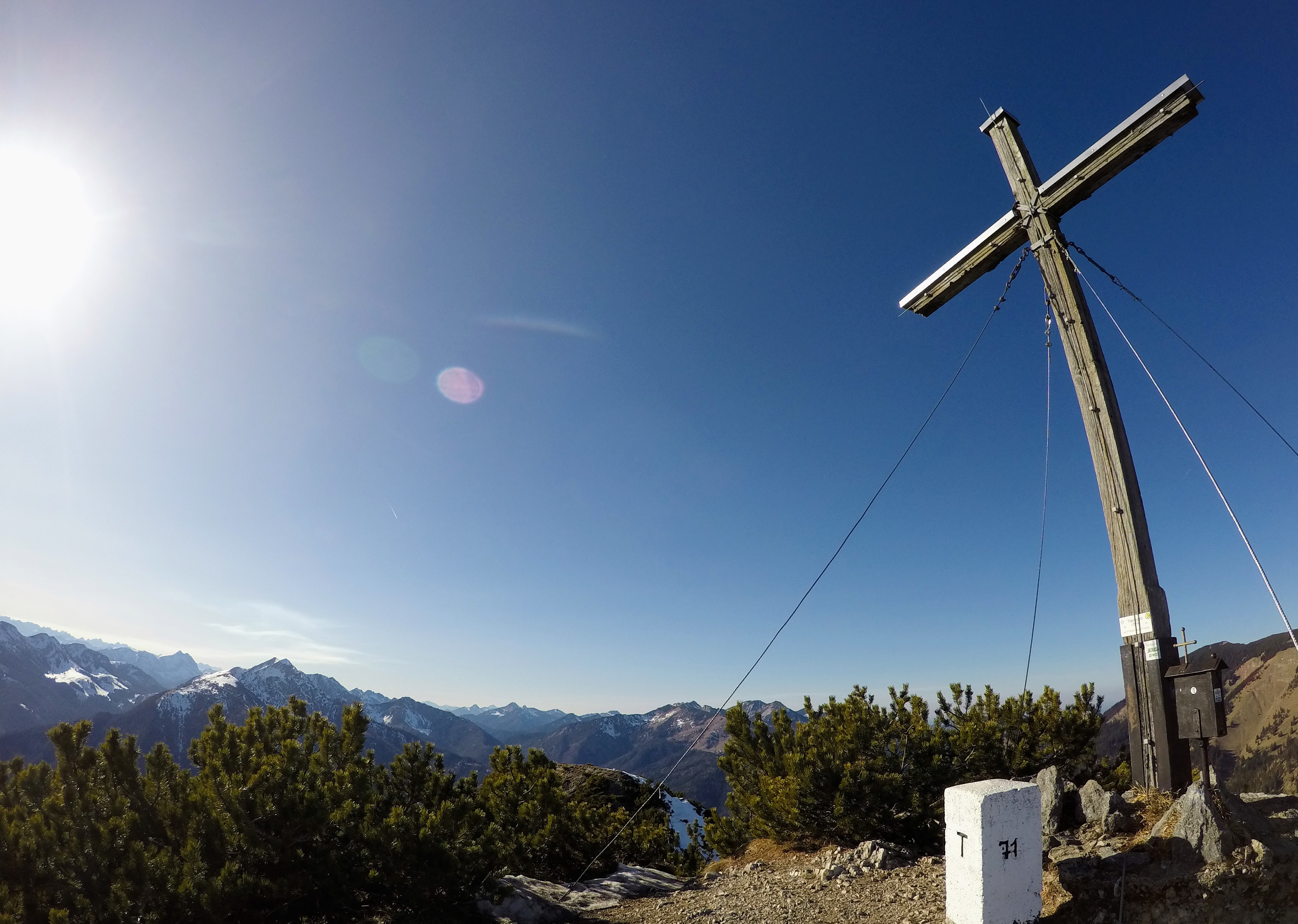
- Summit cross of Trainsjoch

Highest point
- Elevation: 1,708 m (AA) (5,604 ft)
- Prominence: 443 m
- Isolation: 3.08 km → Unterberger Joch
- Coordinates: 47°36′55″N 12°03′16″E

Geography
- Location within Austria
- Location: Tyrol, Austria
- Parent range: Mangfall Mountains, Bavarian Prealps

Trainsjoch is a mountain on the border between Austrian state of Tyrol and German state of Bavaria. The 1,708 m (AA) high mountain is part of the Mangfall range, a subdivision of the Bavarian Prealps.

It is a popular hiking destination, there are good views from the top into the range of the Wilder Kaiser to the East.
