= Stümpfling =

Mountain in Germany

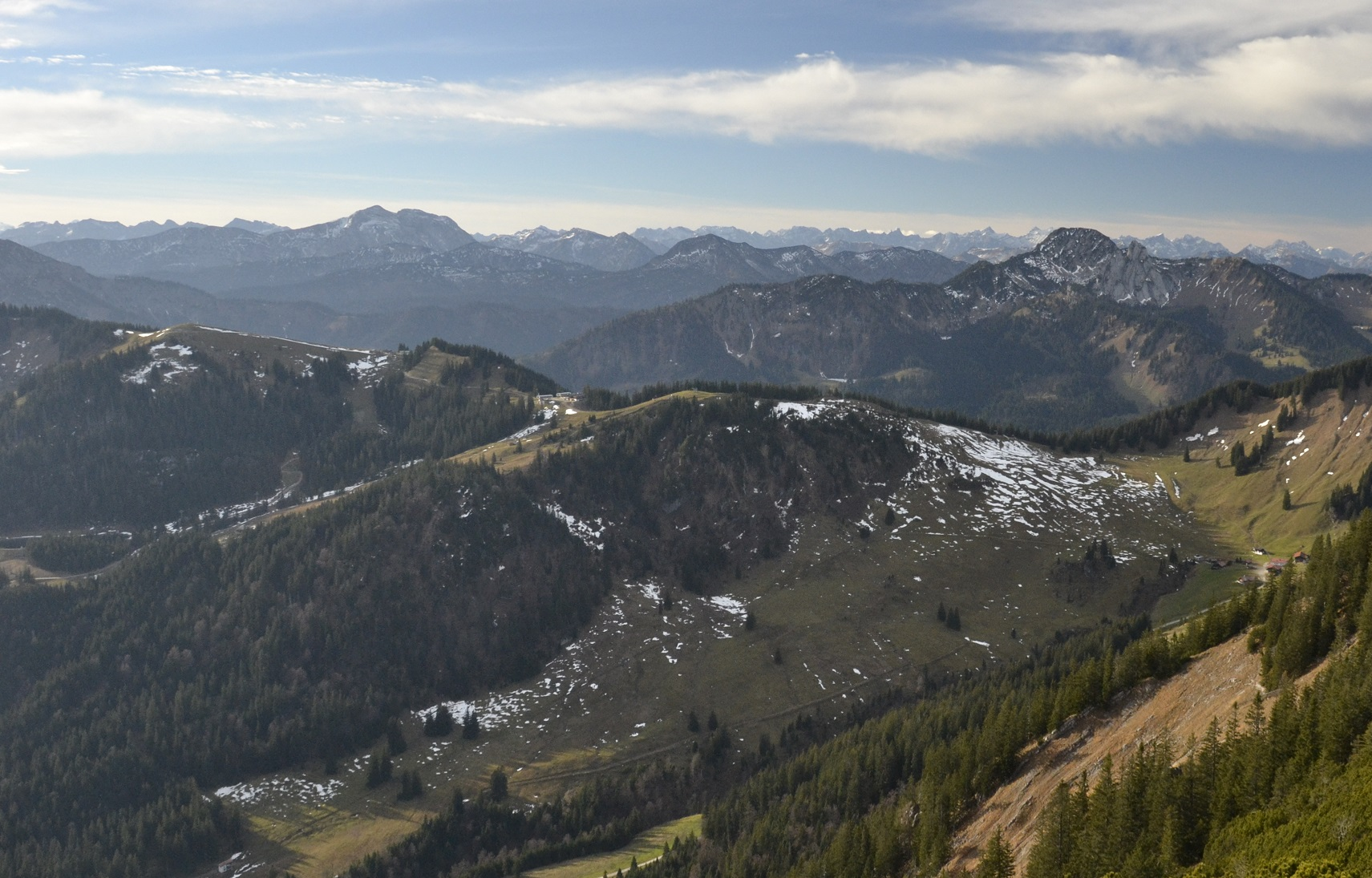

Highest point
- Elevation: 1,506 m above sea level (NN) (4,941 ft)
- Coordinates: 47°39′44″N 11°51′23″E

Geography
- Location within Bavaria
- Location: Bavaria, Germany
- Parent range: Mangfall Mountains

Climbing
- Normal route: from the Spitzing Saddle

The Stümpfling is a mountain, 1,506 metres high, in the Bavarian Prealps. The mountain is an easy mountain walk from the Spitzingsee lake or from the Wildbach Hut. The Suttenbahn and Stümpflingbahn lifts run up the mountain to just below the summit.

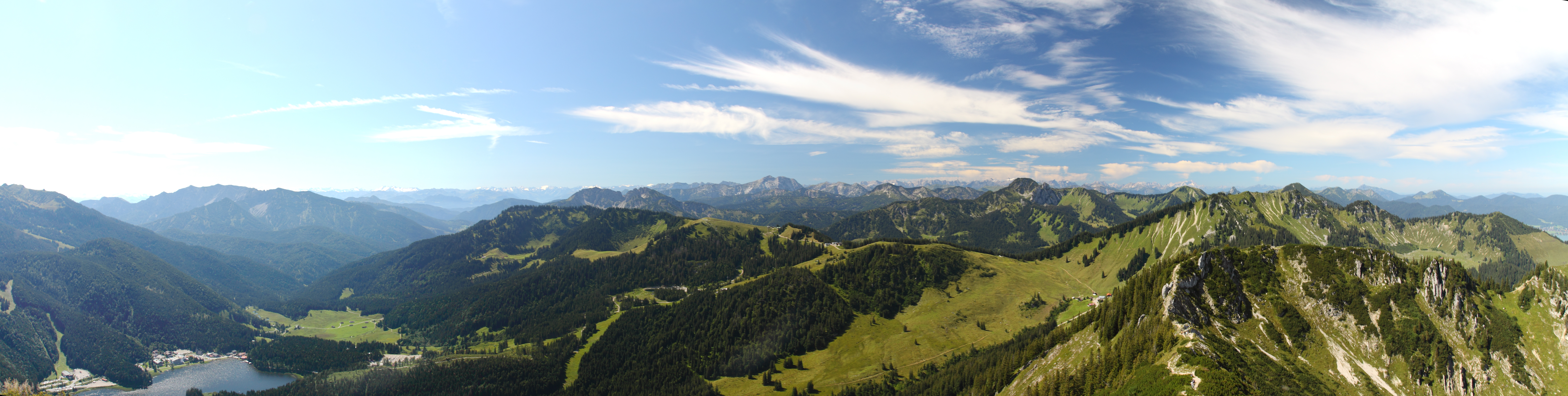
Panorama of the Spitzingsee region with the Spitzingsee, Stolzenberg (centre), Stümpfling (centre right) and Bodenschneid (right)
