= Mangfall Mountains =

Mountain range in Germany

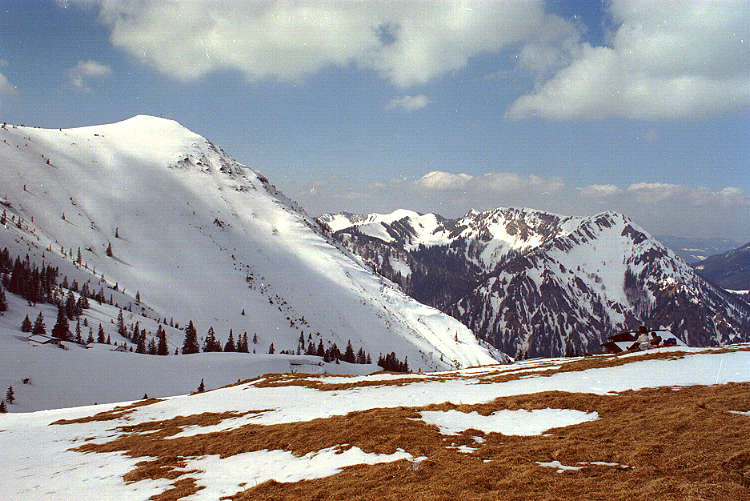
- The summit of the Hirschberg. Foreground: the Kampen, Tegernsee Mountains

Highest point
- Peak: Rotwand
- Elevation: 1,884 m above NN

Dimensions
- Area: 752.40 km^{2} (290.50 mi^{2})

Geography
- Location within Alps
- Country: Germany
- State: Bavaria
- Range coordinates: 47°39′03″N 11°56′07″E
- Parent range: Bavarian Prealps

The Mangfall Mountains (German: Mangfallgebirge，pronounced [ˈmaŋfalɡəˌbɪʁɡə]), or sometimes Mangfall Alps, are the easternmost part of the Bavarian Prealps that, in turn, belong to the Northern Limestone Alps. The name comes from the river Mangfall, whose tributaries, the Rottach, Weißach, Schlierach and Leitzach, drain large parts of the area and form an important drinking water reservoir for the city of Munich.

== Geography ==
=== Location ===
The mountain region is bounded by the Isar valley in the west, the Inn valley in the east, the Brandenberg Alps (the Rofan) and the Austrian state border in the south. North of the Mangfalls lies the Alpine Foreland. The region has an area of 752.40 km^{2} or, by narrower definitions, only 333 km^{2}.

The Mangfall Mountains are divided into the Tegernsee Mountains (from the Isar to the line Tegernsee−Rottach−Weiße Valepp), Schliersee Mountains (to the Leitzach valley) and the Wendelstein Group (between the Leitzach glacial valley and the Inn valley).

=== Peaks ===
The highest peak in the Mangfalls is the Rotwand at 1.884 m above sea level (NN), one of the most popular local mountains for Munich's citizens at all times of the year. The Wendelstein lies a few kilometres further northeast of the Rotwand, but is separated from it by a valley. Another popular destination is the Brünnstein.

These and the other main peaks in the Mangfall Mountains are (sorted by height in metres (m) above Normalnull (NN):

- Rotwand (1.884 m), Miesbach district
- Großer Traithen (1.852 m), Rosenheim district
- Wendelstein (1.838 m), Rosenheim district
- Risserkogel (1.826 m), Miesbach district
- Schinder (1.808 m), Miesbach district
- Ruchenköpfe (1.805 m), Miesbach district
- Plankenstein (1.768 m), Miesbach district
- Kaserwand (1.690 m), Rosenheim district
- Brecherspitz (1.683 m), Miesbach district
- Hochsalwand (1.625 m), Rosenheim district
- Brünnstein (1.619 m), Rosenheim district
- Seebergkopf (1.538 m), Rosenheim district
- Großer Riesenkopf (1.337 m)
- Madron (942 m), Rosenheim district
- Petersberg (847 m), Rosenheim district

=== Lakes ===
Like the Alps as a whole, the Mangfall Mountains were heavily affected by the last ice age (Würm glaciation). For example, lakes like the Tegernsee, and the typical U-shaped valleys were formed by glaciers.

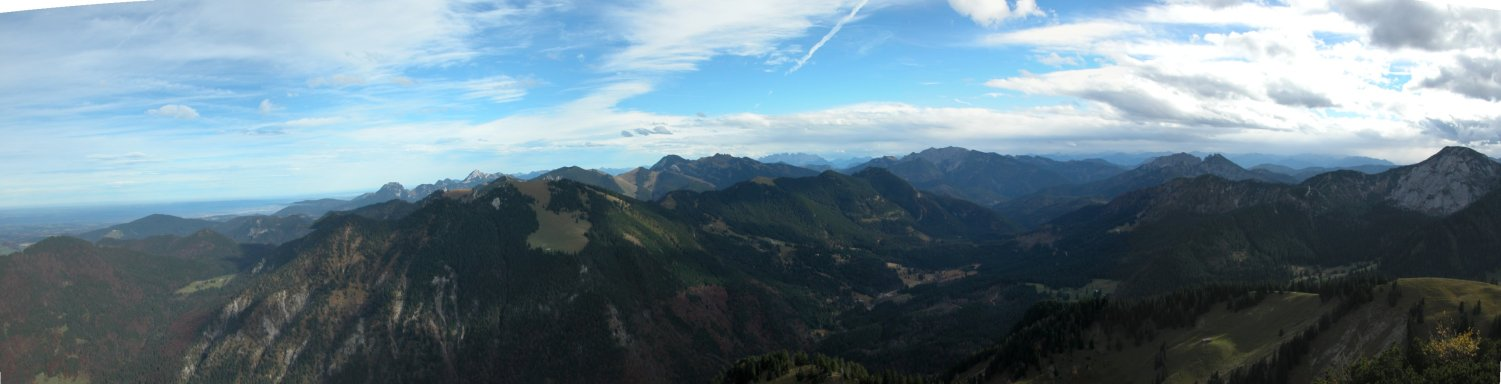
Mangfall Mountains - view from Wallberg looking east-northeast to southeast: Chiemsee (rear left), valley of the Weißen Valepp (centre), Schinder (right)
