= Rottach (Tegernsee) =

River in Bavaria, Germany

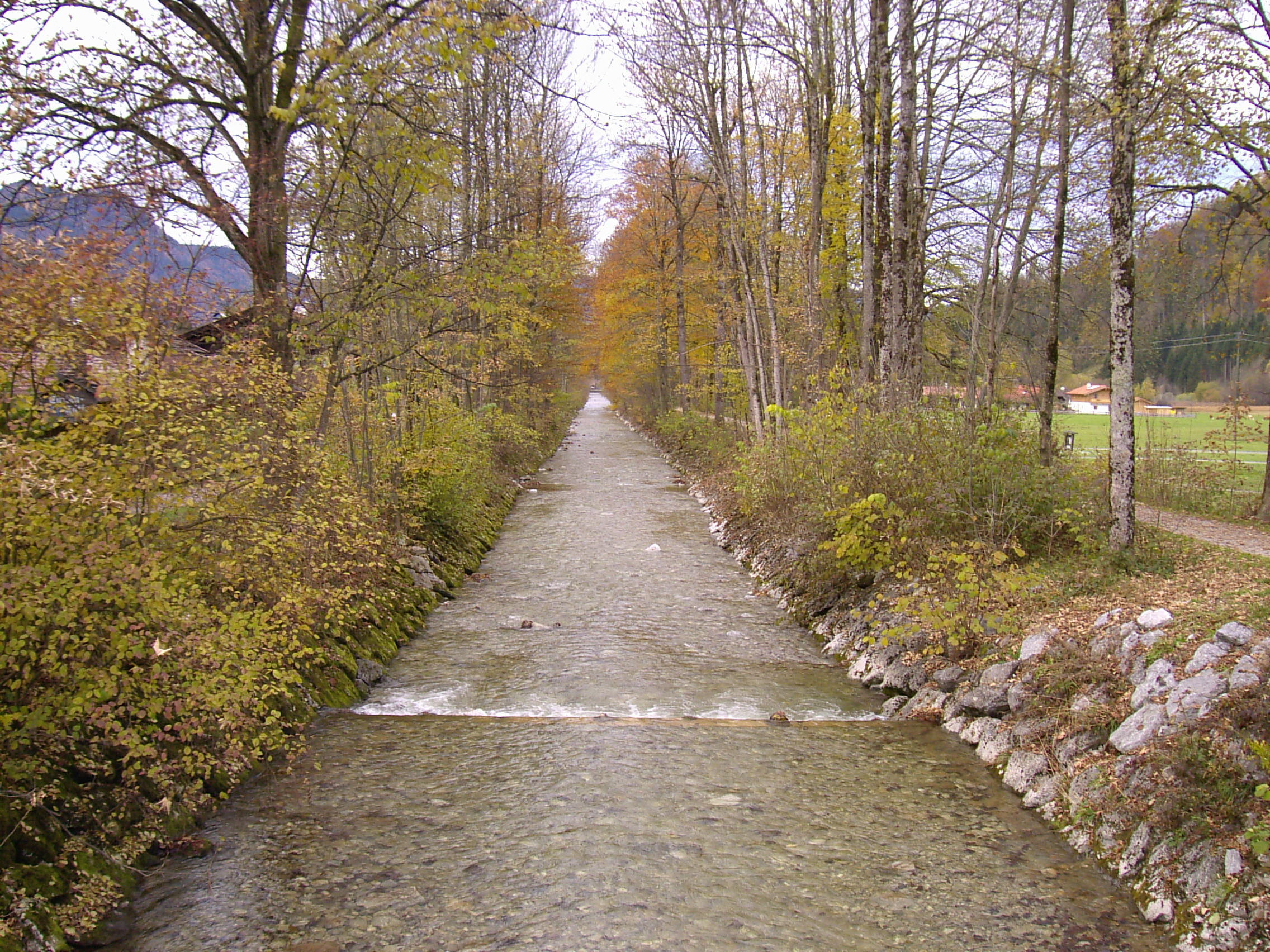

Location
- Country: Germany
- State: Bavaria

Physical characteristics
- Mouth
  - location: Tegernsee
  - coordinates: 47.6951°N 11.7699°E
- Length: 9.5 km (5.9 mi)

Basin features
- Progression: Mangfall→ Inn→ Danube→ Black Sea

Rottach is a river of Bavaria, Germany. It flows into the Tegernsee, which is drained by the Mangfall, in Rottach-Egern.

== See also ==
- List of rivers of Bavaria
