= Bear JJ1 =

Famous brown bear

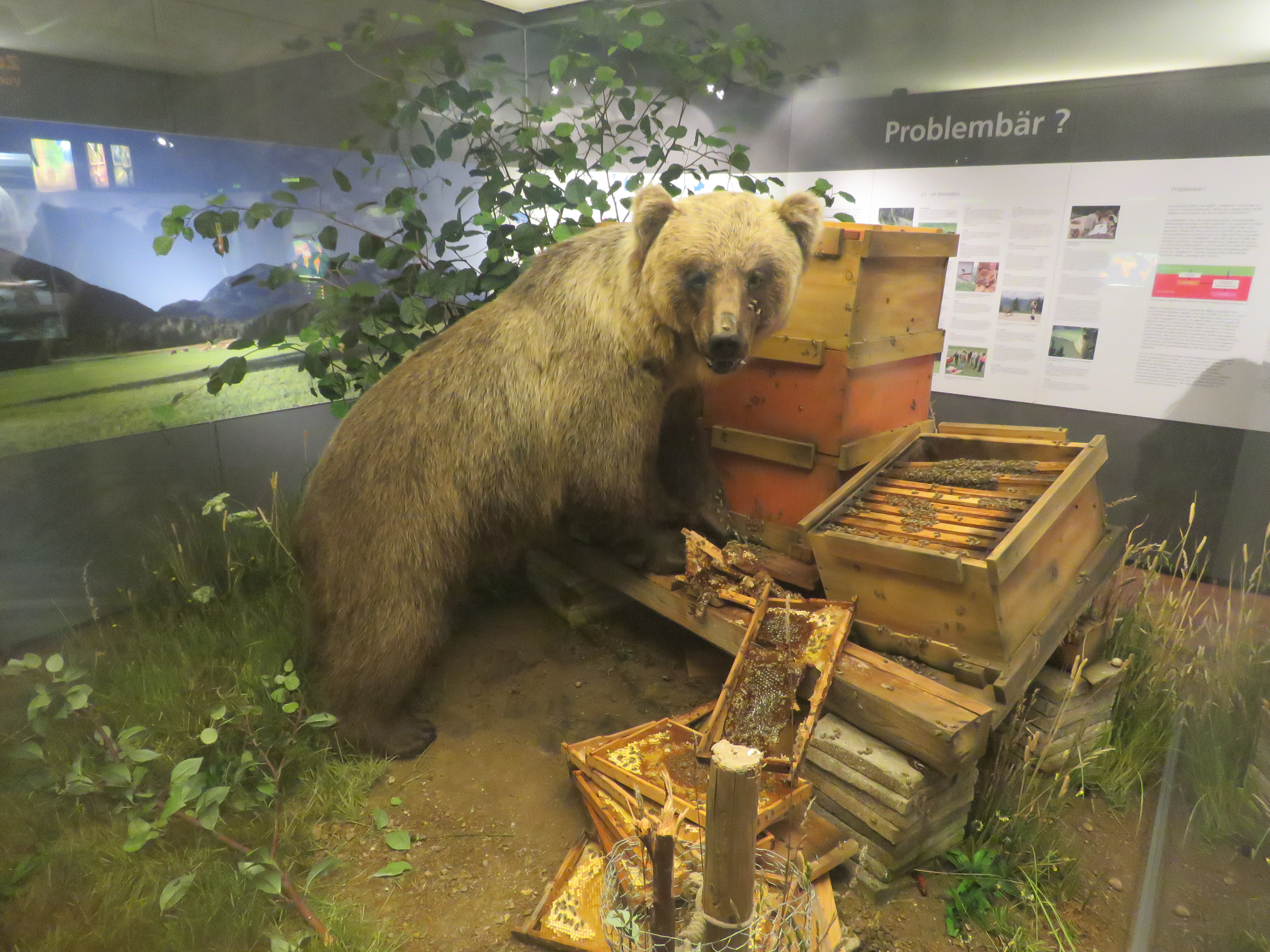
The stuffed body of JJ1 on display at the Museum of Man and Nature in Munich

Bear JJ1 (2004 – 26 June 2006) was a brown bear whose travels and exploits in Austria and Germany in the first half of 2006 drew international attention. JJ1, nicknamed Bruno by the German press, is believed to have been the first brown bear on German soil in 170 years.

== Origin ==
JJ1's route

JJ1 was originally part of an EU-funded €1 million conservation project in Italy, but had walked across to Austria and into Germany. A spokesman said that there had been "co-ordination" between Italy, Austria and Slovenia to ensure the bear's welfare but apparently Germany had not been informed. The Life Ursus reintroduction project of the Italian province of Trento had introduced 10 Slovenian bears in the region, monitoring them. JJ1 was the first son of Jurka and Joze (thus the name JJ1); his younger brother JJ3 also showed an aggressive character, wandered into Switzerland in 2008, and was killed there. Because of this second problem the mother Jurka was put in captivity in Italy, despite protests by environmentalists; park authorities maintained that 50% of the incidents involving bears had been caused by Jurka or her descendants.
In April 2023, his sister JJ4 killed 26-year-old jogger Andrea Papi in the Trentino province of northern Italy. In the summer of 2020, the bear had also attacked and injured a man and his son on Monte Peller and was originally ruled to be put down, but the ruling was later suspended.

== Overview ==
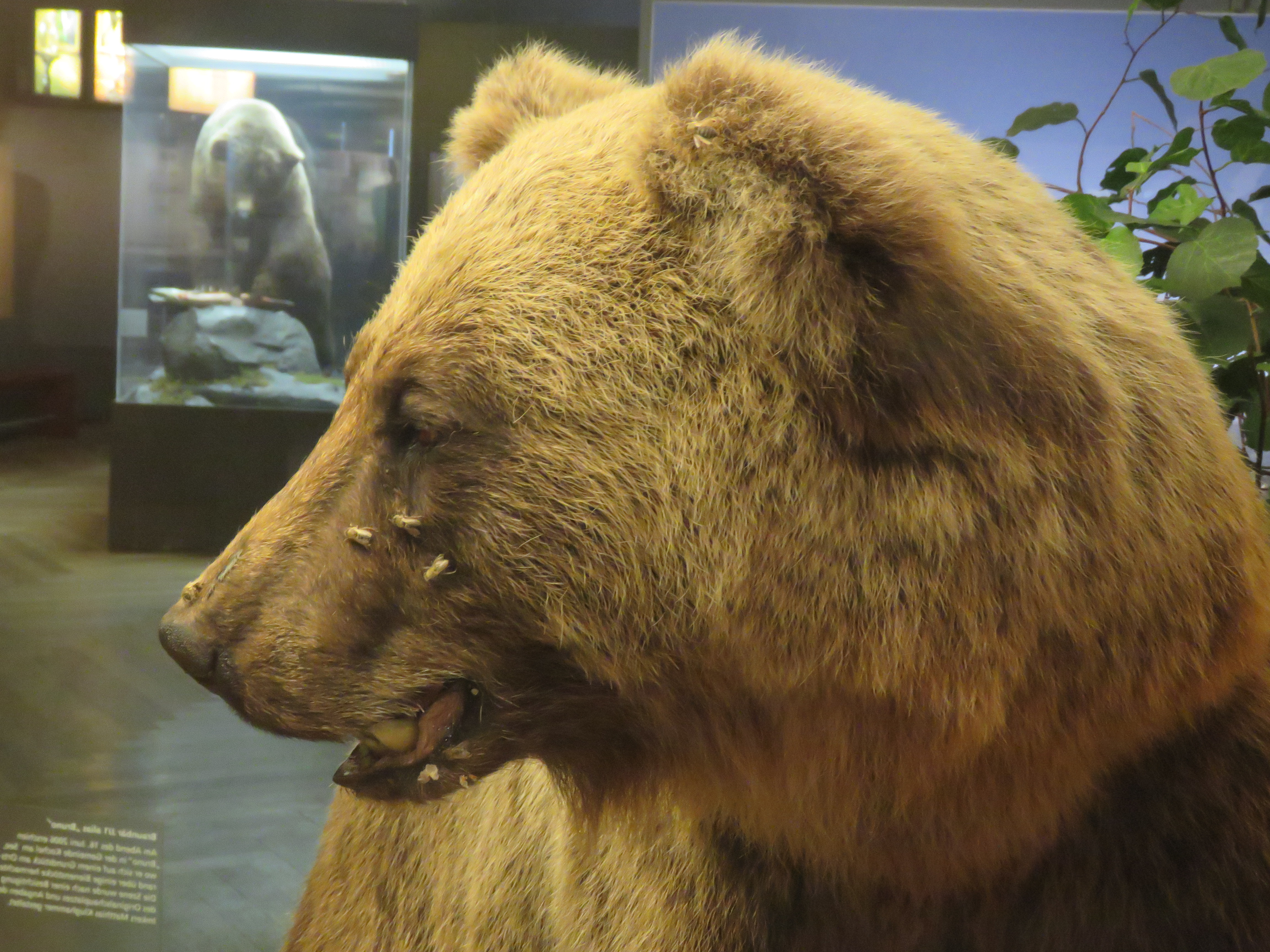
JJ1's head with taxidermied bees, referencing his penchant for rummaging through beehives

Previously, the last sighting of a bear in what is now Germany was recorded in 1838 when hunters shot a bear in Bavaria. Initially heralded as a welcome visitor and a symbol of the success of endangered species reintroduction programs, JJ1's dietary preferences for sheep, chickens, and beehives led government officials to believe that he could become a threat to humans, and they ordered that he be shot or captured. Public objection to the order resulted in its revision, and the German government tried to use non-lethal means to sedate and capture the bear instead.

JJ1 was described as bloodthirsty, clever, and fast. Bavarian minister-president Edmund Stoiber referred to him as a Problembär ("problem bear"). Farmers claimed the bear "enjoyed killing," because he typically killed sheep without eating them. This behavior, called surplus killing, common among predators, was construed as being caused by interaction with people. By 21 June 2006, he had killed at least 33 sheep, four domestic rabbits, one guinea pig, as well as some hens and goats. Further concern was expressed due to the proximity of the bear's preferred prey to humans.

It was reported that several attempts were made to catch JJ1 alive, assisted by a team of Finnish bear hunters using five Swedish and Norwegian elk hounds. The attempts failed, and JJ1 was shot at Rotwand mountain near Spitzingsee in southern Bavaria in the early morning of 26 June 2006.

JJ1 became a subject of diplomatic strife. The Italian government in Rome declared JJ1 to be state property of Italy, and demanded his return. The government of Bavaria, where JJ1 was shot dead, refused, claiming that a carcass on German land is theirs to keep. JJ1 has been stuffed, and is currently on display at the Museum of Man and Nature in Munich.

== See also ==
- List of individual bears

== See also ==
- Bear 71
- List of individual bears
