= Soinsee =

Lake in Miesbach, Bavaria, Germany

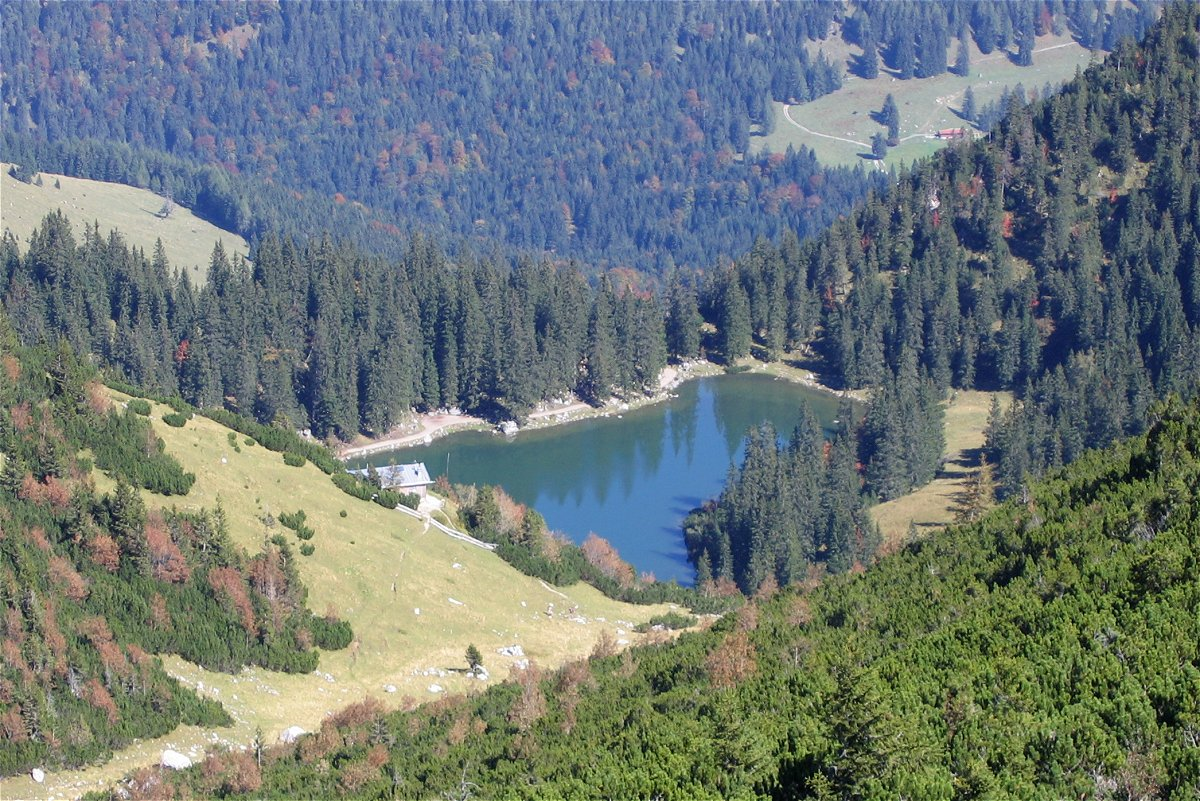

- Location within Bavaria
- Location: Mangfallgebirge, Bavaria
- Coordinates: 47°39′02″N 11°57′18″E
- Primary outflows: Soingraben
- Basin countries: Germany
- Max. length: 390 m (1,280 ft)
- Max. width: 170 m (560 ft)
- Surface area: 4.97 ha (12.3 acres)
- Average depth: 4.19 m (13.7 ft)
- Max. depth: 9.5 m (31 ft)
- Water volume: 208,000 m^{3} (7,300,000 cu ft)
- Shore length^{1}: 1 km (0.62 mi)
- Surface elevation: 1,458 m (4,783 ft)
- ^{1} Shore length is not a well-defined measure.

Soinsee is a lake in Mangfallgebirge, Bavaria, Germany. At an elevation of 1,458 m, its surface area is 4.97 ha.
