= Hochsalwand =

Coordinates: 47°43′04″N 12°02′08″E

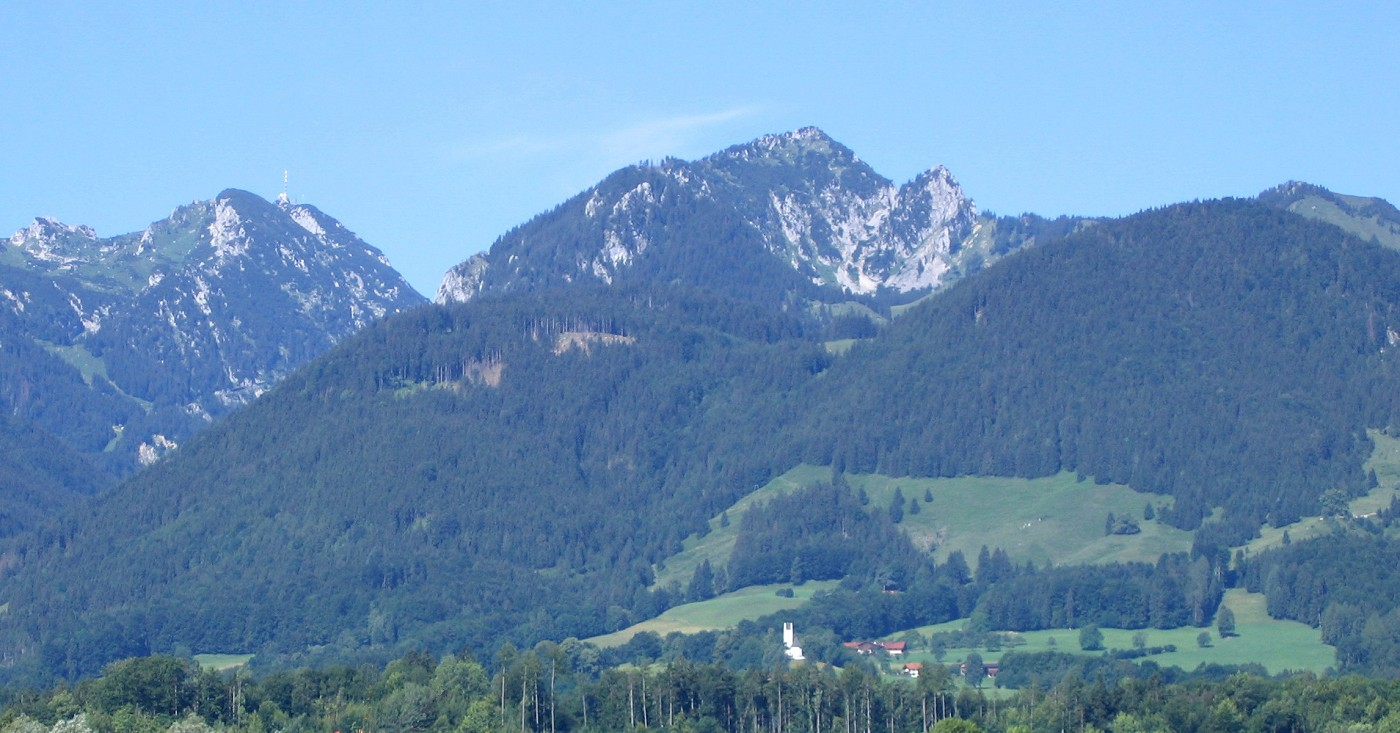
- Wendelstein (left), Hochsalwand (middle) with Lechnerkopf, as seen from Flintsbach

Highest point
- Elevation: 1,625 m (5,331 ft)

Geography
- Location: Bavaria, Germany

Hochsalwand is a mountain in Bavaria, Germany.
