= Museum of Man and Nature =

Natural history museum in Munich, Germany

Coordinates: 48.159°N 11.504°E

This about the German museum; for the Canadian one, see Manitoba Museum.

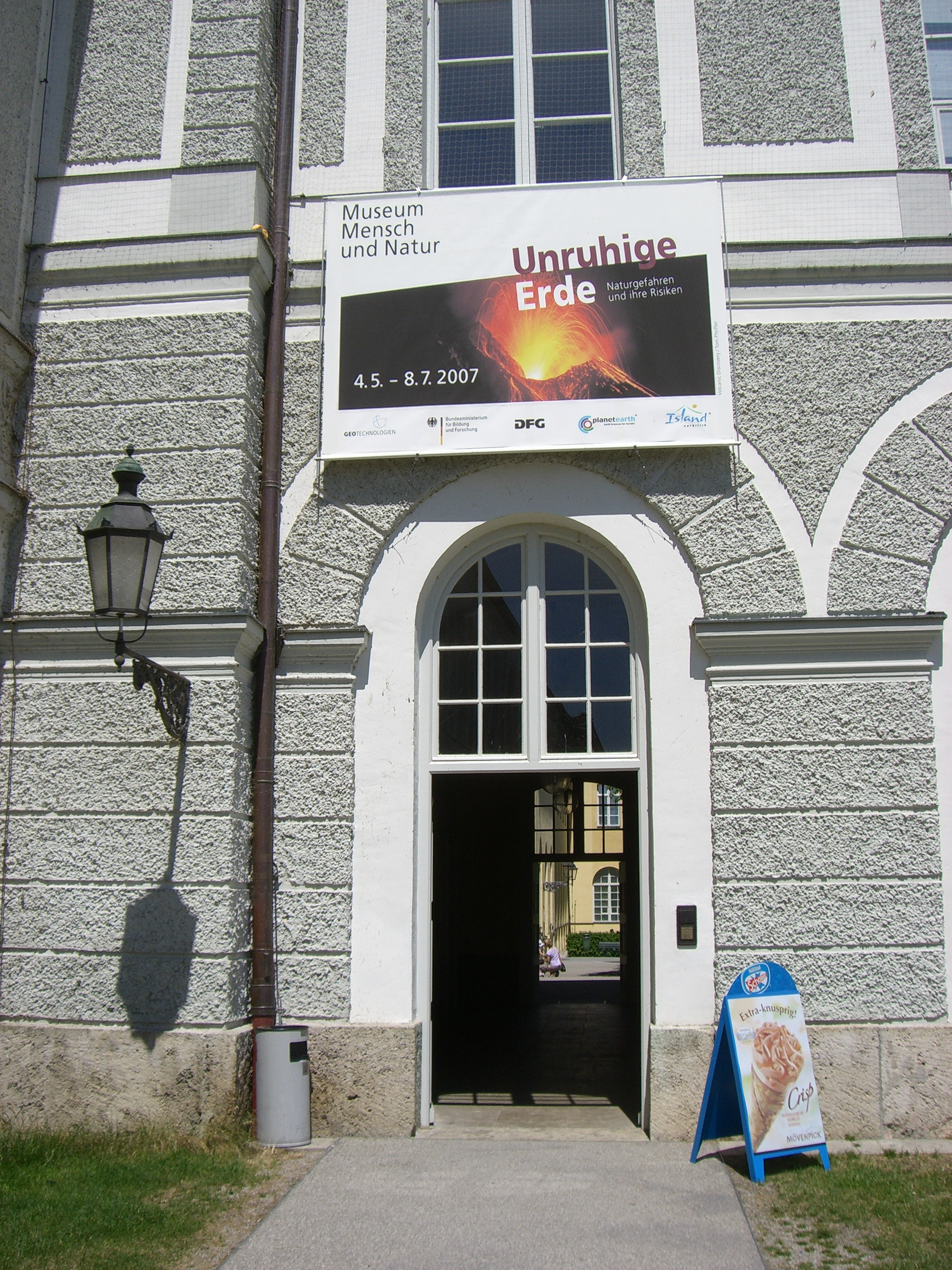

The Museum Mensch und Natur (English Museum of Man and Nature) is a natural history museum. It is a tenant of the Nymphenburg Palace in Munich, Germany.

== Bear exhibit ==
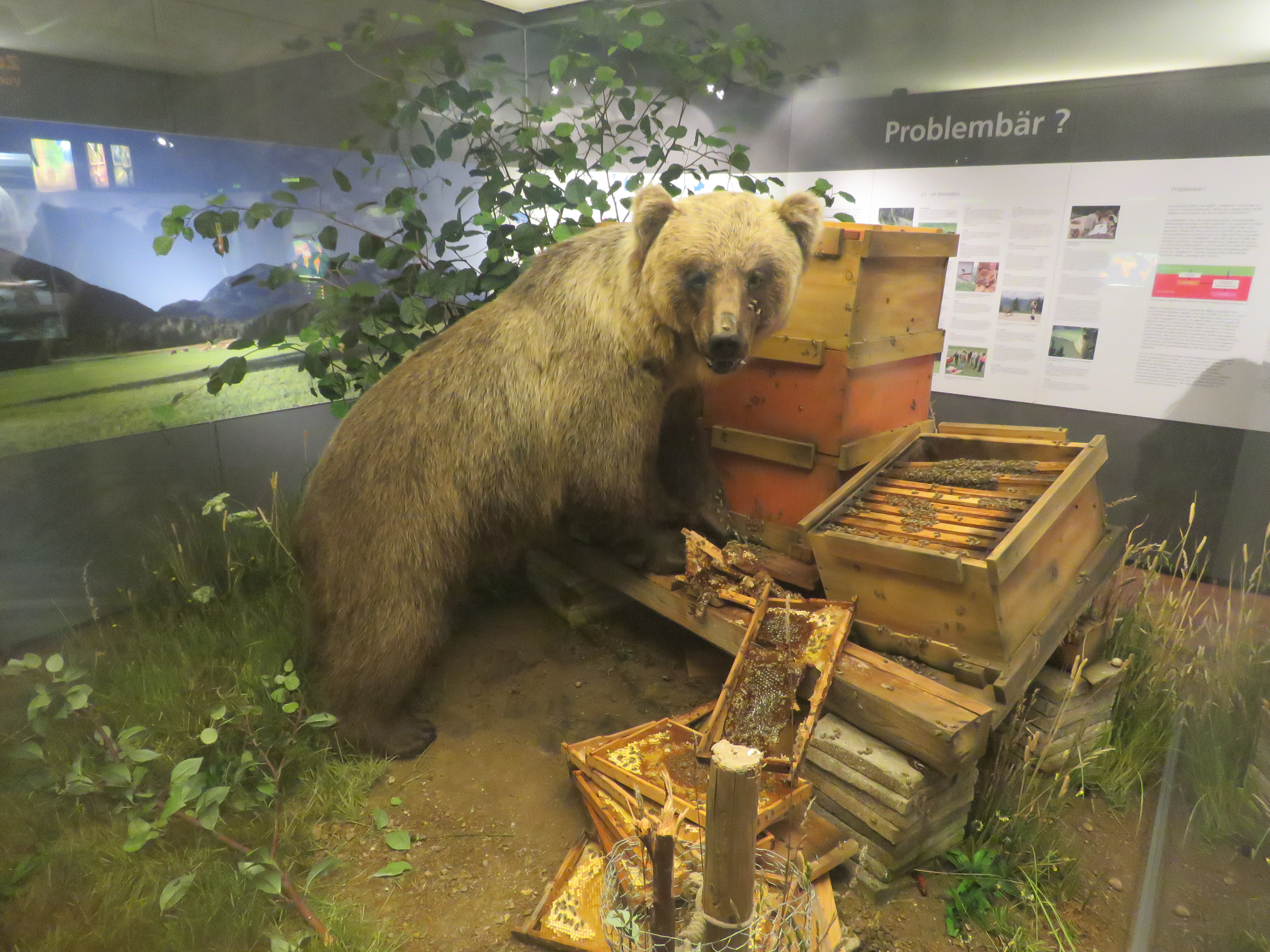
The stuffed body of JJ1 on display at the museum

In 2006, the museum received the stuffed and mounted body of "Bear JJ1", nicknamed "Bruno" in the German-language press, which was a brown bear that was shot dead by a hunter as a public safety measure after several unsuccessful efforts to capture him alive. JJ1 had been part of a wildlife restoration program in Italy but walked across Austria into Germany. The bear was put on display next to the last bear previously killed (in 1835) in Bavaria.

== See also ==
- List of museums in Germany
- List of natural history museums
