= Madron (Mangfall Mountains) =

Coordinates: 47°43′N 12°08′E

Madron (Mangfallgebirge)

Highest point
- Elevation: 942 m (3,091 ft)

Geography
- Location: Bavaria, Germany

Madron (Mangfallgebirge) is a mountain of Bavaria, Germany. Its highest top is at 942m and it can be reached with approximately 1.5 to 2 hours of hiking.
