= Seebergkopf =

Mountain in Bavaria, Germany

Coordinates: 47°39′51″N 11°59′52″E

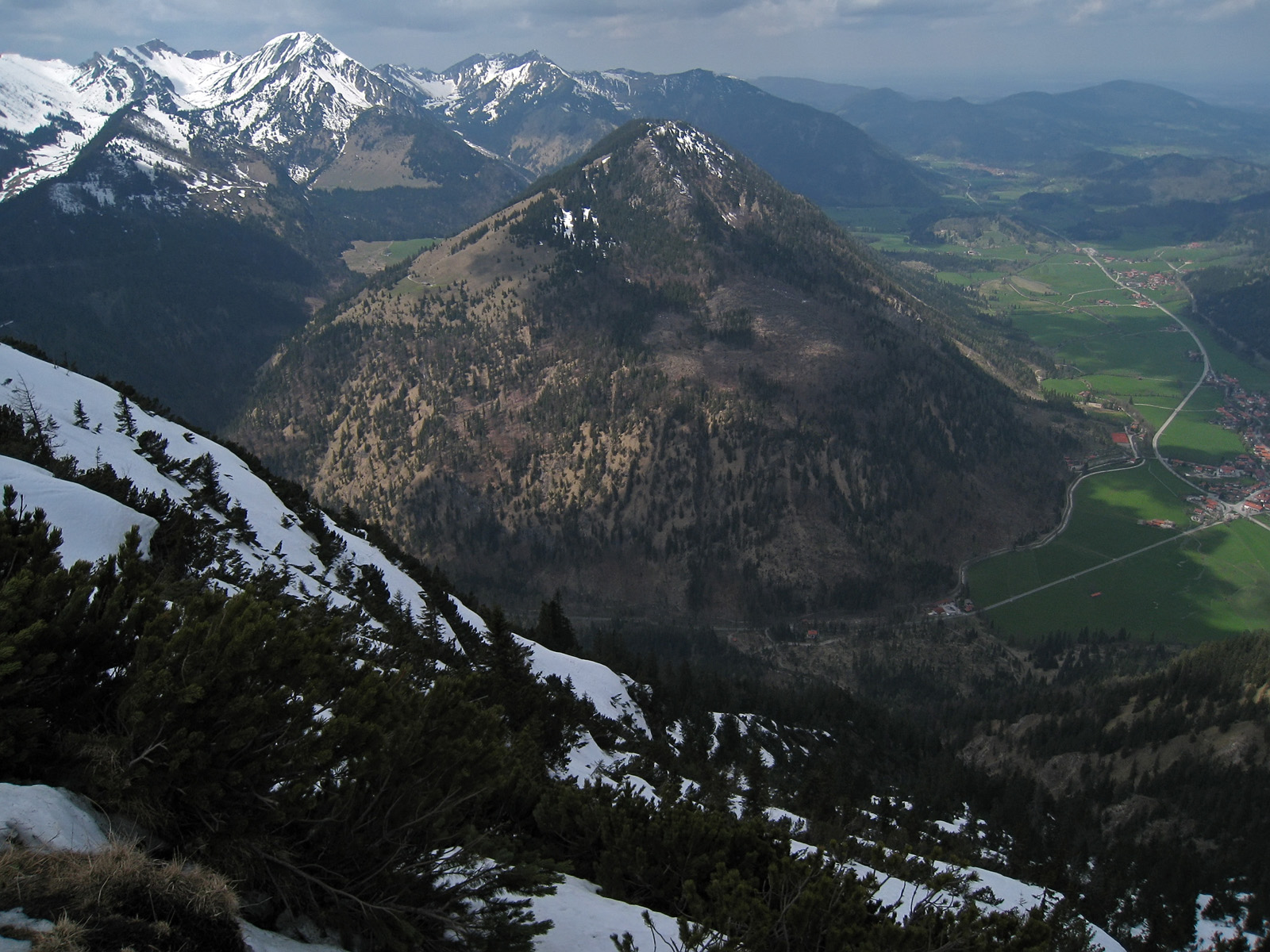

Highest point
- Elevation: 1,538 m (5,046 ft)

Geography
- Location: Bavaria, Germany

Seebergkopf is a mountain of Bavaria, Germany.
