= Kaserwand =

Mountain in Bavaria, Germany

Coordinates: 47°42′01″N 12°01′59″E

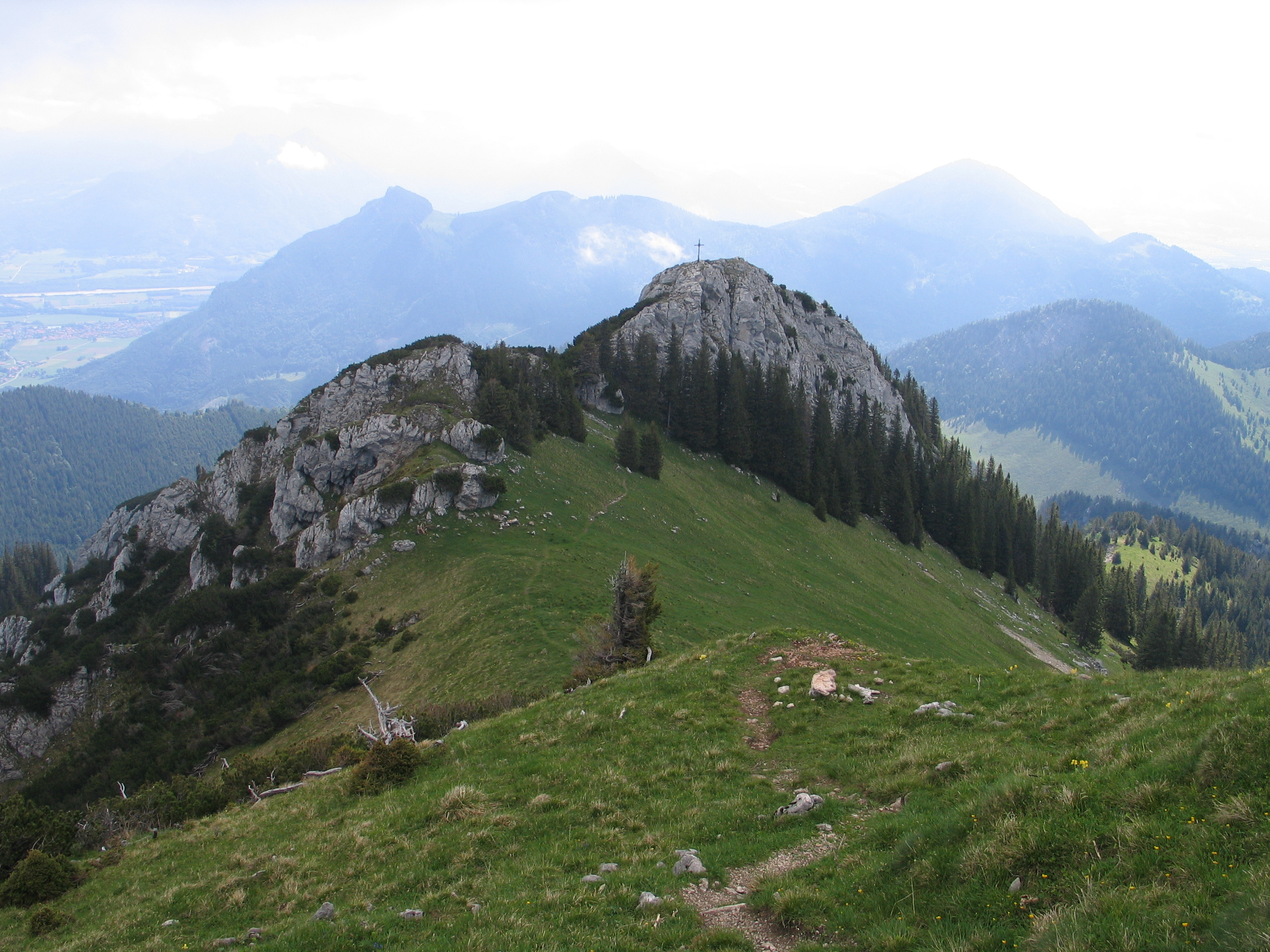

Highest point
- Elevation: 1,690 m (5,540 ft)

Geography
- Location: Bavaria, Germany

Kaserwand is a mountain of Bavaria, Germany.
