= Schinder (mountain) =

Coordinates: 47°36′04″N 11°51′40″E

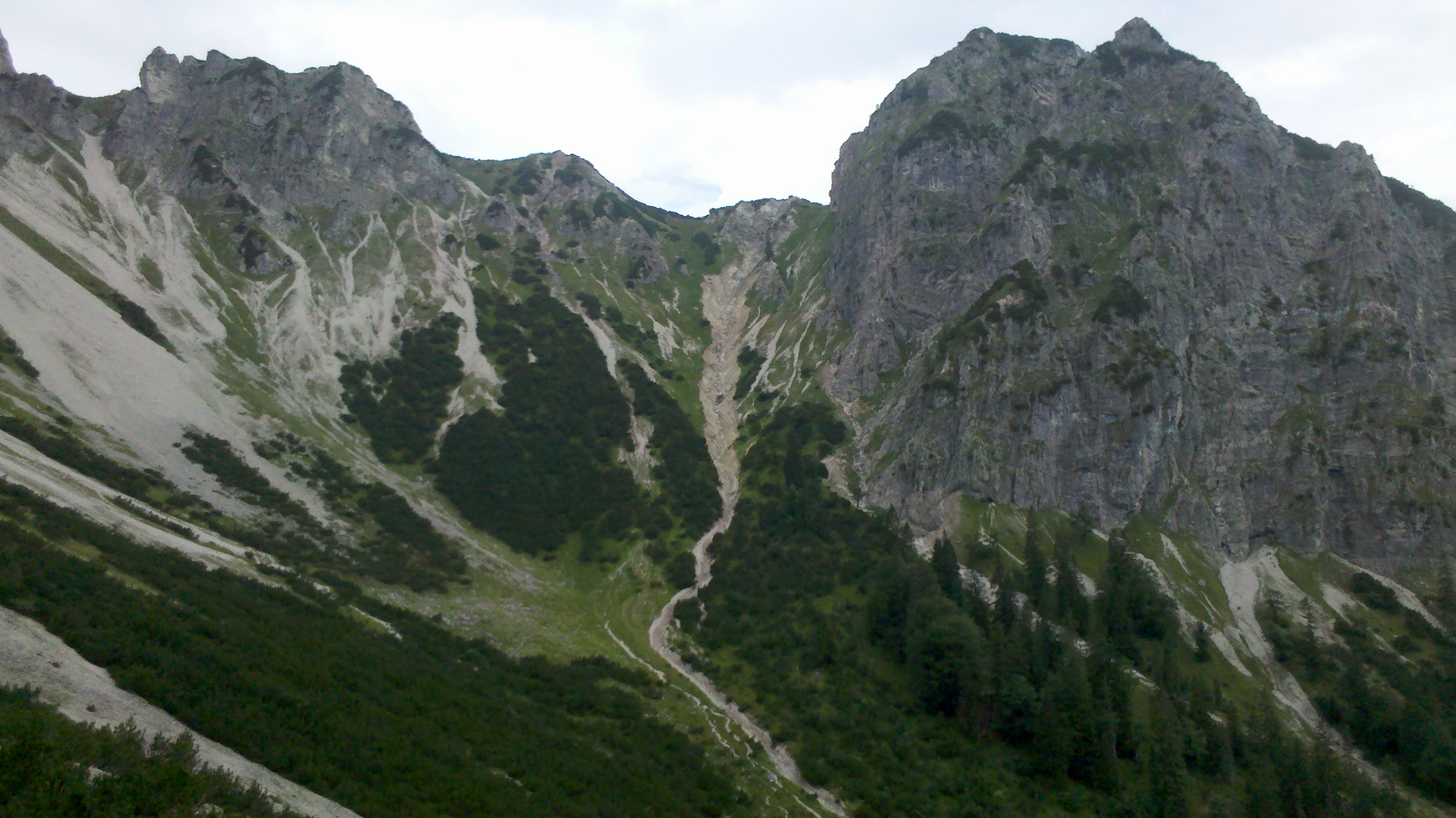
- Cirque of the Schinder with Rotkogel to the right

Highest point
- Elevation: 1,808 m (5,932 ft)

Geography
- Location: Bavaria, Germany and Tyrol, Austria

Geology
- Mountain type: Main dolomite

Climbing
- Easiest route: alpine hike

Schinder is a mountain on the border of Bavaria, Germany and Tyrol, Austria. There are two summits, one called Austrian Schinder or Trausnitzberg (1808 m), and the other slightly lower one called Bavarian Schinder (1796 m). The former sits right on the border of Bavaria and Tyrol, whereas the latter is situated wholly in Bavaria.

== Alpinism ==
The easiest summit access route lies on the south side and passes alp Trausnitzalm. The north face of the Schinder forms an impressive cirque for such a relatively low altitude mountain, with an ascent that leads through that cirque.
