= Tegernsee (lake) =

Lake in the Bavarian Alps, Germany

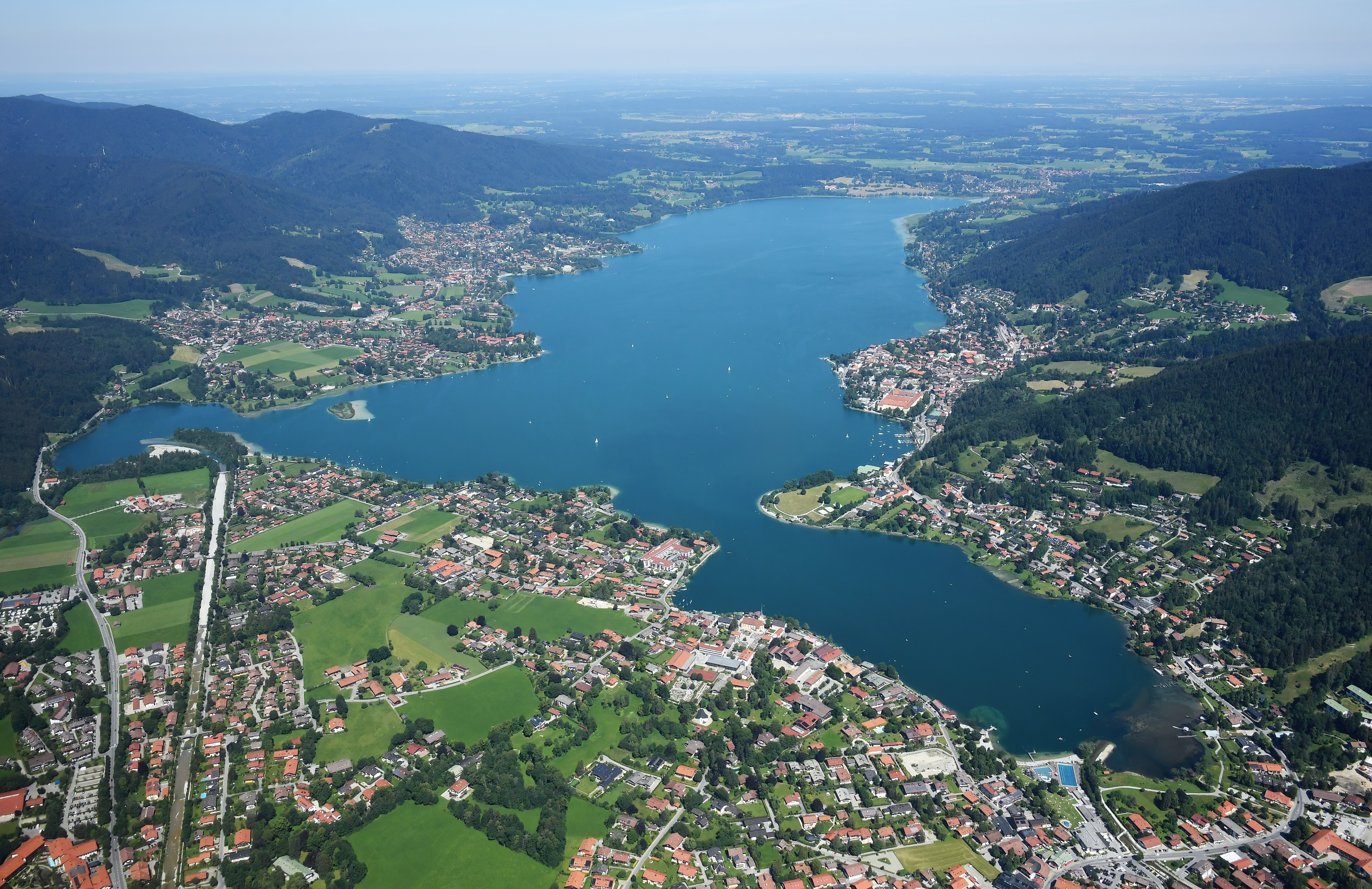
- Aerial photo of the lake

- Location within Bavaria
- Location: Bavaria
- Coordinates: 47°43′18″N 11°44′12″E
- Primary inflows: Weißach, Rottach, Alpbach, Söllbach, Breitenbach, Zeisselbach
- Primary outflows: Mangfall
- Catchment area: 212 km^{2} (82 sq mi)
- Basin countries: Germany
- Max. length: 6.5 km (4.0 mi)
- Max. width: 1.4 km (0.87 mi)
- Surface area: 8.934 km^{2} (3.449 sq mi)
- Average depth: 36.3 m (119 ft)
- Max. depth: 72.6 m (238 ft)
- Water volume: 324×10^{6} m^{3} (11.4×10^{9} cu ft)
- Residence time: 1.28 years
- Surface elevation: 725.50 m (2,380.2 ft)
- Islands: Ringsee-Insel (1,940 m²)
- Settlements: Tegernsee, Bad Wiessee

The Tegernsee (German pronunciation: [ˈteːɡɐnˌzeː]) is a Zungenbecken lake in the Bavarian Alps in southern Germany. The lake is the centre of a popular recreation area 50 kilometres (31 mi) south-east of Munich. Resorts on the lake include the eponymous Tegernsee, as well as Bad Wiessee, Kreuth, Gmund, and Rottach-Egern.

The lake is some 6.5 kilometres (4.0 mi) in length, 1.4 kilometres (0.87 mi) across at its widest, and spans an area of 8.934 square kilometres (3.449 sq mi). It reaches a maximum depth of 72.6 metres (238 ft), with an average depth of 36.3 metres (119 ft), and the normal water level is 725.5 metres (2,380 ft) above sea level. The lake's outflow is the River Mangfall, a tributary of the River Inn and thence the River Danube.

The buildings of the former Benedictine monastery of Tegernsee Abbey lie on the banks of the lake. Now in private hands, they are now known as Schloss Tegernsee.

The area around the lake is linked to Munich by rail through trains of the Bayerische Oberlandbahn, which, in the final part of their journey, travel over the tracks of the privately owned Tegernsee-Bahn. Pleasure boat services serve several points on the lake, and are operated by boats of the Bayerische Seenschifffahrt company.

Adolf Hitler owned a house on the shores of Tegernsee and reclused here following the suicide of his niece and girlfriend, Geli Raubal, in 1931.
