= Spitzingsee =

Lake in Schliersee, Bavaria, Germany

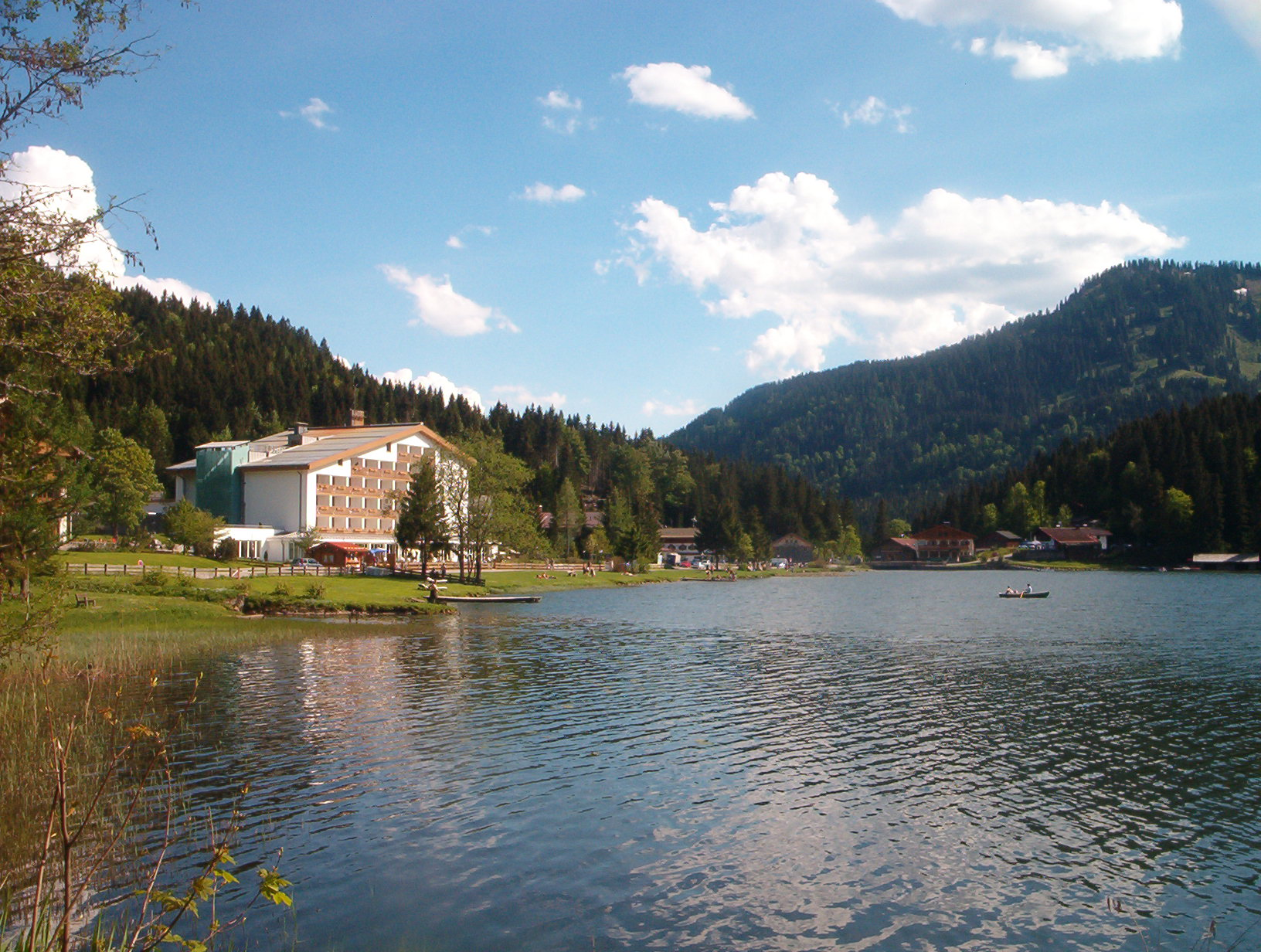

- Location within Bavaria
- Location: Schliersee Mountains, Bavaria
- Coordinates: 47°39′58″N 11°53′12″E
- Primary inflows: Lochgraben, Firstgraben
- Primary outflows: Rote Valepp
- Basin countries: Germany
- Max. length: 950 m (3,120 ft)
- Max. width: 300 m (980 ft)
- Surface area: 28.3 ha (70 acres)
- Average depth: 7.24 m (23.8 ft)
- Max. depth: 16.30 m (53.5 ft)
- Water volume: 2,049,000 m^{3} (72,400,000 cu ft)
- Shore length^{1}: 2.9 km (1.8 mi)
- Surface elevation: 1,084 m (3,556 ft)
- ^{1} Shore length is not a well-defined measure.

Spitzingsee is a lake in Bavaria, Germany. At an elevation of 1084 m, its surface area is 28.3 hectares (70 acres).

== Geography ==
The Spitzingsee is located about five kilometers south of the Schliersee and a few hundred meters south of the Spitzingsattels at an altitude of 1084 m in the Schliersee Mountains in the Bavarian Alps. With a surface area of 28.3 ha (0.283 km^{2}), it is one of the largest mountain lakes in Bavaria. The lake's maximum depth is 16.3 m (53 ft) in the south basin, while the north basin's depth is up to 10.4 m (34 ft). The Spitzingsee has a comparatively large water catchment area of 7.51 km^{2} (2.90 sq mi).

The lake is owned by the Free State of Bavaria; the Bavarian Administration of State-Owned Palaces, Gardens and Lakes is responsible for its administration. .

== See also ==
- List of lakes in Bavaria
