= Hirschberg (Ohlstadt) =

Coordinates: 47°36′07″N 11°14′29″E

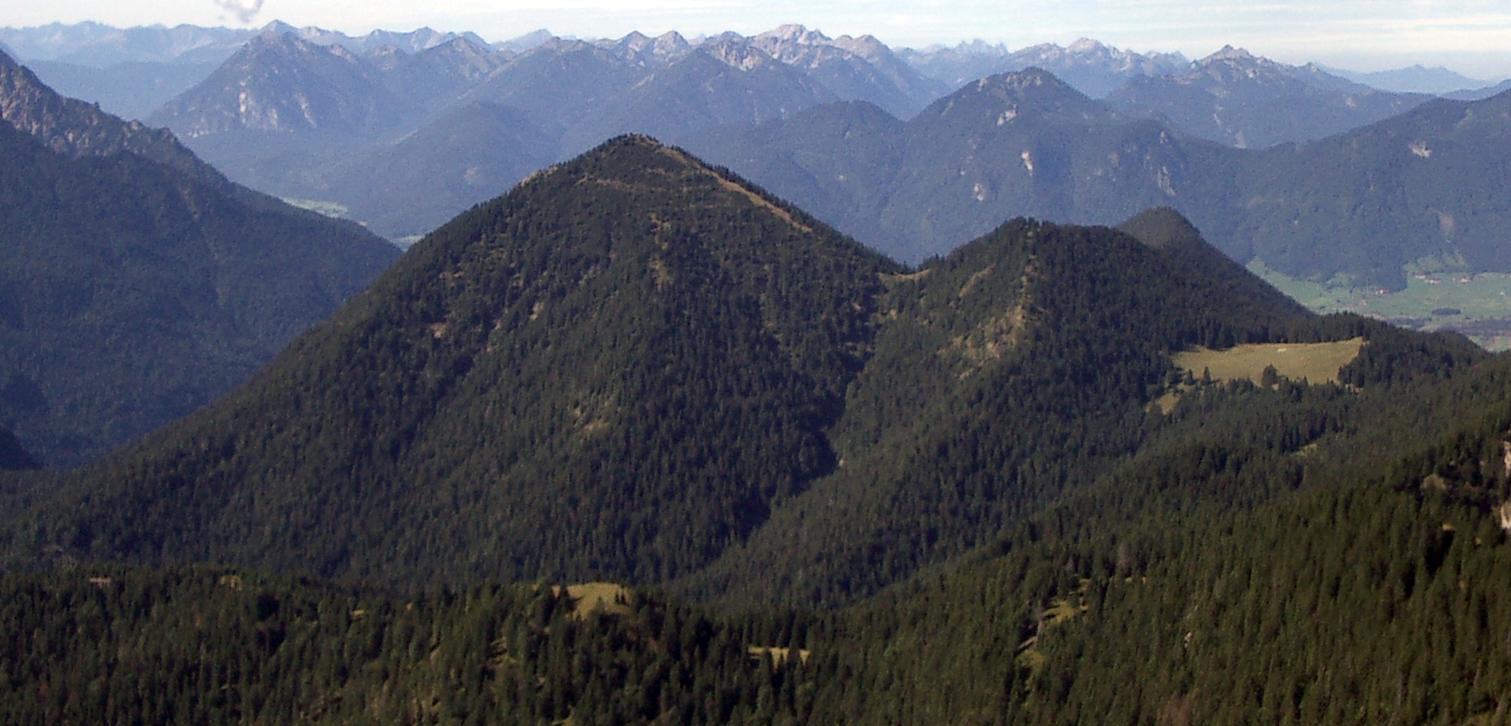
- Hirschberg and Ölrain from the Heimgarten

Highest point
- Elevation: 1,659 m (5,443 ft)

Geography
- Location: Bavaria, Germany

The Hirschberg is a 1,660 m above sea level (NHN) meter high mountain in the Walchensee Mountains in the Bavarian Prealps. It lies on the border between the municipalities and cadastral of Ohlstadt in the north and Eschenlohe in the south.

== Location and Surroundings ==
The Hirschberg is located about four kilometers east of Eschenlohe and five kilometers west of Walchensee. The center of the municipality of Ohlstadt is three kilometers to the north. South of the mountain runs the valley of the Eschenlaine, behind which the Ester Mountains with Simetsberg and Hohe Kisten are connected.

About 500 meters north of the summit, the 1,542 m meter high Ölrain is located, from which a distinctive mountain ridge extends westward to the 1,368 m meter high Osterfeuerspitze.

The Hirschberg is forested up to the summit area. On the somewhat steeper southern side, the forest is partly interspersed with scree.

== Trails ==
A forest road leads from Eschenlohe up the southern and eastern sides of the mountain to the Wankhütte (1,364 m) located north of the Ölrain. This route can also be covered by mountain bike. From the north, from Ohlstadt, the Wankhütte can be reached via a hiking trail. From the Wankhütte, the ascent leads partly off-trail, partly on a narrow path east past the Ölrain and then further up to the Hirschberg.
