= Wallberg =

Mountain

Coordinates: 47°39′59″N 11°47′45″E

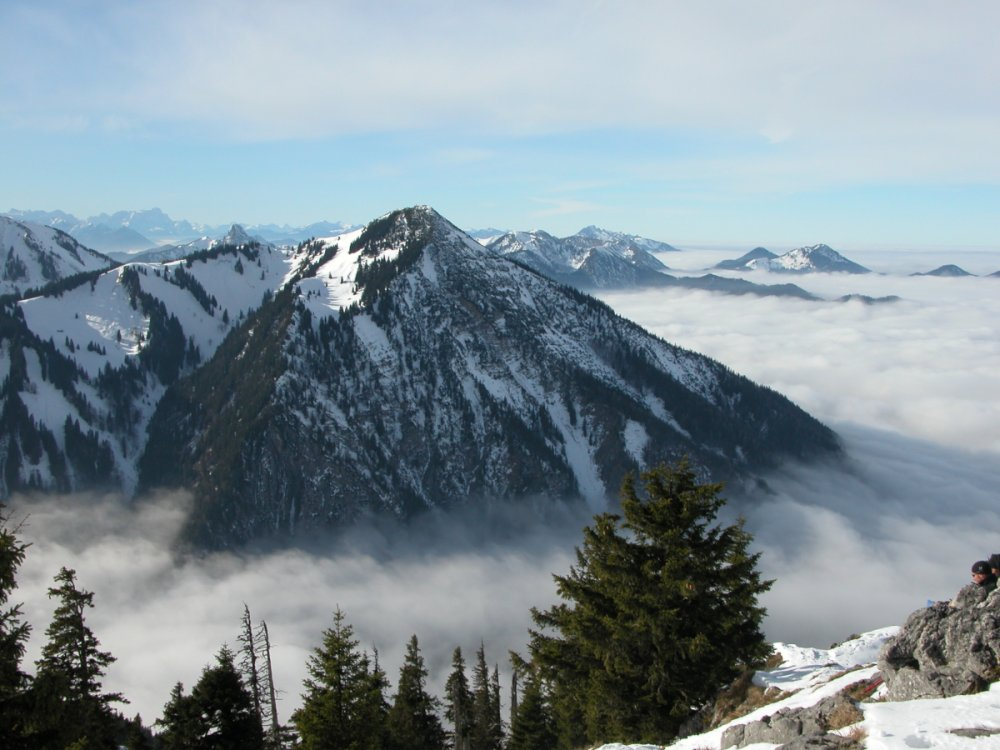
- Wallberg, seen from the east

Highest point
- Elevation: 1,722 m (5,650 ft)
- Prominence: 233 m (764 ft) ↓ Wallberghaus → Risserkogel
- Isolation: 3.07 km to Risserkogel

Geography
- Location: Bavaria, Germany

Wallberg (1.722 asl) is a mountain in the Mangfallgebirge, part of the Bavarian Alps in the south of Bavaria, Germany.

== General Information ==
The Wallberg has made history as the starting point for large distance flights of paragliders and hang-gliders. The Wallberg toboggan run is Germany's longest winter toboggan run. The Wallberg race on the Wallbergstraße, one of the best-known automobile mountain races in the 1960s, has not been held for some time for ecological reasons.

The ascent from the Wallbergbahn valley station near Rottach-Egern leads over a saddle to the left past the Setzberg (1,706 m) to the mountain station of the Wallbergbahn. The Wallberg panorama restaurant is located 1,623 m above sea level, 30 minutes walking below the summit.

The transmitter Wallberg is on the mountain.

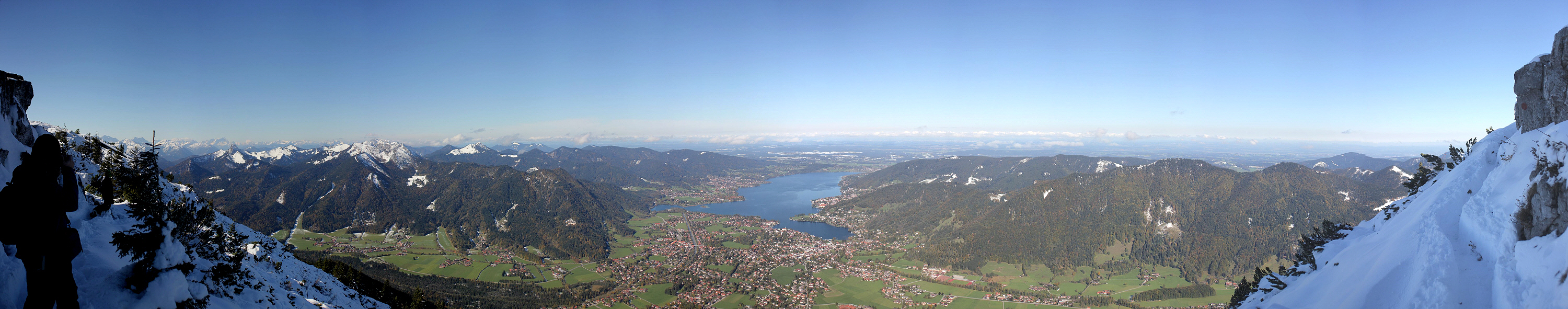
Shortly below the Wallberg, Tegernsee and its local mountains

== Literature (in German) ==
- "Die Wallbergstraße mit dem Schweiß der Legionäre gepflastert". Tegernseer Tal-Heft Nr. 94, S. 34 ff, Tegernseer Tal Verlag (Archivregister des Tegernseer Tal Verlags)
- Schroeder, Peter: Wallberg-Rennen. 1959–1988. Miesbach: Maurus, 2012. ISBN 978-3-940324-06-1
