= Bavarian Alps =

Series of mountain ranges in the German state of Bavaria

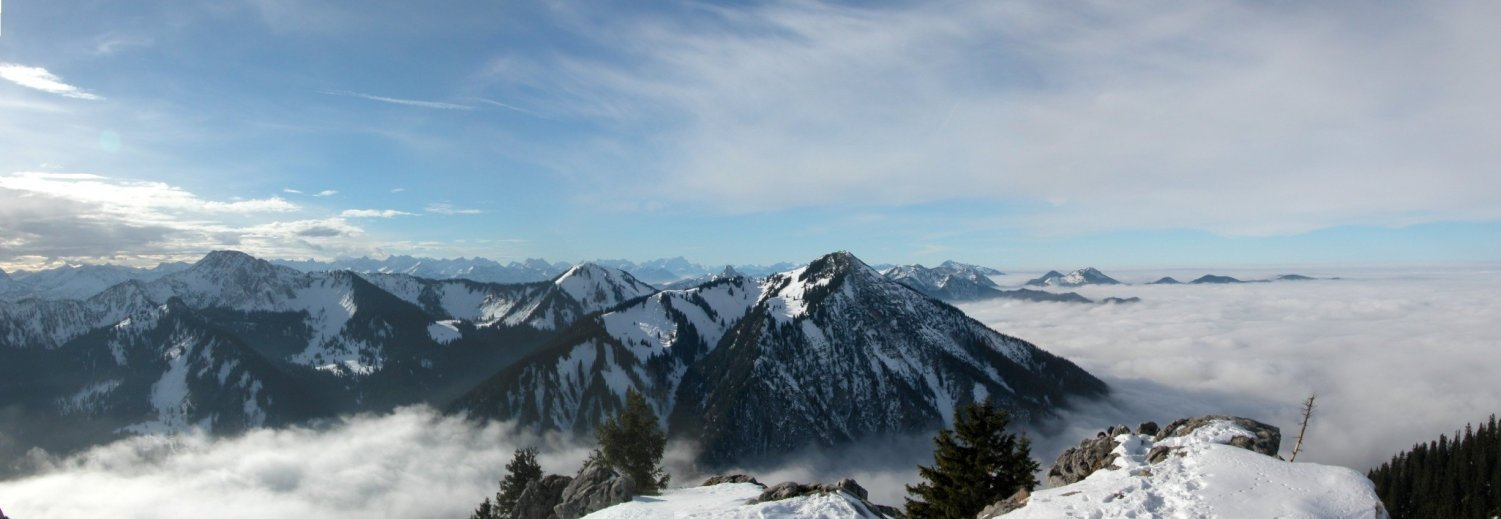
- View of the Mangfall Mountains from Bodenschneid looking west to the Wallberg

Highest point
- Peak: Zugspitze
- Elevation: 2,962 m (9,718 ft)
- Coordinates: 47°18′43″N 10°21′22″E

Naming
- Native name: Bayerische Alpen (German)

Geography
- Countries: Germany; Austria
- States: Bavaria; Tyrol/Vorarlberg
- Range coordinates: 47°38′N 11°46′E
- Parent range: Northern Limestone Alps
- Borders on: Western Rhaetian Alps; North Tyrol Limestone Alps; Northern Salzburg Alps

Geology
- Orogeny: Alpine orogeny

The Bavarian Alps (German: Bayerische Alpen, pronounced [ˈbaɪ(ə)ʁɪʃə ˈʔalpn̩]) is a collective name for several mountain ranges of the Northern Limestone Alps within the German state of Bavaria.

== Geography ==
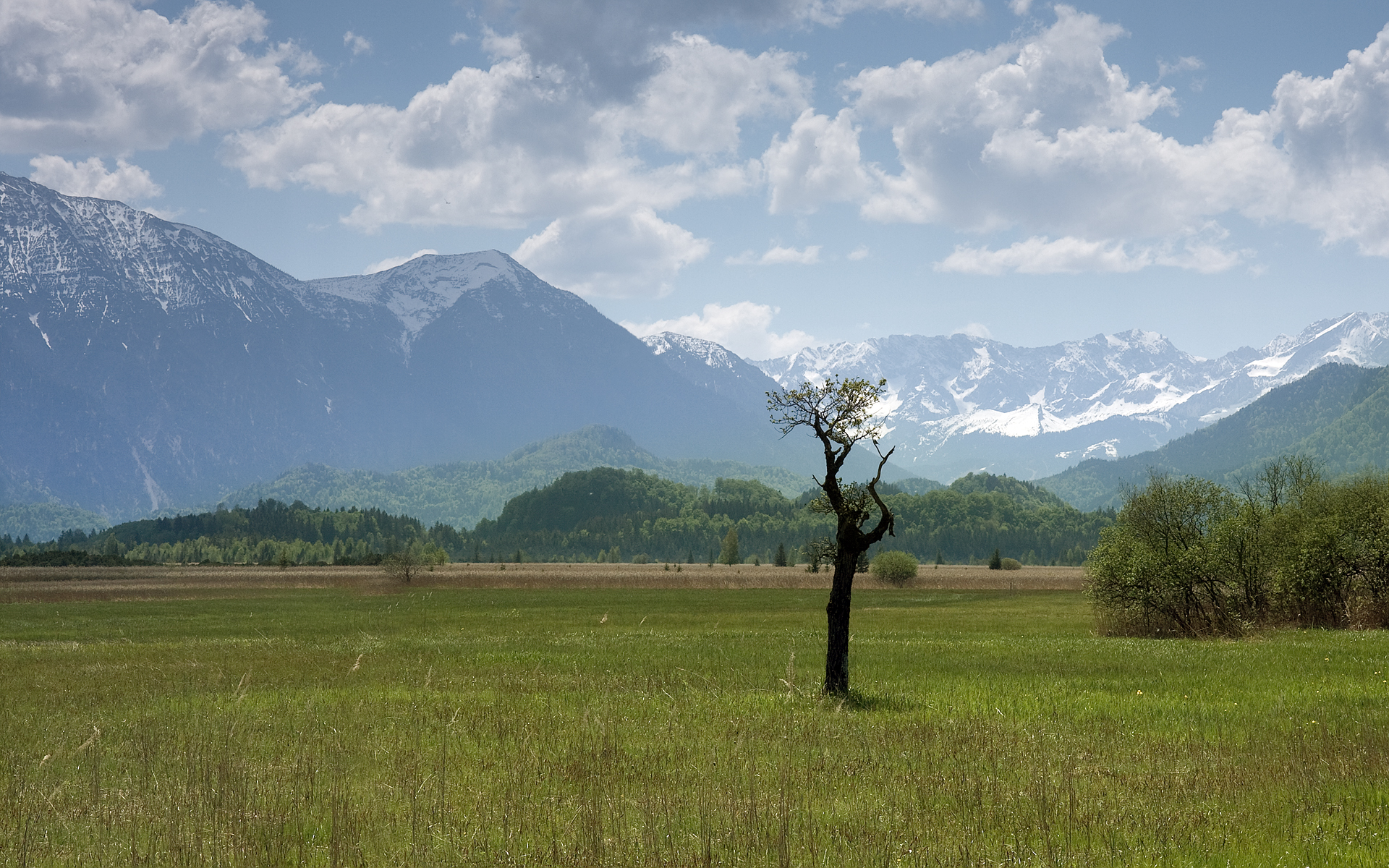
Bavarian Alps, view from Murnau

The term in its wider sense refers to that part of the Eastern Alps that lies on Bavarian state territory. However, it is traditionally understood that the Bavarian Alps are only those ranges between the rivers Lech and Saalach (Altbayern). In this narrower sense, the Allgäu Alps in Swabia, which have only been part of Bavaria in more recent times, and the Berchtesgaden Alps in the east are not considered part of the Bavarian Alps.

The term is frequently used, but does not correspond to the common classification of the Eastern Alps (AVE) developed by the German, Austrian and South Tyrol Alpine Clubs. It should not be confused with the term Bavarian Prealps either. The latter only covers the Bavarian section of the Prealps between the River Loisach in the west and the River Inn in the east.

According to the Italian Partizione Delle Alpi classification, the Bavarian Alps (Alpi Bavaresi) comprise the Allgäu and Lechtal Alps as well as the adjacent Achen Lake mountains.

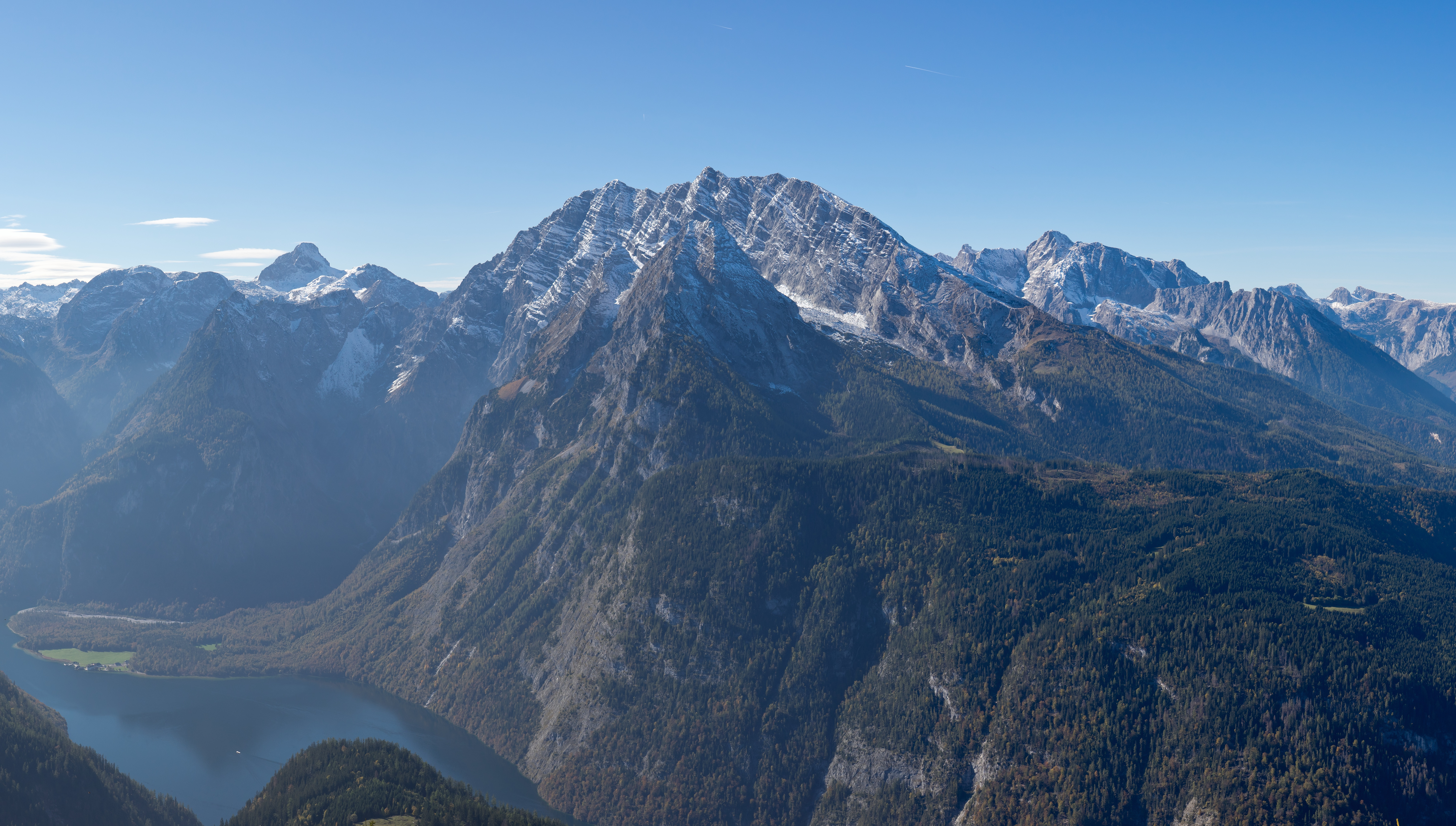
View from the Jenner over the Königssee to Watzmann massif

== Early human settlement ==
A rising number of mega charcoal pieces dated to the Bronze Age suggests increased slash and burn activities, possibly linked to the creation of open space for pasturing. These results provide evidence of human interaction with the mountain environment, beginning in the Neolithic Age and clear evidence of mountain pasture use beginning during the Iron Age at 750 BC. Based on palynology and pedoanthracology it is, however, difficult to clearly differentiate between pasturing, hunting, and other human interactions with the environment.

== Notable summits ==
The Bavarian Alps in their broader sense include the following parts of the mountain ranges listed − in this tabular overview sorted according to AVE roughly from west to east and with maximum heights above sea level (NN). The highest peaks and elevations shown relate to that part of the mountain group that lies in Bavaria, and not to the overall group. For example, the highest mountain of the Allgäu Alps, the 2,657 m above sea level (AA) high Großer Krottenkopf, lies in Tyrol and is not shown in the table.

The highest peak in the Bavarian Alps and in Germany as a whole is the Zugspitze. It lies in the western part of the Wetterstein range and has a high Alpine character with its height of 2,962 m above NN as well as its two small glaciers.

By clicking on the word "List" in the various rows of the Lists column, a list other mountains in the particular range may be viewed (noting that some of them will be outside Bavaria or the Bavarian Alps). The table may be sorted by clicking on the sort symbols in the column headers.

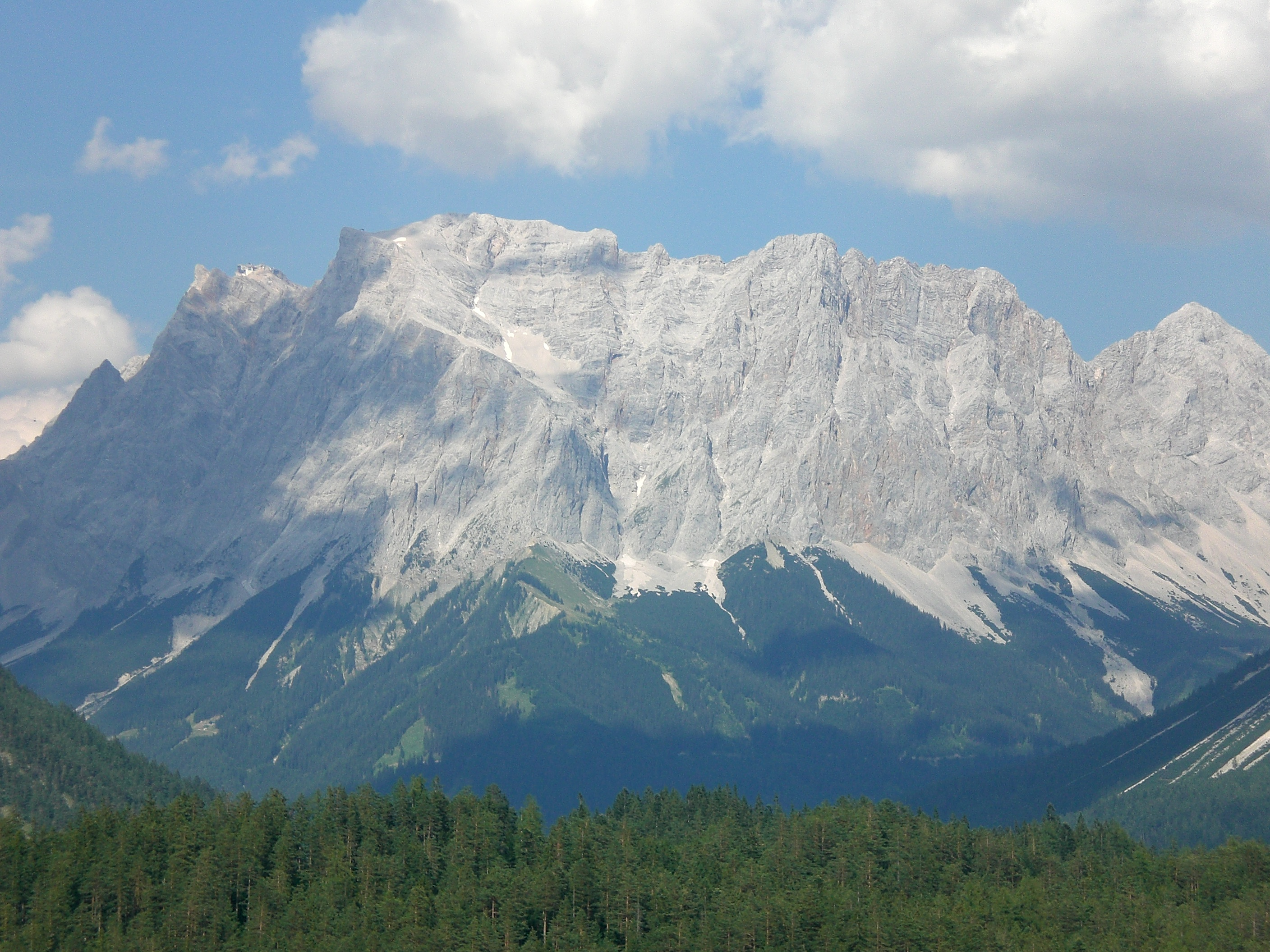
Zugspitze Massif with the Zugspitze peak (left), the highest mountain in Germany (seen from the Fern Pass in Austria, looking northeast)

| Range | Lists | Proportion in the Bavarian Alps | Highest peak on Bavarian state territory | Height |
|---|---|---|---|---|
| Allgäu Alps | List | Part | Hochfrottspitze | 2,649 m (8,691 ft) |
| Ammergau Alps | List | Most | Kreuzspitze | 2,185 m (7,169 ft) |
| Wetterstein | List | Part | Zugspitze | 2,962 m (9,718 ft) |
| Bavarian Prealps | List | Part | Krottenkopf | 2,086 m (6,844 ft) |
| Karwendel | List | Part | Östliche Karwendelspitze | 2,538 m (8,327 ft) |
| Chiemgau Alps | List | Most | Sonntagshorn | 1,961 m (6,434 ft) |
| Berchtesgaden Alps | List | Part | Watzmann | 2,713 m (8,901 ft) |

== Landscape ==
Like the Alps as a whole, the Bavarian Alps as part of the Northern Limestone Alps were heavily influenced by the last ice age. Cirques, lakes and typical U-shaped valleys were formed by the glaciers. Depositions by ice age rivers and glaciers left behind a gently rolling landscape in the Alpine Foreland with lakes and bogs.

== Animal life ==
Due to hunting and environmental shifts, many animals are just now being reintroduced into the habitat they once roamed. The continent's giant cat, the lynx, is one of those returnees. The lynx disappeared from the Bavarian Alps in the 19th century due to human persecution, along with predatory demands. A release project by Czech colleagues in the 1980s allowed for the lynx to have a second wind in the area, with the growth of the lynx population in the region. The gray wolf is the second giant predator and native to the Bavarian Forest. Like the lynx, the wolf was presumed extinct in the region, but due to conservation efforts and restraint on hunting in the area, they, too, are making a comeback.

Mammals such as wildcats, otters, or beavers inhabit the national park too. The region's most well-known bird is the capercaillie. The stocks of the capercaillie, which is quite rare in Germany, also decreased and nearly vanished in the Bavarian Forest during the 20th century. Although the bird was close to extinction, path regulations and sanctuaries helped to further their population growth.

The persecution of native animals in the region has been a long-time concern and issue along the Bavarian Alps. Thanks to recent strides in conservation, many of these animals are being reintroduced into this habitat through park services such as the National Forest in Bavaria.

== Sources ==
- DAV. Alpenvereins-Jahrbuch, "Berg '84": Die Einteilung der Ostalpen
- Bogner Franz X. (2011). Die deutschen Alpen aus der Luft. Rosenheimer Verlag, ISBN 978-3475540752.
