= Bavarian Prealps =

Mountain range in the Northern Limestone Alps, Austria-Germany

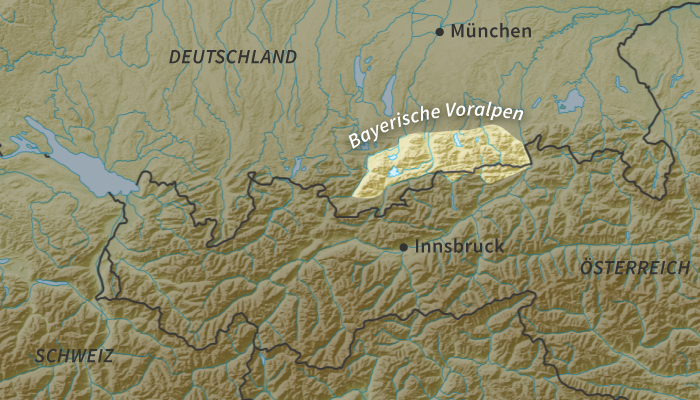
- The Bavarian Prealps within the Eastern Alps

Highest point
- Peak: Krottenkopf
- Elevation: 2,086 m (6,844 ft)

Dimensions
- Length: 70 km (43 mi)

Geography
- Countries: Germany and Austria
- States: Bavaria and Tyrol
- Range coordinates: 47°39′N 11°39′E
- Parent range: Northern Limestone Alps

The Bavarian Prealps (German: Bayerische Voralpen) are a mountain range within the Northern Limestone Alps along the Austria–Germany border. They include the Bavarian Prealp region between the river Loisach to the west and the river Inn to the east; the range is about 80 kilometres (50 mi) long and 20–30 kilometres (12–19 mi) wide. The term is not defined politically, but alpine-geographically because, although the range is mostly located in Bavaria, southeast Germany, small areas of the Bavarian Prealps lie in the state of Tyrol (e.g. the Hinteres Sonnwendjoch south of the Rotwand), Austria.

The term is not to be confused with the Bavarian Alps or the Bavarian Alpine Foreland. These terms include the whole of the alpine region (together with parts of the Wetterstein, the Karwendel, etc.) and the whole Alpine Foreland on Bavarian state territory.

Except in the Ester Mountains in the extreme west, the summits of the Bavarian Prealps are all below 2000 metres in height and only a few have prominent limestone cliffs.

== Extent ==
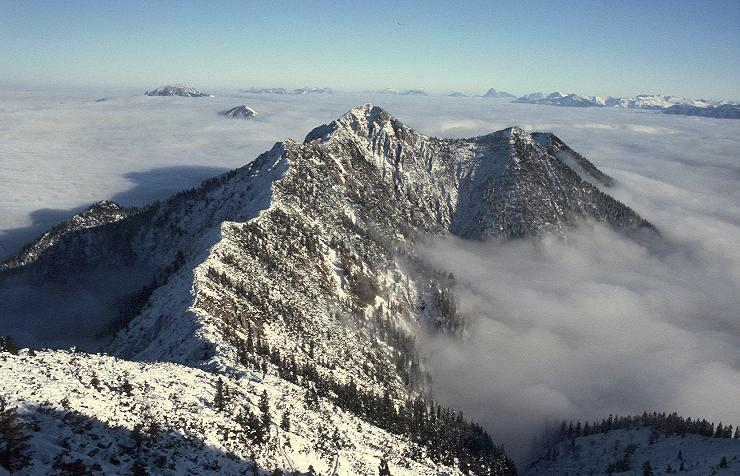
The Herzogstand (1731 m) from the Heimgarten

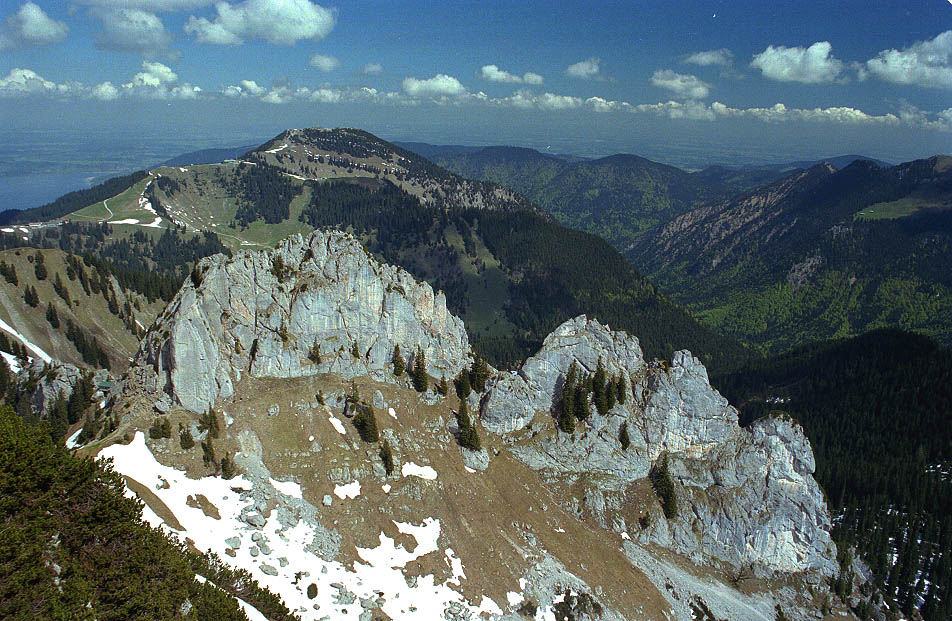
The Plankenstein (1768 m) from the Risserkogel

According to the 1984 classification of the Eastern Alps by the German Alpine Club the Bavarian Prealps are delineated as follows: Prealp region from Murnau via Kochel am See, Bad Tölz to Rosenheim – Inn to Kiefersfelden – Kieferbach – Glemmbach – Ellbach – Kaiserhaus (in Brandenberg) – Brandenberger Ache – Erzherzog-Johann-Klause (at the Brandenberger Ache) – Sattelbach – Ampelsbach – Achenbach – Walchen – Isar to Krün – Kranzbach – Kankerbach – Garmisch-Partenkirchen – Loisach to Murnau.

=== Subdivision ===
The westernmost part of the Bavarian Prealps is formed by the Ester Mountains and its highest peak, the Krottenkopf (2,086 metres/6,844 ft), which is also the highest summit in the Prealps. To the northeast the range is enclosed by the Herzogstand and Heimgarten and the long ridge of the Benediktenwand. The eastern part of the Prealps between the rivers Isar and Inn is known as the Mangfall Mountains, because its streams – the Rottach, Weißach, Schlierach and Leitzach – all flow into the Mangfall river, which drains the whole area and forming an important groundwater store for the city of Munich. The highest peak in the eastern part of the Bavarian Prealps – located on Austrian state territory in spite of the name – is the Hinteres Sonnwendjoch at 1,986 metres/6,516 ft above sea level.

=== Neighbouring mountain ranges ===
The Bavarian Prealps border the following mountain ranges in the Alps:

- Chiemgau Alps (to the east)
- Kaiser Mountains (to the southeast)
- Brandenberg Alps (to the south)
- Karwendel (to the south)
- Wetterstein mountains (to the southwest)
- Ammergau Alps (to the west)

To the north the Bavarian Prealps border on the Alpine Foreland.

== Notable peaks ==
- Benediktenwand
- Bischof
- Heimgarten
- Herzogstand
- Hinteres Sonnwendjoch
- Hirschberg
- Karwendel
- Krottenkopf
- Neureuth
- Plankenstein
- Rechelkopf
- Risserkogel
- Roßstein and Buchstein
- Rotwand
- Schliersberg
- Seekarkreuz

== Tourism ==
=== Mountain climbing ===
Many peaks in the Bavarian Prealps are part of Munich's Hausbergen ("home mountains") and may be climbed all year round on foot, by ski mountaineers or with snowshoes. There are good and simple, even family-friendly, routes to most of the summits. Several also offer scenic, generally well-protected climbing routes across a wide range of climbing grades (UIAA II to X): the Roßstein and Buchstein, Plankenstein (Direkter Ostgrat: IV+, Nadel Südwand: X), Ruchenköpfe (Münchner Riß: III, Dülfer Riß: IV). A ski touring classic is the Rotwand-Reib'n, which runs up to the Rotwand.

=== Long-distance hiking trails ===
The Via Alpina, a cross-border long-distance trail with five route sections, runs over the entire Alps, including the Bavarian Prealps.

The Violette Way of the Via Alpina runs in 9 stages through the Bavarian Prealps as follows:

- Stage A51 runs from Oberaudorf to the Brünnsteinhaus
- Stage A52 runs from the Brünnsteinhaus to the Rotwandhaus via the Ursprungtal
- Stage A53 runs from the Rotwandhaus to Sutten via the Spitzingsee
- Stage A54 runs from Sutten to Kreuth via the Risserkogel
- Stage A55 runs from Kreuth to Lenggries via the Hirschberghütte and the Lenggrieser Hütte
- Stage A56 runs from Lenggries to the Tutzinger Hütte via the Brauneck
- Stage A57 runs from der Tutzinger Hütte to the Herzogstand via the Kesselberghöhe
- Stage A58 runs from the Herzogstand to the Weilheimer Hütte via Eschenlohe
- Stage A59 runs from der Weilheimer Hütte to Garmisch-Partenkirchen via the Wank

The Munich–Venice Dream Path (Traumpfad München–Venedig), first publicised in 1977, also runs through the Bavarian Prealps. Although it is not an official long-distance path, it has become well known because so many walking clubs and states were involved in its creation. The third section of the Dream Path runs from Geretsried to the Brauneck Gipfelhaus via Bad Tölz and Lenggries. Most of this stage is located in the Alpine Foreland. The fourth stage runs from the Brauneck-Gipfelhaus via the Benediktenwand in the Jachenau. The fifth stage runs from the Jachenau to Vorderriß, where the path enters the Karwendel. The end point is at Hinterriß.

In addition there is the Via Bavarica Tyrolensis, a 225-kilometre (140 mi) cycle path from Munich to the Tyrol (see main article).

== Gallery ==
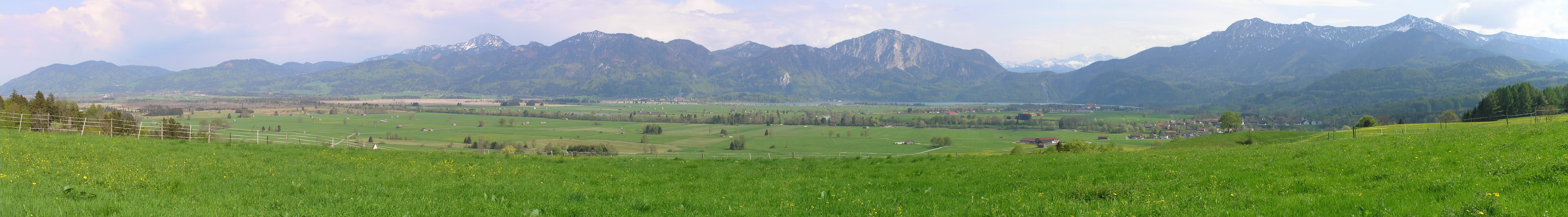
From the Benediktenwand to the Heimgarten
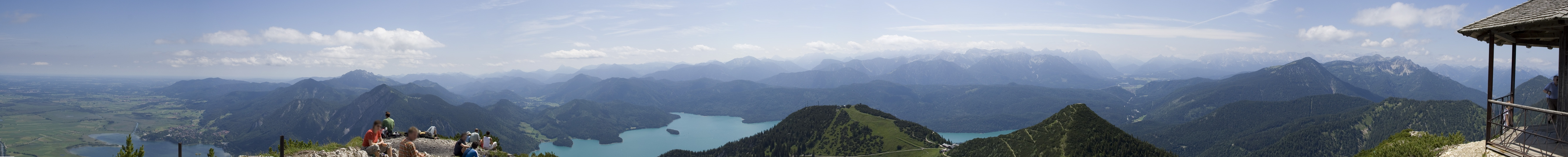
Panorama from the Herzogstand. From l. to r.: the Kochelsee, Benediktenwand, Walchensee, Herzogstandbahn top station, Western Karwendelspitze, Wallgau/Mittenwald, Wetterstein Massif, Zugspitze, Ammer Mountains
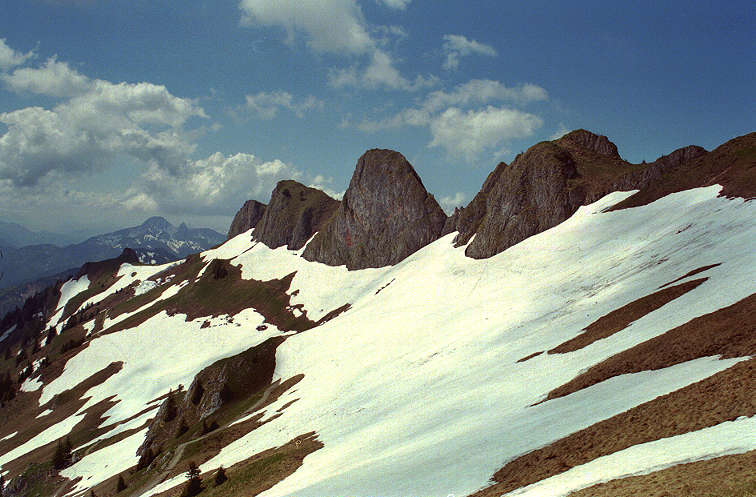
The Rotwand, Mangfall Mountains

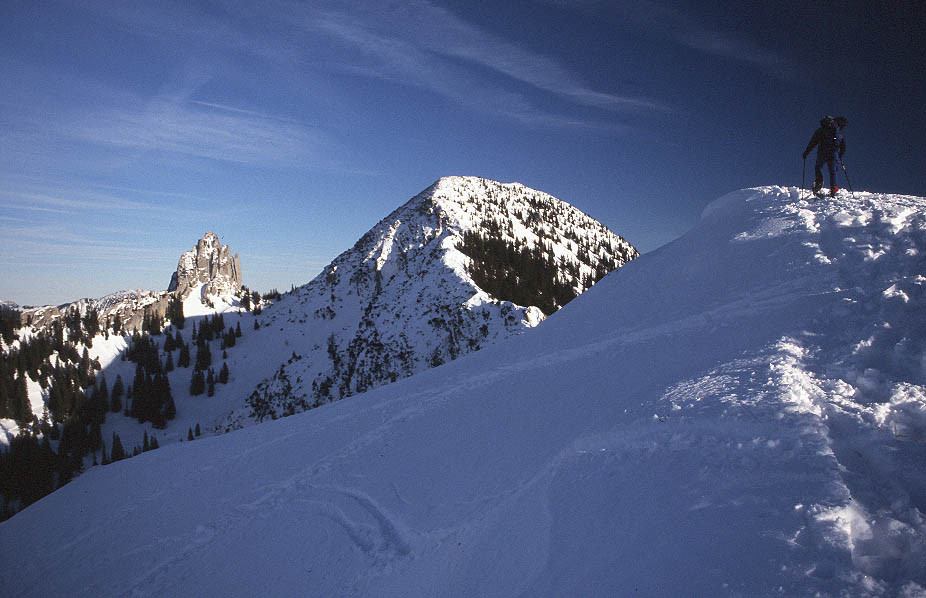
The Plankenstein and Risserkogel, Tegernsee Mountains

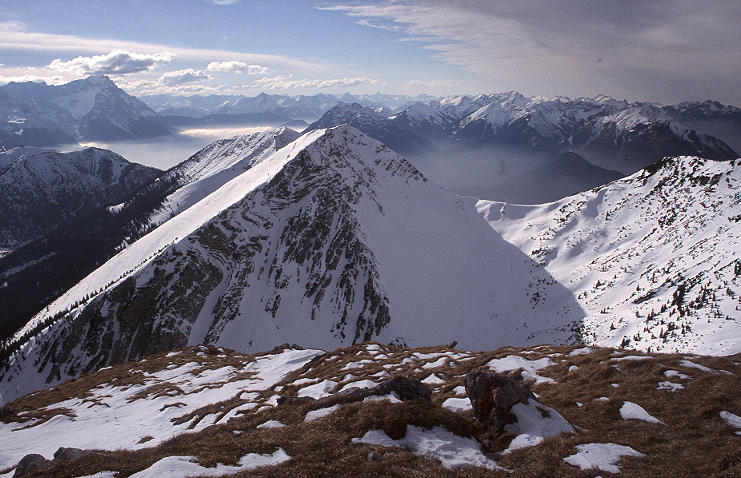
View of the Bischof (2,033 m/6,670 ft) looking southwest from the Krottenkopf (2,086 m/6,844 ft), Ester Mountains

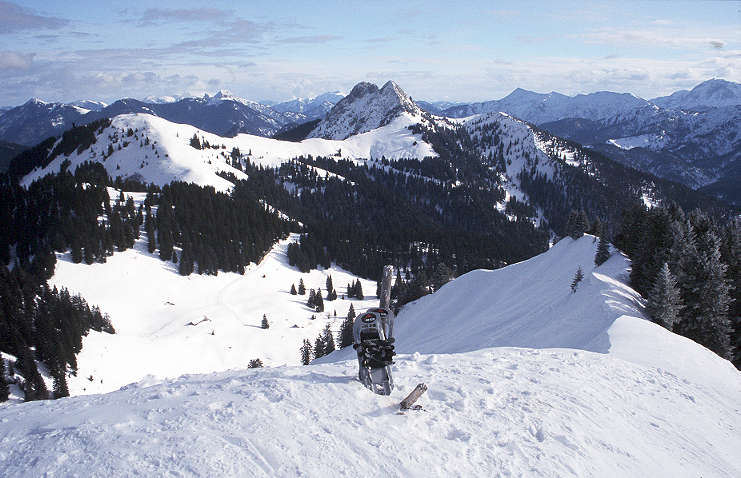
The Roß- and Buchstein from the Schönberg

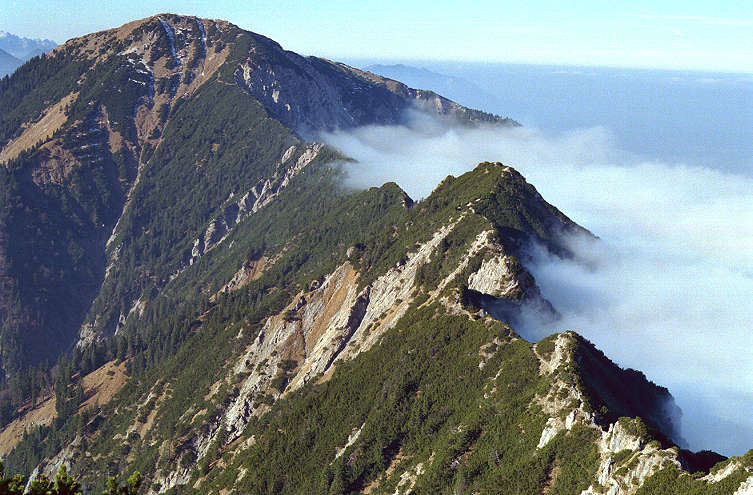
The Heimgarten (1,790 m/5,870 ft) from the Herzogstand

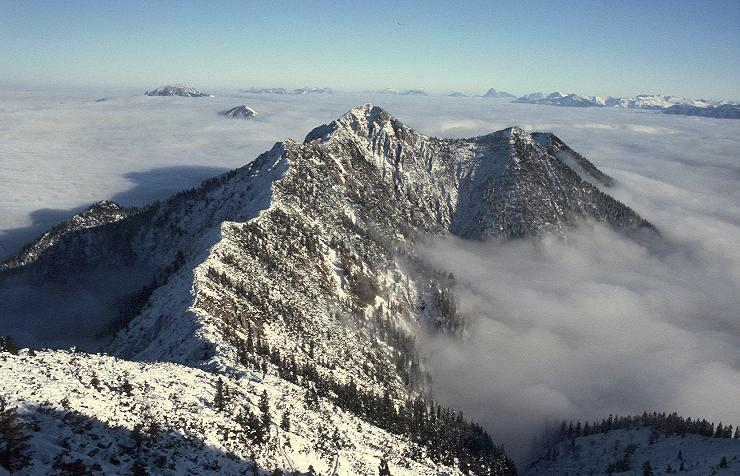
The Herzogstand (1,731 m/5,679 ft) from the Heimgarten

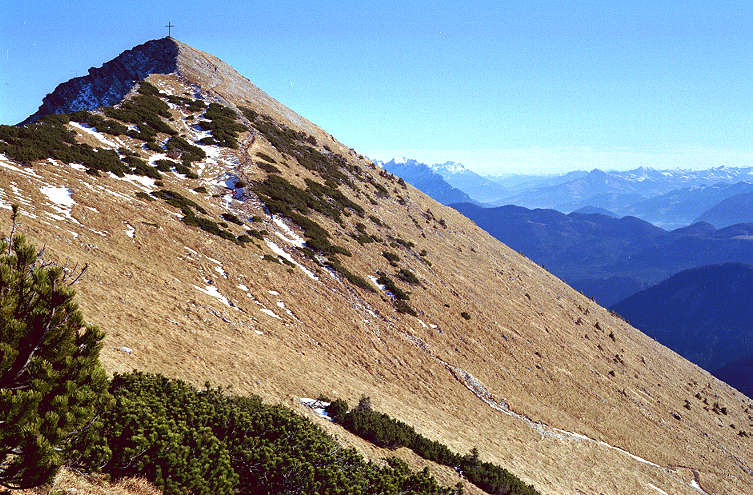
The Hinteres Sonnwendjoch (1,986 m/6,516 ft)

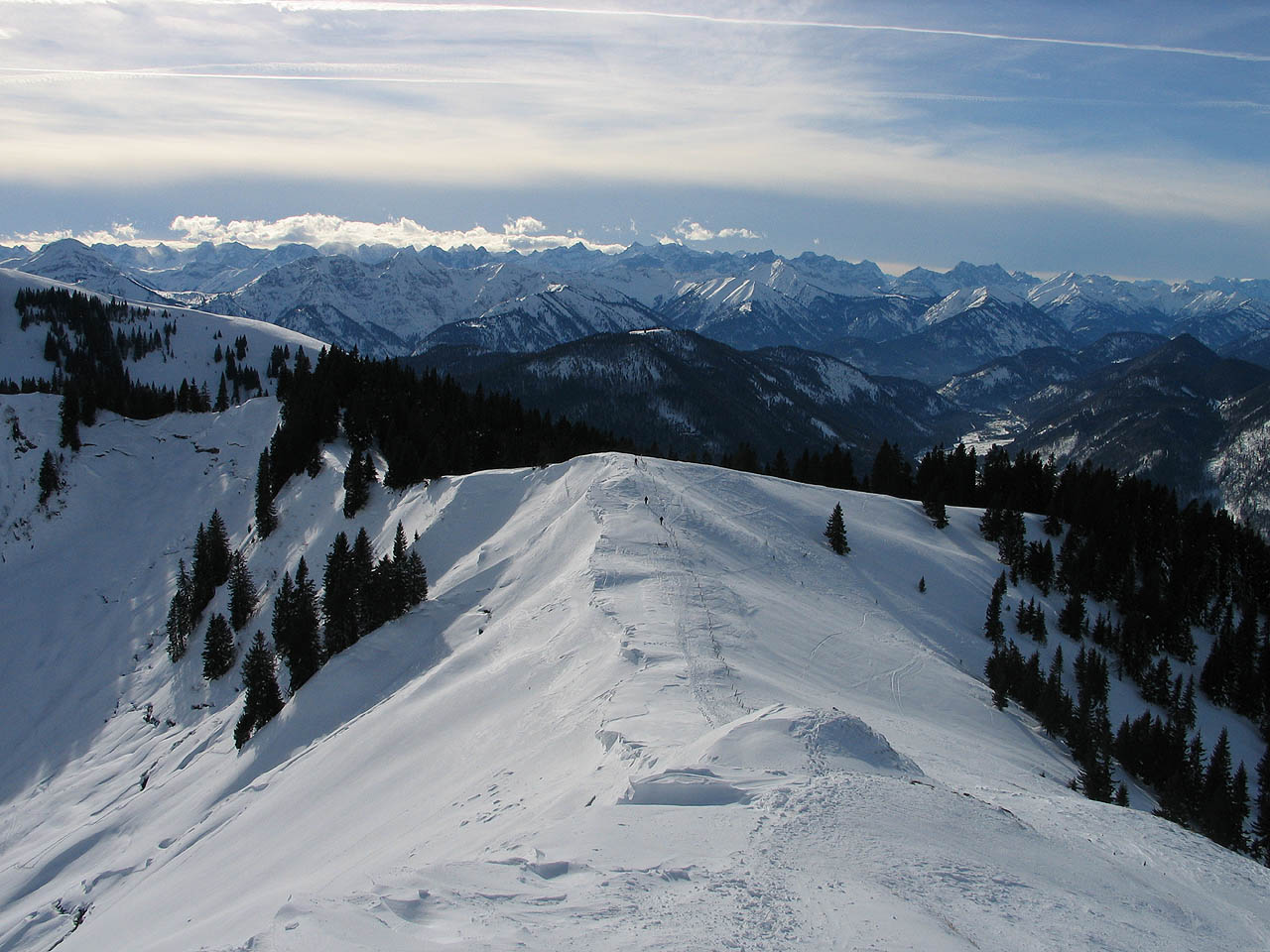
View of the Karwendel from the Seekarkreuz (1,601 m/5,253 ft)

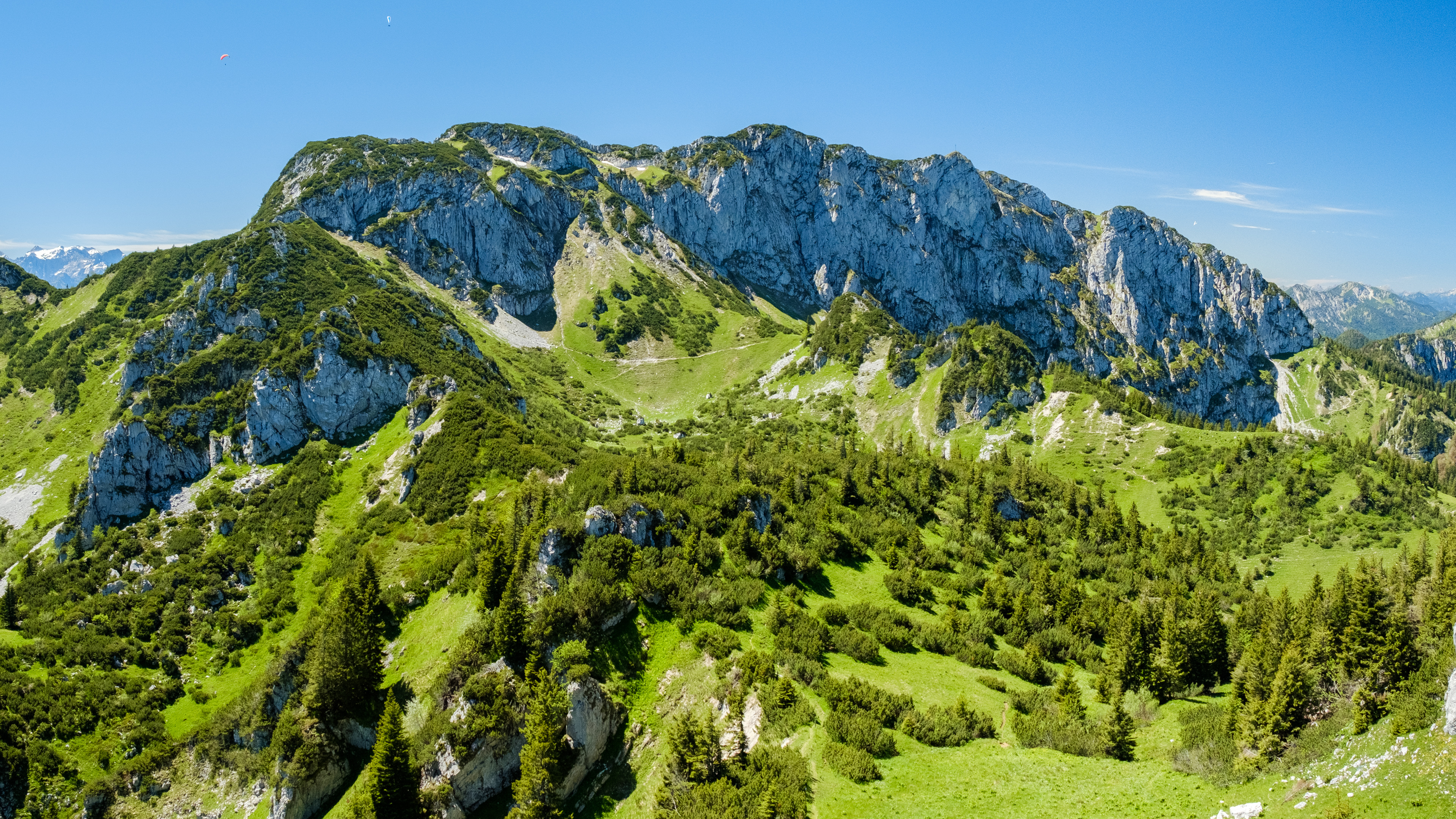
The north face of the Benediktenwand (1,800 m/5,900 ft)

== Sources ==
- German Alpine Club (DAV): Alpenvereins-Jahrbuch "Berg '84": Die Einteilung der Ostalpen
- M. u. E. Zebhauser: Alpenvereinsführer Bayerische Voralpen Ost, Rother-Verlag, 1992, ISBN 3-7633-1120-3
- Bernd Ritschel/Malte Roeper: Bayerische Alpen zwischen Oberammergau und Bayrischzell with articles by Hermann Magerer, Michael Pause, Hans Steinbichler et al., 1st edn., 2001, Rother-Verlag, ISBN 3-7633-7505-8
