= Neureut =

Neureut may refer to:

- Neureut (Karlsruhe), a borough of Karlsruhe, Baden-Württemberg
- Neureuth (mountain), a mountain in Bavaria
