= Hoher Fricken =

Coordinates: 47°32′N 11°09′E

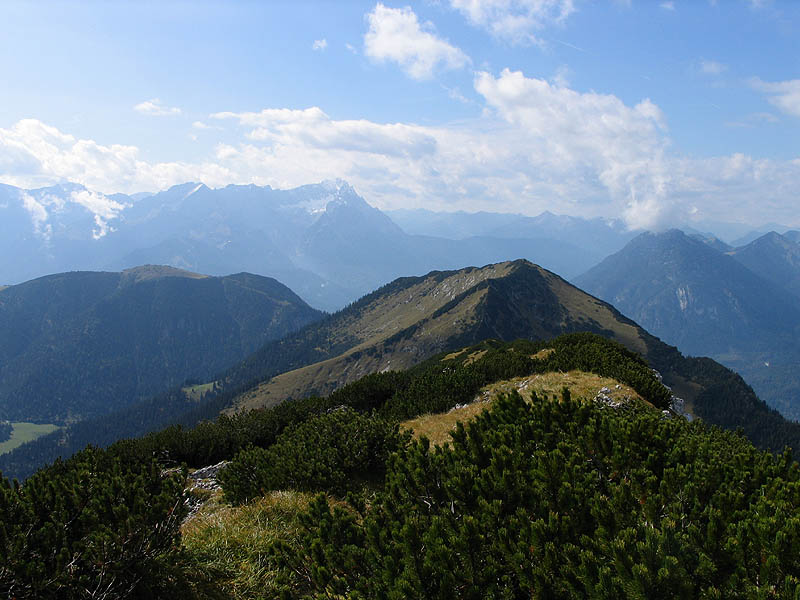

Highest point
- Elevation: 1,940 m (6,360 ft)

Geography
- Location: Bavaria, Germany

The Hoher Fricken ("High Fricken") is a mountain 1,940 m above sea level (NHN) high, in the Ester Mountains in the Bavarian Prealps and lies between the Wank and the over 2000 m high Bischof. Below and to the north is the Niederer Fricken ("Low Fricken", 1,682 m above sea level (NHN)) and the Fricken Cirque (Frickenkar). The summit may be reached as a mountain hike from Oberau or from the swimming pool in Farchant (via the path to the Esterbergalm) or rather more steeply from Farchant on a route going past the Kuhflucht Waterfalls. Halfway up the climb via the Kuhflucht Falls lies the Fricken Cave. Hiking time in each case is about 4 hours.

Since the re-opening of the Farchant railway halt in December 2010 the Munich–Garmisch-Partenkirchen railway once again offers suitable crossing route options, e. g. Farchant – Hoher Fricken – Esterbergalm – Partenkirchen or Farchant – Hoher Fricken – Oberau.

== Gallery ==
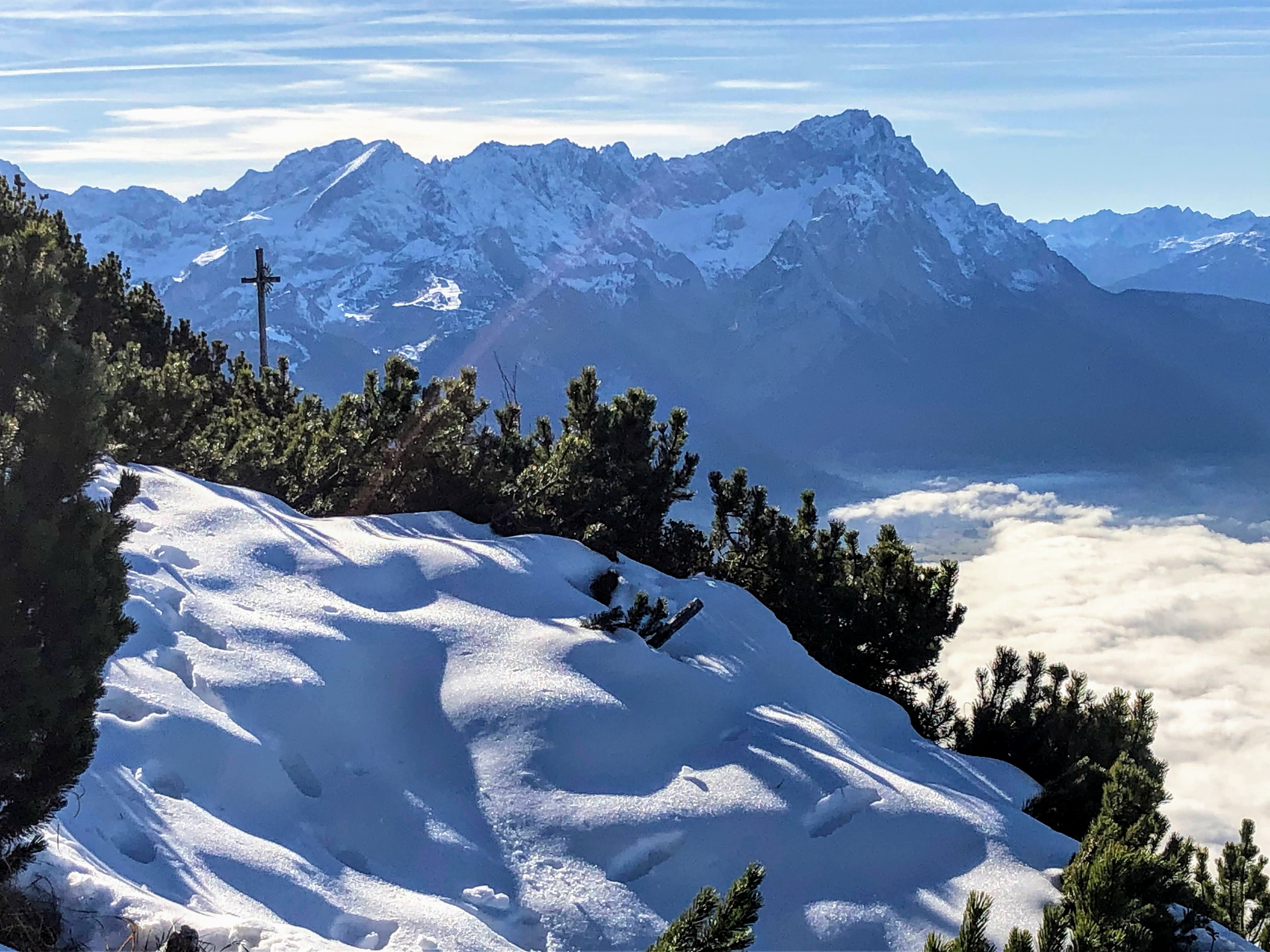
Summit cross and view of the Wetterstein
