= Schliersberg =

Mountain in Germany

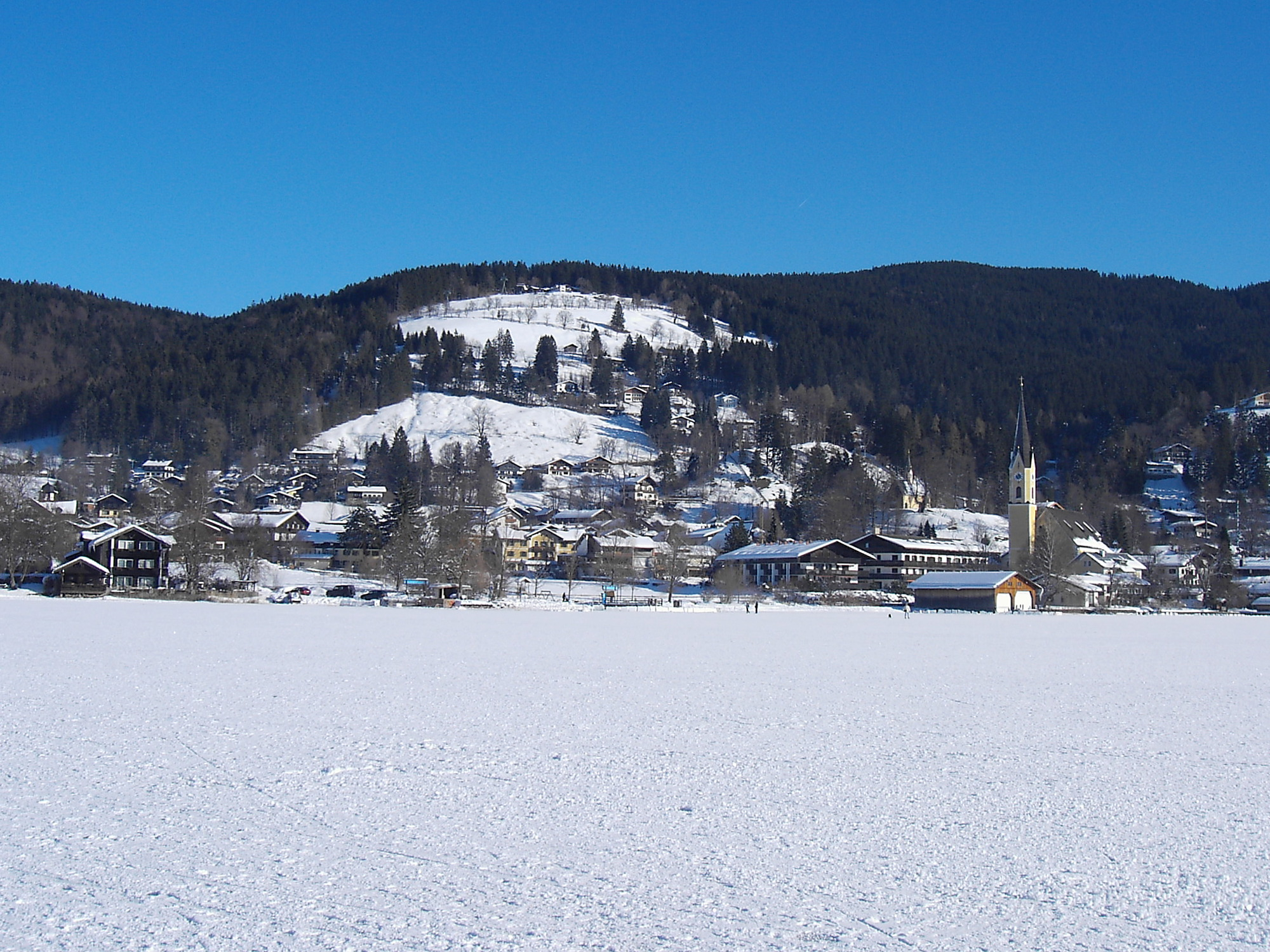

Highest point
- Elevation: 1,265 m (4,150 ft)
- Prominence: 199 m (653 ft)
- Isolation: 3.3 km
- Coordinates: 47°44′34″N 11°53′16″E

Geography
- Location within Bavaria Location within Germany
- Location: Bavaria, Germany
- Parent range: Bavarian Prealps, Northern Limestone Alps

The Schliersberg (also known as Rhonberg or Rohnberg) is a 1,265-metre-high (4,150 ft) mountain in the Bavarian Prealps above the village Schliersee (Miesbach district, Upper Bavaria) and Lake Schliersee. The wooded summit can be reached within a 1.5 hour hike and passes the hut Schliersbergalm, located 1,055 m above sea level, which can also be reached by a cable car since 1952.
