= Simetsberg (Ester Mountains) =

Mountain in Bavaria, Germany

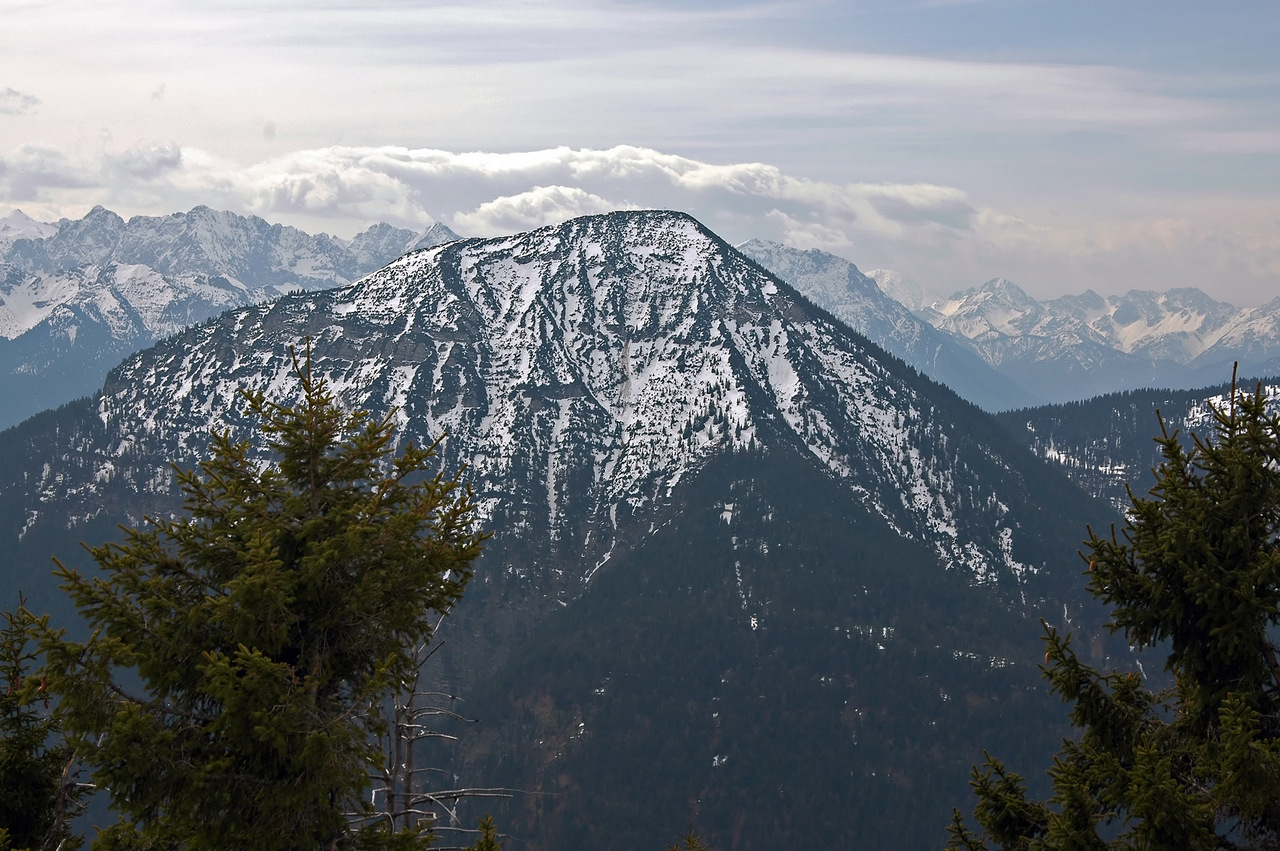
- Simetsberg from the north

Highest point
- Elevation: 1,840 m (6,040 ft)
- Coordinates: 47°34′03″N 11°15′18″E

Geography
- Location within Germany
- Location: Bavaria, Germany
- Parent range: Ester Mountains

Simetsberg (elevation 1,840 metres/6,040 ft) is a mountain in the Bavarian Prealps of southern Germany. An isolated peak, it forms the eastern end of the Ester Mountains.
