= Krottenkopf =

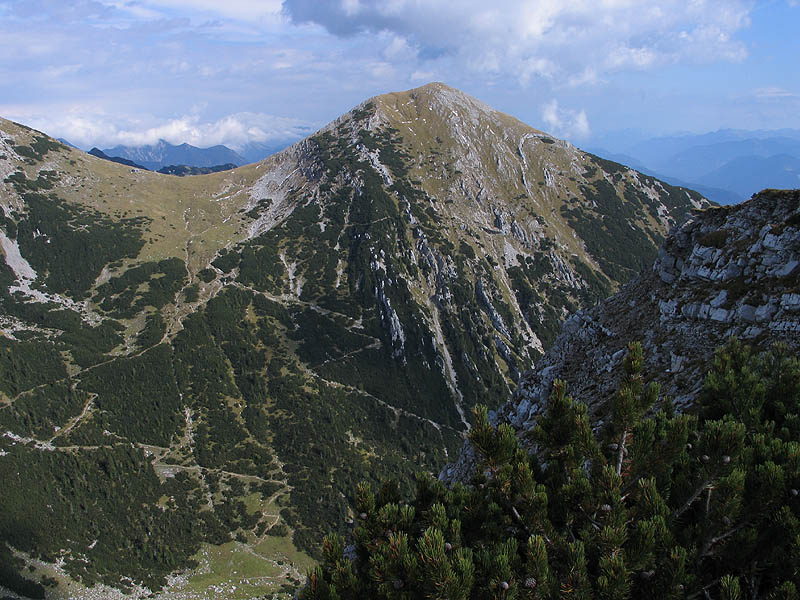
- The Krottenkopf (2,086 m) from the Bischof (2033 m)

Highest point
- Elevation: 2,086 m above sea level (NN) (6,844 ft)
- Prominence: 1,156 m
- Coordinates: 47°32′43″N 11°11′34″E

Geography
- Location within Bavaria
- Location: Bavaria, Germany
- Parent range: Ester Mountains

Geology
- Rock age: Triassic
- Mountain type(s): Oberrät Limestone in the summit region, otherwise Main Dolomite

Climbing
- Normal route: Partenkirchen – Esterberg Alm – Weilheimer Hut – Krottenkopf

The Krottenkopf (German pronunciation: [ˈkʁɔtənˌkɔpf]), 2,086 metres/6,844 ft, is a peak in the Ester Mountains and the highest mountain in the Bavarian Prealps. It lies within the Bavarian district of Garmisch-Partenkirchen.

== Location and climbing options ==
It lies in the westernmost part of the Bavarian Prealps in the Ester Mountains near the town of Garmisch-Partenkirchen. Immediately below and a half an hour from the summit is the Weilheimer Hut (1,955 metres/6,414 ft), the highest Alpine Club hut in the Bavarian Prealps.

There are four climbing options:

- From Oberau a very steep climb, the Oberauer Steig, follows narrow mountain paths via the Frickenboden and later runs past the Bischof mountain, which is also over 2,000 metres high, but less well known. This climb requires about 4 hours.
- From Klais another path runs via the Krüner Alm (1,620 metres/5,310 ft) and the Michelfeld
- From Garmisch-Partenkirchen and Farchant the route goes via the Esterbergalm taking about 4½ hours to reach the top of the Krottenkopf.
- In addition, there is the even longer climb from Eschenlohe past the 1,922-metre/6,306 ft Hohe Kisten to the summit.

== Gallery ==
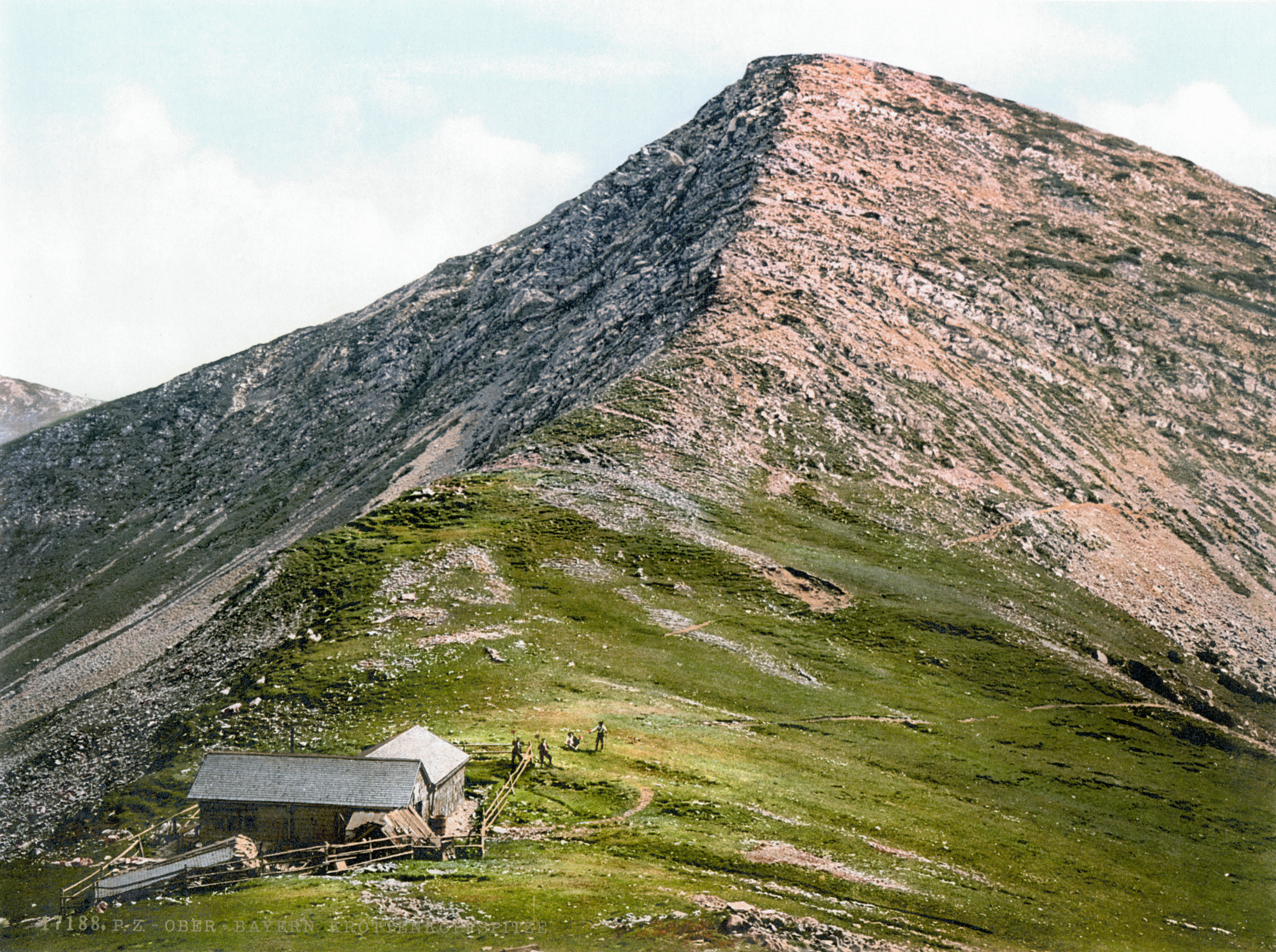
The Krottenkopf around 1900

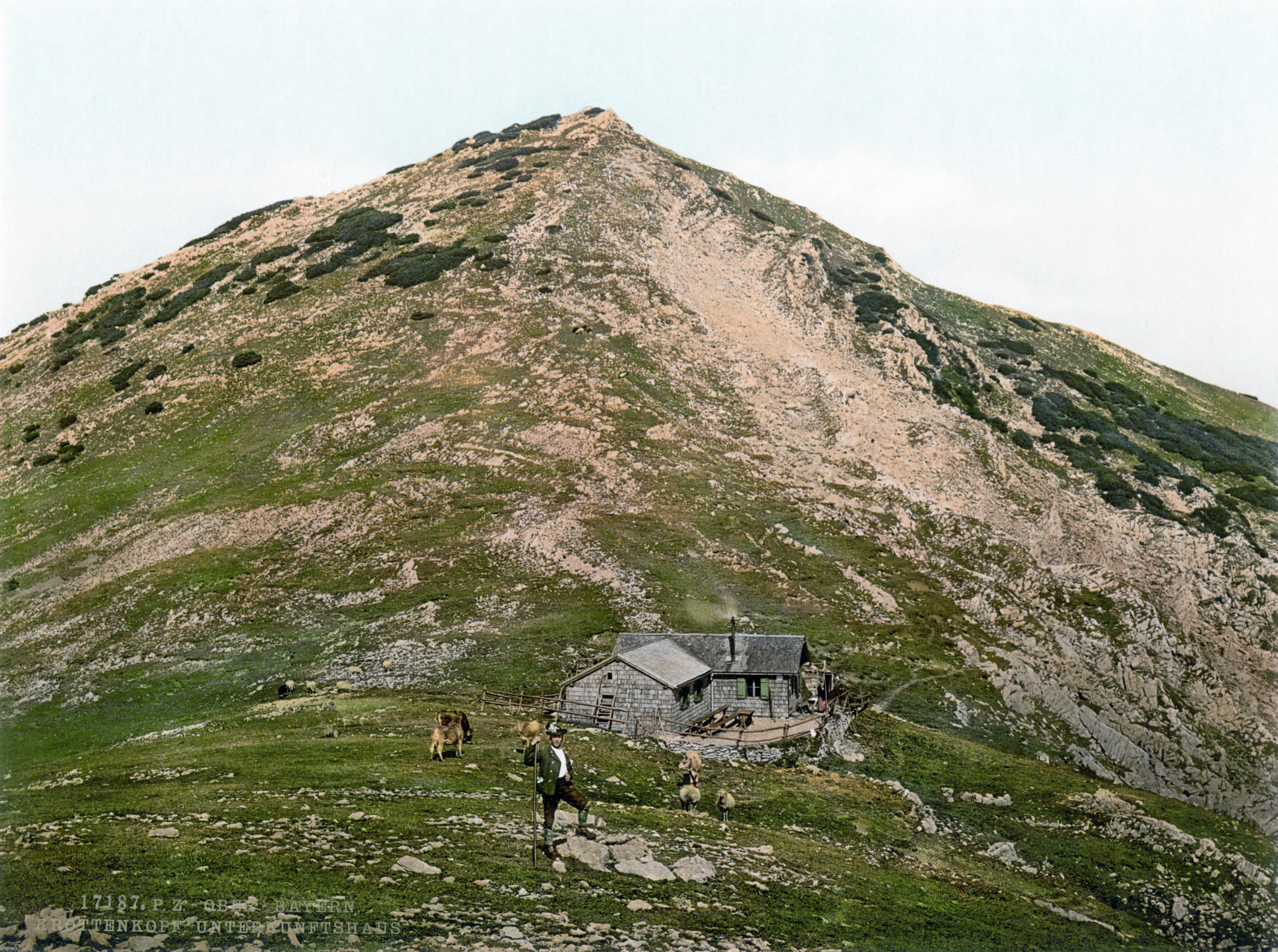
View from the Krottenkopf to the Kareck around 1900

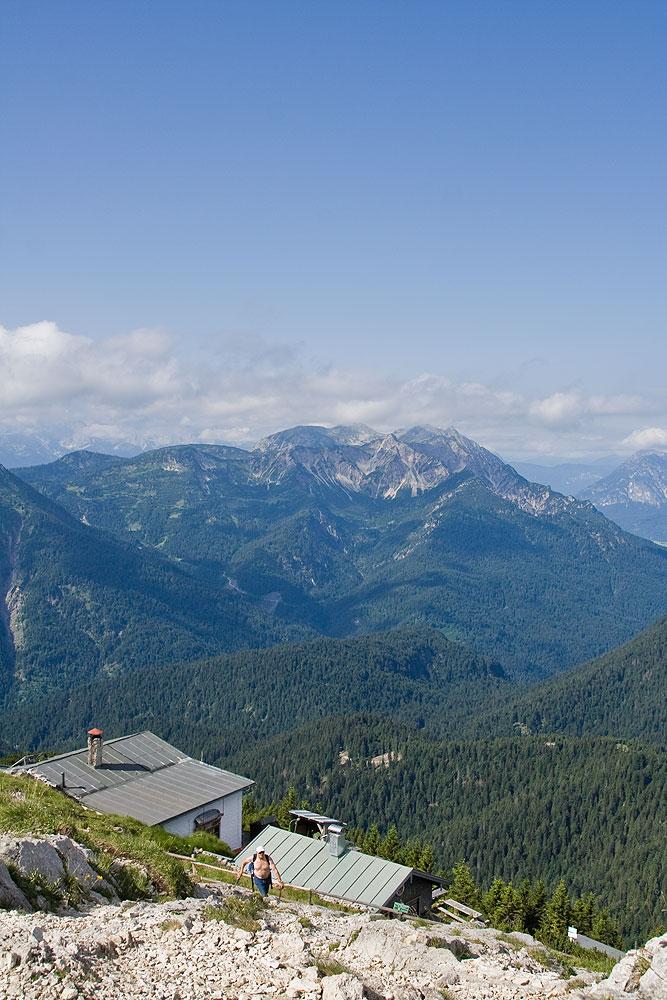
View from Heimgarten. Foreground: the Heimgarten Hut

== See also ==
- List of mountains of the Alps
- List of Alpine peaks by prominence
