= Hohe Kisten =

Mountain in the Bavarian Prealps in Germany

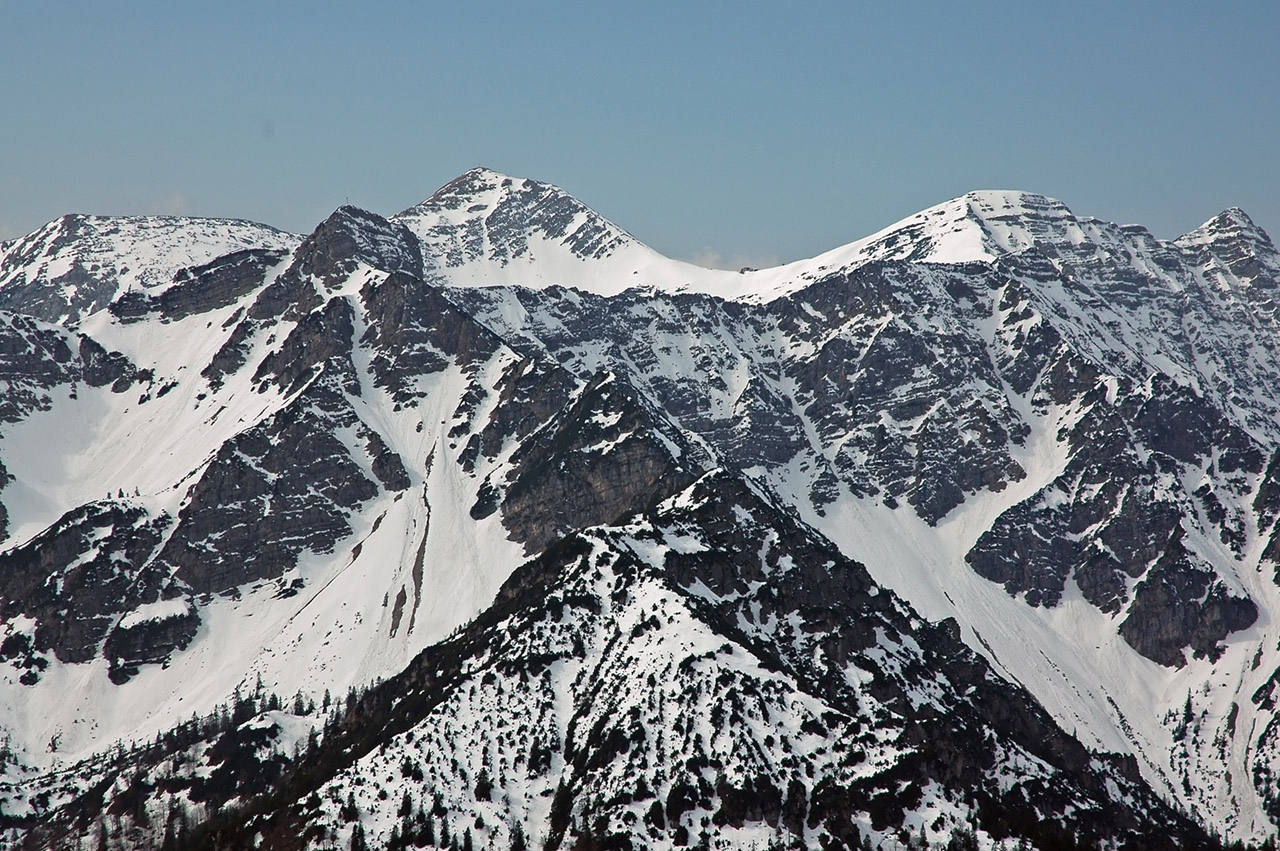
- Hohe Kisten North Face (front left). Behind: the Krottenkopf

Highest point
- Elevation: 1,922 m above sea level (NN) (6,306 ft)
- Coordinates: 47°33′43″N 11°12′33″E

Geography
- Location within Bavaria
- Location: Bavaria, Germany
- Parent range: Ester Mountains

Climbing
- Normal route: Wallgau – Wildsee – Hohe Kisten

The Hohe Kisten is a mountain, 1,922 m above sea level (NN), in the Ester range in the Bavarian Prealps and lies north of the Krottenkopf – the main summit of the Ester range.

The Hohe Kisten is a mountain with two distinct sides: a rocky northern side on which the summit section looks like a large box (German: Kiste = box), and a gentle southern side on which the summit barely stands out at all.

The summit may be reached on a straightforward mountain touring route from Wallgau. The climb from Eschenlohe into the Loisach valley through the Puster valley requires endurance and sure-footedness. Another approach is along the route near the arête from the Weilheimer Hut (1,946 m). For this one, it is worth considering using the Hohe Kisten as a crossing point: for example on a very long day tour from Eschenlohe via the Hohe Kisten and Weilheimer Hut to Oberau (using the Munich–Garmisch-Partenkirchen railway) or as part of a longer tour through the Ester Mountains.

In the 1970s it was planned to build a cable car from Eschenlohe to the summit of the Hohe Kisten, The project, which also envisaged several ski lifts, failed due to opposition from the German Nature Conservation Federation, Bund Naturschutz.

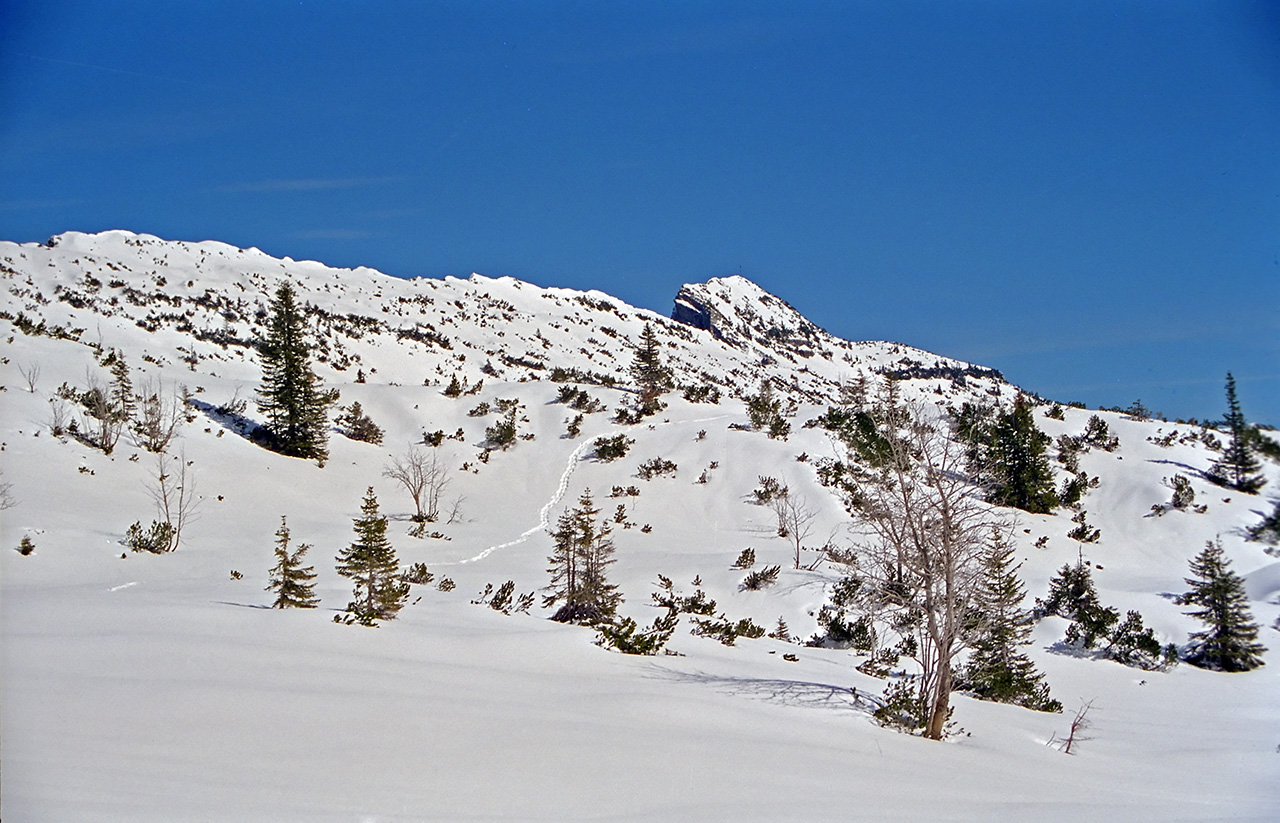
The small summit triangle on the Hohe Kisten from the south.
