= Rottach-Egern =

- Municipality
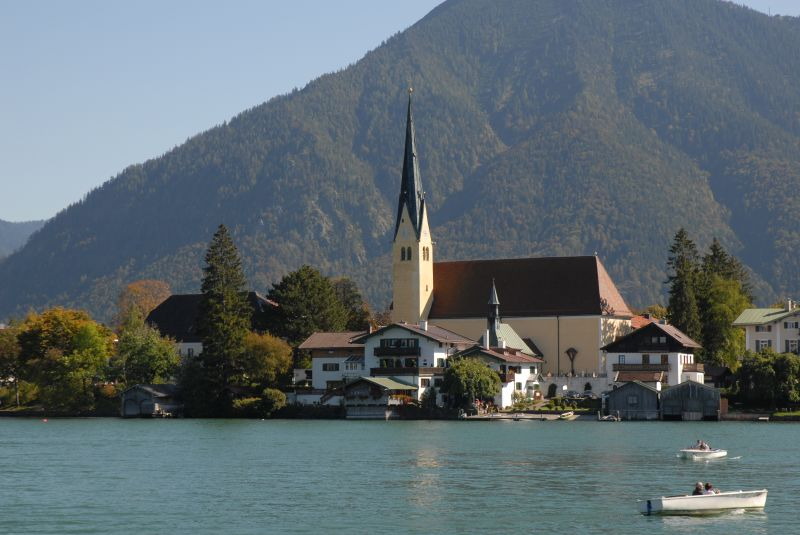
- Church of St. Laurentius

- Coat of arms

- Location of Rottach-Egern within Miesbach district
- Interactive map of Rottach-Egern
- Location within Germany Location within Bavaria
- Coordinates: 47°42′N 11°46′E
- Country: Germany
- State: Bavaria
- Admin. region: Oberbayern
- District: Miesbach
- Subdivisions: 19 Ortsteile

Government
  - Mayor (2020–26): Christian Köck

Area
  - Total: 59.10 km^{2} (22.82 sq mi)
- Elevation: 736 m (2,415 ft)

Population (2025-12-31)
  - Total: 5,492
  - Density: 92.93/km^{2} (240.7/sq mi)
- Time zone: UTC+01:00 (CET)
  - Summer (DST): UTC+02:00 (CEST)
- Postal codes: 83700
- Dialling codes: 08022
- Vehicle registration: MB
- Website: www.rathaus-rottach-egern.de

Rottach-Egern municipality in Miesbach, Bavaria

Rottach-Egern (German pronunciation: [ˈʁɔtax ˈeːɡɐn]) is a municipality (Gemeinde Rottach-Egern am Tegernsee) and town located at Lake Tegernsee in the district of Miesbach in Upper Bavaria, Germany, about 55 km (35 miles) south of central Munich. Late Austrian actor Walter Slezak is buried in this area.

== Geography ==
Rottach-Egern is located in the Tegernsee Valley, stretching southward from the shore of Lake Tegernsee to the Austrian border. The villages of Rottach, Egern, Gasse, Schorn, Sonnenmoos, Staudach, Weißach and Wolfsgrub have merged to become parts of a single settlement near the lake. More hamlets in the municipality are Berg, Ellmau, Hagrain, Haslau, Kalkofen, Oberach, Sutten and Trinis, Brandstatt, Enterrottach, Erlach, Kühzagl and Unterwallberg.

In addition to the shoreline of the Tegernsee, the municipal area includes other small lakes of which Widrigsee (also Glocknersee), the Suttensee, the Riederecksee and Röthensteiner lakes are the main ones. The principal mountain range is part of the Mangfallgebirge, of which the Wallberg, at 1,722 metres (5,650 ft), with a cable car, is a venue for skiing, paragliding and the Wallenberg toboggan run.

The administrative center is in Rottach. The Catholic parish church of St. Lawrence is located in the district of Egern.

=== Population ===
Year	1939	1959	1970	1990	2011
Population (Primary residence)	2,827	5,117	5,240	5,656	5,578

In 2011 there were also 1,228 people with a second home in the municipality, desirable for discretion.

=== Neighboring communities ===
- Bad Wiessee
- Gmund am Tegernsee
- Kreuth
- Stadt Tegernsee
- Schliersee

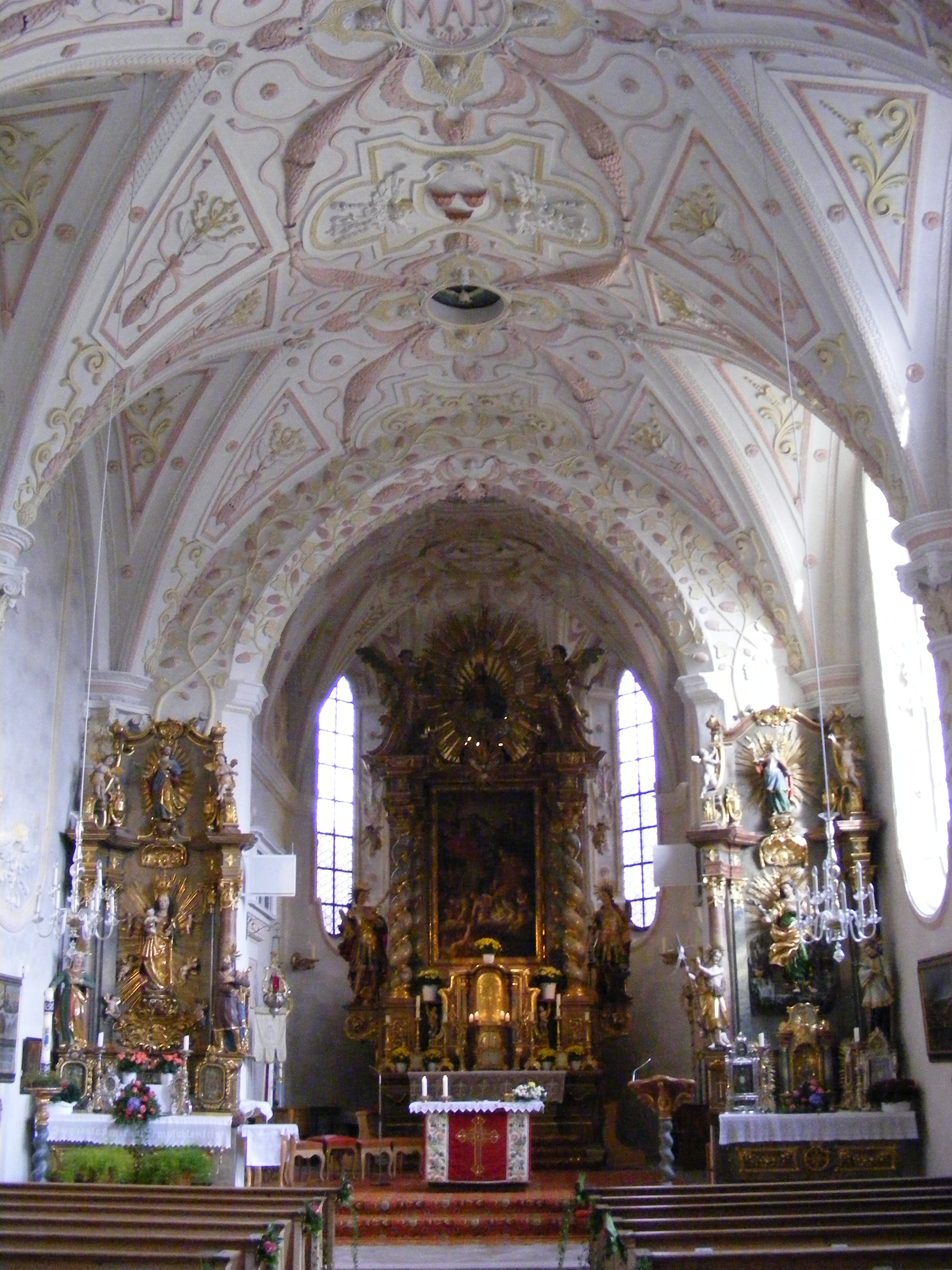
Interior of St. Laurentius church
