= Hinteres Sonnwendjoch =

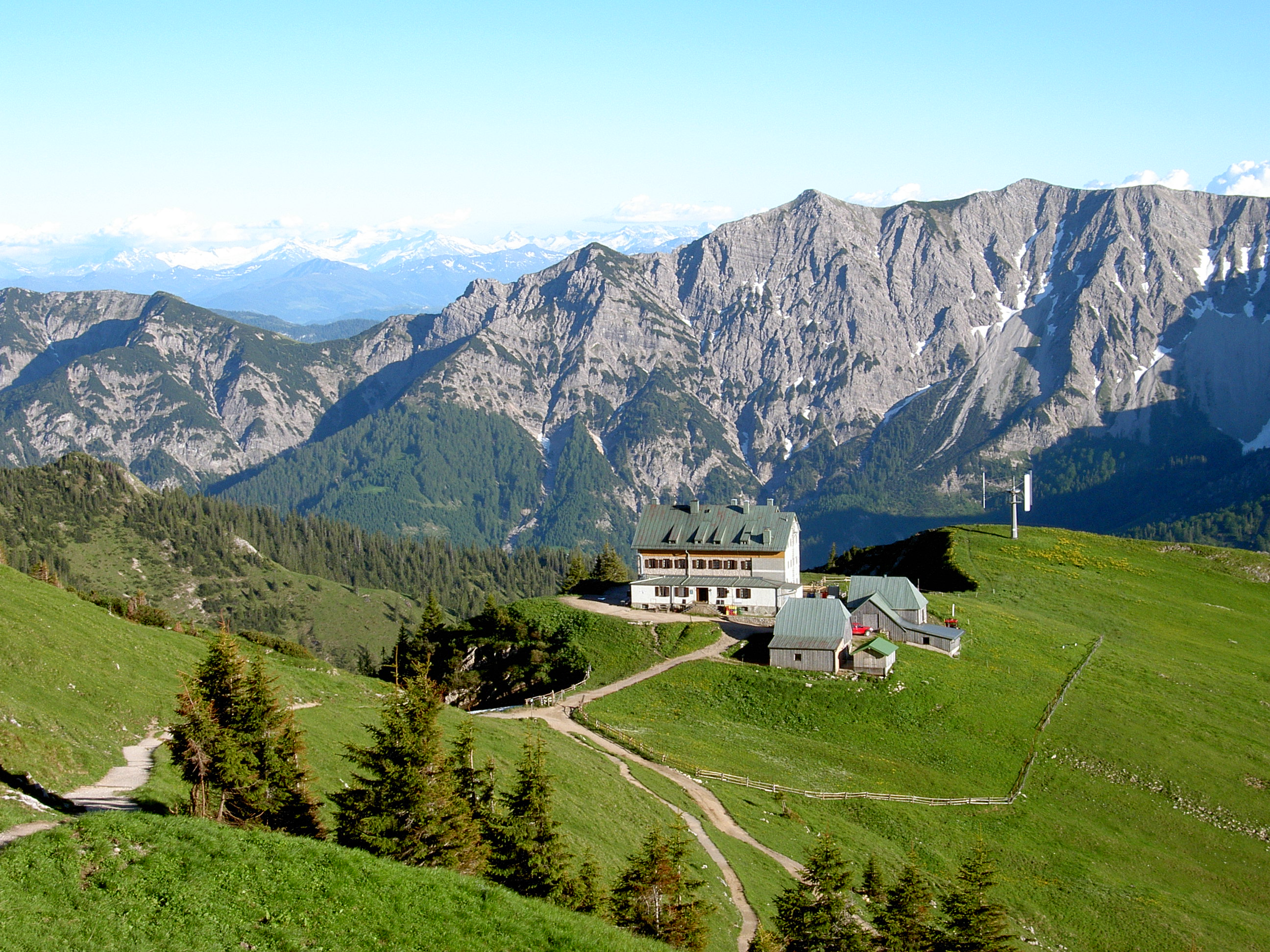
- North side of the Hinterer Sonnwendjoch with the Rotwandhaus

Highest point
- Elevation: 1,986 m (AA) (6,516 ft)
- Prominence: 1,986-1,031 m ↓ Wechsel
- Isolation: 13.0 km → Guffert
- Coordinates: 47°35′54″N 11°56′58″E

Geography
- Location within Austria
- Location: Tyrol, Austria
- Parent range: Mangfall Mountains, Bavarian Prealps

Geology
- Rock age: Upper Carnian - Norian
- Rock type(s): main dolomite, plattenkalk

The Hinteres Sonnwendjoch in the Austrian state of Tyrol is a mountain, 1,986 m (AA), and the highest peak of the Mangfall range, a subdivision of the Bavarian Prealps. Because the Brandenberg Alps to the south are lower, its summit offers outstanding views of the Central Alps despite its low elevation. The Hinterer Sonnwendjoch drops away steeply to the north into the Grund. The summit is made of main dolomite and, on the south side, of plattenkalk.

A long, but easy mountain hike from Valepp (890 m) in Bavaria leads up to the Bärenbadalm (1,590 m) and on to the summit. Considerably shorter, but also easy is the climb from Ackernalm (1,383 m) south of the massif, which is easily reached on the toll road from Bayrischzell or Kufstein.

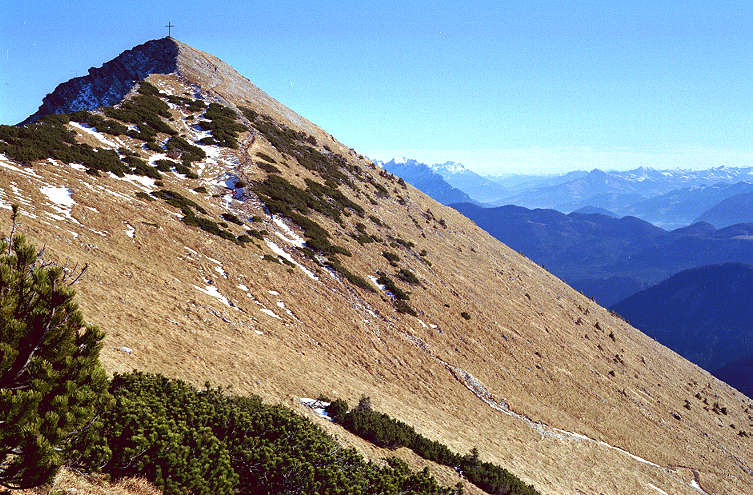
Summit of the Hinterer Sonnwendjoch from the southwest

== Summit panorama ==
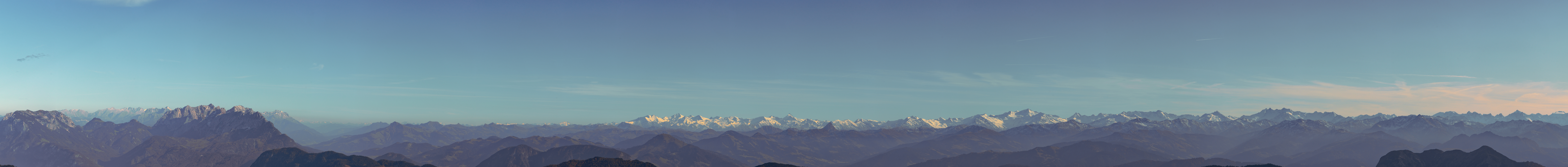
A panoramic view from the summit of the Hinteres Sonnwendjoch showing the Kaiser Mountains on the left, the High Tauern in the center and parts of the Zillertaler Alps on the right.
