= Bischof (mountain) =

Mountain in Germany

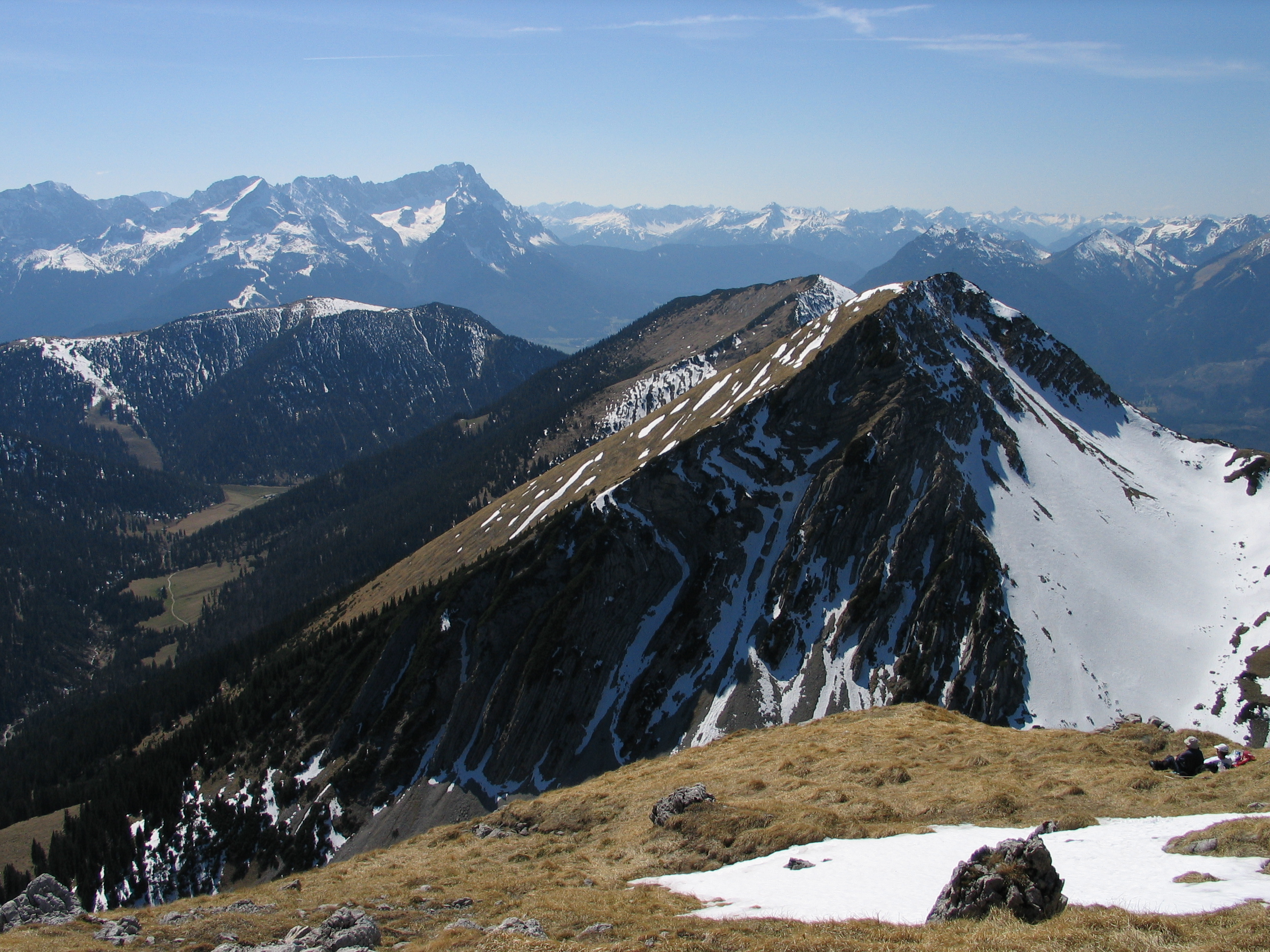
- The Bischof from the Krottenkopf

Highest point
- Elevation: 2,033 m above sea level (NN) (6,670 ft)
- Prominence: 150 m (490 ft)
- Isolation: 0,9 km→ Kareck
- Coordinates: 47°32′26″N 11°10′33″E

Geography
- Location within Bavaria
- Location: Bavaria, Germany
- Parent range: Ester Mountains

Geology
- Rock age: Triassic

Climbing
- Normal route: Oberau

The Bischof (2,033 metres) is a mountain peak in the Bavarian Prealps of southern Germany.

It lies in the westernmost part of the Bavarian Prealps in the Ester Mountains near Garmisch-Partenkirchen.

The usual climb to the top runs from Oberau via the Oberauer Steig to the saddle between the Bischof and the Hoher Fricken and on over the western ridge on good tracks through the Latschen to the summit (a total of about 3.5 hours climb).

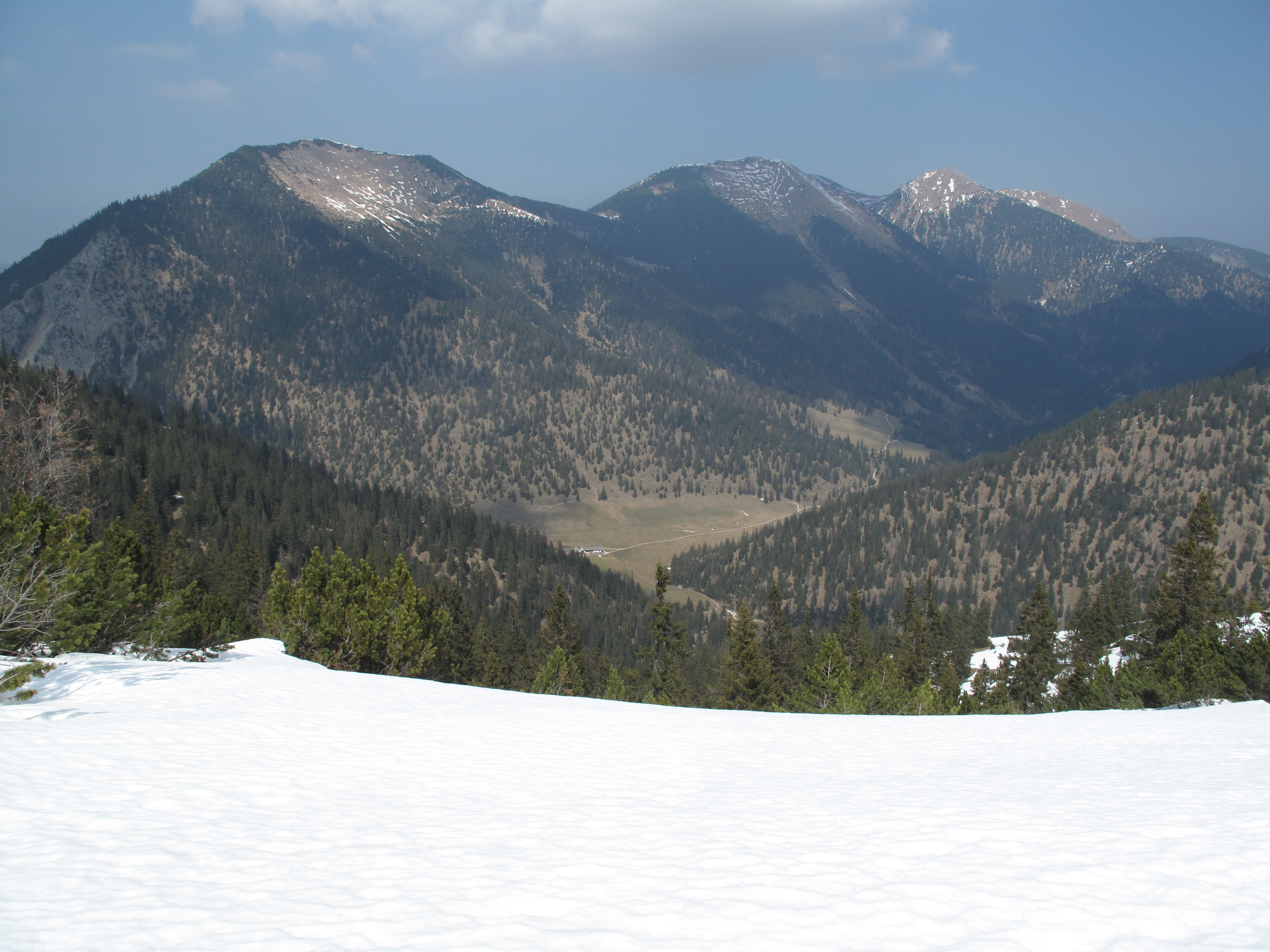
The Hoher Fricken, Bischof and Krottenkopf from the Wank
