= Risserkogel =

Mountain in Bavaria, Germany

Coordinates: 47°38′17″N 11°48′15″E

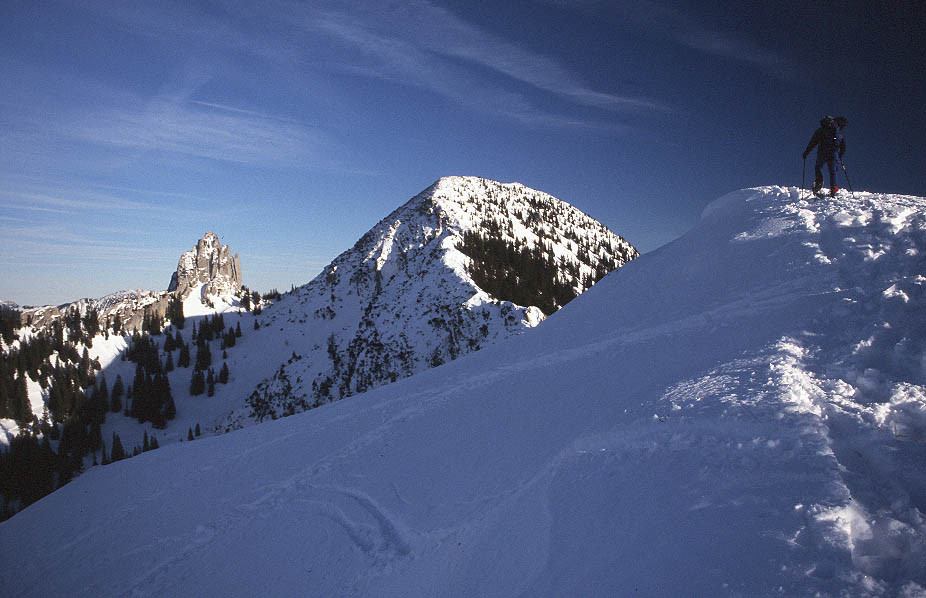
- Plankenstein (left) and Risserkogel (middle) in Winter

Highest point
- Elevation: 1,826 m (5,991 ft)

Geography
- Location: Bavaria, Germany

Risserkogel is a mountain of Bavaria, Germany.
