= Heimgarten (mountain) =

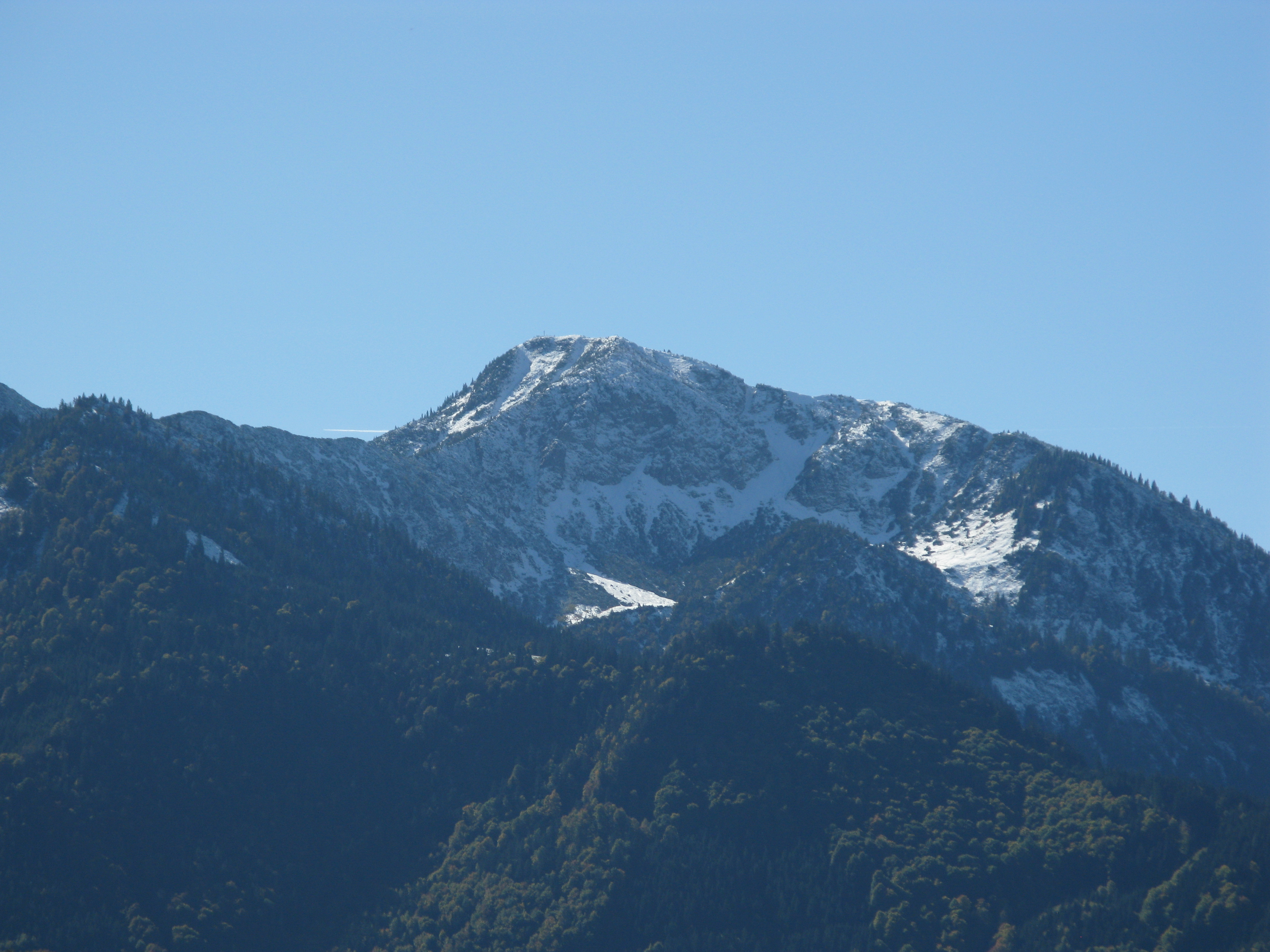
- Heimgarten

Highest point
- Elevation: 1,790 m (5,870 ft)
- Prominence: 889 m (2,917 ft)
- Coordinates: 47°36′49.2″N 11°16′27.6″E

Geography
- Location within Germany
- Location: Bavaria, Germany
- Parent range: Bavarian Prealps

Heimgarten (elevation 1,790 metres/5,870 ft) is a mountain near Ohlstadt in the Bavarian Prealps of southern Germany. It is connected via a ridge with Herzogstand (1,731 metres/5,679 ft) to the east.
