= Ester Mountains =

Mountain range in Germany

Coordinates: 47°31′N 11°11′E

The Ester Mountains (German: Estergebirge) are a small mountain range in Bavaria. They are classified either as part of Bavarian Prealps or the larger chain of Northern Limestone Alps. The range stretches for about 15 kilometres. From the west it is bordered by the valley of the river Loisach and from the east by Walchensee lake and the valley of the river Isar. With its highest peak being Krottenkopf (2,086 m), the highest part of the range just exceeds 2,000 m. The range is of composed of limestone. The treeline is around 1,700 m.

== Etymology ==
Probably from preceltic ester (cf. basque Ezterenzubi, occitan Esterel).

== Peaks ==
=== Most important summits ===
The most important summits in the Ester range are the Krottenkopf (2,086 m), the Bischof (2,033 m), the Hohe Kisten (1,922 m), the Hoher Fricken (1,940 m) and the Simetsberg (1,836 m). The climbs both from the Loisach valley as well as from Krün or Wallgau in the southeast are relatively long. As a result, the Ester Mountains are relatively quiet with the exception of the Wank mountain (1,780 m) which is accessible by cable car (the Wankbahn). Most tourists and mountaineers are attracted to the nearby higher ranges Wetterstein, Karwendel and to the highest peak of Germany, the Zugspitze.

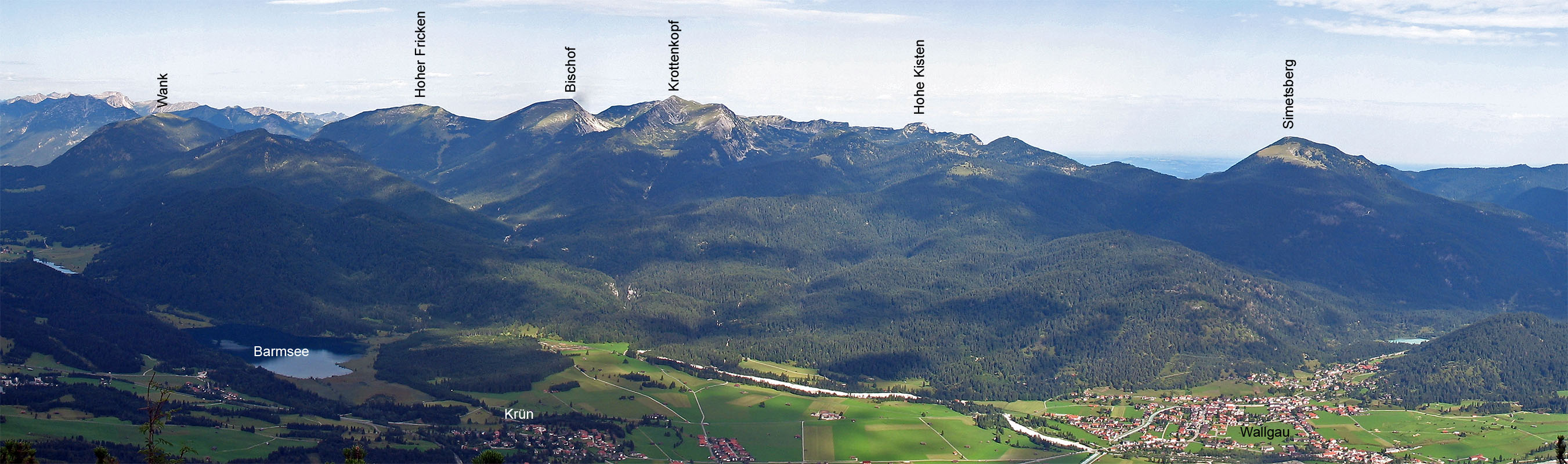
The peaks of the Ester Mountains seen from the southeast

=== Other summits ===
- Risskopf
- Platteneck
- Klaffen
- Wallgauer Eck

== Activities ==
The Ester Mountains offer various trekking and mountaineering possibilities both in summer and winter.

== See also ==
- Kompass (2005) Wettersteingebirge Zugspitzgebiet 1:50,000. Kompass-Wanderkarten, ISBN 3-85491-007-X (map)
