= Seekarkreuz =

Mountain in Bavaria, Germany

Coordinates: 47°39′N 11°39′E

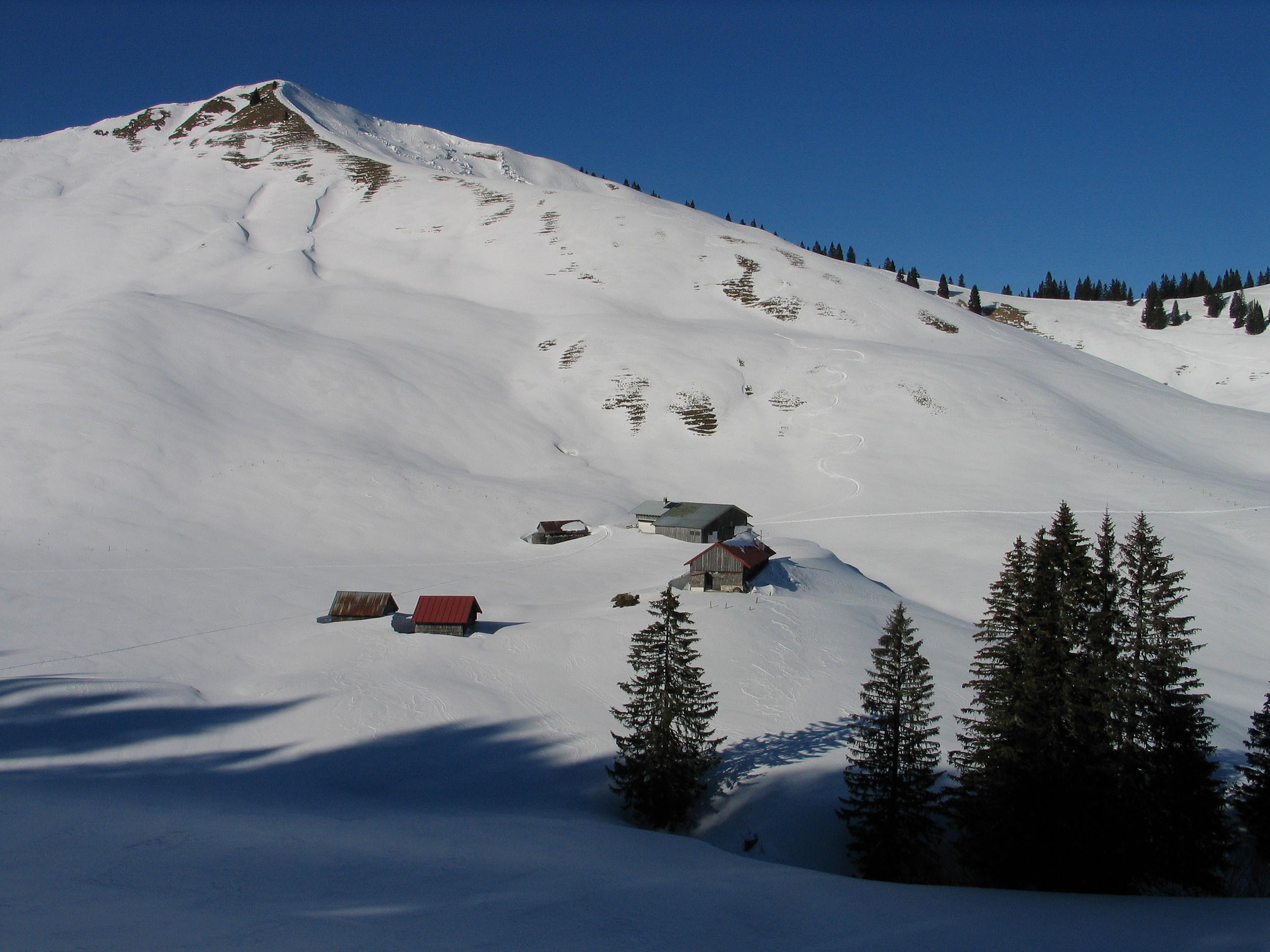
- A partial view of Seekarkreuz, with trees and shadows in the foreground and an illuminated snowy mountain with a few small buildings on it

Highest point
- Elevation: 1,601 m (5,253 ft)

Geography
- Location: Bavaria, Germany

Seekarkreuz is a mountain of Bavaria, Germany.
