= Neureuth (mountain) =

Mountain in Bavaria, Germany

Coordinates: 47°44′N 11°46′E

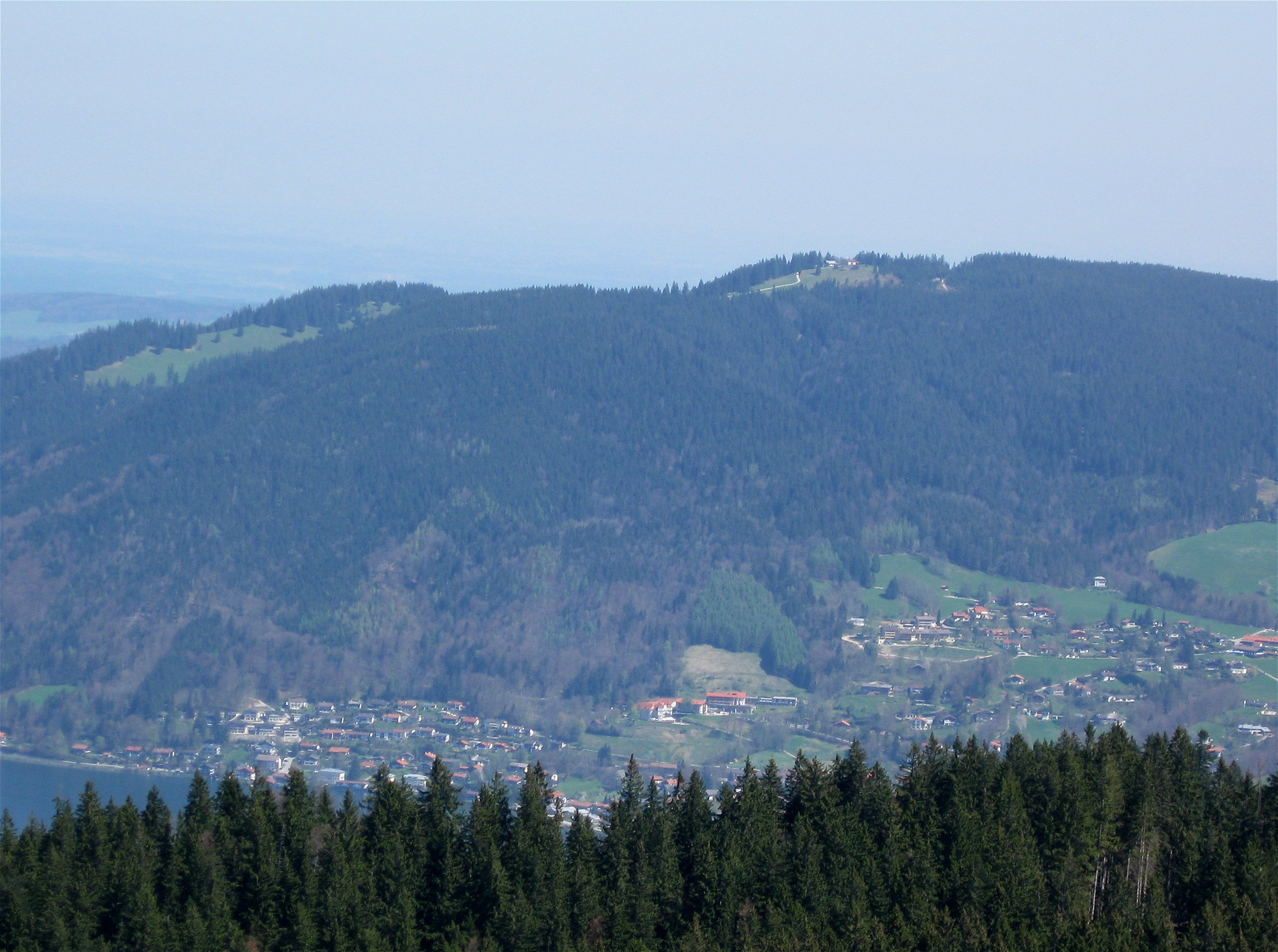
- Neureuth seen from Hirschberg

Highest point
- Elevation: 1,261 m (4,137 ft)

Geography
- Location: Bavaria, Germany
- Parent range: Bavarian Prealps

The Neureuth is a 1,261-metre-high (4,137 ft) mountain in the Bavarian Prealps east of Lake Tegernsee in Bavaria, Germany. It is a popular destination for the citizens of Munich. The summit with the much-visited Neureuth Inn can be reached by an easy hike from the town Tegernsee or from the village Gasse (Gmund am Tegernsee). Even in winter the Neureuth is accessible without special equipment. The Neureuth Inn operates all year round. Alternatively, one can also descend on the 1,335-metre-high (4,380 ft) Gindelalmschneid and Gindelalm to Schliersee.
