= Ruchenköpfe =

Mountain in Bavaria, Germany

Coordinates: 47°39′N 11°57′E

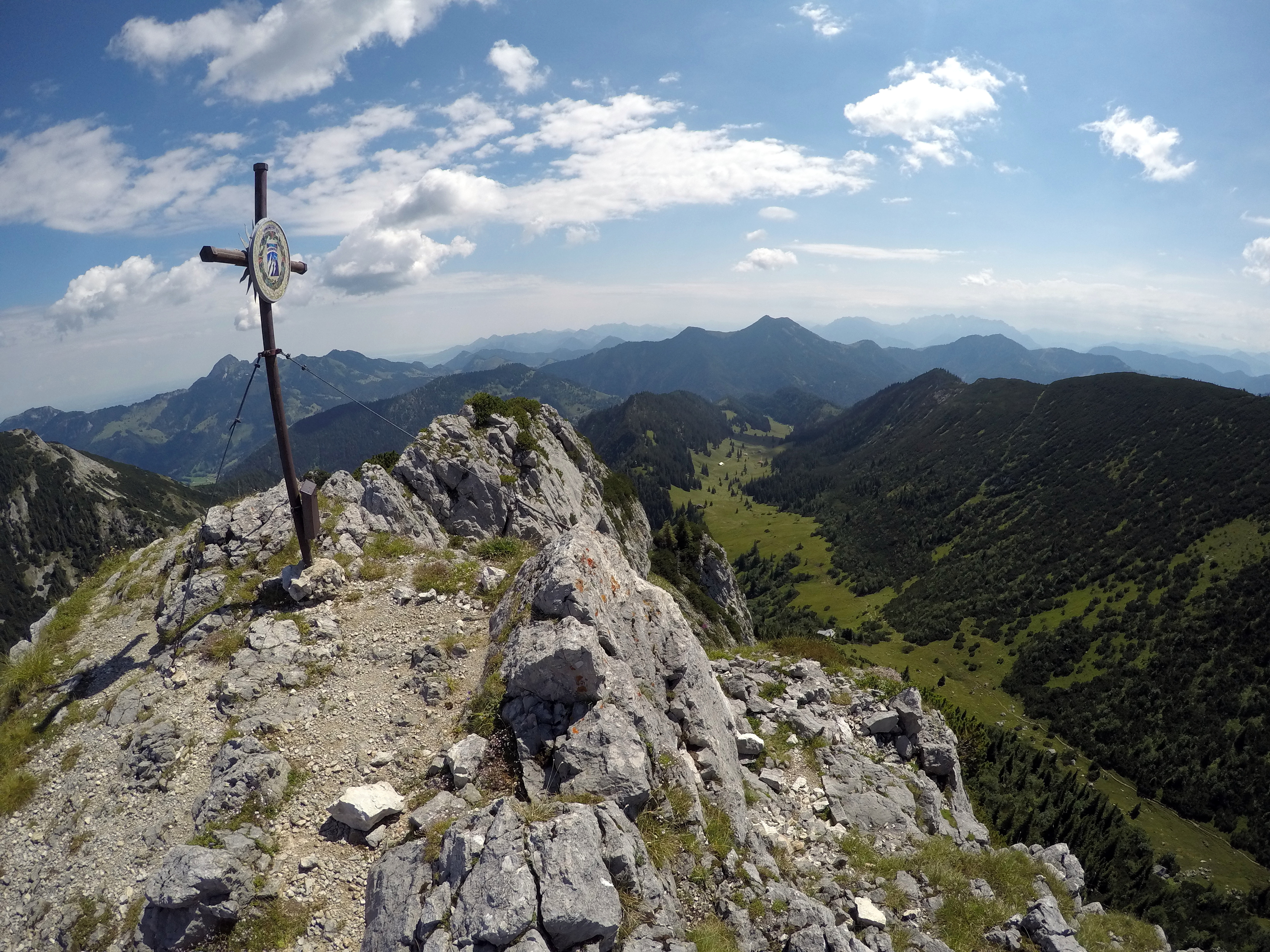
- Ruchenköpfe summit

Highest point
- Elevation: 1,805 m (5,922 ft)

Geography
- Location: Bavaria, Germany

Ruchenköpfe is a mountain of Bavaria, Germany.
