= Plankenstein (mountain) =

Mountain in Bavaria, Germany

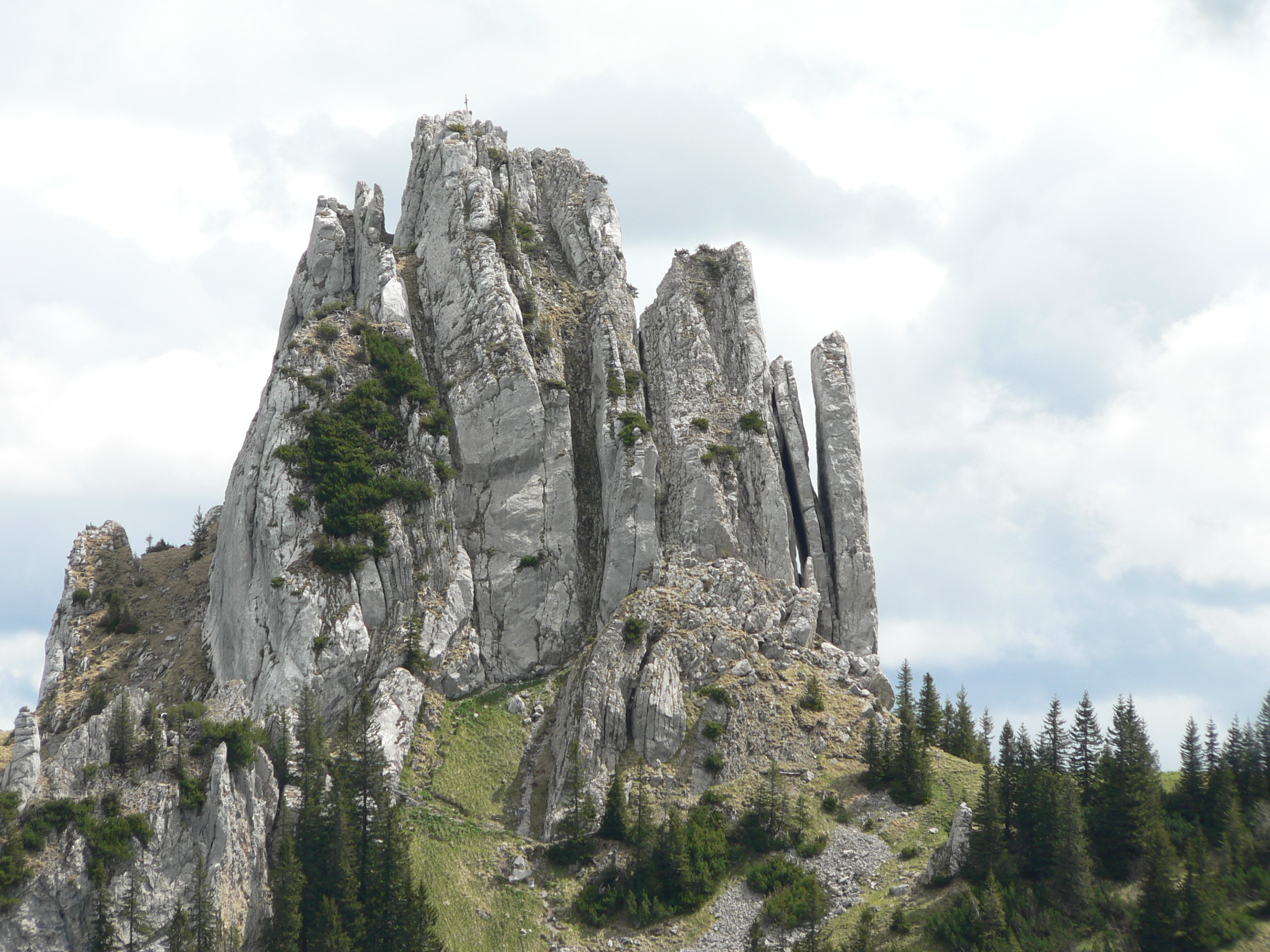

Highest point
- Elevation: 1,768 m (5,801 ft)
- Coordinates: 47°38′N 11°48′E

Geography
- Location within Bavaria
- Location: Bavaria, Germany

Plankenstein is a mountain of Bavaria, Germany.
