= Reintaler See =

Lake in Tyrol, Austria

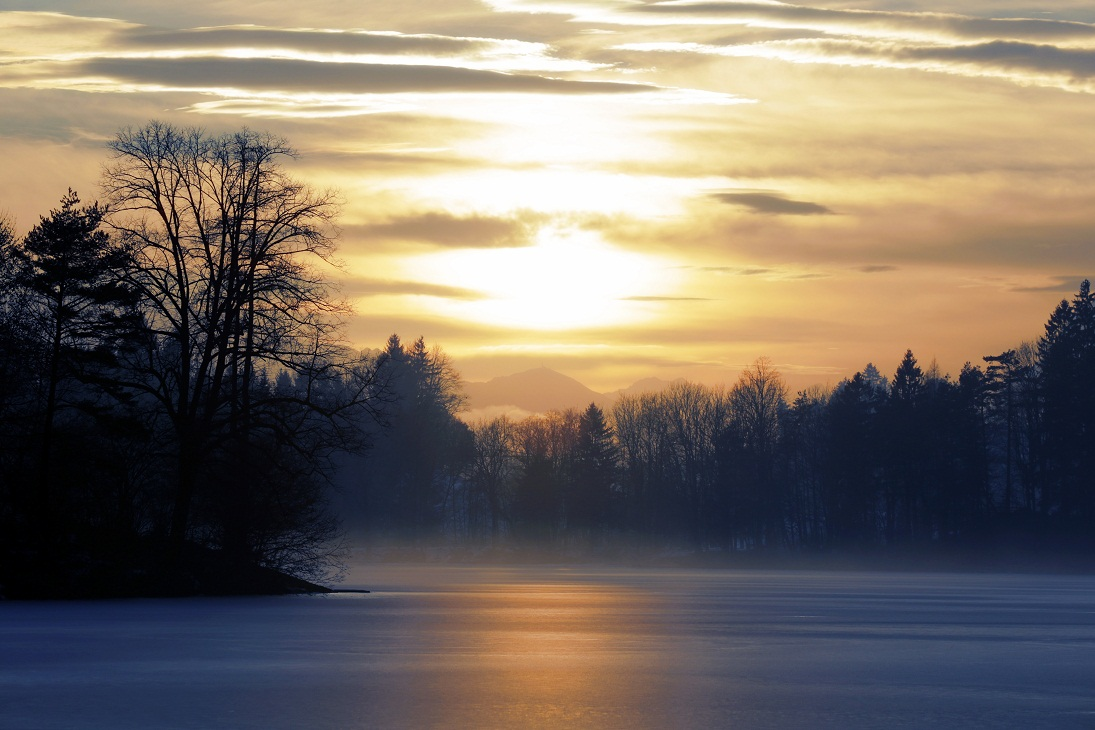

- Location within Tyrol, Austria
- Location: Tyrol
- Coordinates: 47°27′38″N 11°53′44″E

Reintaler See is a lake in Tyrol, Austria, located at the southern foot of the Voldöppberg in the Brandenberg Alps. The lake is divided into three basins, the maximum depth of the eastern basin is 10.30 m, the north basin 9.90 m and the west basin 7.60 m. The lake is fed by groundwater and drained from the western basin to Krummsee.
