= Berglsteiner See =

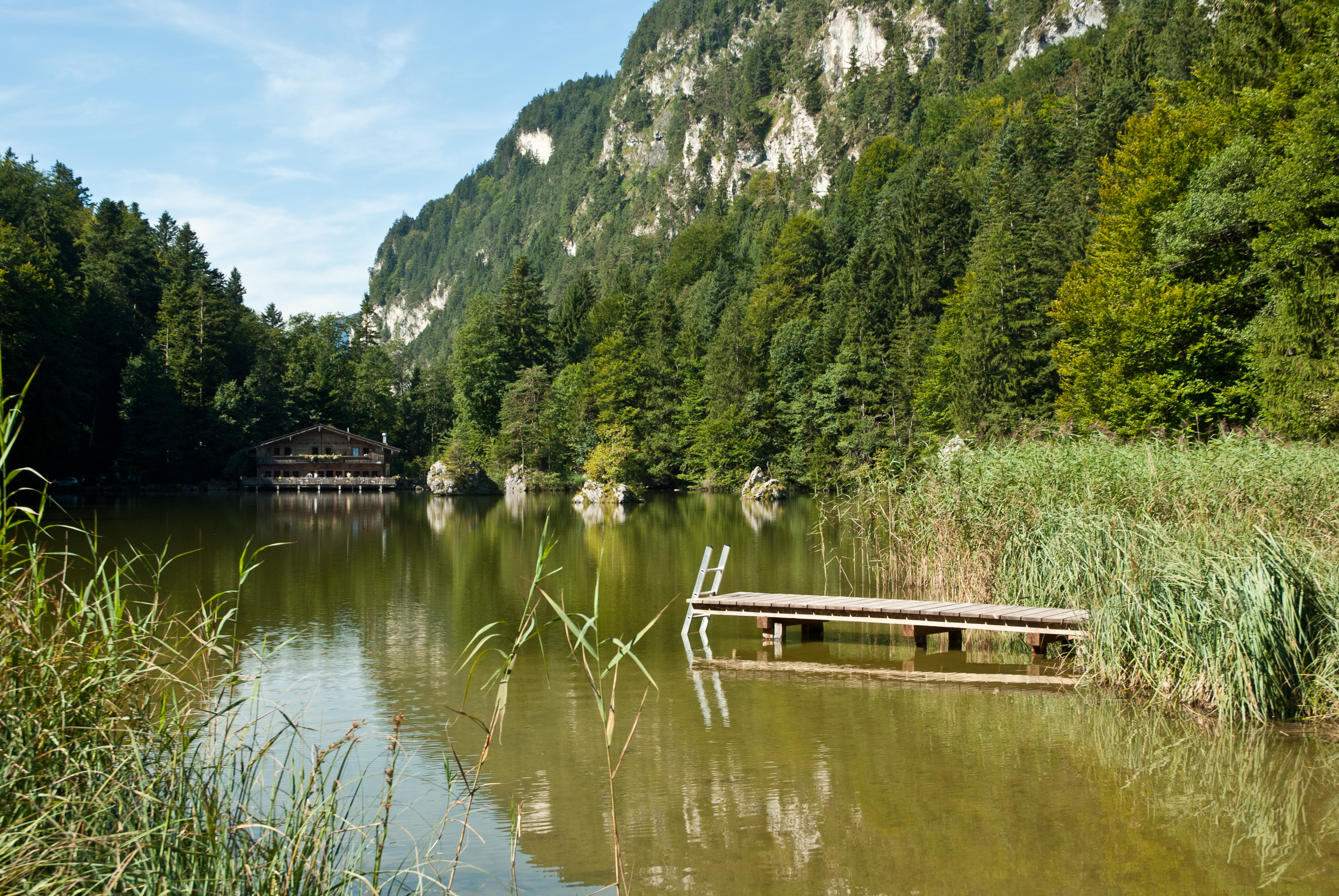
- Berglsteiner See seem from east

- Location within Austria
- Location: Tyrol, Austria
- Coordinates: 47.4726°N 11.9126°E
- Type: lake

Berglsteiner See is a lake of Tyrol, Austria. The lake is located on 713 m height in Breitenbach am Inn in a depression of the south slope of the Voldöppberg (1,509 m), which is part of the Brandenberg Alps.
