= Unnütze =

Mountain ridge in the Austrian Alps

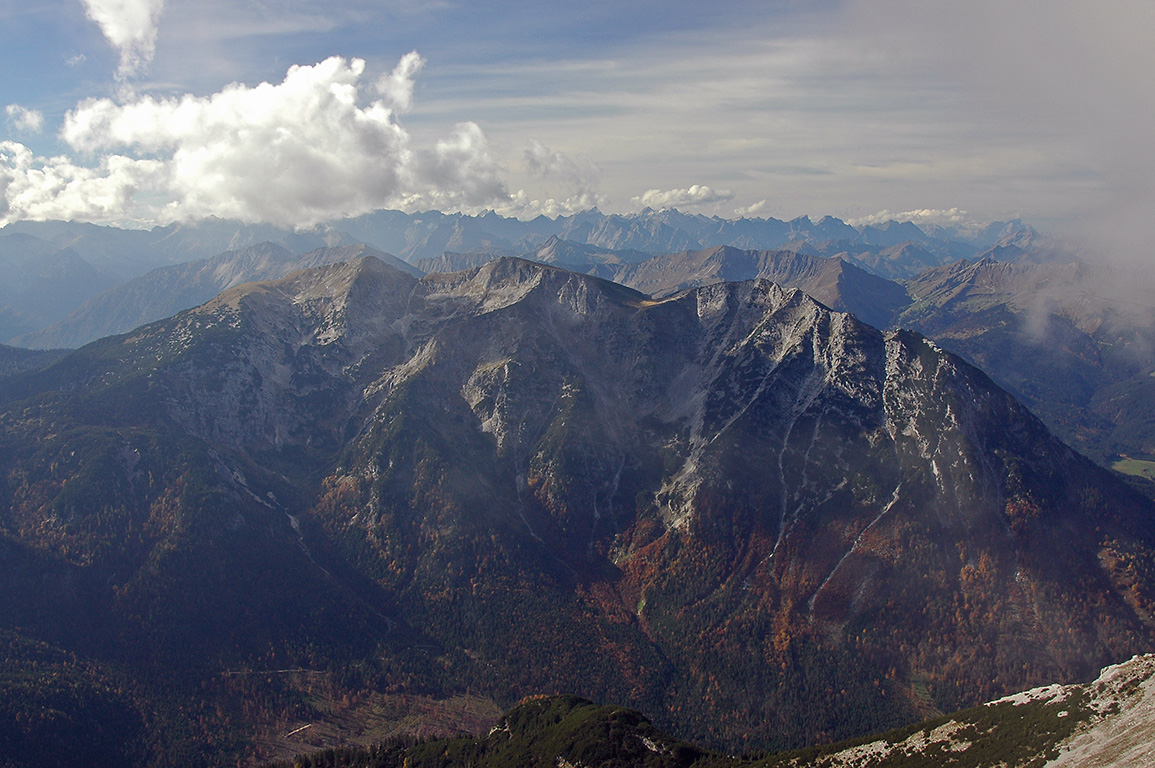
- The eastern side of the Unnütze seen from the Guffert (from left: Vorder-, Hoch- and Hinterunnütz)

Highest point
- Elevation: 2,078 m (AA) (6,818 ft)
- Coordinates: 47°30′55″N 11°44′19″E

Geography
- Location within Austria
- Location: Tyrol, Austria
- Parent range: Brandenberg Alps

Climbing
- Easiest route: Hotel Scholastika, northern end of the Achensee – Köglalm – Vorderunnütz

The Unnütze (also called the Unnutze) is a small mountain ridge northeast of the Achensee lake between Achenkirch and Steinberg am Rofan in the Brandenberg Alps in the Austrian state of Tyrol.

The ridge has three summits and runs in a north to south direction. The summits are the Hinterunnütz (2,007 m), the Hochunnütz (2,075 m) and the Vorderunnütz (2,078 m). In general, however, the Vorderunnütz is called the Unnütz.
