= Blauberge =

Mountain range

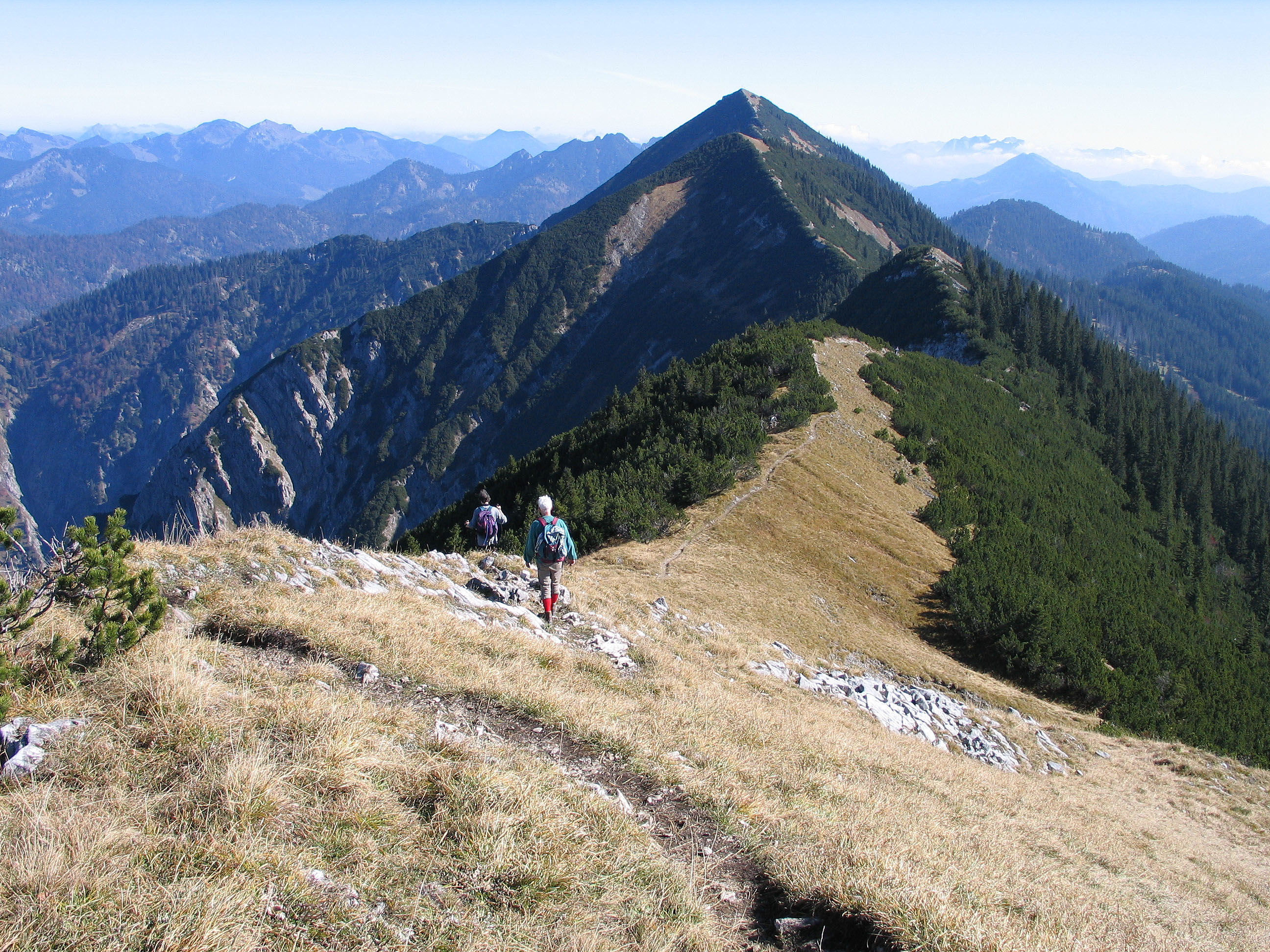
- View looking east along the crest of the Blauberge to the Halserspitz

Highest point
- Peak: Halserspitze
- Elevation: 1,862 m (6,109 ft)

Dimensions
- Length: 4 km (2.5 mi)

Geography
- Location within Alps
- Countries: Austria and Germany
- Range coordinates: 47°35′29″N 11°46′53″E
- Parent range: Tegernsee and Mangfall Mountains; Bavarian Prealps

The Blauberge ("Blue Mountains") or Blauberg are a mountain range in the Bavarian Prealps on the border between the states of Bavaria in Germany and Tyrol in Austria. Its highest summit is the Halserspitze, or Halserspitz at 1,862 m.

== Location and area ==
The Blauberge are part of Upper Bavaria's Mangfall Mountains or more precisely the Tegernsee Mountains and are located about 11 kilometres south of the Tegernsee lake. The crest of the Blauberge, which runs for about 4 kilometres in a west–east direction, forms the border between Austria to the south and Germany to the north. To the south the Brandenberg Alps extend as far as the valley of the River Inn. To the north lies the Wolfsschlucht ("Wolf's Gorge") and about four kilometres away the former spa of Wildbad Kreuth. To the west the neighbouring mountain is the 1,613 m high Schildenstein, which is also sometimes counted as one of the Blauberge. The massif consists of six peaks that, from west to east, are the:

- Predigtstuhl (1,562 m, 47°35′20″N 11°44′12″E)
- Wichtlplatte (1,765 m, 47°35′16″N 11°44′43″E)
- Blaubergschneid (1,787 m, 47°35′20″N 11°45′03″E)
- Blaubergkopf (1,787 m, 47°35′24″N 11°46′03″E)
- Karspitz (1,800 m, 47°35′26″N 11°46′36″E)
- Halserspitz (1,862 m, 47°35′29″N 11°46′53″E)

At 1,862 m the Halserspitz is not only the highest peak in the Blauberge, but also in the entire Tegernsee Mountains. The southern flank of the Blauberge is covered by mountain pine right up to the crest; the considerably steeper northern slopes have a more rocky character.

== Bases and trails ==
An important base is the Guffert Hut (1,475 m) just southeast of the Halserspitze (1,475 m). The hut belongs to the German Alpine Club branch at Kaufering and is managed during the summer offering overnight stops. Not far away is the self-service hut, Bayerische Wildalm, which belongs to the Munich branch of the German Alpine Club. There is a similar hut, the Blaubergalm (1,540 m), further west immediately below the Predigtstuhl.

A signed hiking trail runs along the crest of the Blauberge that enables the entire massif to be traversed. The start point for this popular, but long circular route is usually Wildbad Kreuth. The path climbs from there via Siebenhüttenalm and through the Wolfsschlucht to the saddle between Schildenstein and Predigtstuhl and is secured by cables in places. Other trails lead from the Guffert Hut or from Achenwald. The eastern end of the Blauberge may be reached from the Guffert Hut or from Wildbad Kreuth (via the Wenigberg Hut or the Bayrbachalm). The whole circuit is estimated to take around eight hours.

== Sources and Map ==
- Zimmermann, Wolfgang und Gerlinde (1980). Alpenvereinsführer Bayerische Voralpen-Ost, Bergverlag Rother, Munich, ISBN 3-7633-1103-3
- Hohenester, Georg and Winter, Stefan (2009). Bayerns Berge, Bergverlag Rother, Munich, ISBN 978-3-7633-3041-6
- Alpenvereinskarte 1:25.000, Blatt BY 13, Mangfallgebirge West, Tegernsee, Hirschberg
