= Tegernsee Mountains =

Mountain range in Germany

Coordinates: 47.637°N 11.7161°E

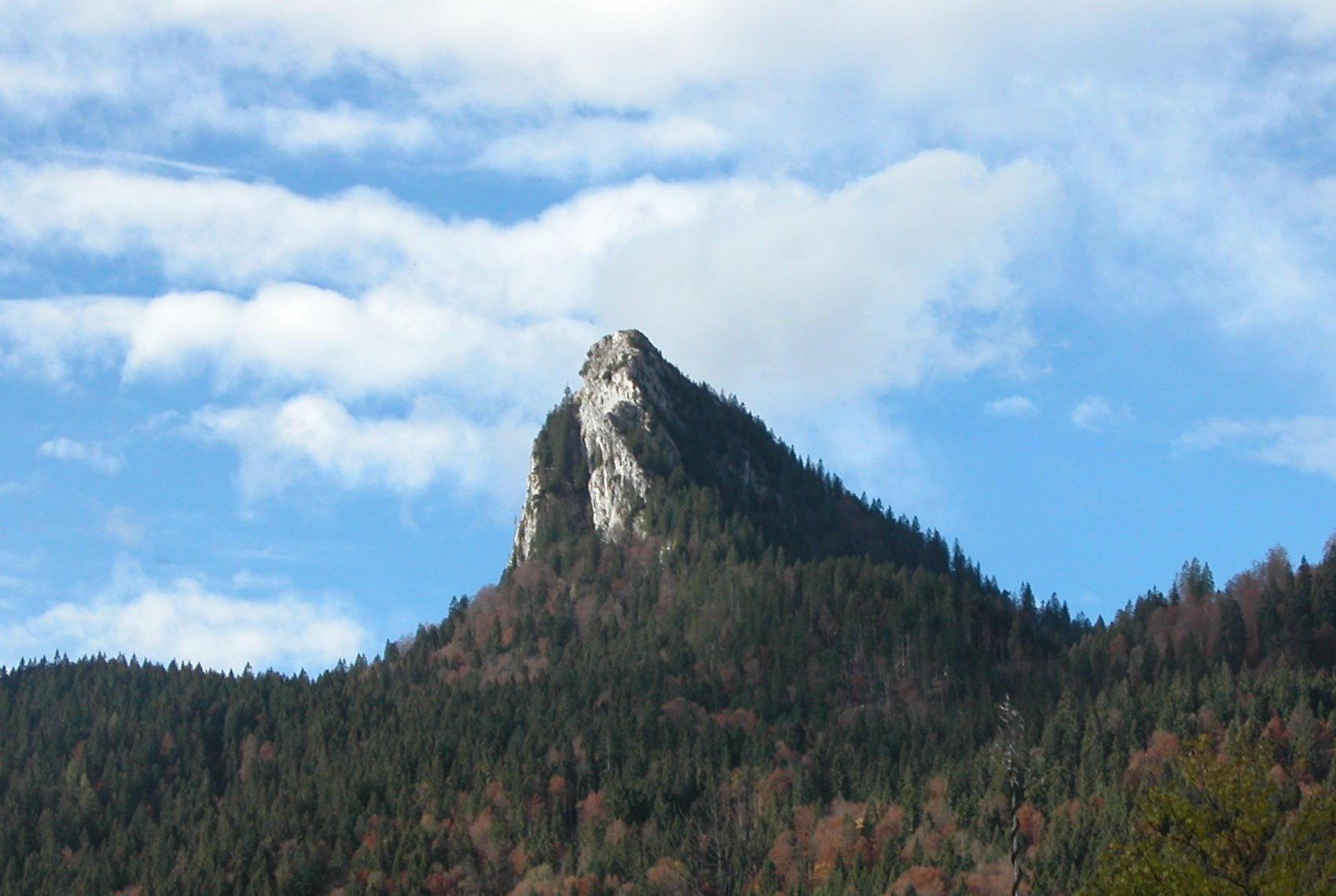
The Leonhardstein west of Kreuth

The Tegernsee Mountains (German: Tegernseer Berge) form a mountain region between the River Isar in the west and the lake of Tegernsee as well as the Rottach, Weißen Valepp and Grundache south of the Tegernsee, in the east, and so form a part of the Bavarian Prealps. The Tegernsee Mountains are also the westernmost part of the Mangfall Mountains (Mangfallgebirge).

Well-known walking destinations are the peaks of a range of medium-high mountains with heights of under 2,000 m. Climbing areas are the massifs of Roßstein, Buchstein, and Plankenstein.

== Notable peaks ==
- Halserspitz (1,862 m)
- Risserkogel (1,826 m)
- Schinder (1,808 m)
- Plankenstein (1,768 m)
- Buchstein (1,701 m)
- Roßstein (1,698 m)
- Hirschberg (1,670 m)
- Schönberg (1,620 m)
- Leonhardstein (1,452 m)
- Fockenstein (1,564 m)
