= Schildenstein =

Coordinates: 47°36′N 11°44′E

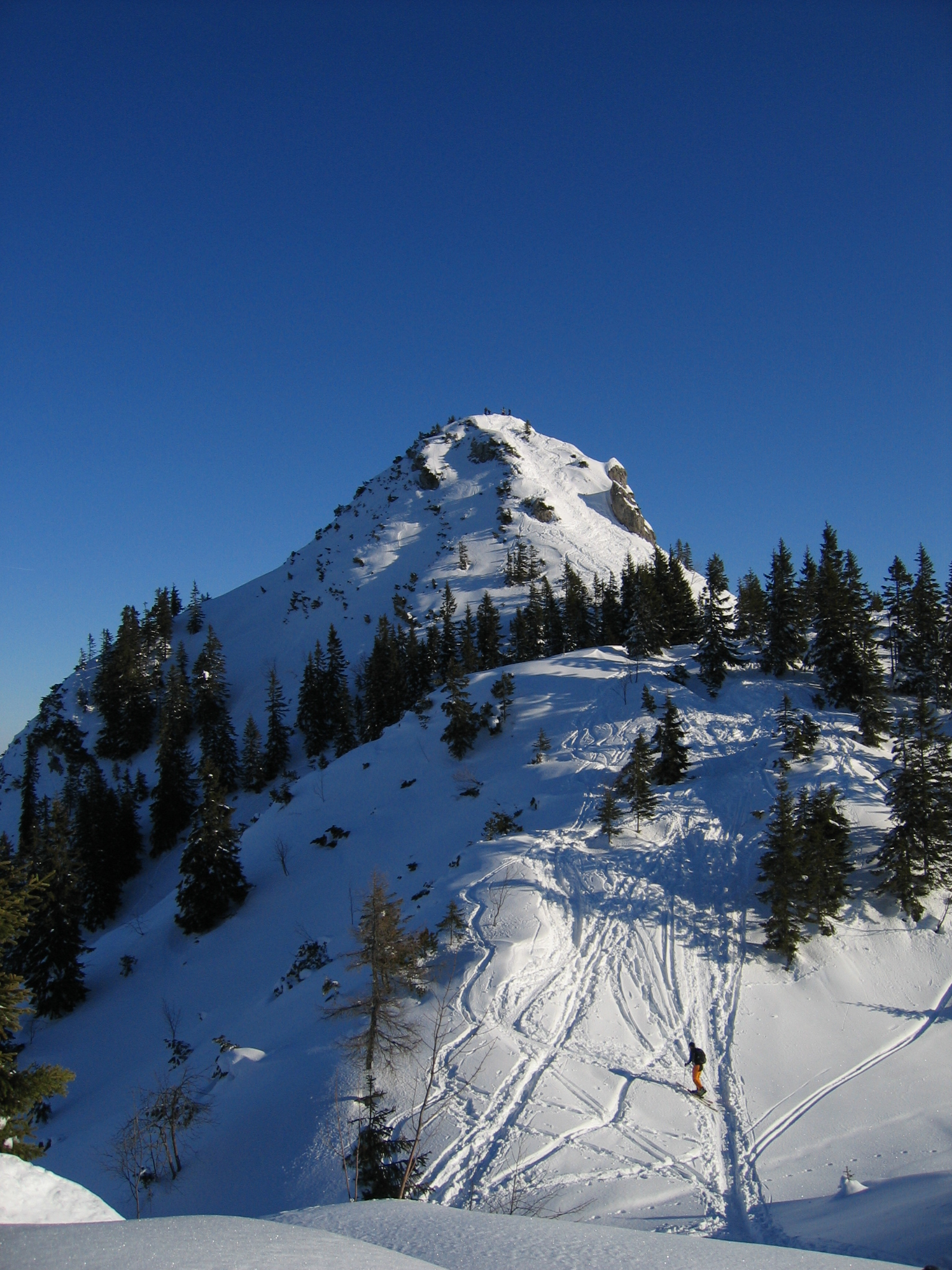
- Schildenstein in Winter

Highest point
- Elevation: 1,613 m (5,292 ft)

Geography
- Location: Bavaria, Germany
- Parent range: Bavarian Prealps (Mangfall Mountains)

Climbing
- Easiest route: Wildbad Kreuth – Geißalm - Königsalm - Schildenstein

The Schildenstein is a 1613 m high mountain in the Mangfall Mountains in Bavaria. The peak can be reached after an easy hike from Kreuth over the Geißalm and Königsalm. The route via the Wolfsschlucht, on the other hand, is made secure by wire cables. The Blauberge are connected to the East side of the Schildenstein.

The Kavalierhaus on the Königsalm was built in 1818 by the King of Bavaria, Maximilian I. The king was said to have frequented the Alpine pasture. The wooden structure nearby dates from 1723, and is the largest historic alpine hut in the Miesbach district.

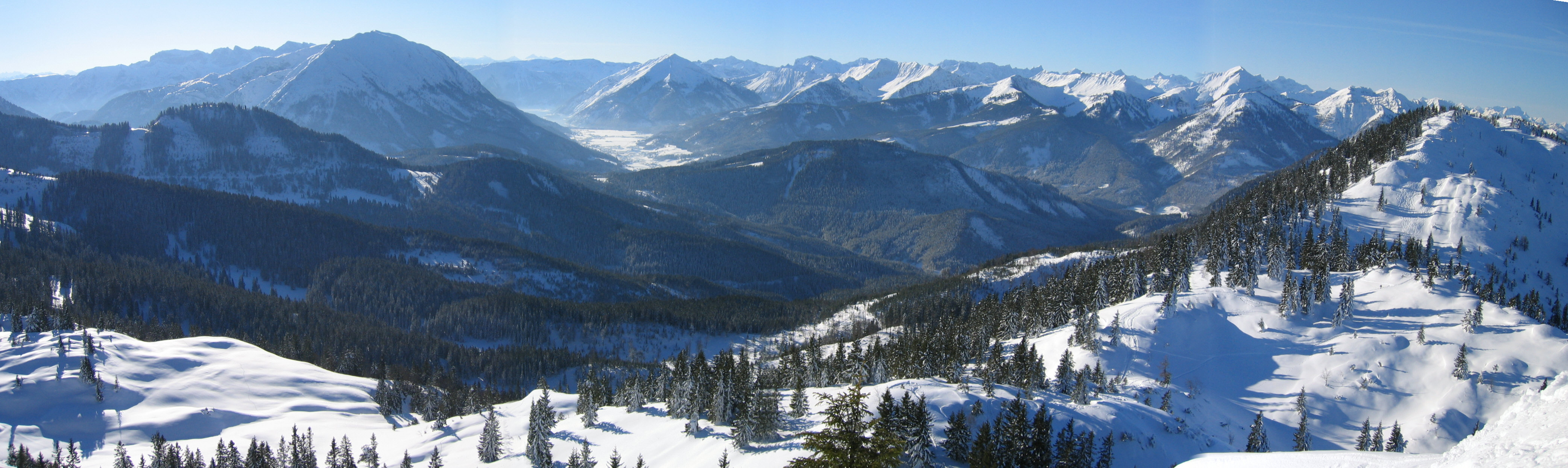
Schildenstein peak panorama in Winter. The Guffert is on the left of the picture.

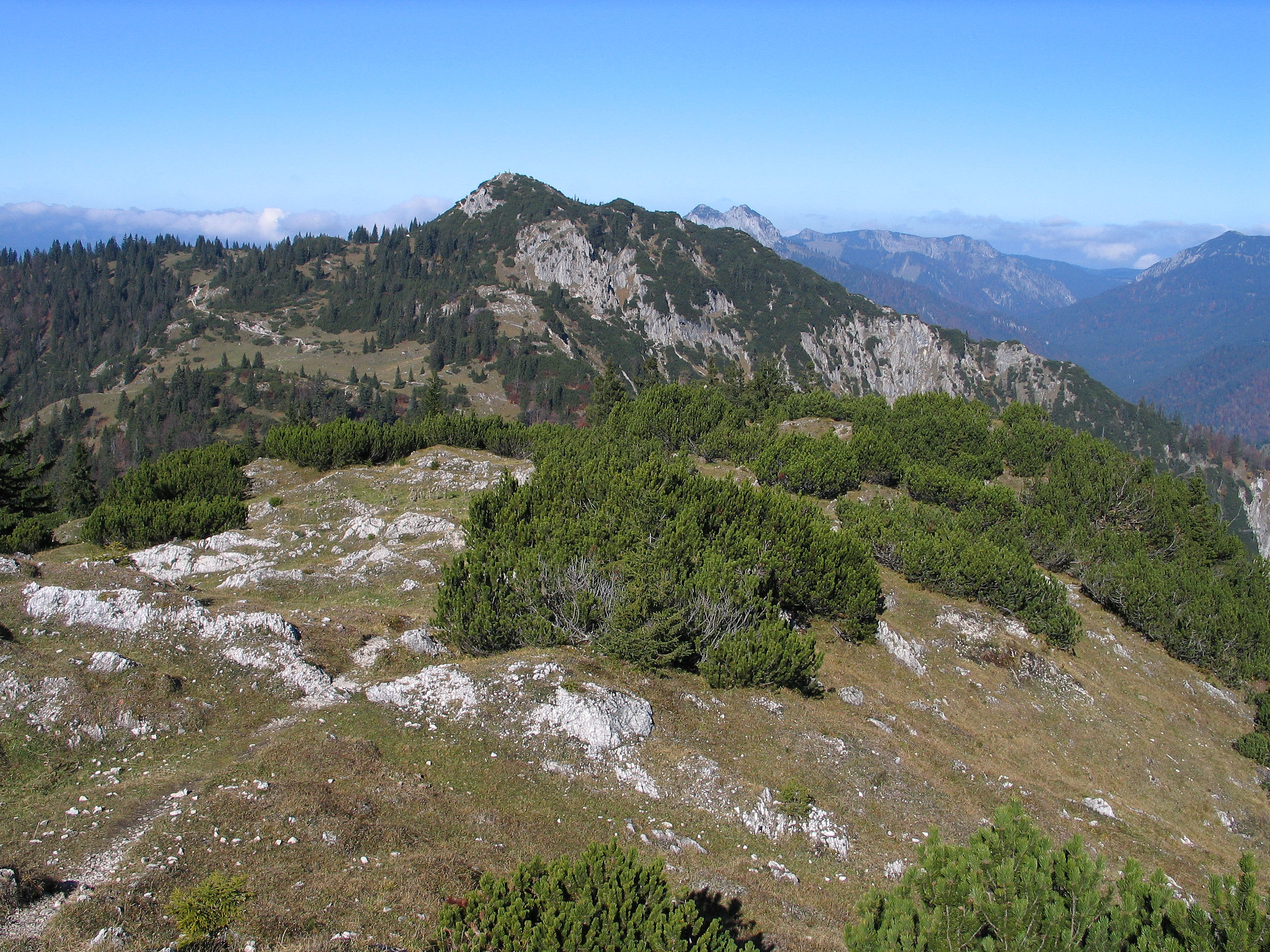
Schildenstein from the East

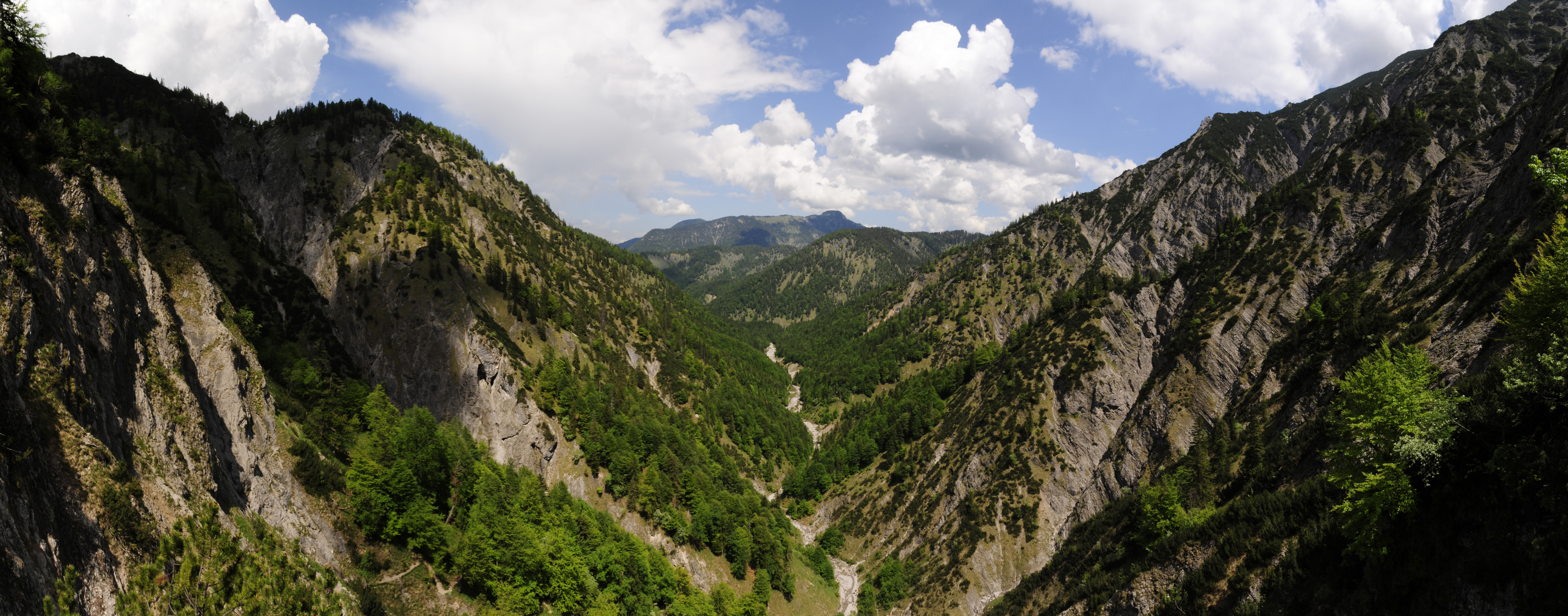
View into the Wolfsschlucht
