= Guffert =

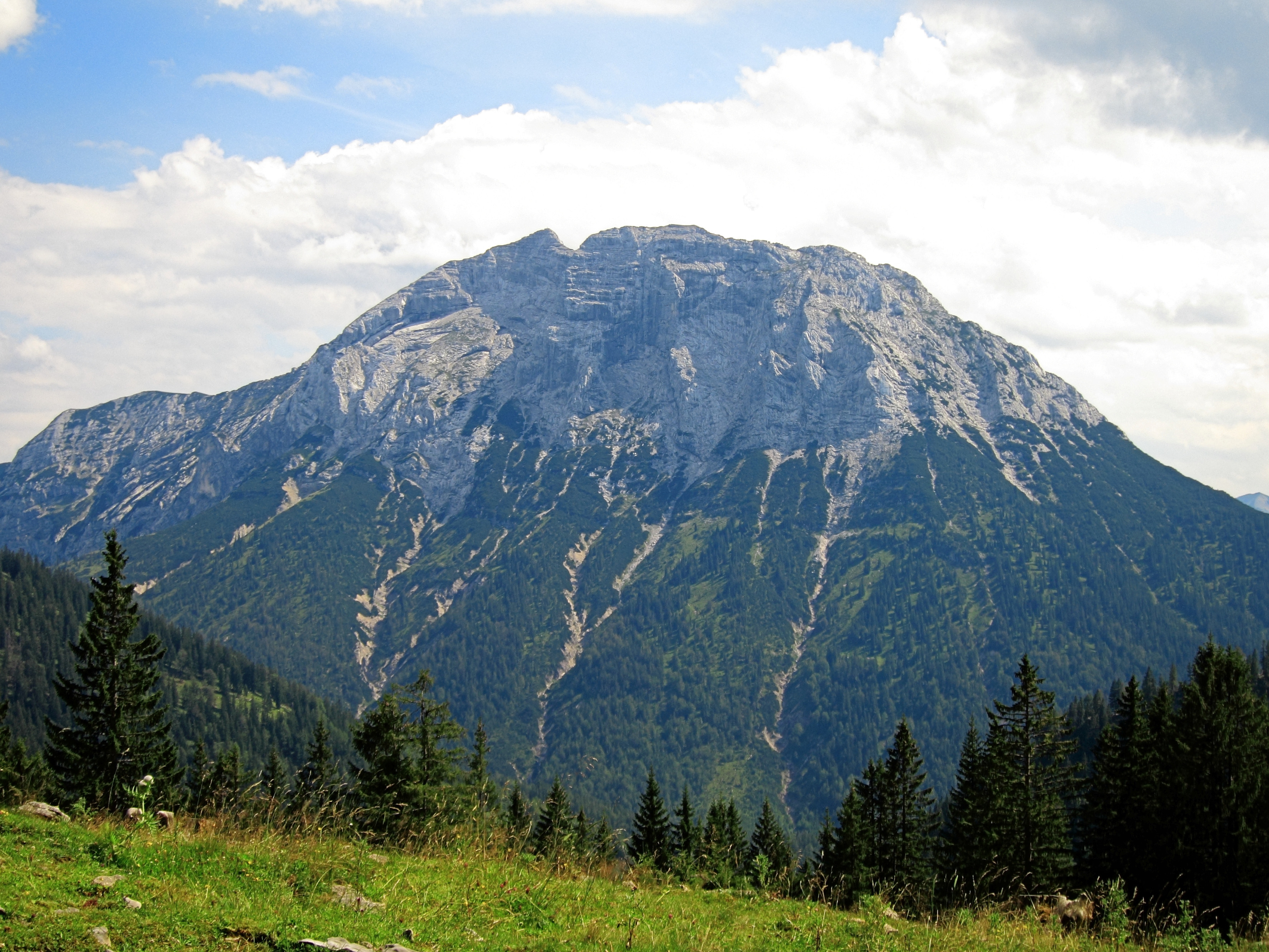
- The Guffert from the north

Highest point
- Elevation: 2,195 m (7,201 ft)
- Prominence: 1,143 m (3,750 ft)
- Coordinates: 47°32′49″N 11°47′21″E

Geography
- Location within Austria
- Location: Tyrol, Austria
- Parent range: Brandenberg Alps

Geology
- Rock age: Triassic
- Mountain type(s): Wetterstein limestone, Main dolomite

The Guffert is a 2,195 metres (7,201 ft) high, isolated, prominent limestone alpenstock in the Brandenberg Alps (Rofan) that, together with the Guffertstein, forms a twin peak. It lies north of Steinberg am Rofan. Because it projects above the Mangfall Mountains to the north by about 300 metres, the striking double peak is easily recognised from the Alpine Foreland, the Tegernsee and the Bavarian Prealps.

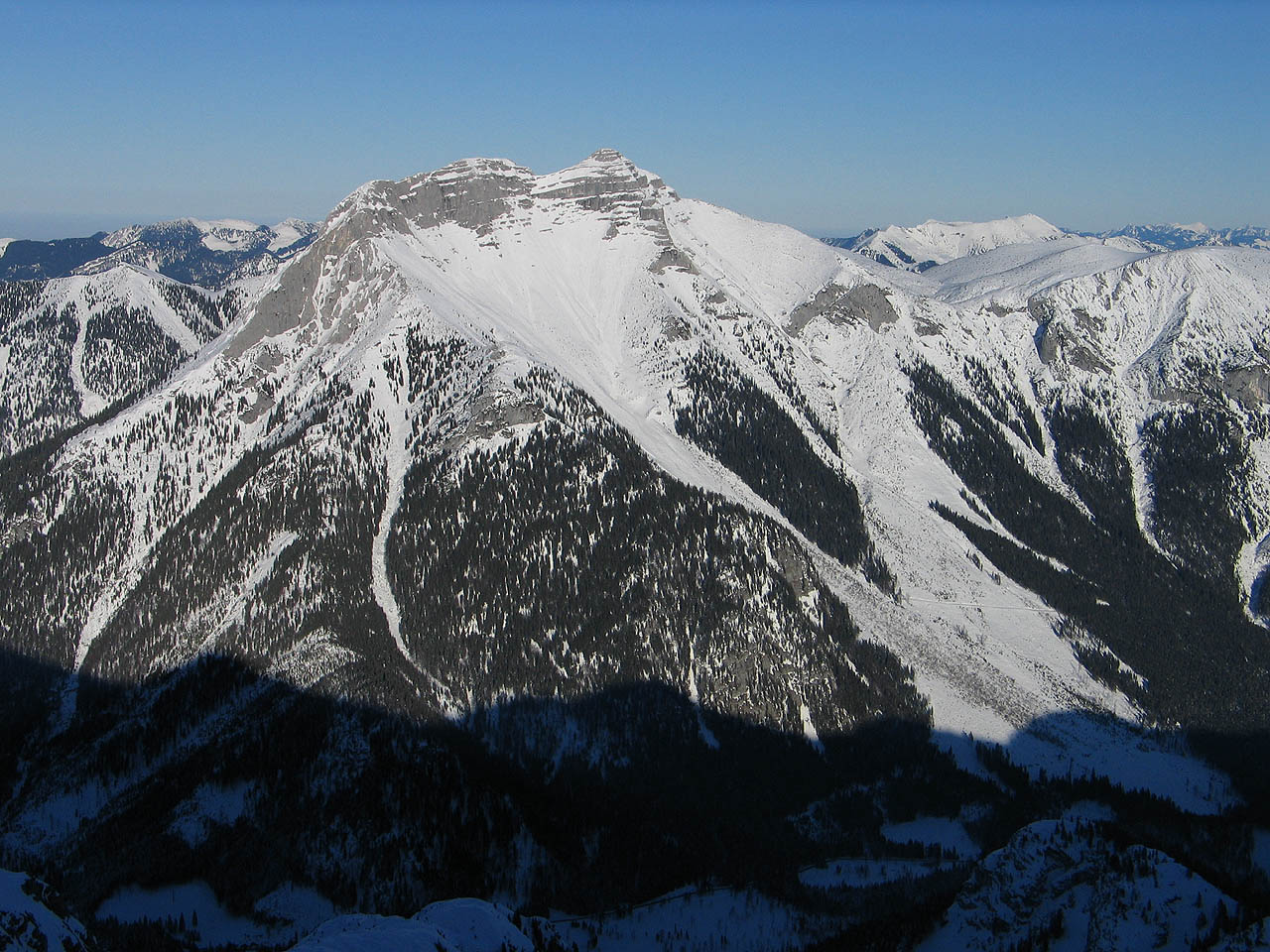
The Guffert from the southwest (from the Vorderunnütz)

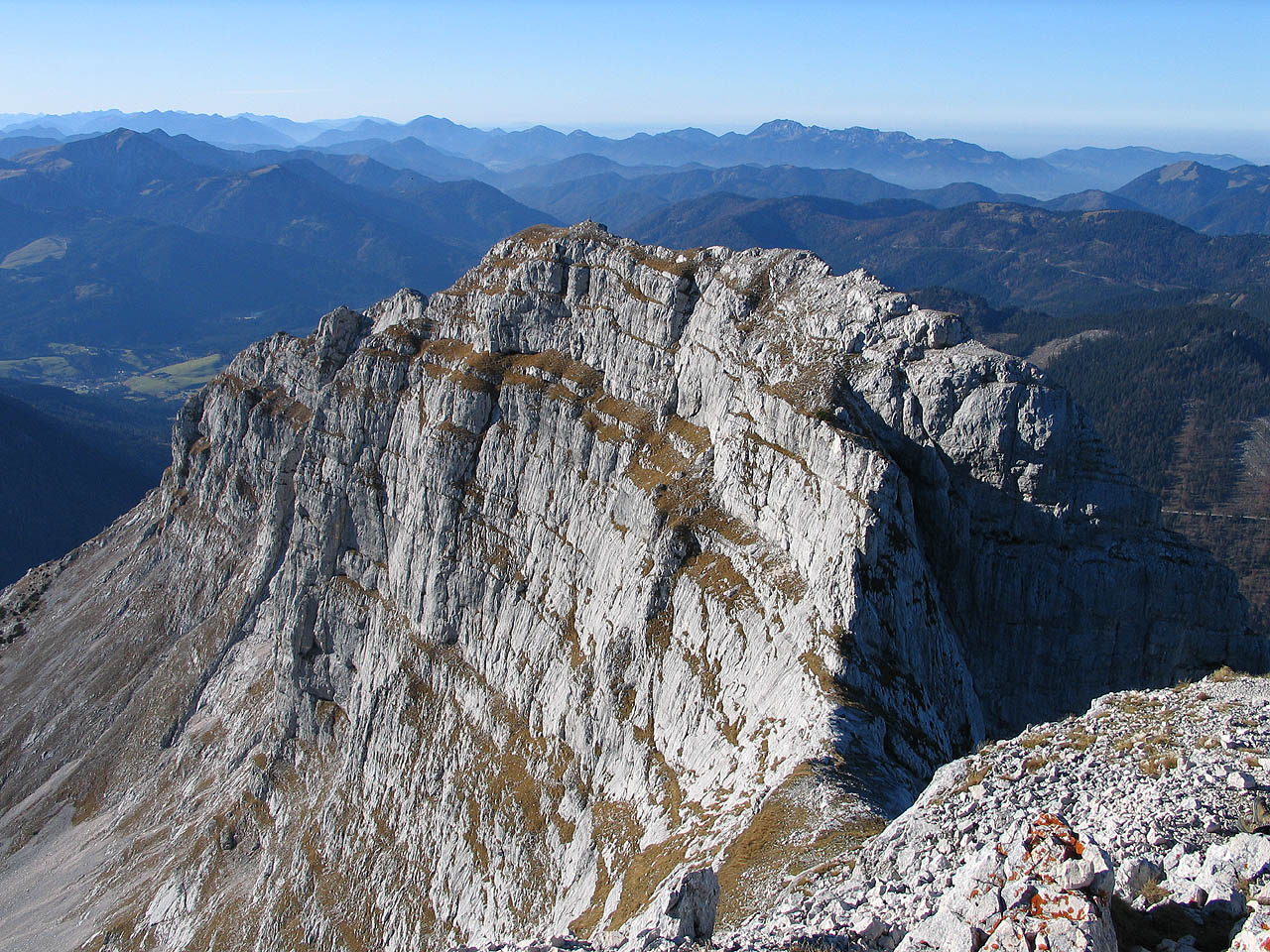
The western summit seen from the main summit

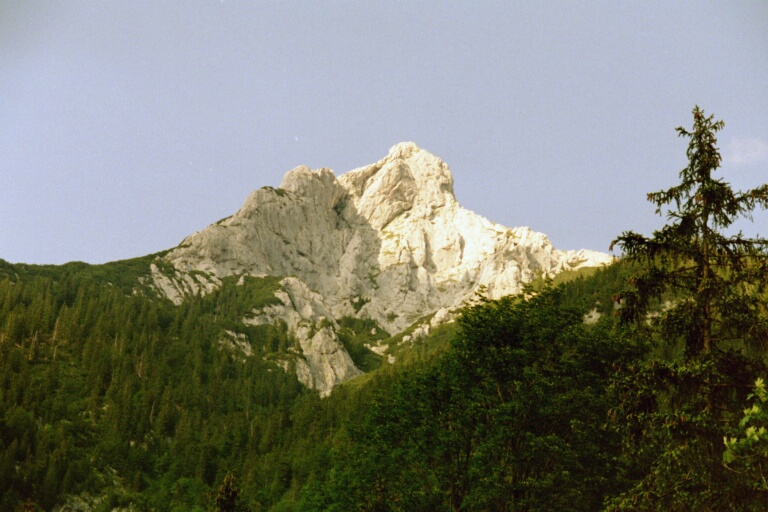
The "unfriendly" west side of the Guffert

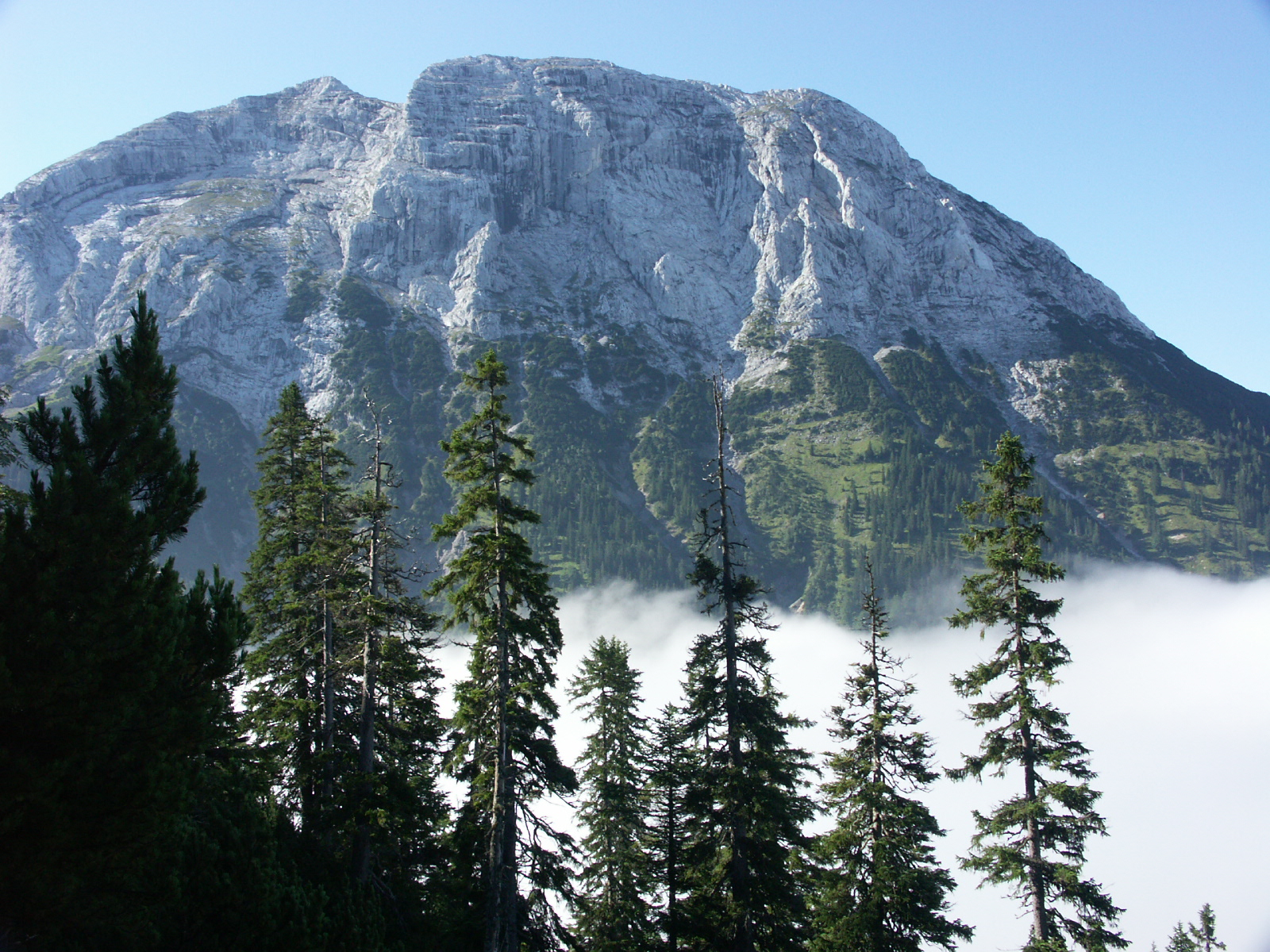
Guffert - north side

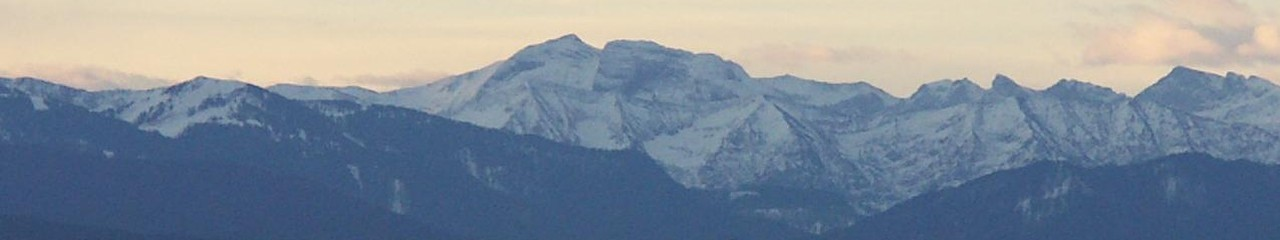
The Guffert seen from Munich

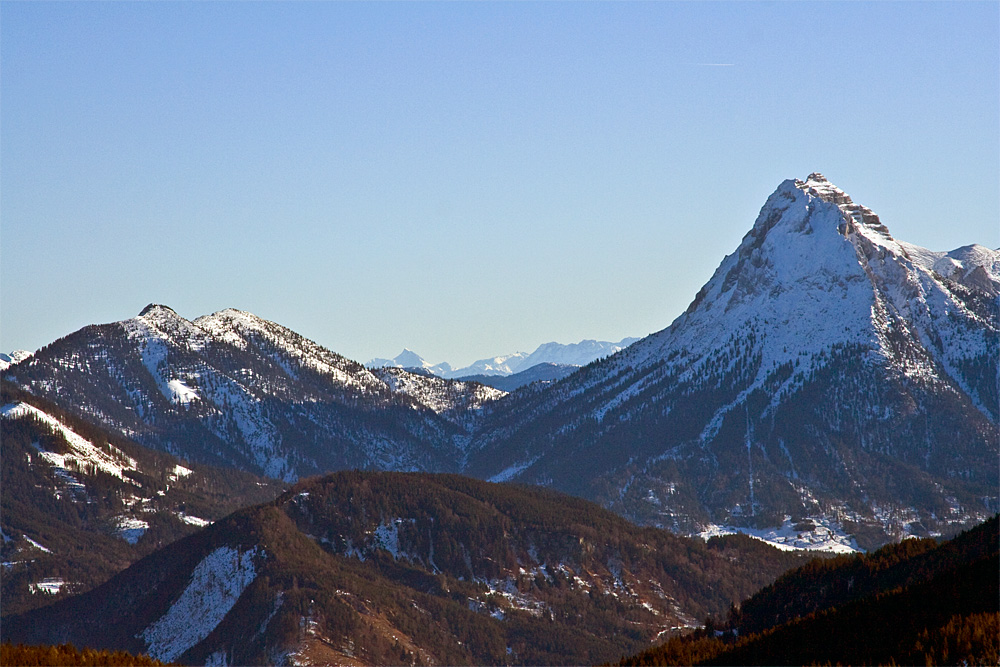
Northwest side of the Guffert

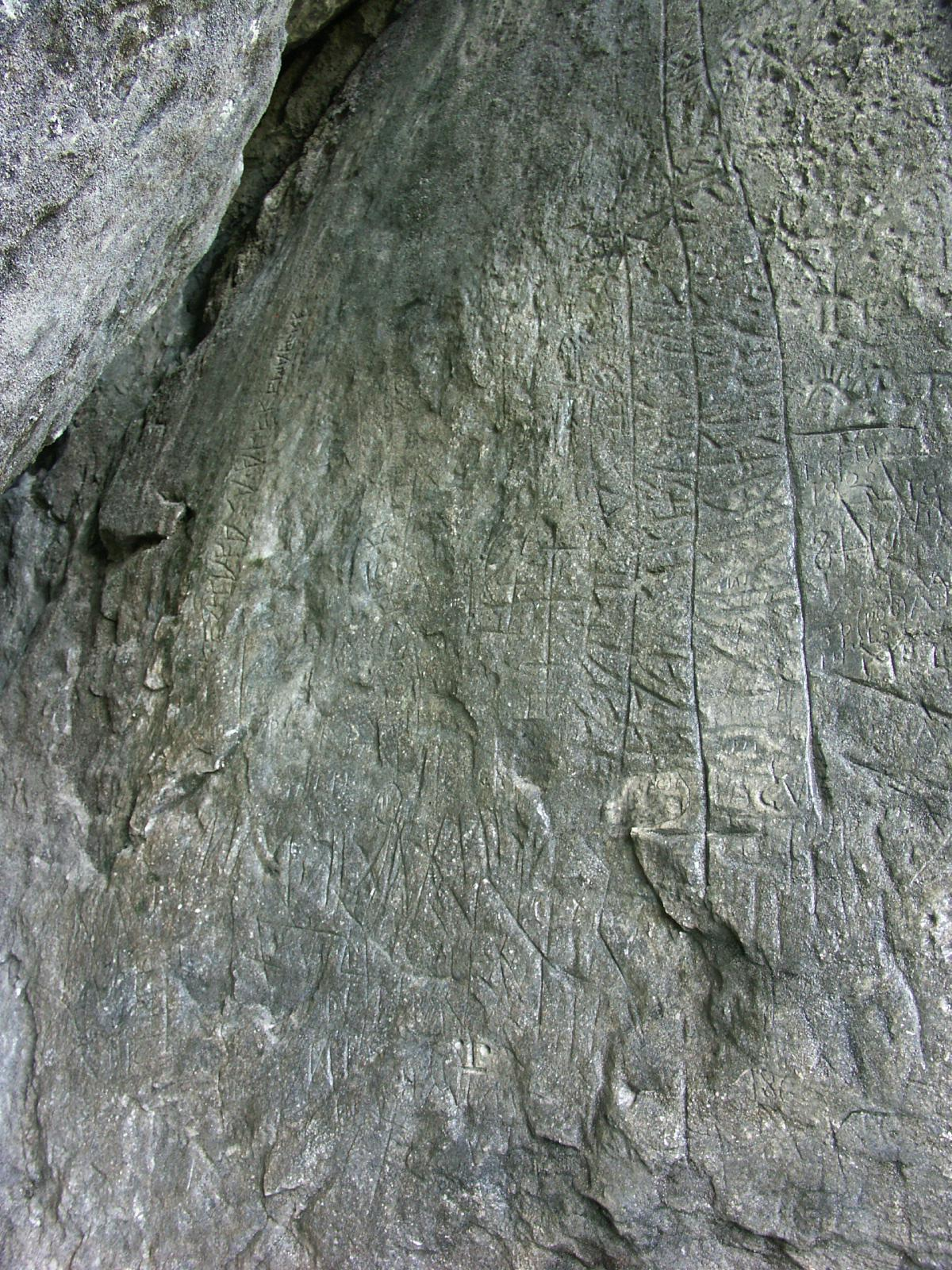
Etruscan inscription in the rock cleft

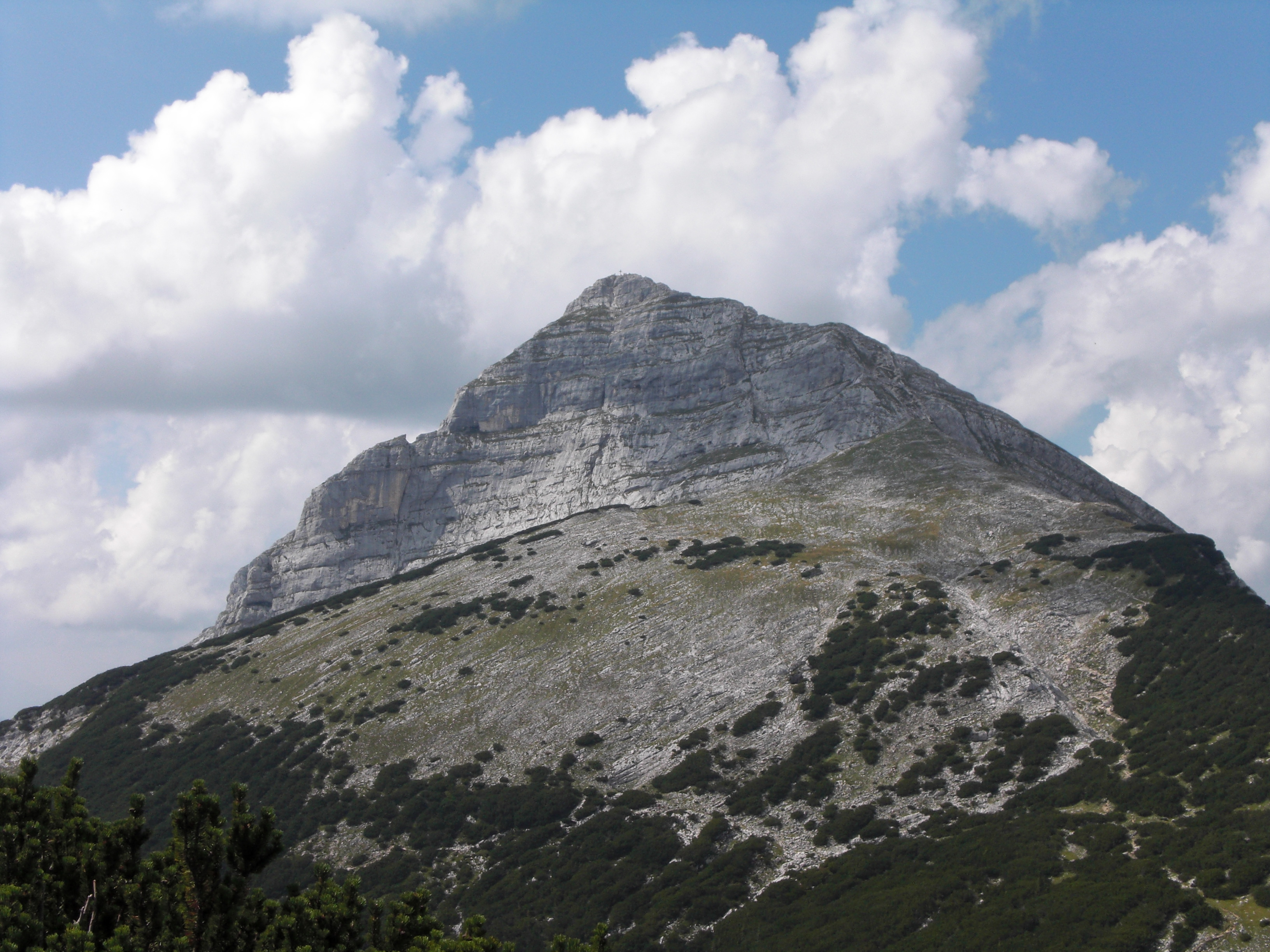
East side of the Guffert
