= Roßstein and Buchstein =

Mountain in the Tegernsee Mountains, Bavaria, Germany

Roß- und Buchstein
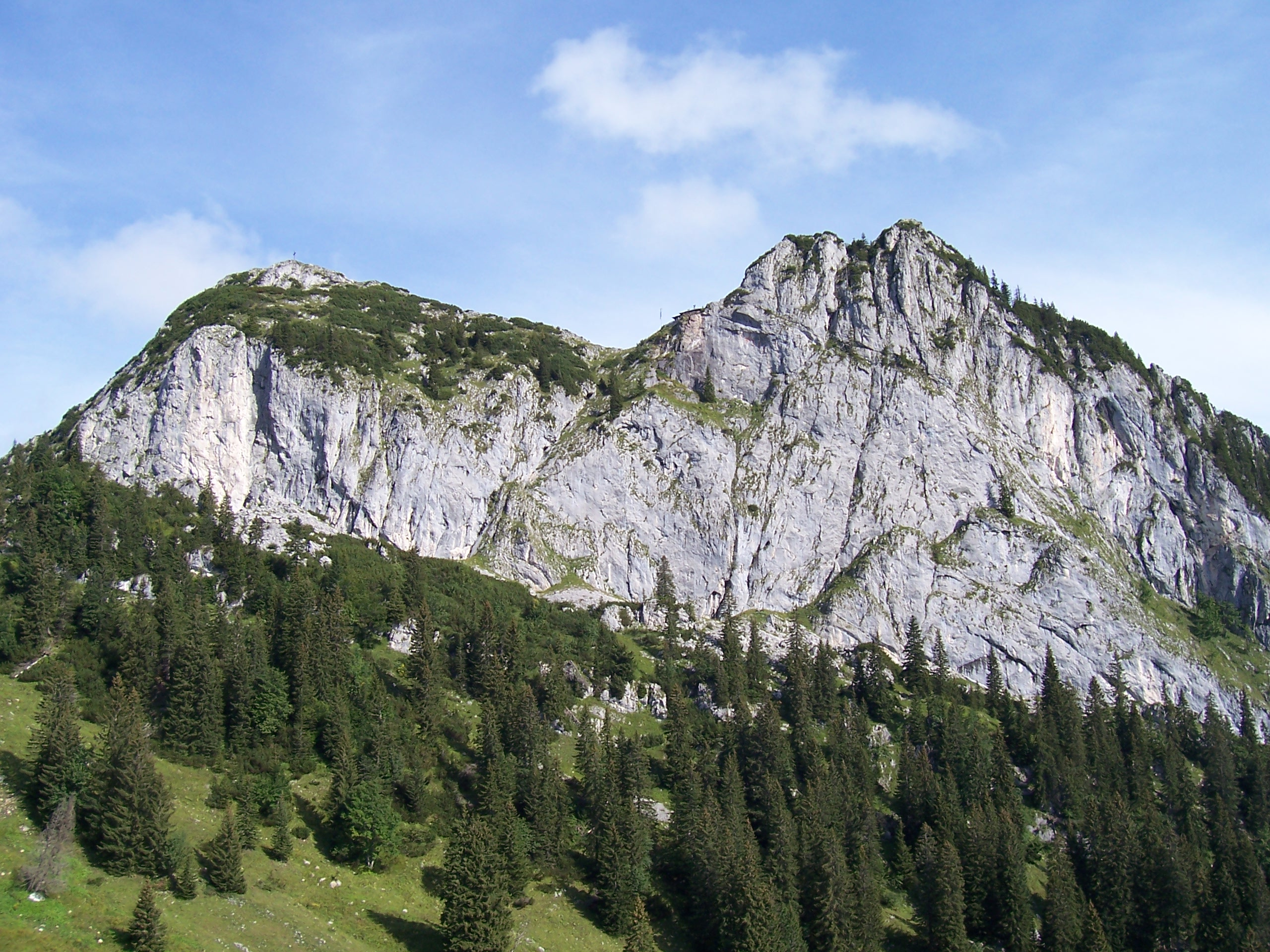
- Roßstein (1,698 m) and Buchstein (1,701 m)

Highest point
- Elevation: 1,701 m (5,581 ft)
- Coordinates: 47°38′05″N 11°40′55″E

Geography
- Location within Bavaria
- Location: Bavaria, Germany

The Roß- und Buchstein (1,701 m) are two mountain peaks within the Tegernsee Mountains range, in the Bavarian Prealps, Bavaria, Germany. The Tegernsee cabin (German: Tegernseer Hütte) is lodged between the Roßstein and the Buchstein.

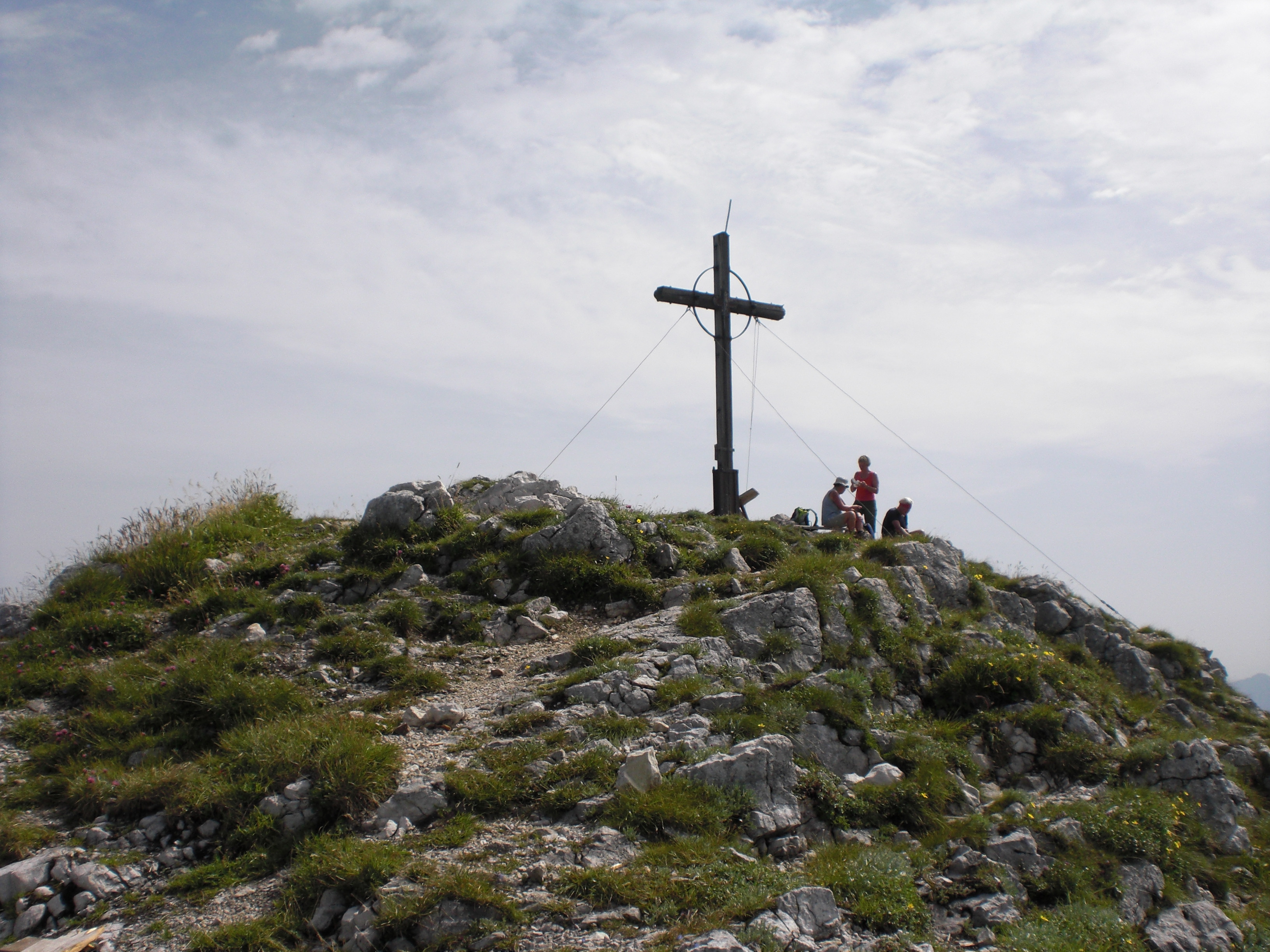
Cross on the Roßstein.

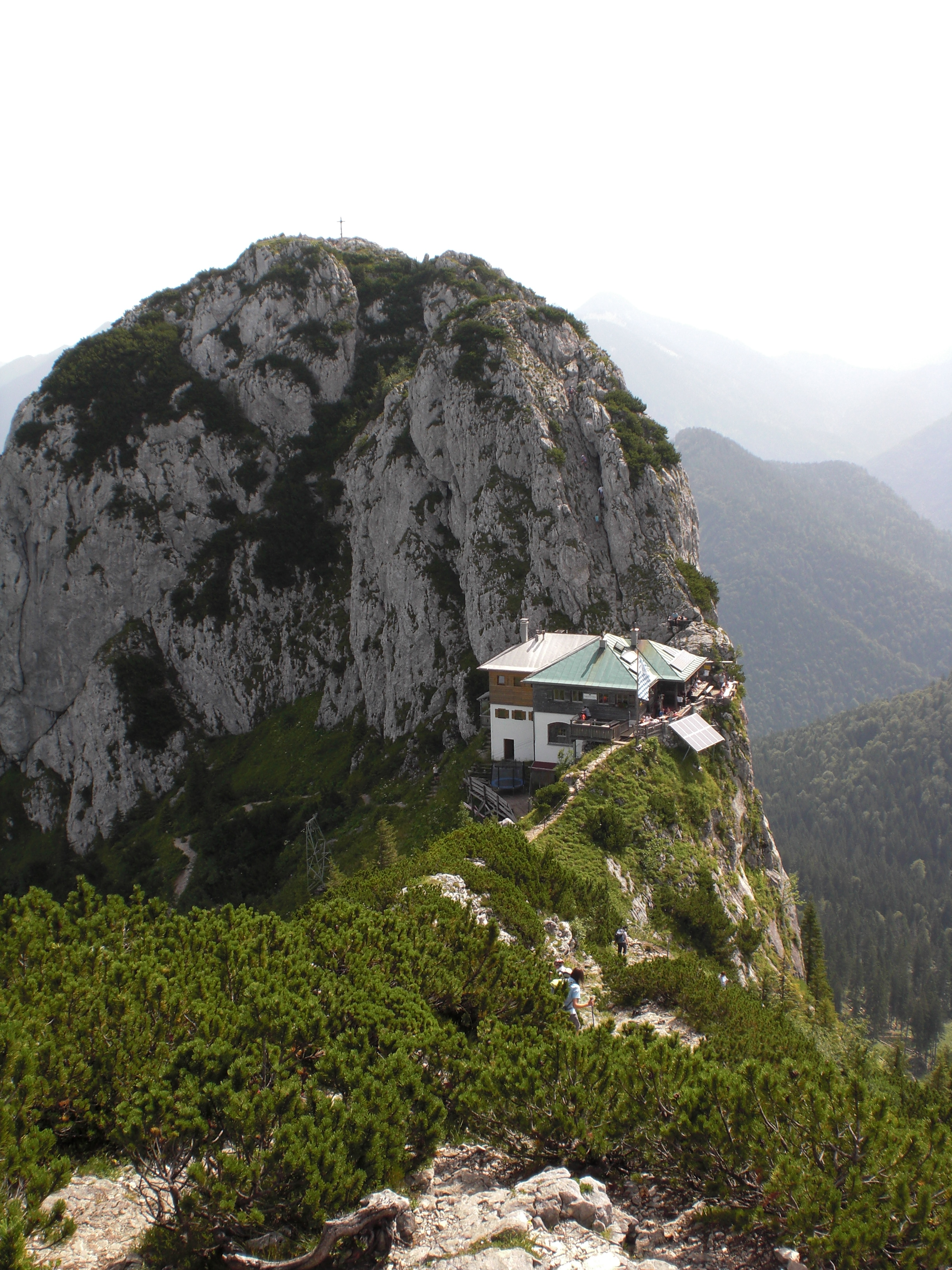
The Tegernsee cabin (German: Tegernseer Hütte) and the Buchstein.
