= Hochiss =

Highest mountain of the Brandenberg Alps

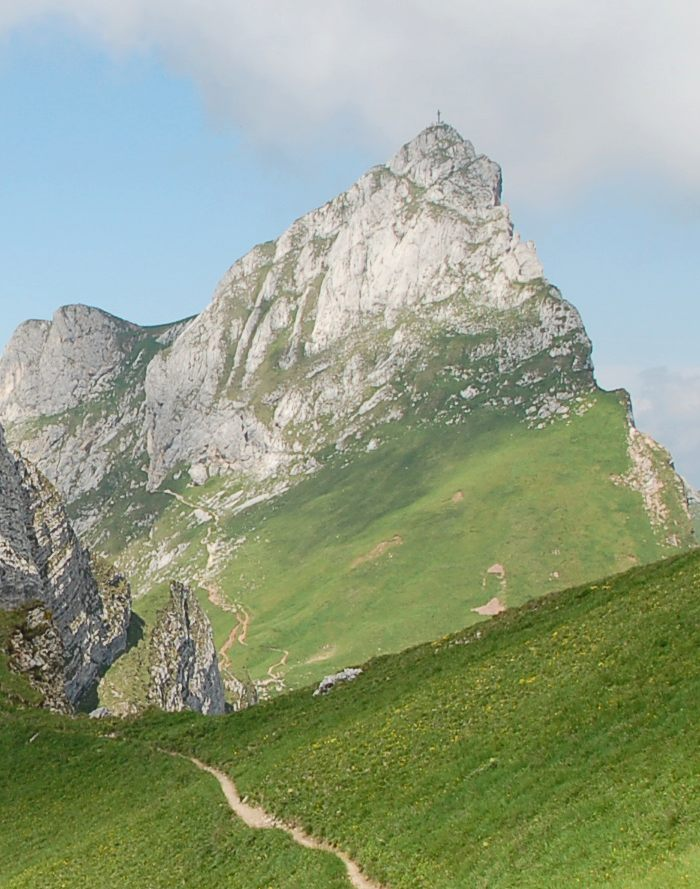
- Hochiss

Highest point
- Elevation: 2,299 m (7,543 ft)
- Prominence: 1,359 m (4,459 ft)
- Coordinates: 47°27′N 11°46′E

Geography
- Location within Alps
- Location: Tyrol, Austria
- Parent range: Brandenberg Alps

Hochiss or Hochriss is a mountain in Tyrol, Austria. Rising some 2,299 metres (7,543 ft), it is the highest mountain of the Brandenberg Alps (otherwise known as Rofan) and is located near the tourist hot spot Achensee. Its steep north face is popular with rock climbers and its other slopes are a popular destination for hiking and paragliding as well as snowshoeing and ski touring in the winter.
