= Schönberg (Bavarian Prealps) =

Coordinates: 47°38′20″N 11°38′38″E

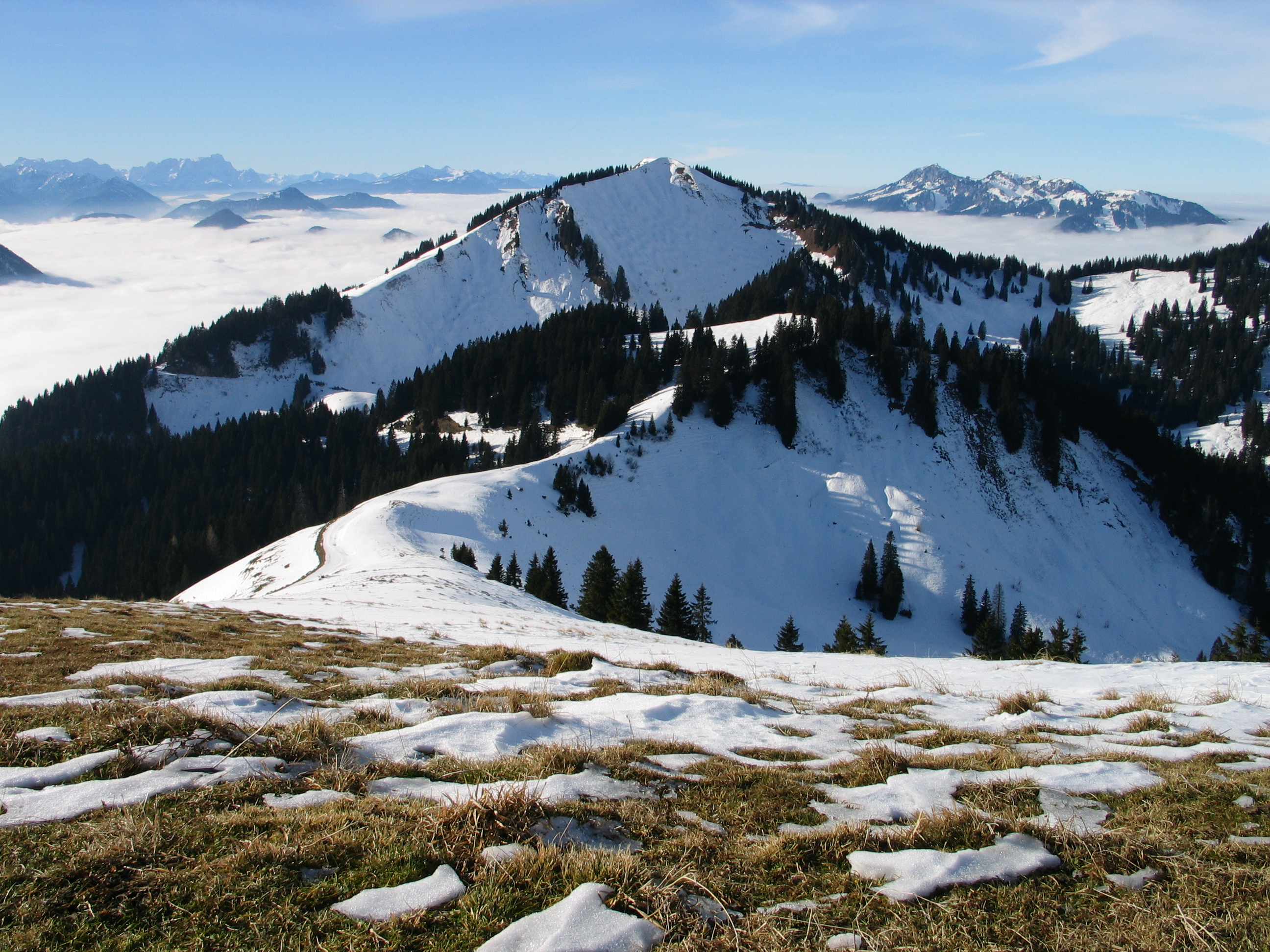

Highest point
- Elevation: 1,620 m (5,310 ft)

Geography
- Location: Bavaria, Germany

Schönberg (German pronunciation: [ˈʃøːnbɛʁk]) is a mountain of the Tegernsee Mountains in Bavaria, Germany.
