= Zireiner See =

Lake in Tyrol, Austria

- Jewel of Rofan, Blue Eye of Rofan
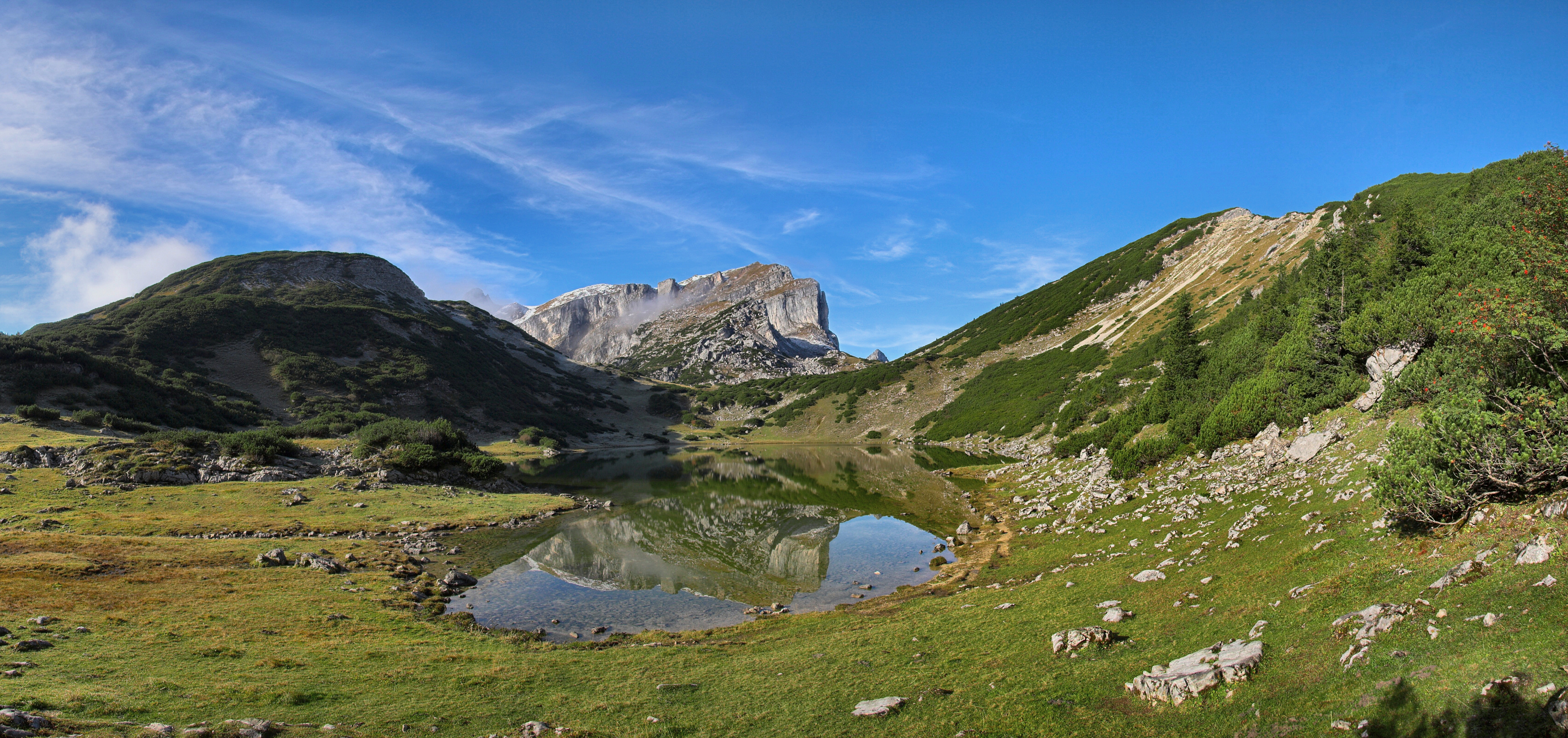
- View of Zireiner See looking westward with Rofanturm/Rofanspitze (center), Marchspitze (right), and Latschberg (left) in the background

- Location within Austria
- Location: Tyrol, Austria
- Coordinates: 47°28′N 11°49′E
- Type: lake
- Primary inflows: Natural spring
- Surface area: 4 hectares (9.9 acres)
- Surface elevation: 1,799 metres (5,902 ft)

Zireiner See (also known as the Jewel of Rofan or Blue Eye of Rofan) is a mountain lake in Tyrol, Austria, located in the Brandenberg Alps at an elevation of 1,799 metres (5,902 ft) above sea level. It covers an area of approximately 4 hectares (9.9 acres), sitting in a hollow bounded by Rosskogel at 1,940 m (6,365 ft) to the east, Latschberg at 1,944 m (6,378 ft) to the south, Rofanspitze at 2,259 m (7,411 ft) to the southwest, and the foothills of Marchspitze at 2,004 m (6,575 ft) to the west and north. At its western end, the lake is fed by a natural spring.

== Geography and Access ==
Accessing the lake became significantly more difficult after the closure of the Sonnwendjochbahn I and II chairlift system, which ceased operations in 2015 before its permanent closure was officially confirmed in 2016. While the former route from the Sonnwendjochbahn II's top station required a 1.5-hour round-trip walk, reaching the lake from the same valley floor trailhead (a parking lot in Kramsach) now requires an 8.5-hour round-trip hike with 1,438 metres (4,718 ft) of elevation change.

One of the fastest access routes is a 4-to-5-hour round-trip hike from the top station of the Rofan Cable Car (Erfurter Hütte) via the Schafsteig trail.

The lake is a waypoint on Stage 07 of the Eagle Walk (Adlerweg) between Jausenstation Waldhäusl and Erfurter Hütte, as well as on the E4 European long-distance trail's stage between Steinberg am Rofan and Maurach.

== Culture and Legend ==
A local legend tells the story of a shepherd who used clay from the Zireiner See to repair his house and build a stove on the advice of a mysterious stranger. The following morning, the clay had transformed into gold. According to the tale, when the shepherd returned to the lake to gather more, the transmuting clay had disappeared.
