= Fockenstein =

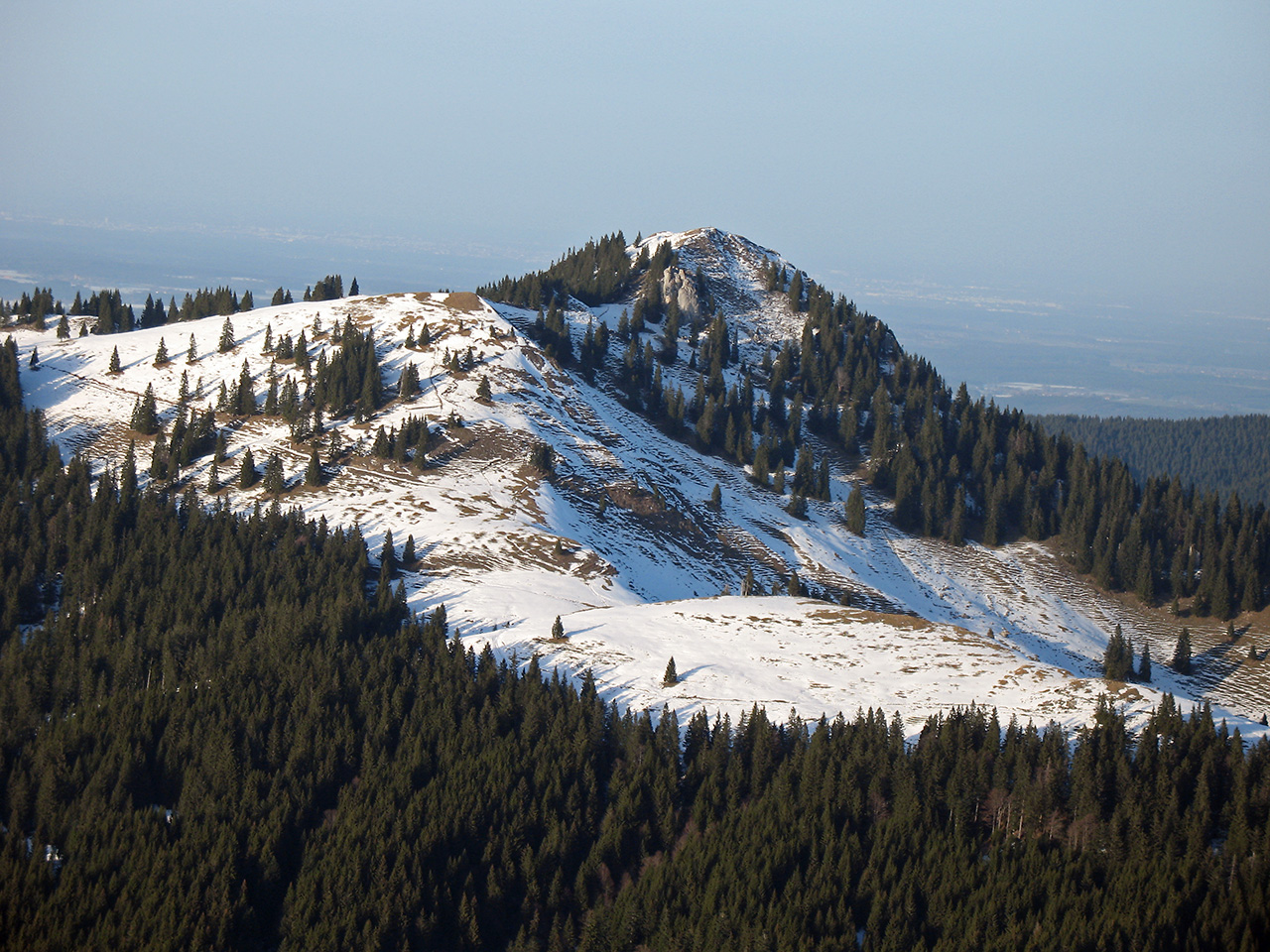

Highest point
- Elevation: 1,564 m (5,131 ft)
- Prominence: 308 m (1,010 ft)
- Coordinates: 47°41′5″N 11°39′9″E

Geography
- Location: Bavaria, Germany

Climbing
- Easiest route: Hike

Fockenstein is a 1,564-metre-high (5,131 ft) mountain in Bavaria, Germany. It is located in what is called the Bavarian Prealps, west of the lake Tegernsee.

== Geography and climbing ==
The summit is on the border between the municipalities of Gaißach and Bad Wiessee. It is usually climbed from Bad Wiessee but can also be climbed from Lenggries via Geierstein. Fockenstein is also often climbed in winter, especially as part of a rather easy ski tour. While the path to the Aueralm can usually be mastered without any problems, the steep summit slopes must be assessed for avalanche danger. The Maximiliansweg from Füssen to Königssee also leads over the Fockenstein. In summer, two hours are required for the ascent from Bad Wiessee and 1.5 hours for the descent. From Lenggries (from Hohenburg Castle) over the Hirschtalsattel the ascent takes about 2.5 hours and the descent about two hours.

== Photos ==
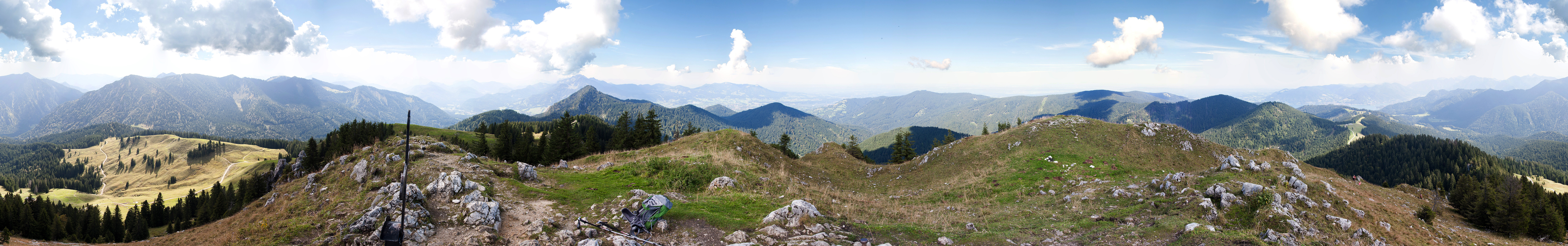
360 degree panorama from the peak of Fockenstein
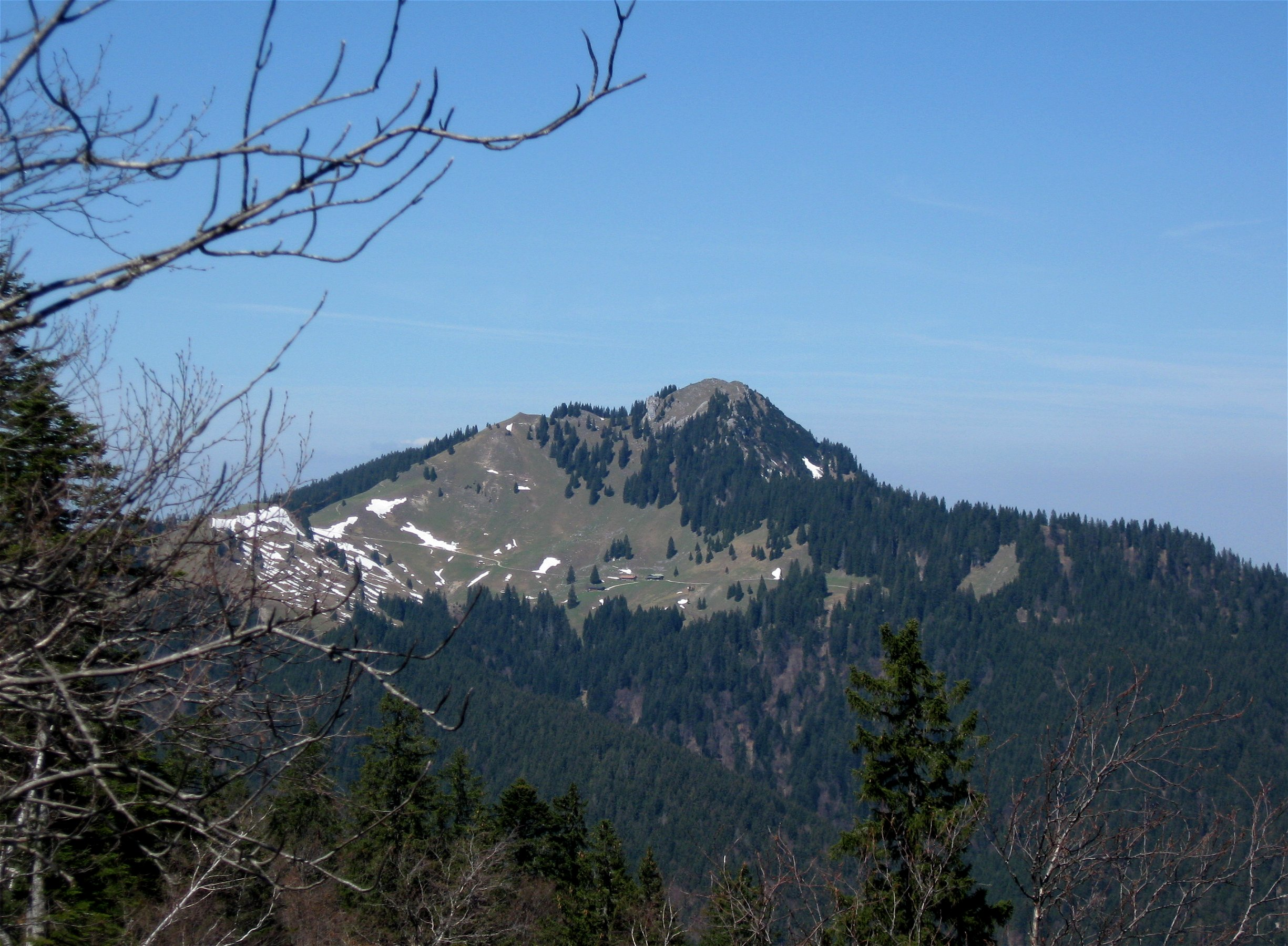
Fockenstein and Neuhüttenalm, as seen from Hirschberg

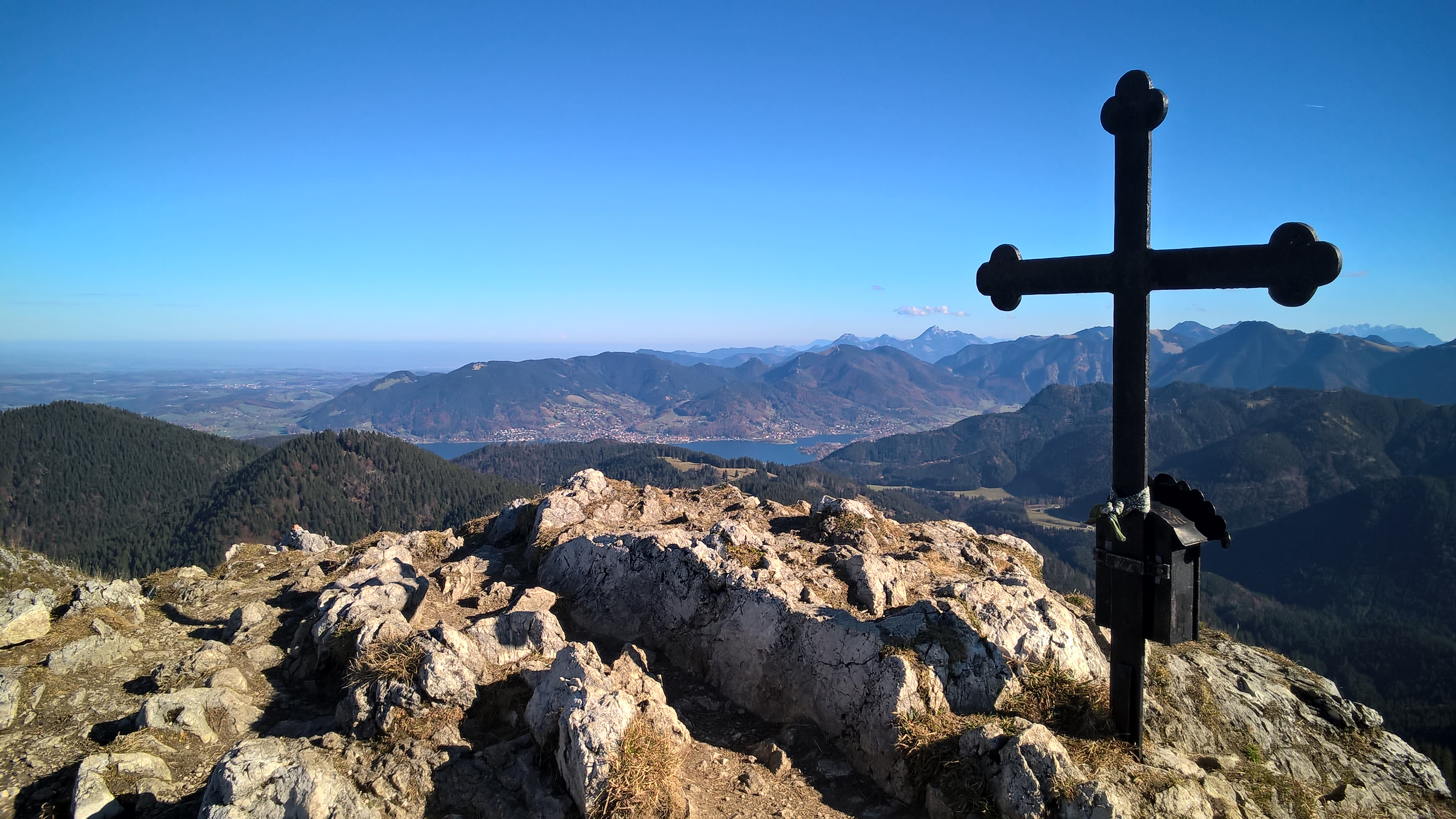
Summit cross with Tegernsee in the background

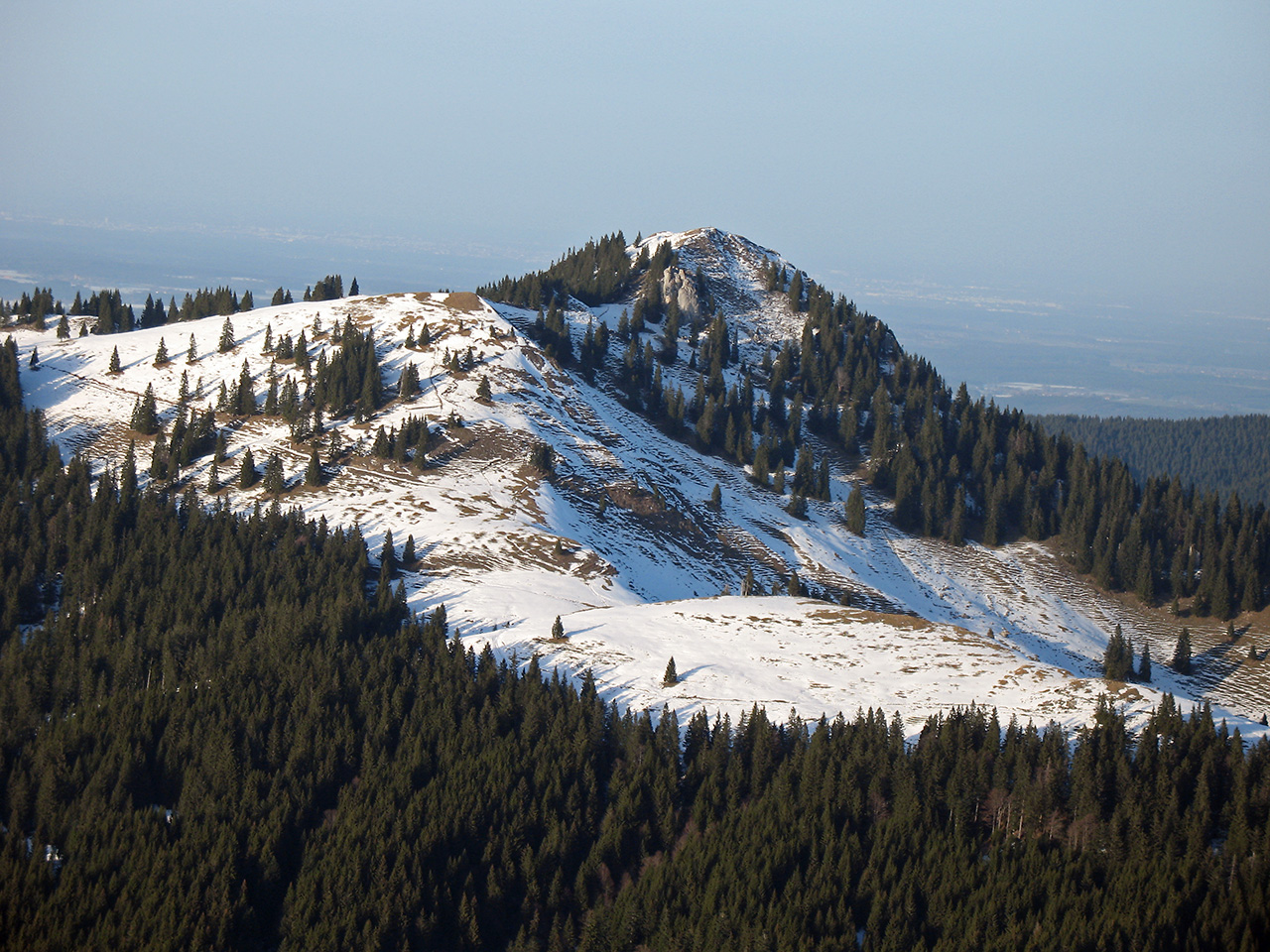
South slope
