= Geierstein =

Mountain in Bavaria, Germany

Coordinates: 47°41′N 11°37′E

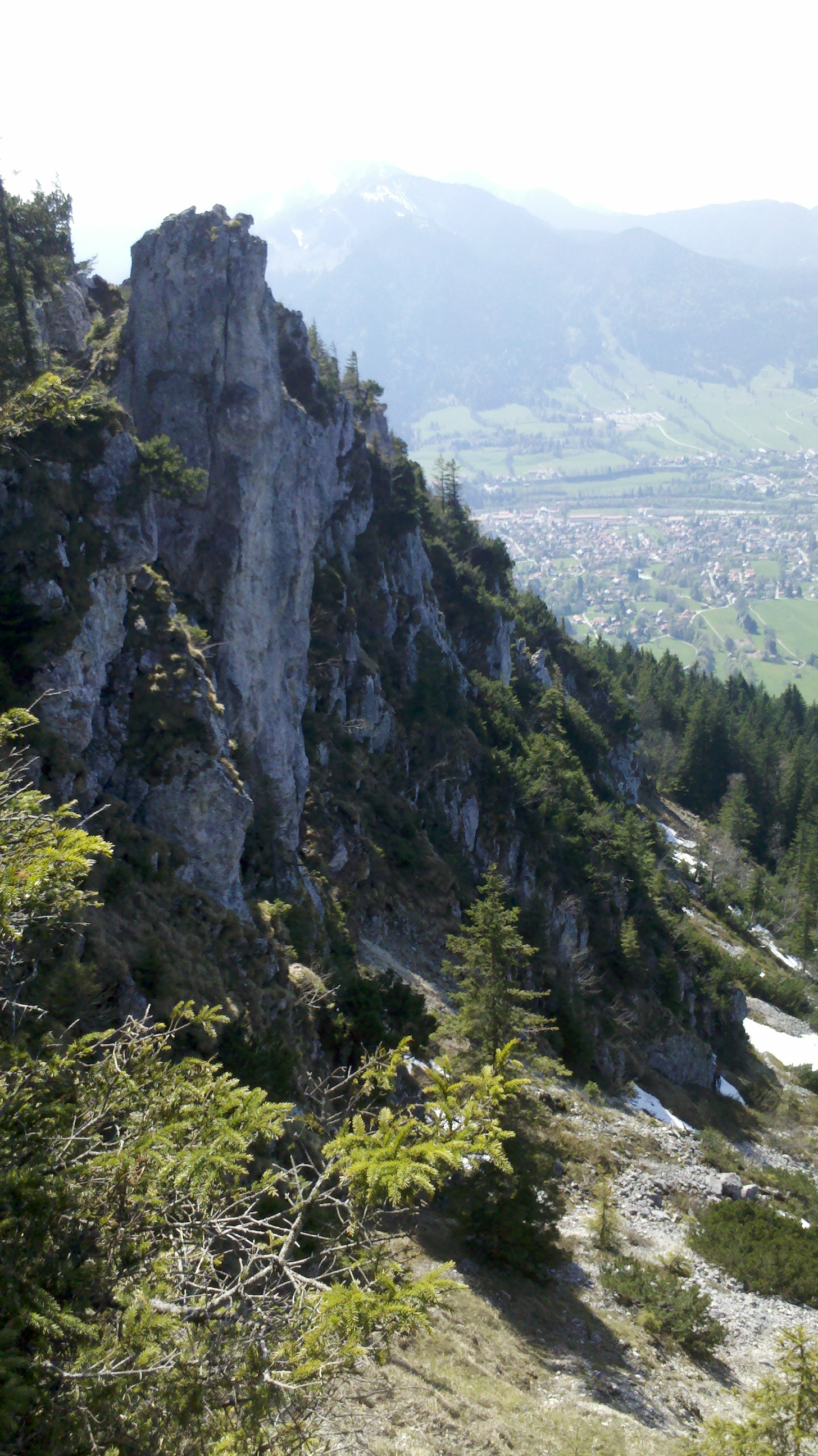
- Geierstein, north face

Highest point
- Elevation: 1,491 m (4,892 ft)
- Prominence: 215 m (705 ft)

Geography
- Location: Bavaria, Germany
- Parent range: Mangfall Mountains

Climbing
- Easiest route: Hike

Geierstein (also Geigerstein) is a 1,491 m high mountain in the western Mangfall Mountains, part of the Bavarian Prealps, in Bavaria, Germany.

== Geography ==
Geierstein is part of an east–west ridge with steep drop-offs to the north and south. It is the first prominent mountain peak coming out of Lenggries. The ridge is interrupted to the east by the Sommersbachgraben at 1,261 m. East of this drop, the ridge rises again to its highest peak, Fockenstein.

The Geierstein is almost completely forested; only in the immediate vicinity of the summit does bare limestone emerge from the forest floor.

The summit offers a view of the entire Isarwinkel, the Munich gravel plain (with a view of Munich on a clear day), the Tegernsee mountains, and Wetterstein and Karwendel.

== Name ==
The name of the mountain is sometimes written as Geigerstein (literally "Violinist Rock"), instead of Geierstein (literally "Vulture Rock"). Both names are present in the German Alpine Club map and guidebook, with Geierstein in larger type. A legend about the mountain describes a violin-playing hermit whose eye was scratched out by an eagle.

== Climbing ==
Geierstein can be climbed from the town of Lenggries to its west via Reitenbach or Markeck. The path via Reitenbach is a well-marked path that is almost entirely in the woods until the last 100 m below the summit; it involves 800 m total of climbing and takes about two and a half hours. The path via Markeck also requires about 800 m of climbing and two and a half hours' time, but is steeper and more difficult. Both routes require sure-footedness near the peak.
