= Hirschberg (Bavaria) =

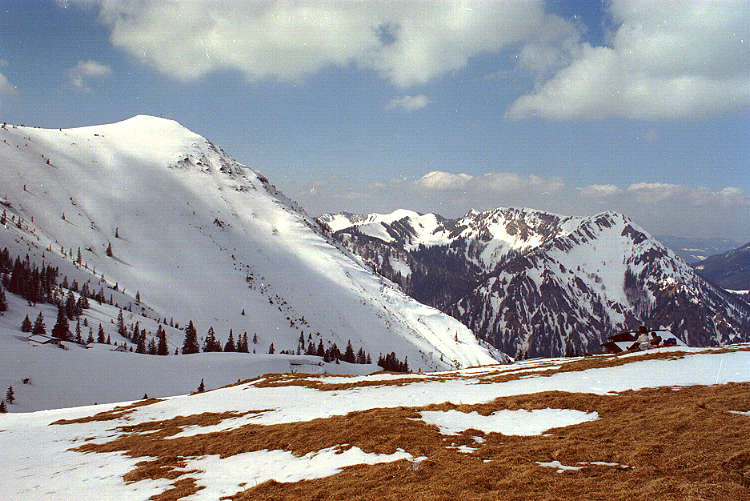
- The summit of the Hirschberg. In the background: the Kampen

Highest point
- Elevation: 1,670 m (5,480 ft)
- Coordinates: 47°39′37.85″N 11°41′46.41″E

Geography
- Location within Alps
- Location: Bavaria, Germany
- Parent range: Mangfallgebirge (Tegernsee Mountains)

Climbing
- Easiest route: Hike

The Hirschberg (German pronunciation: [ˈhɪʁʃˌbɛʁk]) is a 1,670-metre-high (5,479 ft) mountain in the Bavarian Fore-alps south of Lake Tegernsee.

The summit may be reached via a gentle mountain path either from Scharling, Kreuth or Bad Wiessee, all three routes being classified as not difficult. Below the summit at a height of 1,520 m is the Hirschberghaus restaurant, which is open all-year. The Hirschberg is the Tegernsee's observation point with an extensive panorama in all directions of the compass. In winter it is climbed by skiers from Kreuth via the Rauheck Alm or on foot from Scharling. The path is a gentle walk via the toboggan run (Rodelbahn) as far as Hirschlacke, then becomes steep and, in places, icy as it runs along the so-called Kratzer to the Hirschberghaus and finally along the open ridge to the summit. The summer route is susceptible to avalanches in winter and should not be used at that time of year.

The aforementioned Kratzer is a 1,544 m high sub-peak of the Hirschberg with a summit cross and the Hirschberghaus.
