= Krummsee (Bezirk Kufstein) =

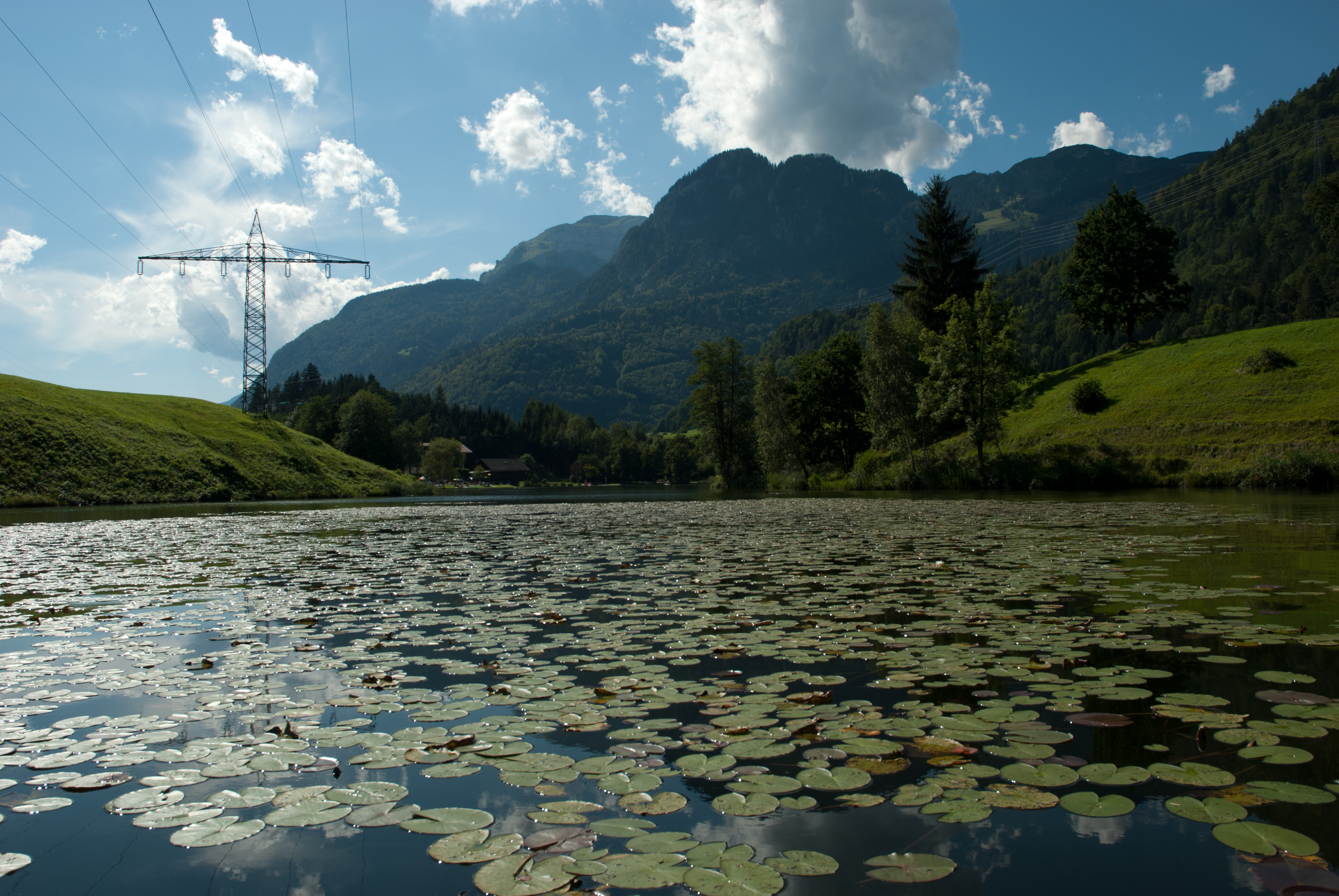

- Location within Tyrol, Austria
- Location: Tyrol, Austria
- Coordinates: 47°27′26″N 11°53′05″E

Krummsee (Bezirk Kufstein) is a lake of Tyrol, Austria.
