= Steinberg am Rofan =

- Municipality
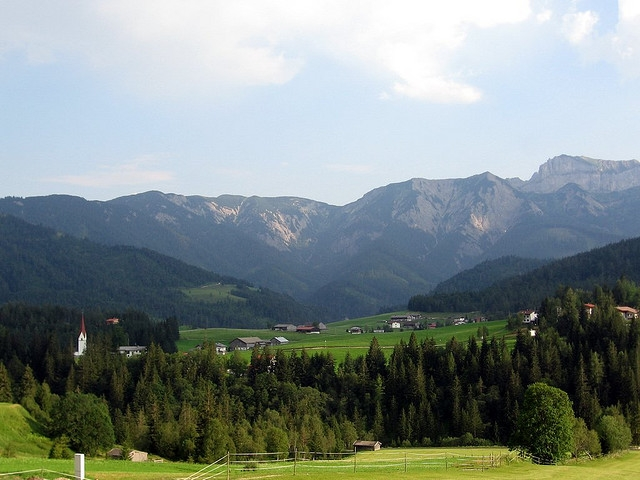

- Coat of arms

- Location within Austria
- Coordinates: 47°30′55″N 11°47′46″E
- Country: Austria
- State: Tyrol
- District: Schwaz

Government
  - Mayor: Helmut Margreiter

Area
  - Total: 68.6 km^{2} (26.5 sq mi)
- Elevation: 1,010 m (3,310 ft)

Population (2022)
  - Total: 288
  - Density: 4.20/km^{2} (10.9/sq mi)
- Time zone: UTC+1 (CET)
  - Summer (DST): UTC+2 (CEST)
- Postal code: 6215
- Area code: 05272
- Vehicle registration: SZ
- Website: www.steinberg. tirol.gv.at

Steinberg am Rofan is a municipality and a small village in the Schwaz district in the Austrian state of Tyrol. The main economic factors are tourism and agriculture.

As of 2022, the municipality had 288 inhabitants plus tourists.

... "am Rofan" refers to Rofangebirge (part of Brandenberg Alps) which is nearby.
