= Leonhardstein =

Coordinates: 47°38′00″N 11°43′08″E

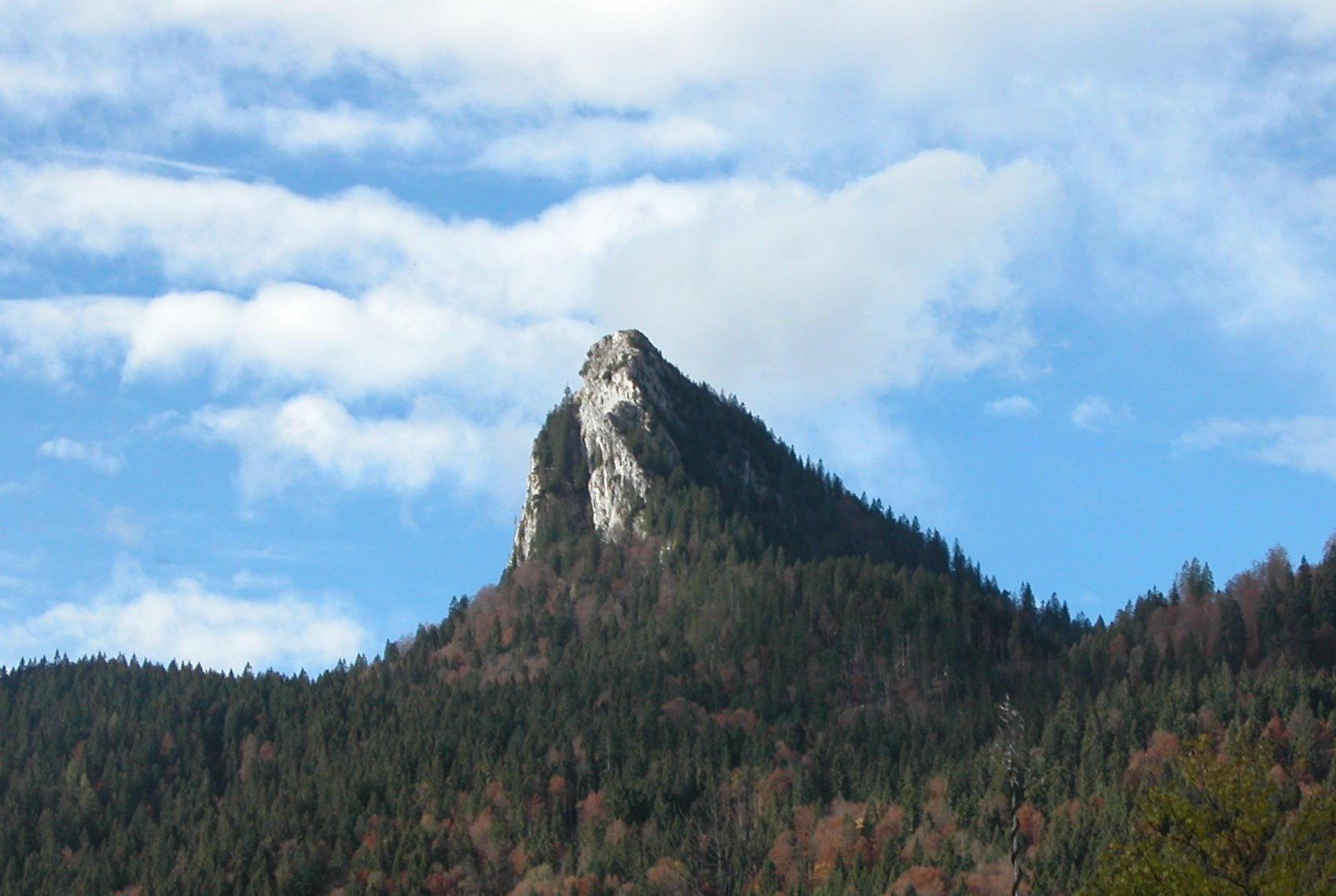
- The Leonhardstein west of Kreuth

Highest point
- Elevation: 1,449 m (4,754 ft)

Geography
- Location: Bavaria, Germany

Leonhardstein is a mountain of Bavaria, Germany, near Kreuth.
