= Brandenberg Alps =

Austrian mountain group

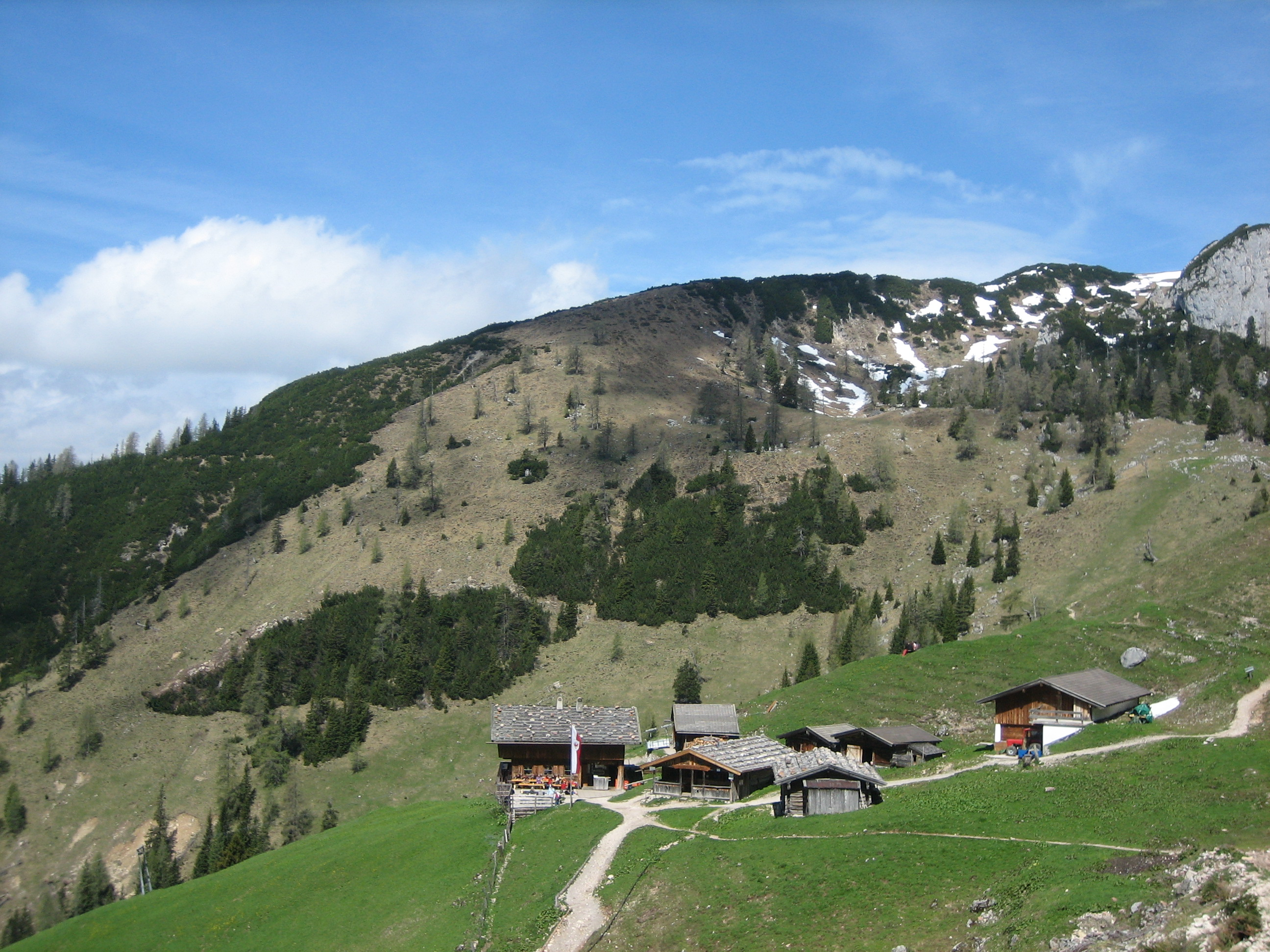
- The Dalfazalm, 1,693 m, Rofan range (Brandenberg Alps), Austria

Highest point
- Peak: Hochiss
- Elevation: 2,299 m above sea level (AA)

Dimensions
- Length: 38 km (24 mi)

Geography
- Location within Austria
- Country: Austria
- Region: Tyrol
- Range coordinates: 47°32′12″N 11°52′33″E
- Parent range: Northern Limestone Alps

The Brandenberg Alps (German: Brandenberger Alpen) are a sub-group of the Northern Limestone Alps, that run in front of the Eastern Alps for their whole length. They lie entirely in Austria between Achensee in Tyrol, the Inn Valley and the Bavarian Prealps.

They are widely known in German as the Rofangebirge, although the actual Rofan (also Sonnwendgebirge) is only the western part of the area between the Brandenberger Ache stream and the Achensee lake. It consists of a central mountain group and three individual mountains. The Guffert (2,195 m (7,201 ft)), which is located outside the central group, forms a distinct mountain block. It is located north of Kramsach, between the Tegernsee Blauberge and the central Rofan. The Unnütze, at the northern end of the Achensee east of Achenkirch, and the Ebener Joch (1,957 m (6,421 ft)) east of Maurach at the southern end of the Achensee, are also outside the central mountain range.

== Neighbouring mountain ranges ==
The Brandenberg Alps border on the following other sub-groups in the Alps:

- Bavarian Prealps (to the north)
- Kaisergebirge (to the east)
- Kitzbühel Alps (to the south)
- Tux Alps (to the southwest)
- Karwendel (to the west)

== Central Group ==
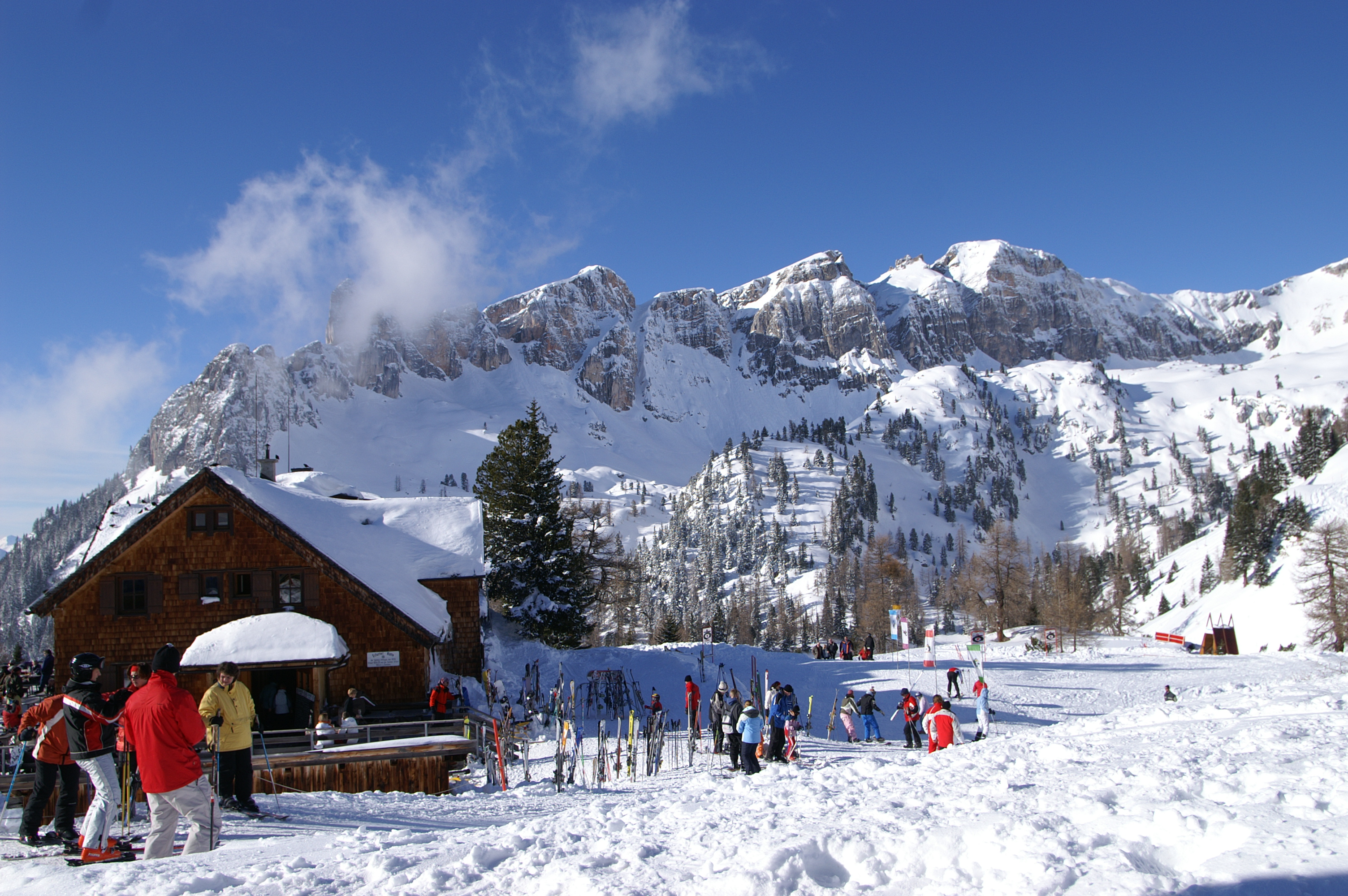
The Dalfazer Wände in the Rofangebirge

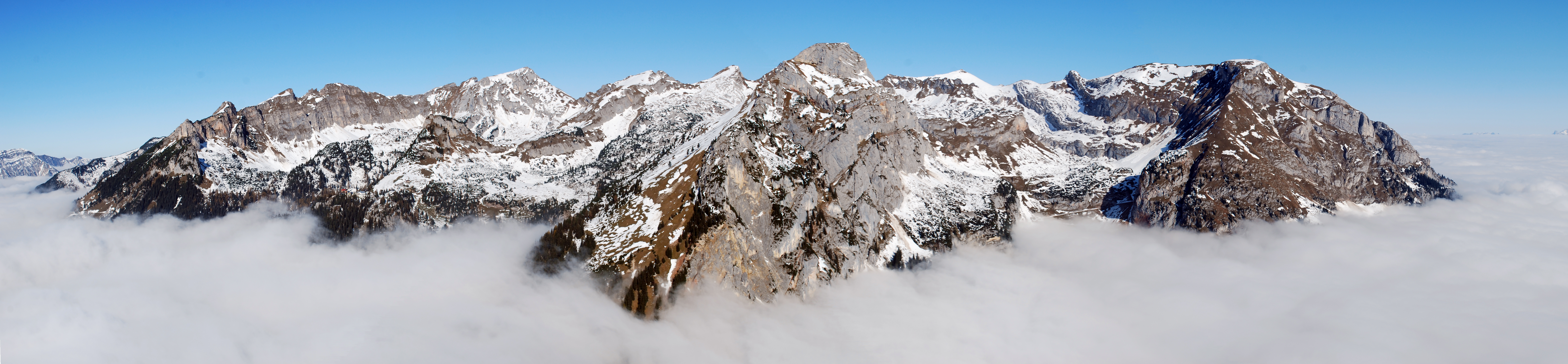
Main Rofan group seen from the southwest (Ebner Joch). Left to right: Dalfaz Walls; Streichkopf, Hochiss, Spieljoch, Seekarlspitze, Haidachstellwand, Rofanspitze, Sagzahn, Vorderes Sonnwendjoch

=== Summits on the Rofan main ridge (Rofan-Hauptkamm) from west to east ===
- Klobenjochspitze (2,041 m (6,696 ft))
- Kotalmjoch (2,122 m (6,962 ft))
- Stuhljöchl (2,157 m (7,077 ft))
- Stuhlböcklkopf (2,169 m (7,116 ft))
- Streichkopf (2,243 m (7,359 ft))
- Hochiss (2,299 m (7,543 ft)), highest summit in the Rofan
- Spieljoch (2,236 m (7,336 ft))
- Seekarlspitze (2,261 m (7,418 ft))
- Roßkopf (Nordgipfel 2,257 m (7,405 ft))
- Rofanspitze (2,259 m (7,411 ft))

=== Summits on the Dalfaz Walls from north to south ===
- Dalfázer Joch (2,233 m (7,326 ft))
- Dalfázer Köpfln (2,208 m (7,244 ft))
- Dalfázer Wand (2,210 m (7,250 ft))
- Dalfázer Roßkopf (2,143 m (7,031 ft))
- Rotspitze (2,067 m (6,781 ft))

=== Summits on the ridge starting south of the Rofanspitze ===
- Sagzahn (2,228 m (7,310 ft))
- Schokoladetafel (2,165 m (7,103 ft))
- Vorderes Sonnwendjoch (2,224 m (7,297 ft))
- Haidachstellwand (2,192 m (7,192 ft))

=== Summits in the Brandenberg Alps from northeast to southwest ===
- Pendling (1,563 m (5,128 ft)), southwest of Kufstein
- Köglhörndl (1,645 m (5,397 ft))
- Hundsalmjoch (1,637 m (5,371 ft))
- Kienberg (1,786 m (5,860 ft)), northeast of Brandenberg

=== Waterbodies ===
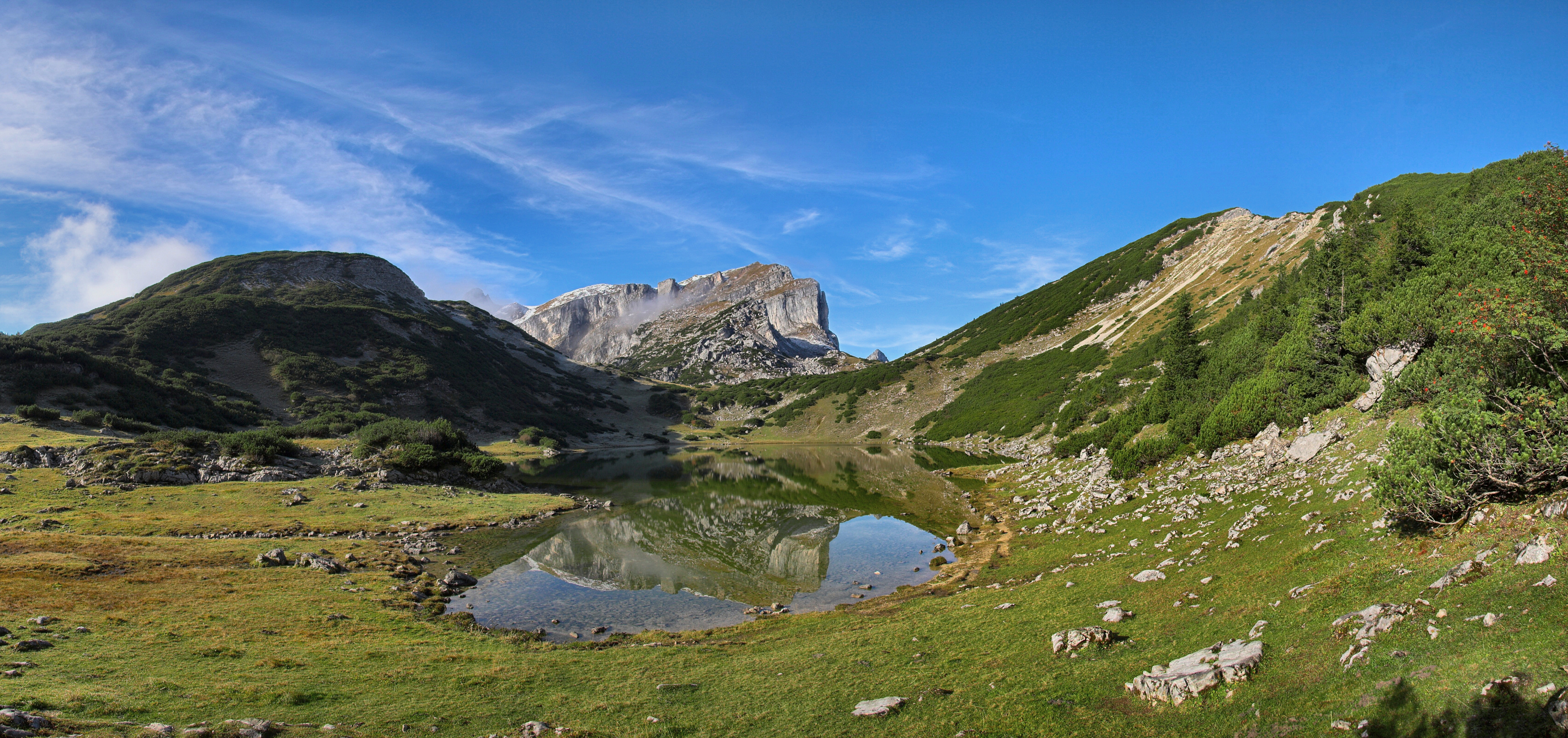
The Zireiner See in front of the east face of the Rofanspitze

- Zireiner See
