= Mittagstein =

Mountain in Germany

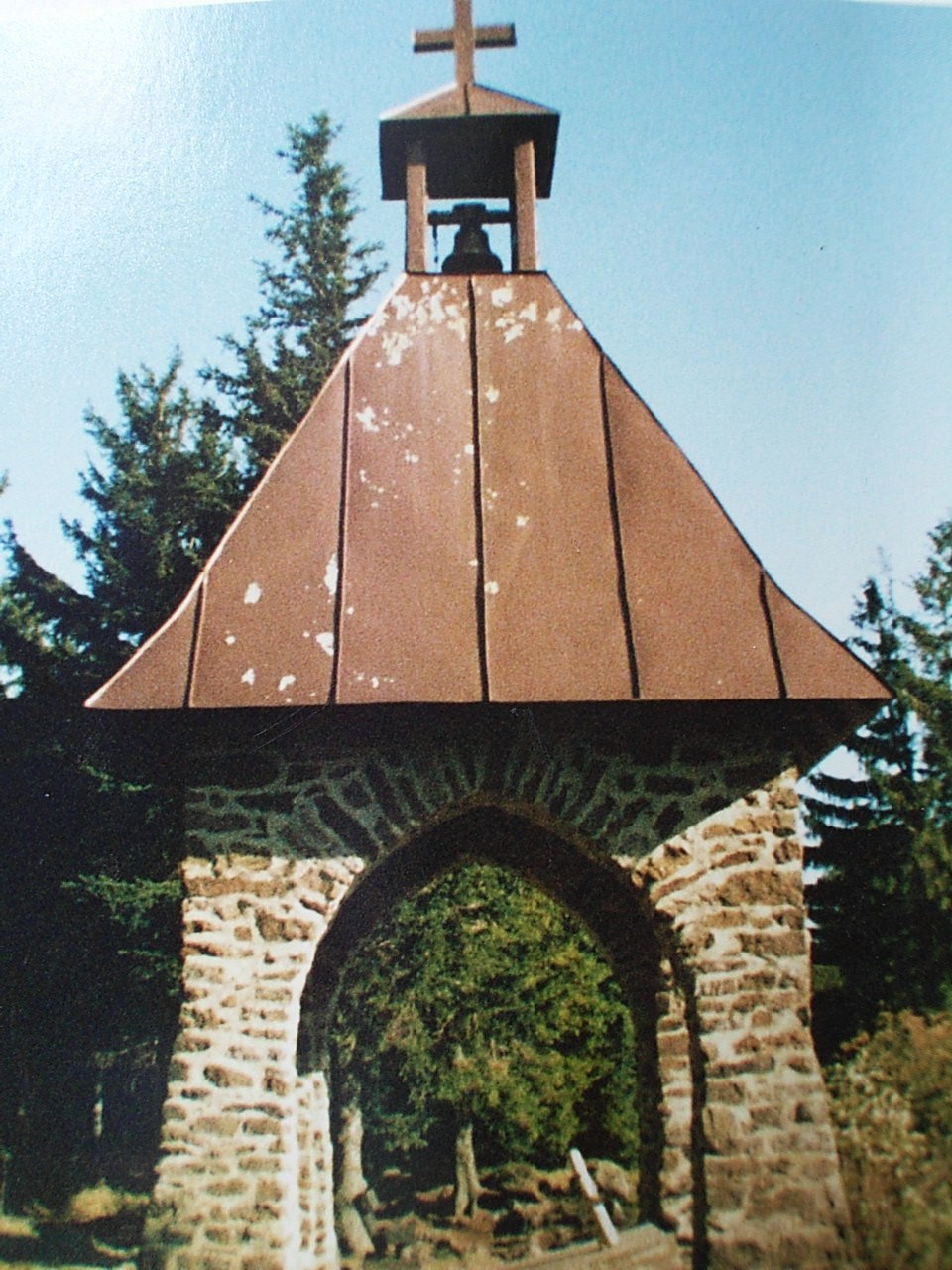
- The clock tower on the Mittagstein in honour of the fallen

Highest point
- Elevation: 1,034 m (3,392 ft)
- Coordinates: 49°10′26″N 12°56′29″E

Geography
- Location within Bavaria
- Location: Bavaria, Germany
- Parent range: Bavarian Forest

The Mittagstein is a 1,034-metre-high (3,392 ft) mountain peak which rises in the middle of the Kaitersberg in the Bavarian Forest in southern Germany.

On its forested summit is a chapel built in memory of those who have fallen in war. There is also a rocky viewpoint with views into the Zeller Valley and across to the Großer Riedelstein. Some distance below the highest point is the Kötztinger Hütte belonging to the Bavarian Forest Club (Bayerischer Wald-Verein), which is open during summer months and offers overnight accommodation.

Numerous hiking trails climb the Mittagstein, for example those from Hohenwarth, Bad Kötzting, Bärndorf and Steinbühl. A favourite of hikers is the walk along the length of the Kaitersberg ridge from Bad Kötzting following E6 European long distance path which crosses the Kreuzfelsen, the Mittagstein, the Rauchröhren and the Großer Riedelstein to Ecker Saddle.
