= Schwarzeck (Bavarian Forest) =

Mountain in Germany

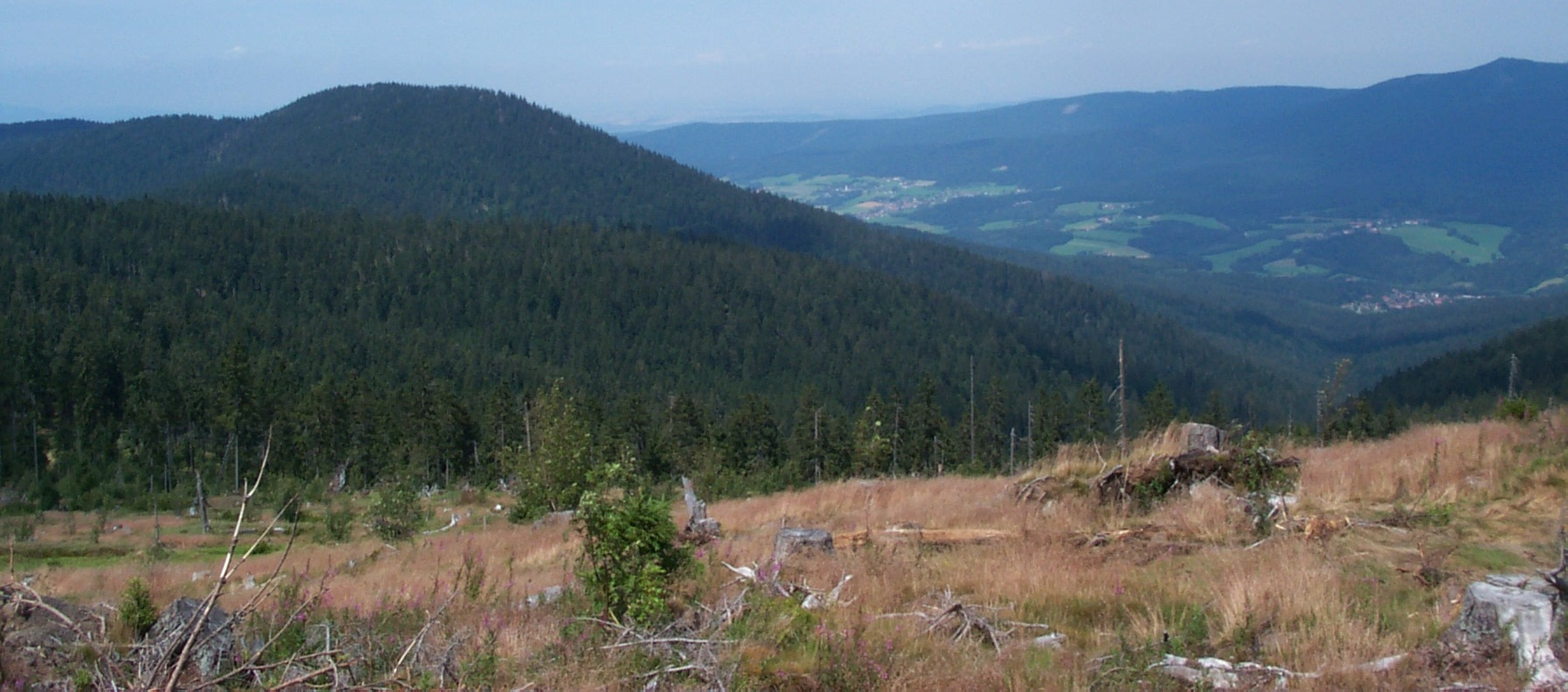
- View from the Heugstatt to the Schwarzeck (left), Lamer Corner and Osser mountain (top right)

Highest point
- Elevation: 1,238 m (4,062 ft)
- Coordinates: 49°8′48″N 13°3′52″E

Geography
- Location: Bavaria, Germany

The Schwarzeck (German for "Black Corner") is a little-known 1238 m high mountain which is located between the Heugstatt (1262 m) and Ödriegel (1156 m) mountains in the Bavarian Forest, a mountain range of medium altitude in the East of Bavaria, Germany, which is running along the Czech border.

== Description ==
The summit of the Schwarzeck is located between the municipalities of Lohberg and Arnbruck. The Schwarzeck can be explored via the E6 European long distance path from the Kleiner Arber to the Kaitersberg mountains. Other access routes lead from Arnbruck, Schareben or Lohberg to the summit.

In 1970 a cross was erected at the summit, which was renewed in 2006. Since the Cyclone Kyrill destroyed countless trees on the mountain in 2007, it is possible to view the entire Lamer corner (German:), into the Zeller Valley and all the way to the Osser mountain.

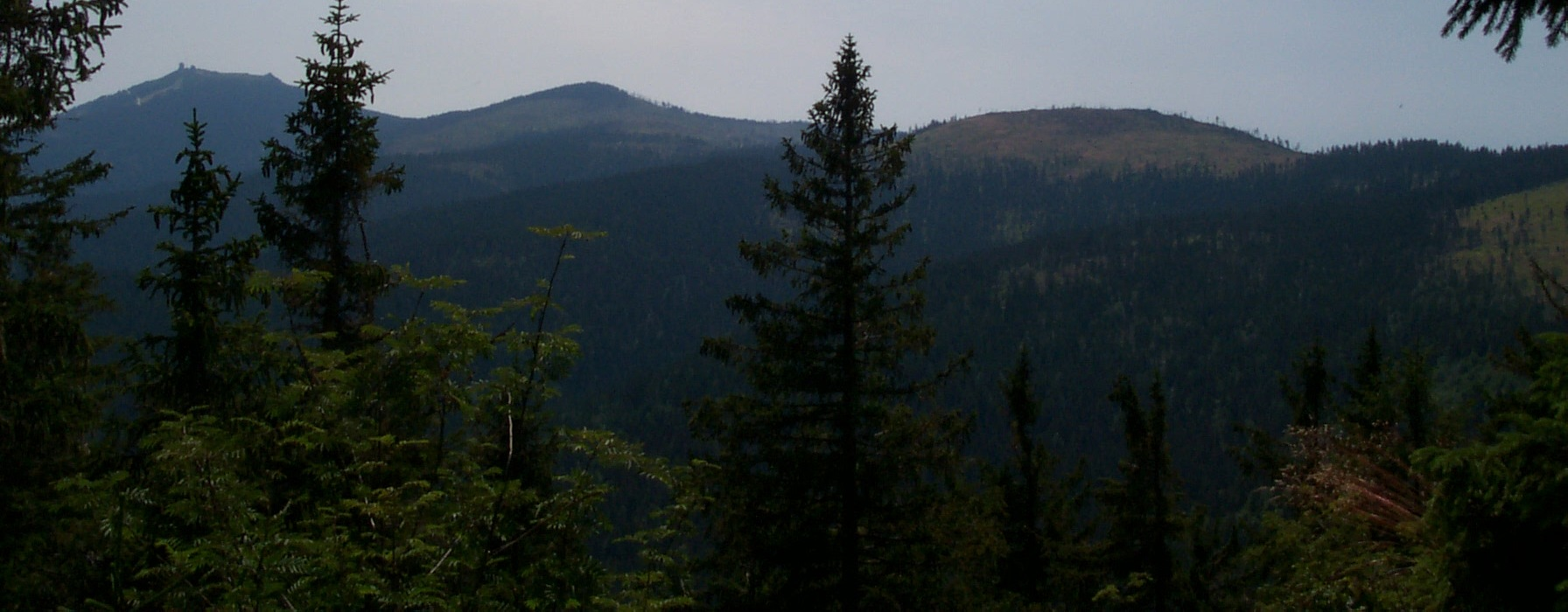
View from Schwarzeck towards Grosser Arber, Kleiner Arber, and Enzian

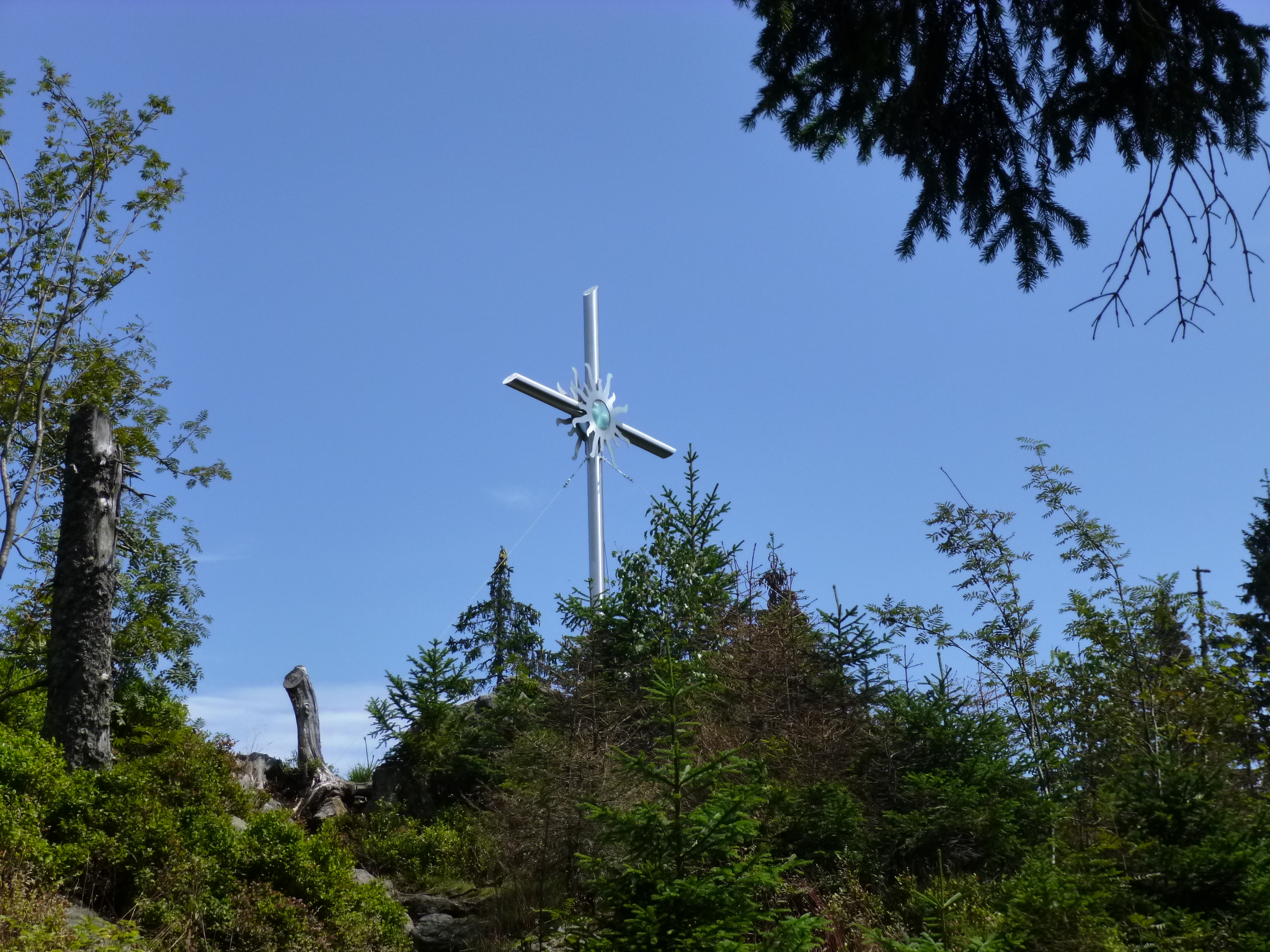
The summit cross on the Schwarzeck mountain
