= Großer Riedelstein =

Mountain in Germany

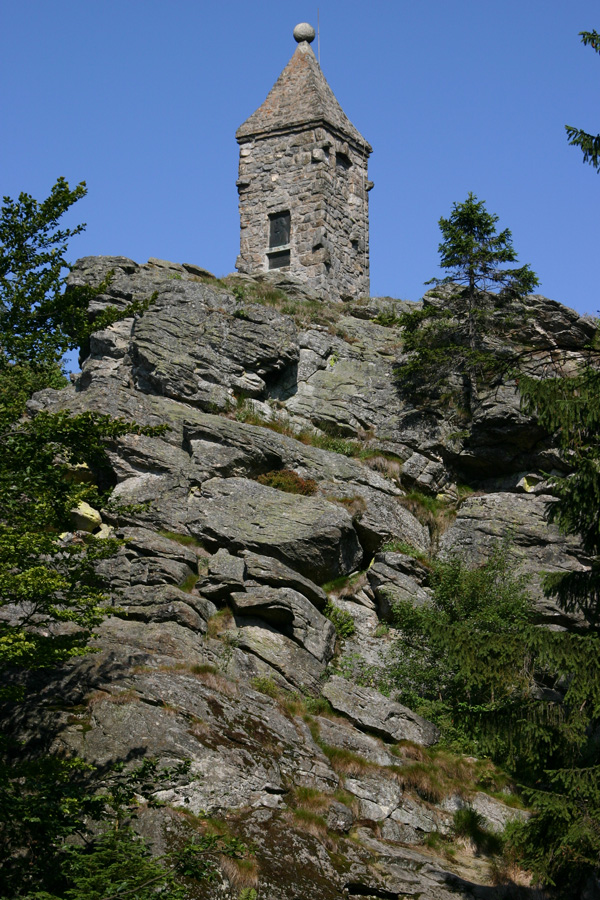
- The Waldschmidt monument at the summit

Highest point
- Elevation: 1,132 m above sea level (NN) (3,714 ft)
- Coordinates: 49°09′57″N 12°58′23″E

Geography
- Location within Bavaria
- Location: Bavaria, Germany
- Parent range: Bavarian Forest

Geology
- Mountain type: Gneiss

At 1,132 m (3,714 ft) sea level the Großer Riedelstein is the highest point on the Kaitersberg mountain ridge in the Bavarian Forest in southern Germany. Its rocky summit is decorated by a stone monument in memory of the poet, Maximilian Schmidt, known as "Forest Schmidt" (Waldschmidt).

In summer the Großer Riedelstein is a favourite hiking destination with its beautiful panoramic views in all directions. In the winter a ski lift brings skiers from the Ecker Saddle to just beneath the summit. Several hiking trails lead to the top, including those from Thalersdorf, Arnbruck and Arrach. In addition the E6 European long-distance trail passes over the Großer Riedelstein en route from Bad Kötzting to the Großen Arber.

Not far from the summit there is an important climbing area, the so-called Rauchröhren. To the south is the Kleiner Riedelstein, 1,042 m (3,419 ft).
