= Ödriegel =

Mountain in Germany

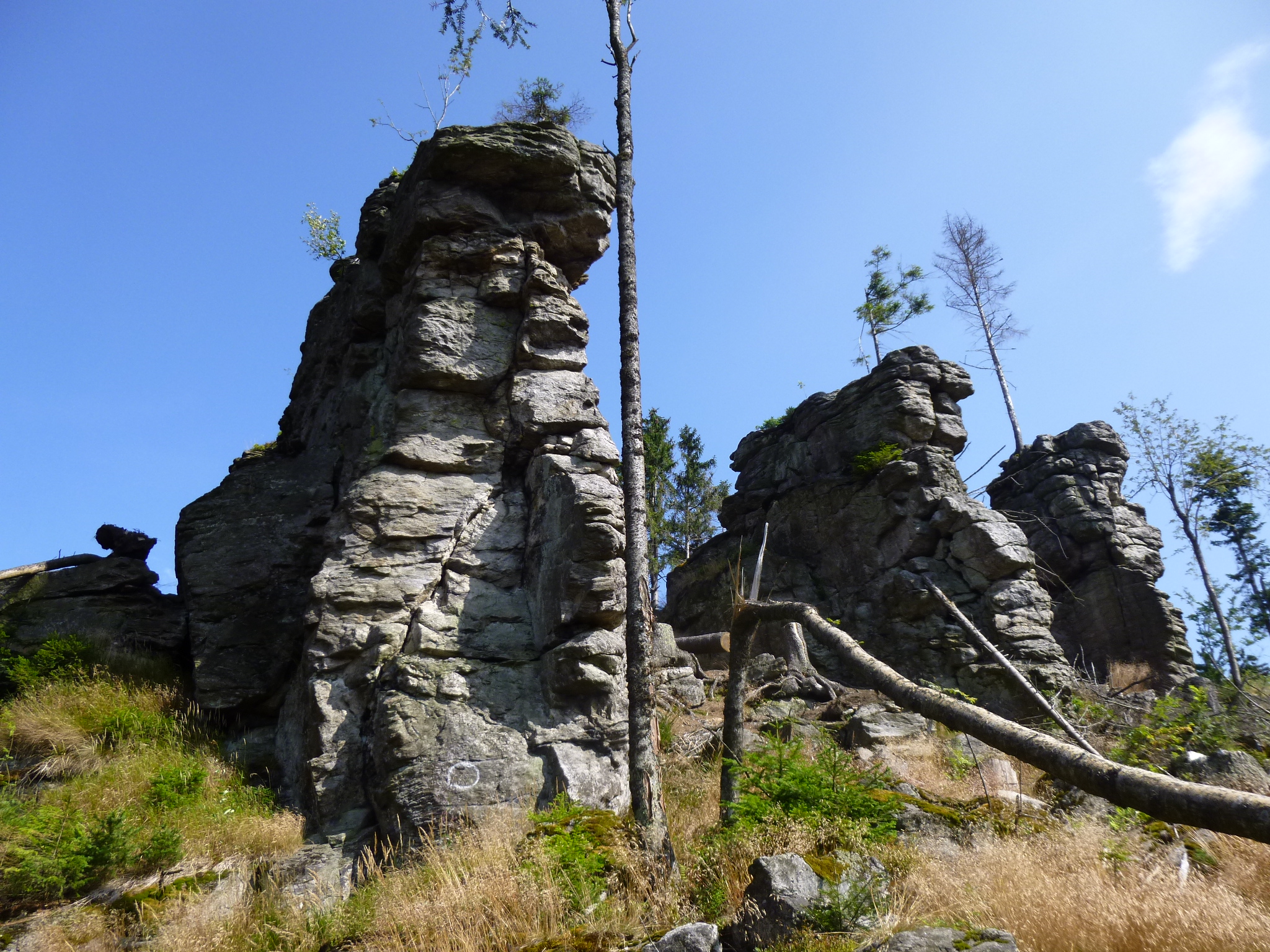

Highest point
- Elevation: 1,156 m (3,793 ft)
- Coordinates: 49°9′31″N 13°1′36″E

Geography
- Location: Bavaria, Germany

The Ödriegel is an elongated ridge of the Arber ridge in the northern Bavarian Forest. On its flat summit, there are some fantastic vistas that offer a view of Lam, the Osser and the Hohenbogen. Most hikers will pass the Ödriegel on their tour along the European Walking Route E6, from the Arber to the Kaitersberg. It is hardly ever climbed as an independent mountain, but usually in connection with its neighbours, the Mühlriegel and Schwarzeck.
