= Tauchen =

Tauchen is a surname. Notable people with the surname include:

- Gary Tauchen (born 1953), American farmer and politician
- Jaromír Tauchen (born 1981), Czech lawyer, law-historian, certified judiciary interpreter, and translator

== See also ==
- Taucher (disambiguation)
