= Kreuzfelsen =

Mountain in Germany

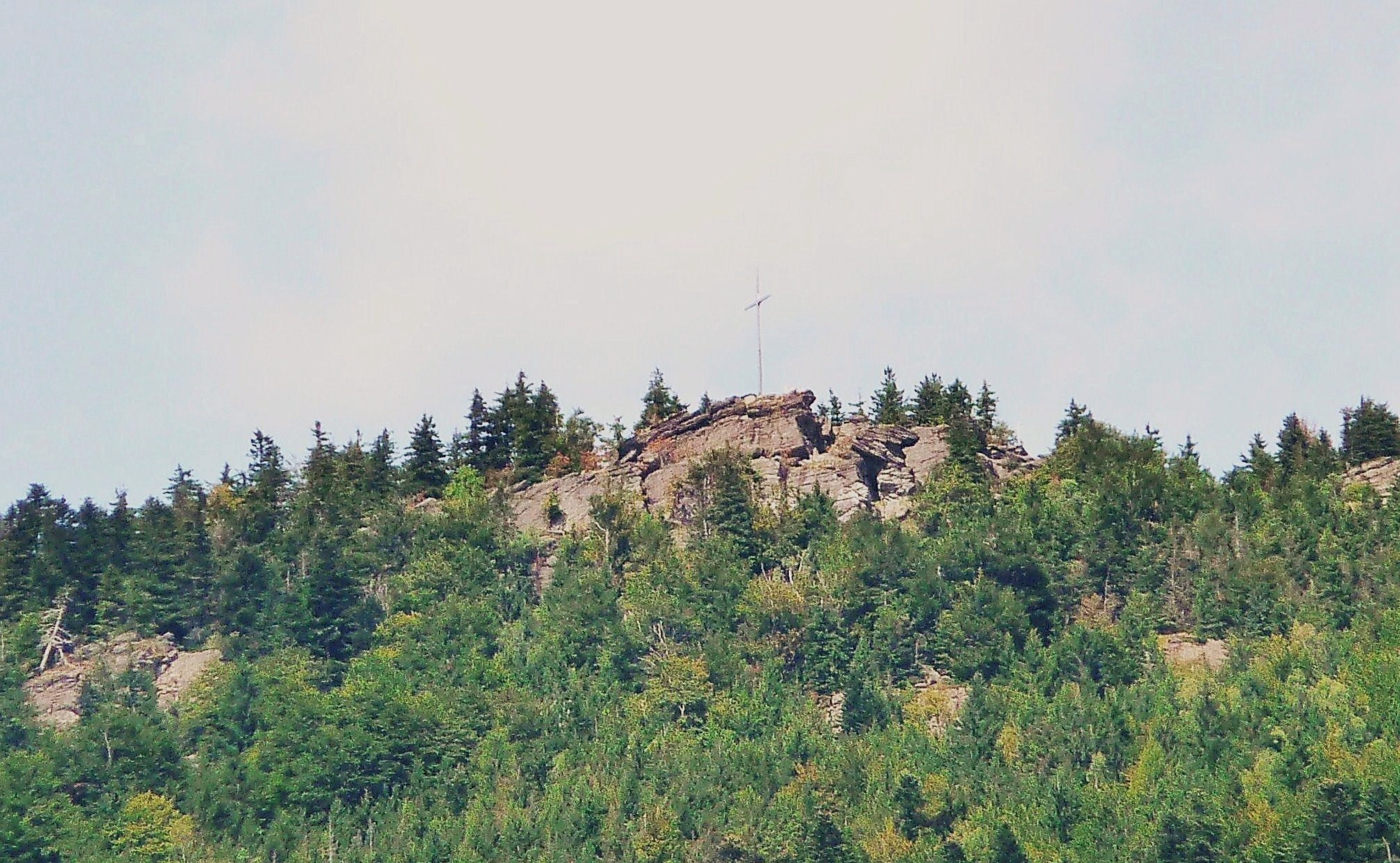
- Summit of the Kreuzfelsen from the south

Highest point
- Elevation: 999 m (3,278 ft)
- Coordinates: 49°10′35″N 12°55′22″E

Geography
- Location within Germany
- Location: Bavaria, Germany
- Parent range: Bavarian Forest

The Kreuzfelsen is a 999 m (3,278 ft) high rock outcrop, that forms the western cornerstone of the Kaitersberg mountain ridge in the Bavarian Forest in southern Germany. From the giant cross on its summit the view sweeps down into the Zeller Valley and over to the town of Bad Kötzting and also far over the western part of the Bavarian Forest.

Below the Kreuzfelsen is "Highwayman Heigl's Cave" (Räuber-Heigl's-Höhle), the hideout of a 19th-century robber. Numerous trails lead up to the summit cross, the most well-trodden being the E6 European long distance path which runs from Kötzting past the nearby Kötztinger Hütte cafe and the Riedlstein to the Großer Arber.

On the Kreuzfelsen, there is a range of sport climbing routes, many of which are well-secured and suitable for top roping.
