= Schwarzeck =

Schwarzeck may refer to:

== Places in Bavaria, Germany ==
- Schwarzeck (Ramsau), village in the municipality of Ramsau bei Berchtesgaden, Berchtesgadener Land
- Schwarzeck (Velden), village in the market borough of Velden, Landshut

== Mountains ==
- Schwarzeck (Radstädter Tauern), 2,636 m, mountain in the Hochfeind Group in Salzburg, Austria
- Schwarzeck (Loferer Steinberge), 1,565 m, mountain in the ski area of Loferer Alm, Salzburg, Austria
- Schwarzeck (Totes Gebirge), 1,537 m, mountain in the ski area of Wurzeralm, Upper Austria
- Schwarzeck (Bavarian Forest), 1,238 m, mountain on the Arber ridge, Bavaria, Germany

== See also ==
- Hochschwarzeck, a mountain and ski resort near Ramsau bei Berchtesgaden
