= Taugher =

Taugher is a surname of German origin, and an Americanized variant of Taucher. Notable people with the surname include:

- Bill Taugher (1906–1943), Canadian ice hockey player
- Claude Taugher (1895–1963), American football player
