= František Salzer =

Czech actor and director (1902–1974)

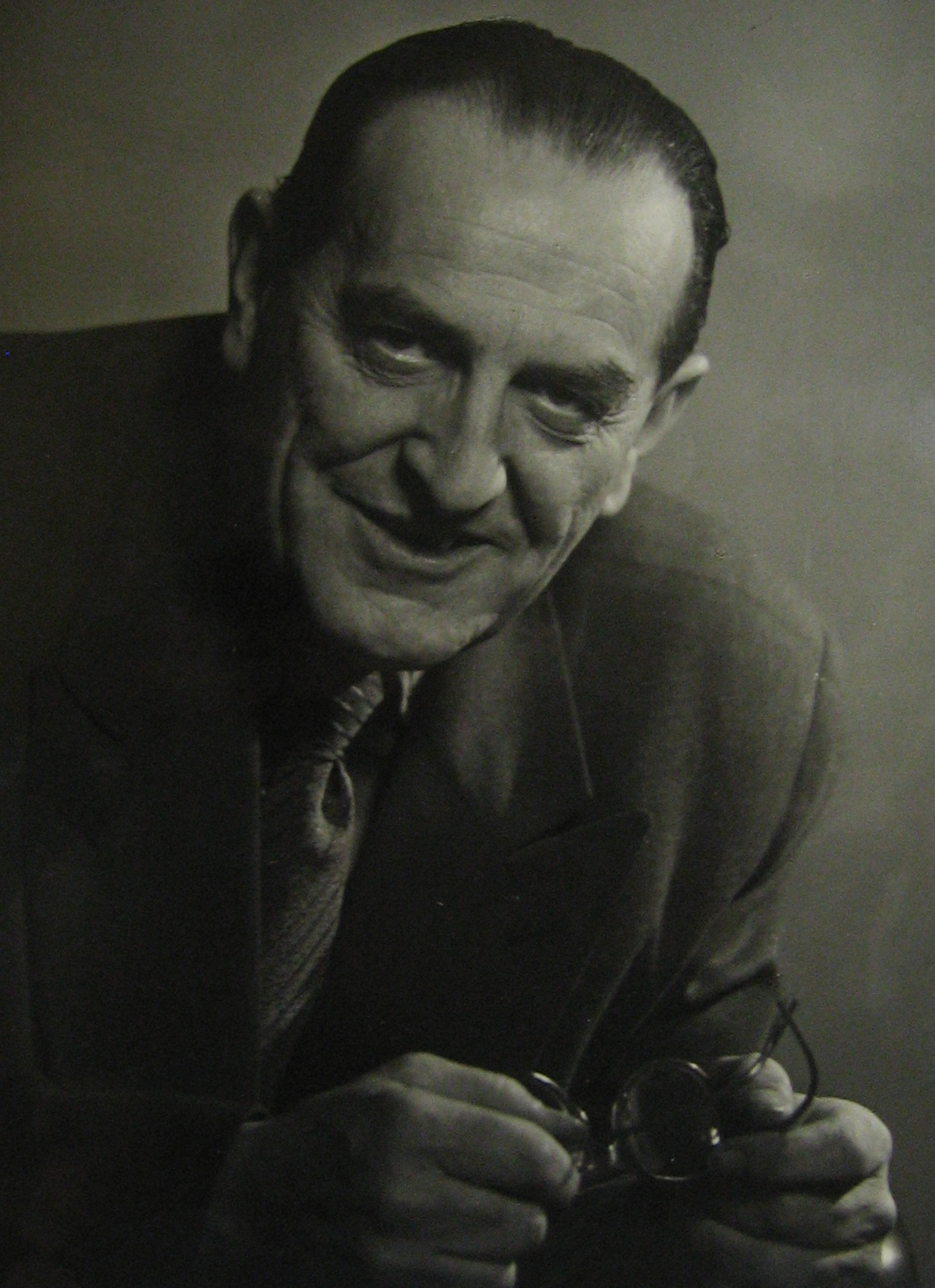
- Salzer in 1960
- Born: 30 August 1902; Sušice, Bohemia, Austria-Hungary
- Died: 23 December 1974 (aged 72); Prague, Czechoslovakia
- Occupations: Theatre director, actor, university professor, translator
- Years active: 1924–1974

František Salzer (30 August 1902 – 23 December 1974) was a Czech theatre director, actor, translator and university professor.

== Biography ==
Salzer was born on 30 August 1902 in Sušice, Bohemia, Austria-Hungary (now the Czech Republic). He studied at Prague Conservatory (1920–1924). In the season of 1924–25, he started his career at Olomouc Theatre as actor and later on as theatre director. In 1930 he came to Prague as theatre Director of Vinohrady Theatre. He stayed at Vinohrady Theatre till the end on the 2nd World War. During his time at the Vinohrady Theatre, Salzer has directed over 120 plays by world and Czech authors (incl. W. Shakespeare, Oscar Wilde, Carlo Goldoni, G. B. Shaw, F. Schiller, Stefan Zweig, Jiří Mahen, J. K. Tyl, Viktor Dyk, V. K. Klicpera, etc.)

From 1947 till 1963, he acted as the theatre director of the National Theatre in Prague.

During the years of 1941–1945 he was professor of the Prague Conservatory. He was one of the founders of the Theatre Faculty of the Academy of Performing Arts in Prague (DAMU) together with Jiří Frejka, František Tröster and Josef Träger. Then he was the Dean of this Faculty in three periods (1954–1955, 1958–1961 and 1963–1970) and acted as professor of this Faculty till his death in 1974. Salzer was also translator of theatre plays (e.g. Stefan Zweig: Ovečka chudých – Das Lamm des Armen, Fritz Hochwälder: Tlustý anděl z Rouenu – Boule de suif, etc.).

His first wife, Eva Adamcová (1895–1972), with whom he has been living for 42 years, was an actress and translator. From August 1923, she was a member of the Slovak National Theatre in Bratislava.
