= Gendarmstien =

Hiking trail in Denmark

- Length: 74 km (46 mi)
- Location: Als, Southern Jutland, Denmark
- Use: Hiking
- Difficulty: easy walk
- Waymark: blue pictogram on white
- Surface: natural paths
- Website: gendarmsti.dk

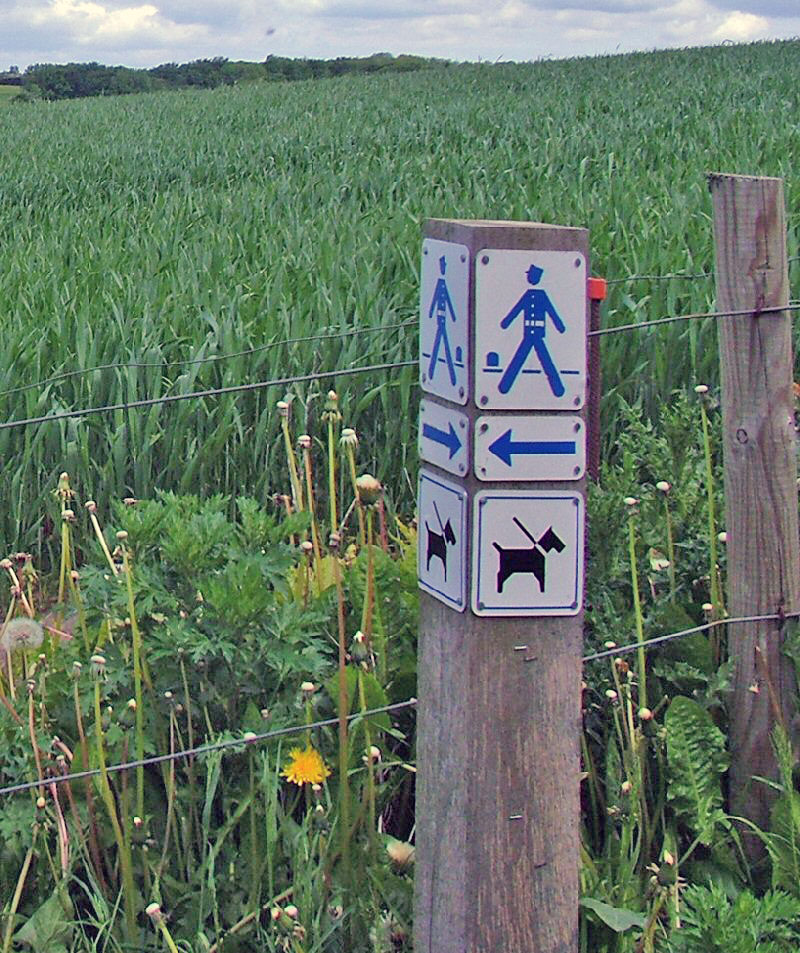
Signpost on Gendarmstien, 2005

Gendarmstien (English: Border Guard Trail) is a hiking trail going along the eastern part of the Denmark-Germany border. It is a part of the E6 trail.

Gendarmstiens etaper
