= Benedict Stattler =

German Jesuit theologian

Benedict Stattler (30 January 1728 – 21 August 1797) was a German Jesuit theologian, and an opponent of Immanuel Kant. He was a member of the German Catholic Enlightenment.

== Life ==
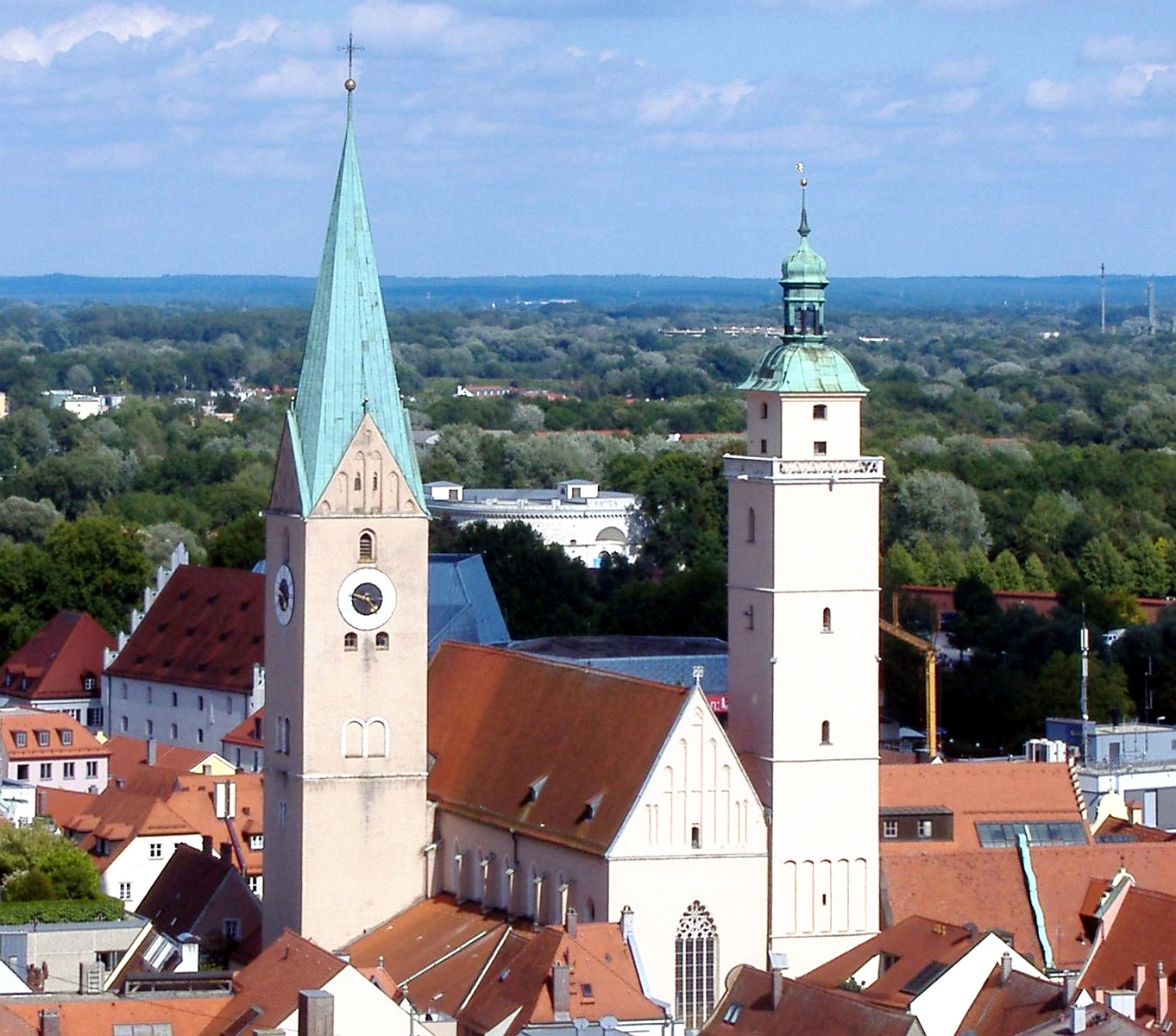
Moritzkirche, Ingolstadt

Benedict Stattler was born at Kötzting, Bavaria. He was educated by the Benedictines of Niederaltaich Abbey. He entered the Jesuit novitiate at Landsberg in 1745 and, after the usual studies, taught philosophy and theology in Solothurn (Switzerland), Innsbruck, and Ingolstadt. He was ordained in 1759. In Ingolstadt, he continued to occupy the chair of theology even after the suppression of the Society of Jesus in 1773. In 1774, he also assumed the duties of parish priest of the Church of St. Moritz.

In 1775, Stattler became vice-chancellor of the university but was forced out in 1781 due to anti-Jesuit sentiment. In 1783, when all former Jesuits were excluded from the office of teaching, he took charge of the parish of Kemnath, but soon exchanged this post for that of ecclesiastical adviser and member of the electoral committee on censures in Munich. After four years his health compelled him to resign this office, and he lived thereafter in retirement till his death. In his will, he established several charities that existed until confiscated in 1940.

== Works ==
Shortly after Adam Weishaupt had founded the secret society of the Illuminati, Stattler attacked them in an anonymous work (Das Geheimniß der Bosheit des Stifters des Illuminatismus in Baiern).

Kant's Critique of Pure Reason appeared in its first edition in 1781; in 1788 Stattler launched his Anti-Kant, and parried the attack which his book provoked in the literary world of Germany. His critique was inspired to the philosophy of Christian Wolff (philosopher). He defended the possibility to do metaphysics in the classical sense and to demonstrate the existence of God.

When the doctrines of the French revolutionists began to be echoed in his fatherland, he lost no time in pointing out to his compatriots the false ring which he detected in their boastful promises of liberty.

The bulk of his writings, however, is devoted to Catholic philosophy and theology. It was his avowed purpose to adapt the traditional teachings of the Schoolmen to the living needs of his time, "to plow anew the entire field of scholastic philosophy and theology and to fructify it with fresh seeds", as Bishop Sailer of Ratisbon, Stattler's great pupil, expressed it.

With this end in view, he wrote Philosophia methodo scientiæ propria explanata (Augsburg, 1769–72) and Demonstratio Evangelica (Augsburg, 1770). Yet he was attached to the rationalistic philosophy of Christian Wolff, religious toleration, and Febronianism.

His Ethica Christiana Communis (1782–1789) discussed the subject of work and wages.

His Demonstratio Catholica (Pappenheim, 1775) fell under the censure of the Roman authorities. And shortly before his death, his Loci Theologici (Weissenburg, 1775), Theologia Christiana Theoretica (Ingolstadt and Munich, 1776–79), and two other works were placed on the Index.

== Sources ==
- Biography by Johann Michael Sailer in Sämmtl. Werke (Sulzbach, 1841), xxxviii, 115 sq.
- Hugo von Hurter, Nomenclator, III, 236 sqq.
- Sommervogel, Bibliothèque, VII, 1498 sqq.;
- Karl Werner, Geschichte der katholischen Theologie seit dem Trienter Concil bis zur Gegenwart (Munich, 1866)
