= Sušice =

- Town
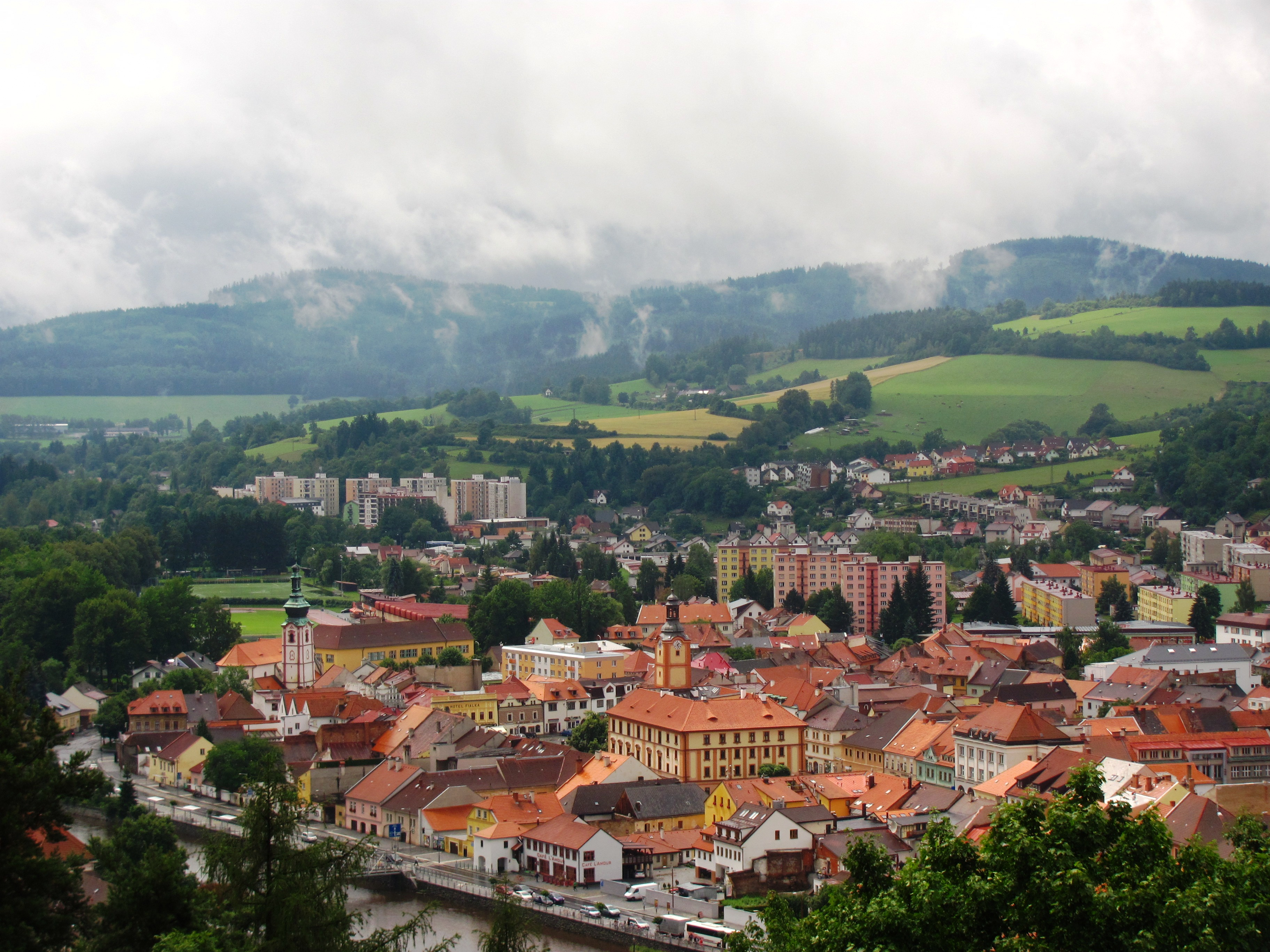
- General view

- Coat of arms

- Location in the Czech Republic
- Coordinates: 49°13′52″N 13°31′13″E
- Country: Czech Republic
- Region: Plzeň
- District: Klatovy
- First mentioned: 1233

Government
  - Mayor: Petr Mottl (ODS)

Area
  - Total: 45.65 km^{2} (17.63 sq mi)
- Elevation: 472 m (1,549 ft)

Population (2026-01-01)
  - Total: 10,689
  - Density: 234.2/km^{2} (606.4/sq mi)
- Time zone: UTC+1 (CET)
  - Summer (DST): UTC+2 (CEST)
- Postal code: 342 01
- Website: www.mestosusice.cz

Sušice (Czech pronunciation: [ˈsuʃɪtsɛ]; German: Schüttenhofen) is a town in Klatovy District in the Plzeň Region of the Czech Republic. It has about 11,000 inhabitants. The town is located on the Otava River in the Bohemian Forest Foothills.

Sušice became a town in 1260. Development was accelerated primarily by industrialisation in the 19th and 20th centuries, and the town became known for its match production. The historic town centre is well preserved and is protected as an urban monument zone. The main landmark of the town is the Renaissance town hall.

== Administrative division ==
Sušice consists of 17 municipal parts (in brackets population according to the 2021 census):

- Sušice I (597)
- Sušice II (7,893)
- Sušice III (1,290)
- Albrechtice (81)
- Červené Dvorce (123)
- Chmelná (151)
- Divišov (32)
- Dolní Staňkov (22)
- Humpolec (0)
- Milčice (18)
- Nuzerov (12)
- Páteček (17)
- Rok (41)
- Stráž (2)
- Volšovy (202)
- Vrabcov (21)
- Záluží (47)

== Etymology ==
The name Sušice is derived from the Czech verb sušit, i.e. 'dry'. At the time of its establishment, it was a place where gold panners dried gold sand after washing it.

== Geography ==
Sušice is located about 24 kilometres (15 mi) southeast of Klatovy and 56 km (35 mi) south of Plzeň. It lies in the Bohemian Forest Foothills. The highest point is the hill Sedlo at 902 m (2,959 ft) above sea level. The Otava River flows through the town. The Ostružná River flows into the Otava in the north of Sušice.

=== Climate ===
Average daily temperature in July is about 17.1 °C (62.8 °F), while January mean temperatures are typically −2.4 °C (27.7 °F). The annual average is 7.5 °C (45.5 °F).

Climate data for Sušice
Month	Jan	Feb	Mar	Apr	May	Jun	Jul	Aug	Sep	Oct	Nov	Dec	Year
Mean daily maximum °C (°F)	0.5 (32.9)	2.1 (35.8)	6.5 (43.7)	12.3 (54.1)	16.4 (61.5)	19.7 (67.5)	21.3 (70.3)	21.3 (70.3)	16.7 (62.1)	12.0 (53.6)	6.2 (43.2)	1.9 (35.4)	12.1 (53.8)
Daily mean °C (°F)	−2.4 (27.7)	−1.5 (29.3)	2.2 (36.0)	7.5 (45.5)	12.0 (53.6)	15.5 (59.9)	17.1 (62.8)	17.0 (62.6)	12.6 (54.7)	8.1 (46.6)	3.0 (37.4)	−0.8 (30.6)	7.5 (45.5)
Mean daily minimum °C (°F)	−5.2 (22.6)	−4.9 (23.2)	−1.8 (28.8)	2.4 (36.3)	7.2 (45.0)	10.9 (51.6)	12.6 (54.7)	12.5 (54.5)	8.6 (47.5)	4.6 (40.3)	0.1 (32.2)	−3.3 (26.1)	2.9 (37.2)
Average precipitation mm (inches)	68 (2.7)	56 (2.2)	73 (2.9)	68 (2.7)	101 (4.0)	113 (4.4)	118 (4.6)	106 (4.2)	79 (3.1)	65 (2.6)	64 (2.5)	69 (2.7)	980 (38.6)
Source: Climate-Data.org

== History ==
Sušice originated as a settlement in a gold-panning area near the Otava River. The first settlement was founded here probably around 790, however the first written mention of Sušice is from 1233. In the 12th century, the area was owned by the Bavarian Counts of Bogen. It was re-connected to Bohemia by King Ottokar II in the 13th century and after 1260 it became a royal fortified town.

During the Hussite Wars (1419–1434), Sušice was a Hussite town. The town's major economic growth occurred in the 16th century, when the town profited from the salt, grain and malt trade with neighbouring Bavaria. In the 17th and 18th centuries, Sušice suffered from wars, fires and the Counter-Reformation. The most devastating was the fire of 1707, which destroyed most of the town. In the 19th century, new prosperity came. The production of phosphorus matches started here and made Sušice famous all over the world. The leather industry also developed in the town, and at the end of the 19th century, the mining and processing of limestone was started.

Until 1918, Sušice – Schüttenhoffen was part of Austria-Hungary. The town was an administrative seat of the district of the same name.

=== Jewish community ===
The first written mention of Jews in Sušice is from 1562. The number of Jews in Sušice gradually increased and reached its peak in 1860, when 300 lived here. A pogrom occurred in 1866, then the population decreased and in 1930 only 112 Jews lived in Sušice. They had a reserved part of the town for living, which was accessible only from the town walls (today's Vodní, formerly Židovská (i.e. 'Jewish') street).

Three synagogues were located in Sušice. The first was a wooden prayer house, which burned down in 1707. A new synagogue was built on its site, which served until 1923, when it also burned down. A third synagogue was in operation from 1859, which served its purpose until World War II. After the war, it became the profperty of the town and was demolished in 1963.

The old Jewish cemetery was established in 1626, the last burial took place there in 1873. After its capacity was no longer sufficient, a new cemetery was founded in 1873, where the last burial took place in 1946.

== Demographics ==
Historical population

Year	Pop.	±%
1869	6,796	—
1880	7,671	+12.9%
1890	8,117	+5.8%
1900	8,566	+5.5%
1910	8,866	+3.5%

Year	Pop.	±%
1921	8,707	−1.8%
1930	8,715	+0.1%
1950	8,229	−5.6%
1961	8,937	+8.6%
1970	9,498	+6.3%

Year	Pop.	±%
1980	11,047	+16.3%
1991	11,308	+2.4%
2001	11,462	+1.4%
2011	11,037	−3.7%
2021	10,549	−4.4%

Source: Censuses

== Economy ==
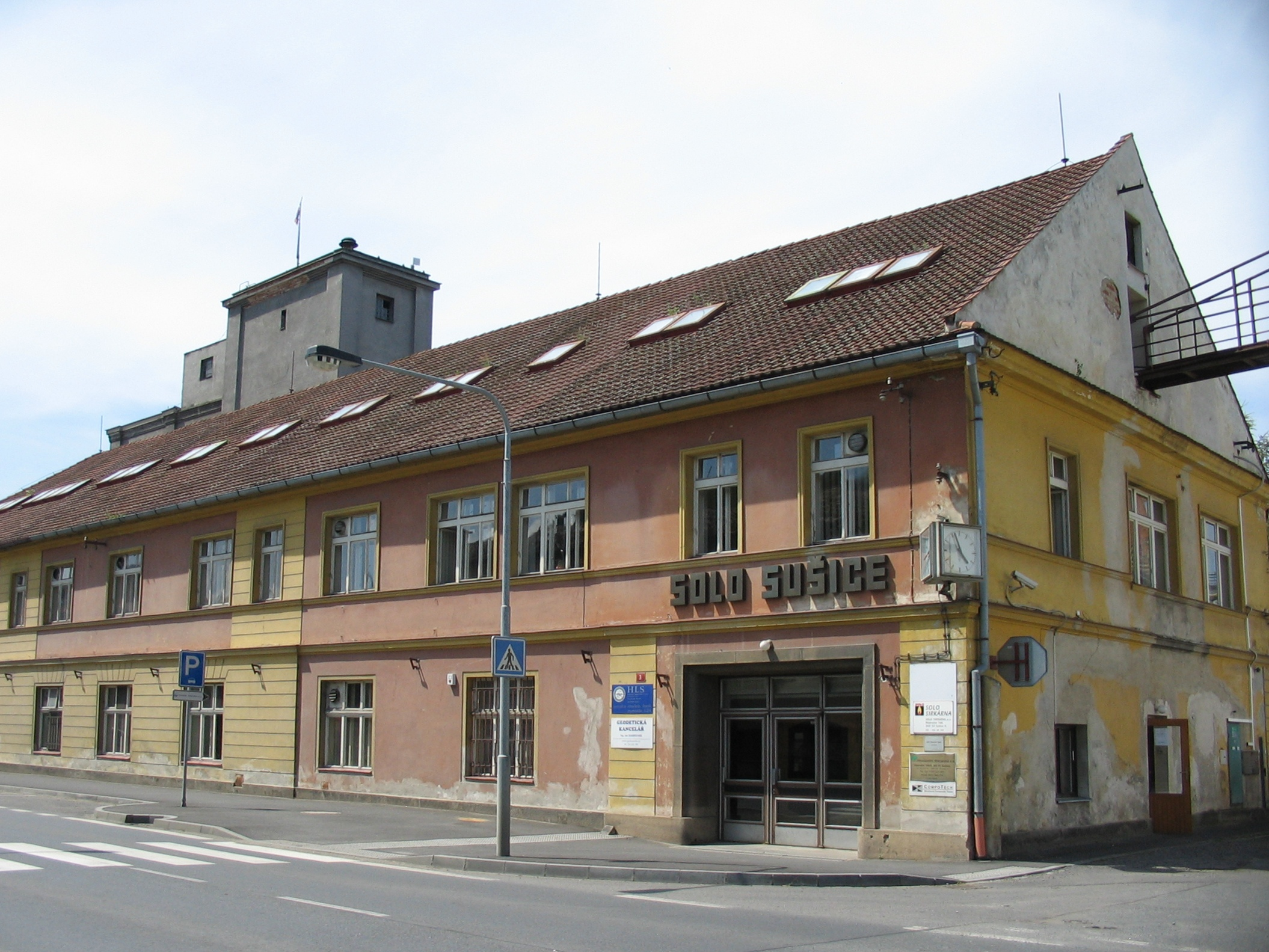
SOLO headquarters

Sušice was known for the production of matches, under the SOLO brand. The factory was founded by Vojtěch Scheinost in 1839, and production was financed by entrepreneur Bernard Fürth. The industry continued until 2008, when it ended due to financial problems. Production was then moved to India, and the enterprise was transformed into a trading company dealing in related goods (matches, lighters, etc.).

== Transport ==
Sušice is located on the regional railway line heading from Klatovy to Horažďovice.

== Sights ==
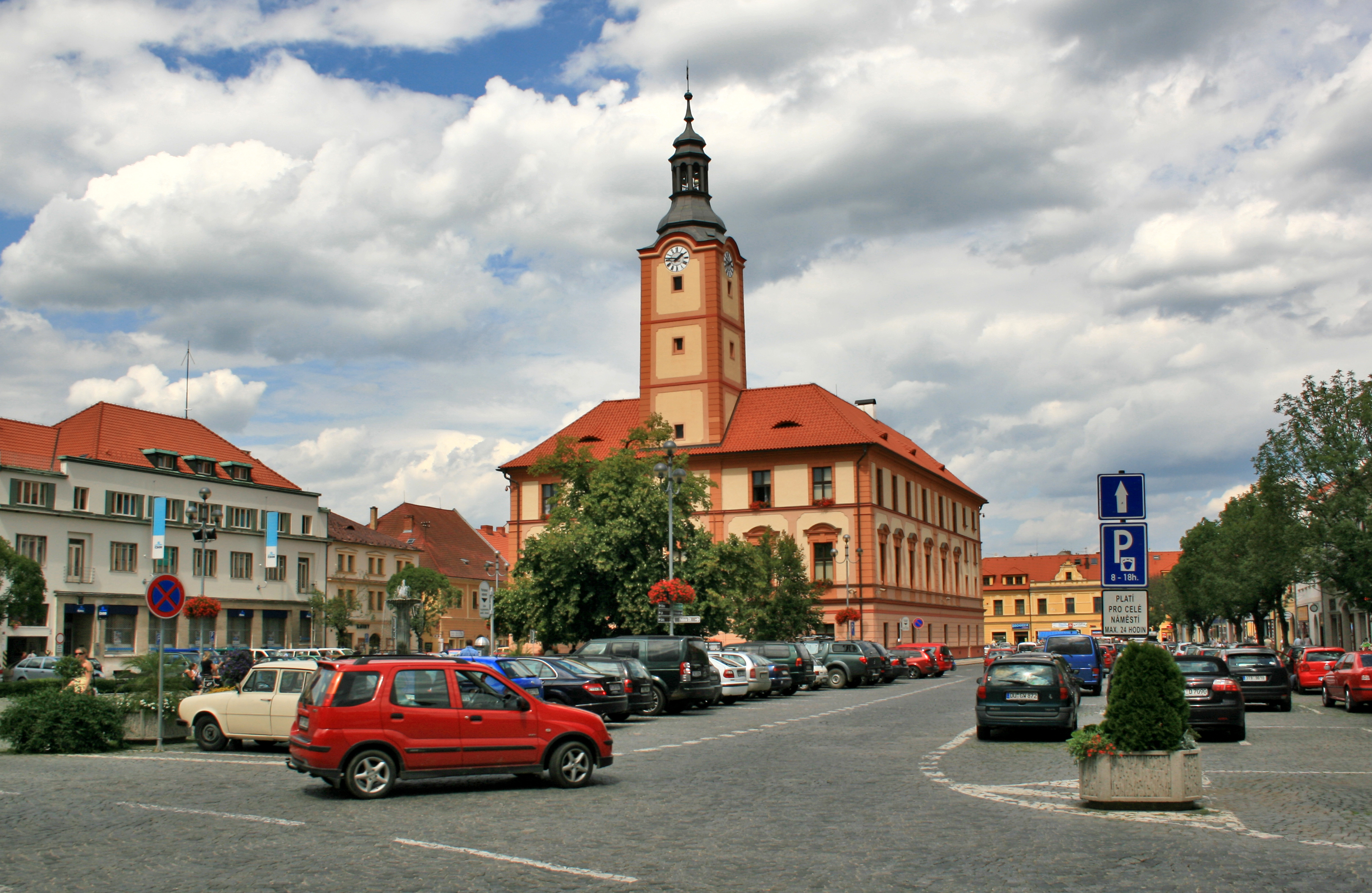
Town hall on the main town square

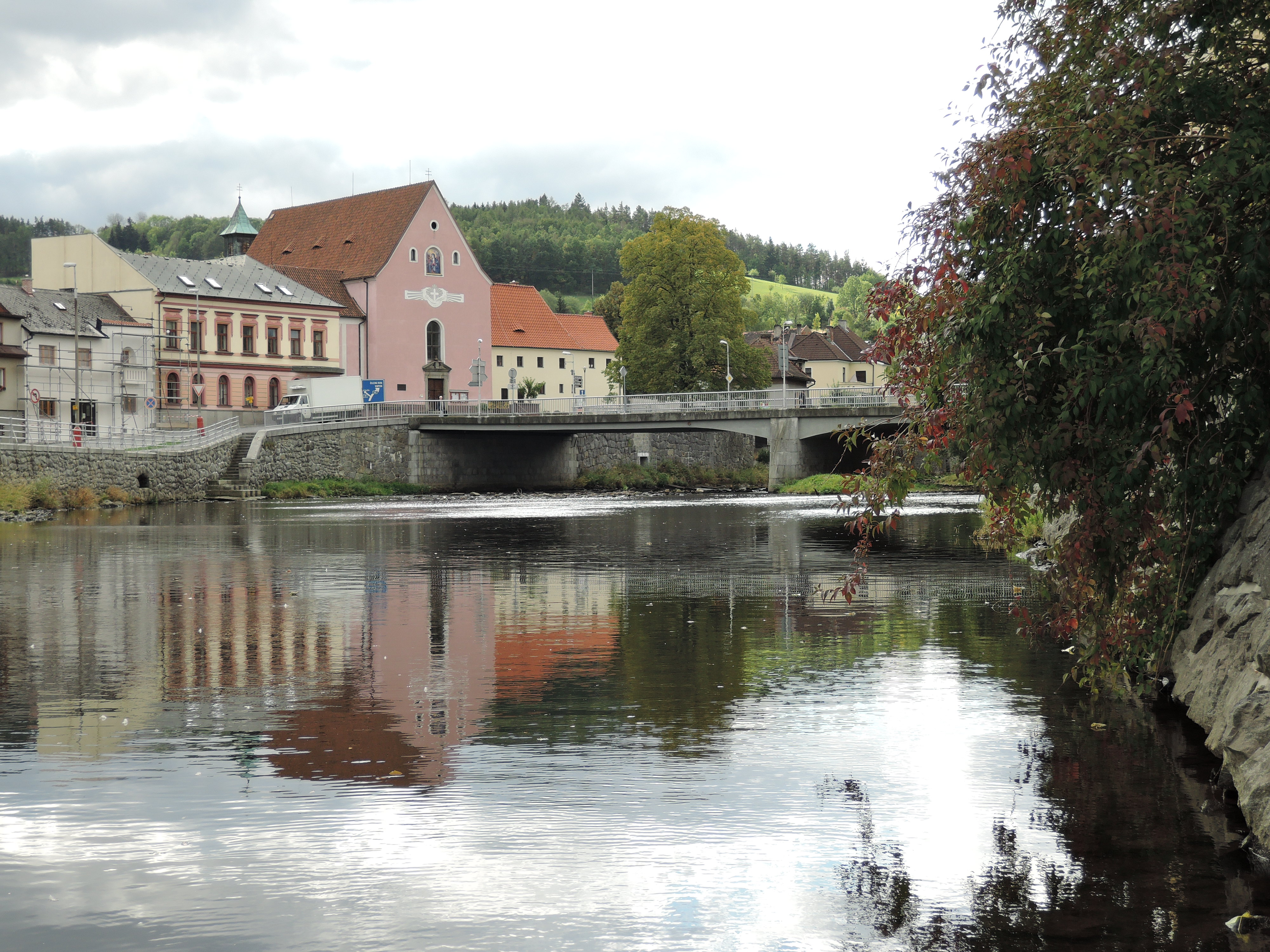
Otava River and the Capuchin monastery

The main landmark of the town square is the Renaissance town hall with a 31 metres (102 ft) high tower. The Bohemian Forest Museum is located in a Gothic house on the corner of the square. It focuses on the history of Sušice and the local production of matches. The museum also exhibits the largest match in the world, measuring 3.6 m (12 ft).

The Church of Saint Wenceslaus was built in the mid-14th century. Its southern wall was formed by the town wall. During the fire in 1707, the church was damaged and lost its two towers. It was reconstructed in the Baroque style and a new small tower was built. In 1884–1885, pseudo-Gothic modifications were made.

The Capuchin monastery with the Church of Saint Felix of Cantalice was founded by Emperor Ferdinand III. The church was built in 1651–1655 and the monastery building was constructed in 1665–1686. It used to be an important pilgrimage site. With the exception of the years 1950–1992, the monastery still serves the Capuchins.

The Church of the Assumption of the Virgin Mary is probably part of a larger unfinished Gothic church from the 14th century. The cemetery church was rebuilt to its current form after the fire in 1591.

The Chapel of the Guardian Angel on Stráž hill on the outskirts of Sušice is a significant landmark of the town. It was built in the early Baroque style in 1682–1683. It is a pilgrimage site and the way to it is lined with the Stations of the Cross.

The Jewish community is commemorated by two Jewish cemeteries. The Old Cemetery is one of the oldest Jewish cemeteries in Bohemia. The oldest preserved tombstone dates from 1708.

Svatobor is a hill with an altitude of 845 m (2,772 ft), known for the eponymous observation tower. The hill was a sacred place for the original Slavic tribes and a burial ground was discovered at its foot. The stone observation tower was built in 1934, after the original tower from 1900 burned down. It is 31.6 m (104 ft) high.

== Notable people ==
- Wenzel Benno Seidl (1773–1842), Czech-Austrian botanist
- Maximilian Pirner (1854–1924), painter
- Karl Koller (1857–1944), Austrian ophthalmologist
- Josefa Humpalová–Zeman (1870–1906), Czech-American journalist, newspaper founder and feminist
- František Salzer (1902–1974), theatre director and actor
- Břetislav Pojar (1923–2012), puppeteer, animator and film director
- Petr Vaníček (born 1935), Czech-Canadian geodesist
- Marie Fikáčková (1936–1961), serial killer
- Jiří Maštálka (born 1956), politician
- Jaromír Tauchen (born 1981), lawyer and historian
- Tomáš Pekhart (born 1989), footballer

== Twin towns – sister cities ==
Sušice is a member of the Douzelage, a town twinning association of towns across the European Union. This active town twinning began in 1991, and there are now regular events resulting from this membership, such as festivals, or a produce market presenting goods from the countries of the twin towns. Its members are:

- Agros, Cyprus
- Altea, Spain
- Asikkala, Finland
- Bad Kötzting, Germany
- Bellagio, Italy
- (Republic of Ireland) Bundoran, Ireland
- Chojna, Poland
- Granville, France
- Holstebro, Denmark
- Houffalize, Belgium
- Judenburg, Austria
- Kőszeg, Hungary
- Marsaskala, Malta
- Meerssen, Netherlands
- Niederanven, Luxembourg
- Oxelösund, Sweden
- Preveza, Greece
- Rokiškis, Lithuania
- Rovinj, Croatia
- Sesimbra, Portugal
- Sherborne, England, United Kingdom
- Sigulda, Latvia
- Siret, Romania
- Škofja Loka, Slovenia
- Tryavna, Bulgaria
- Türi, Estonia
- Zvolen, Slovakia

Sušice also has two other twin towns:

- Uetendorf, Switzerland
- Wenzenbach, Germany

== Gallery ==
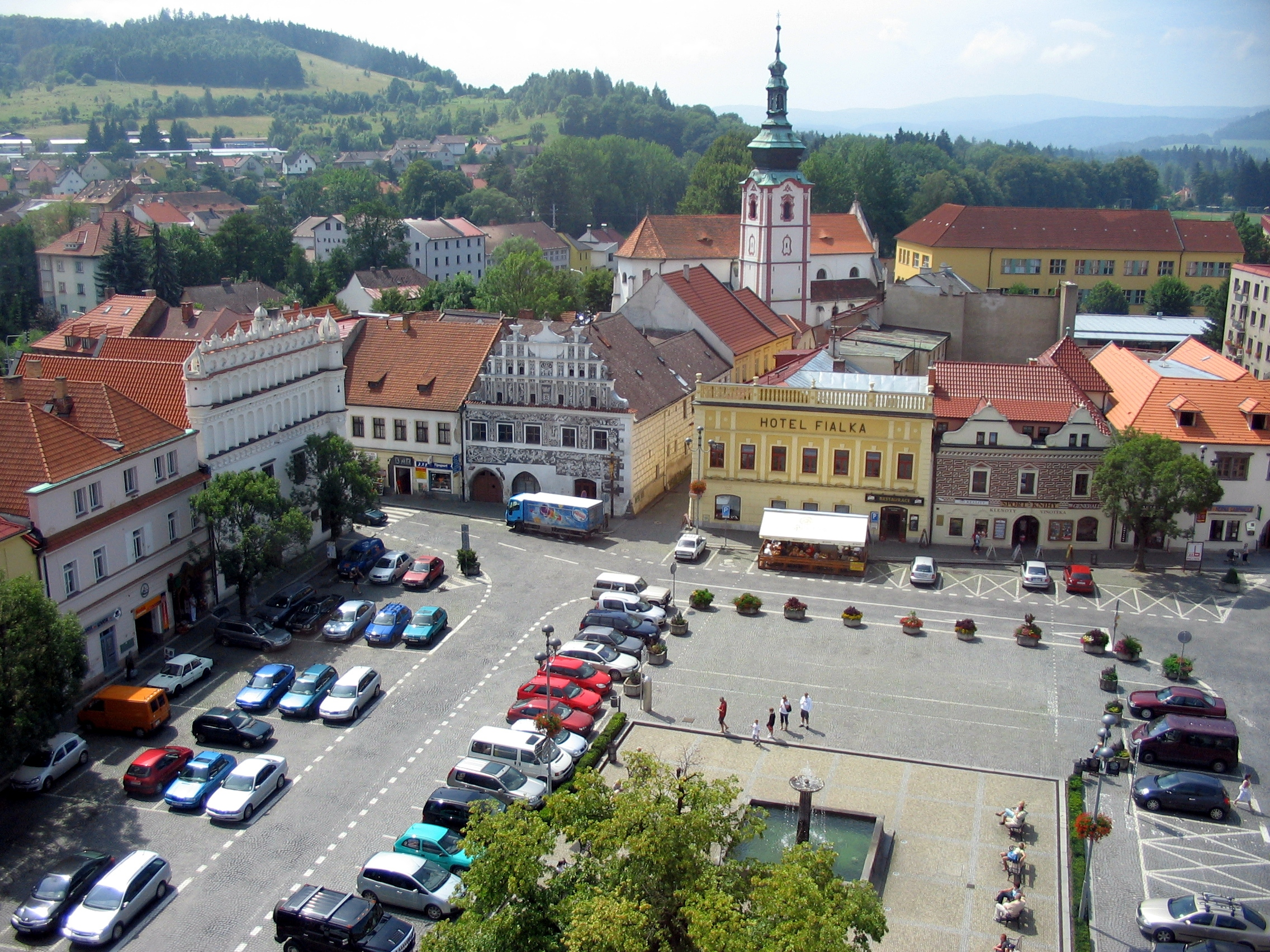
The southern end of the main town square

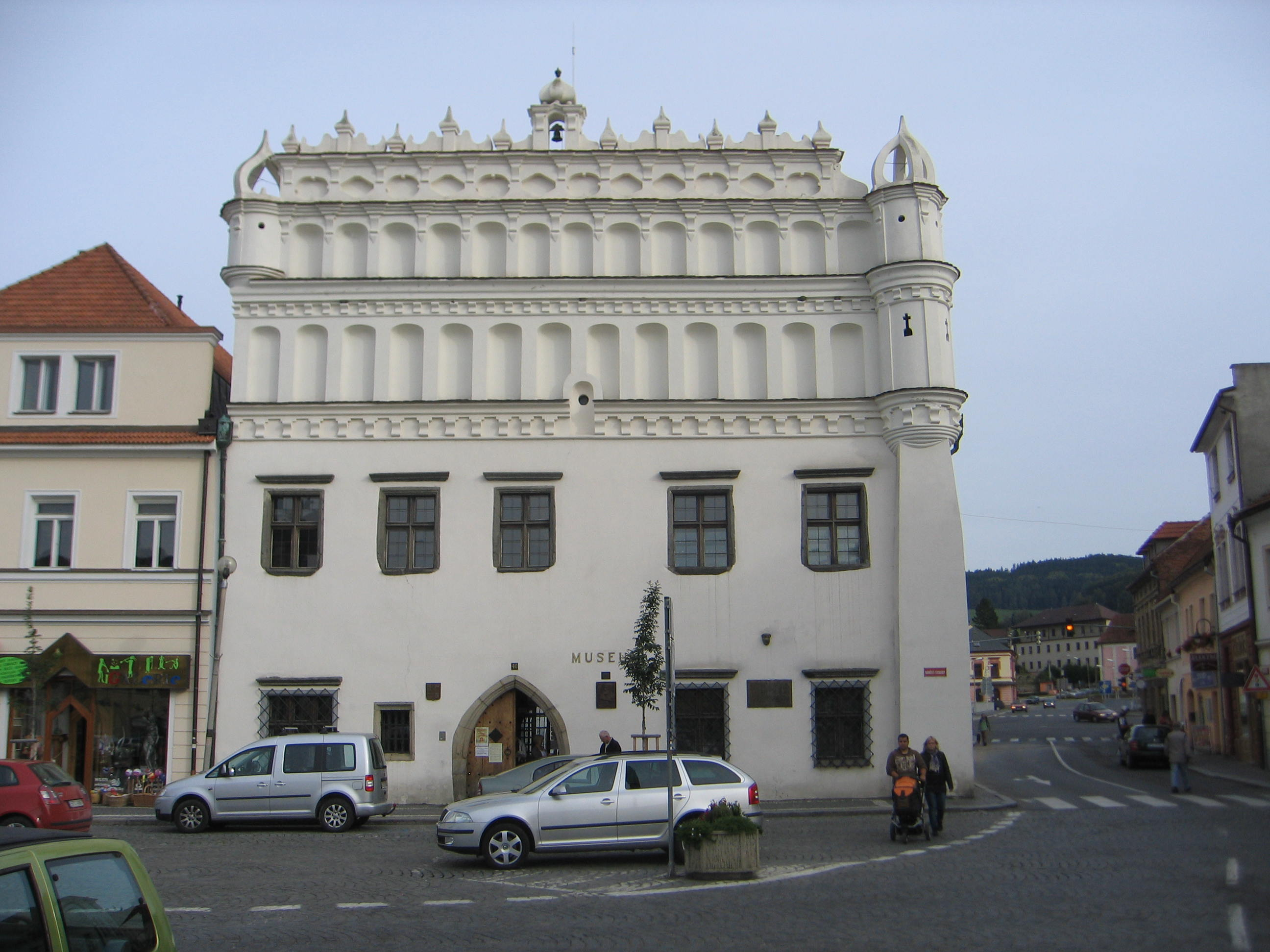
The Bohemian Forest Museum

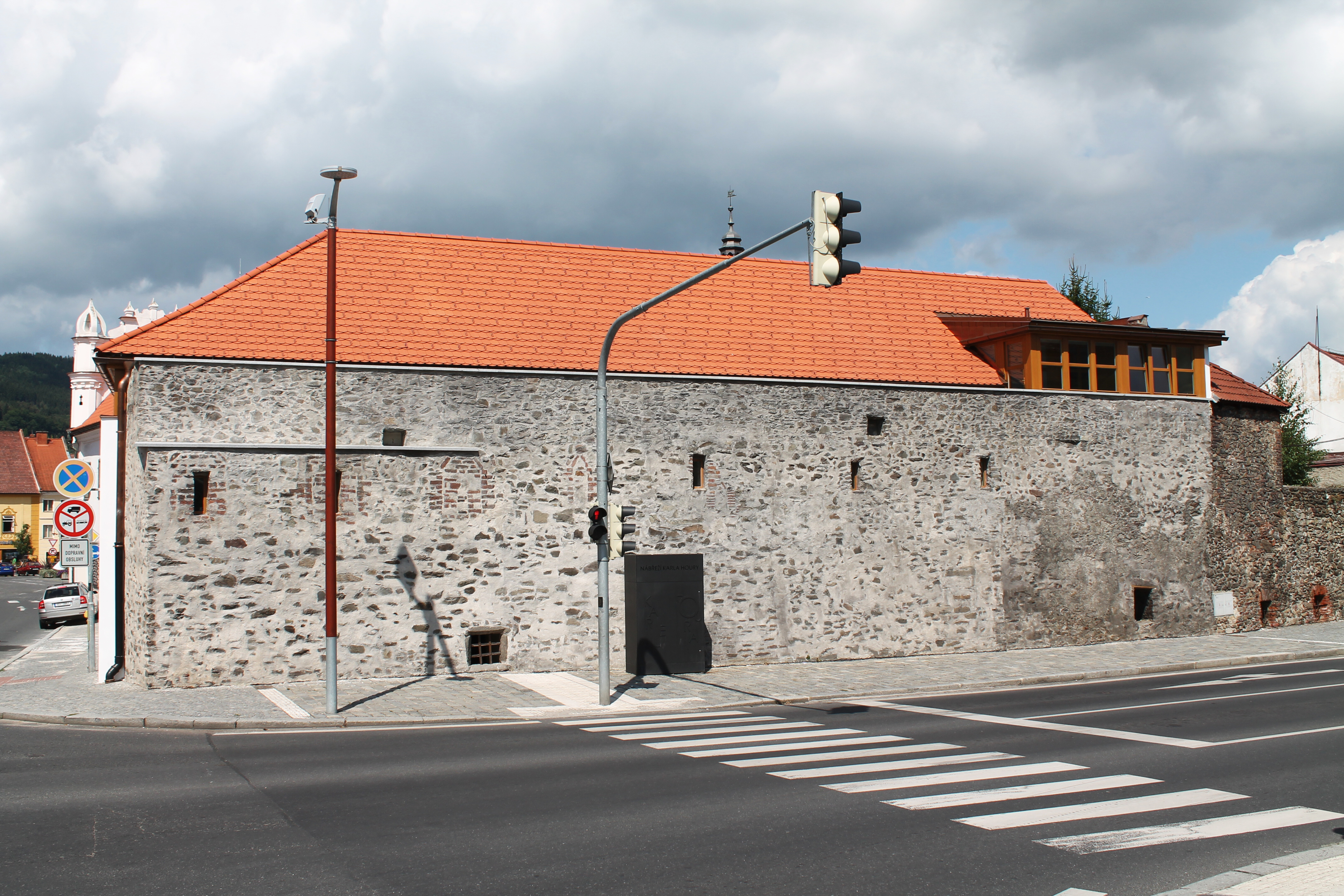
Fragment of the town walls

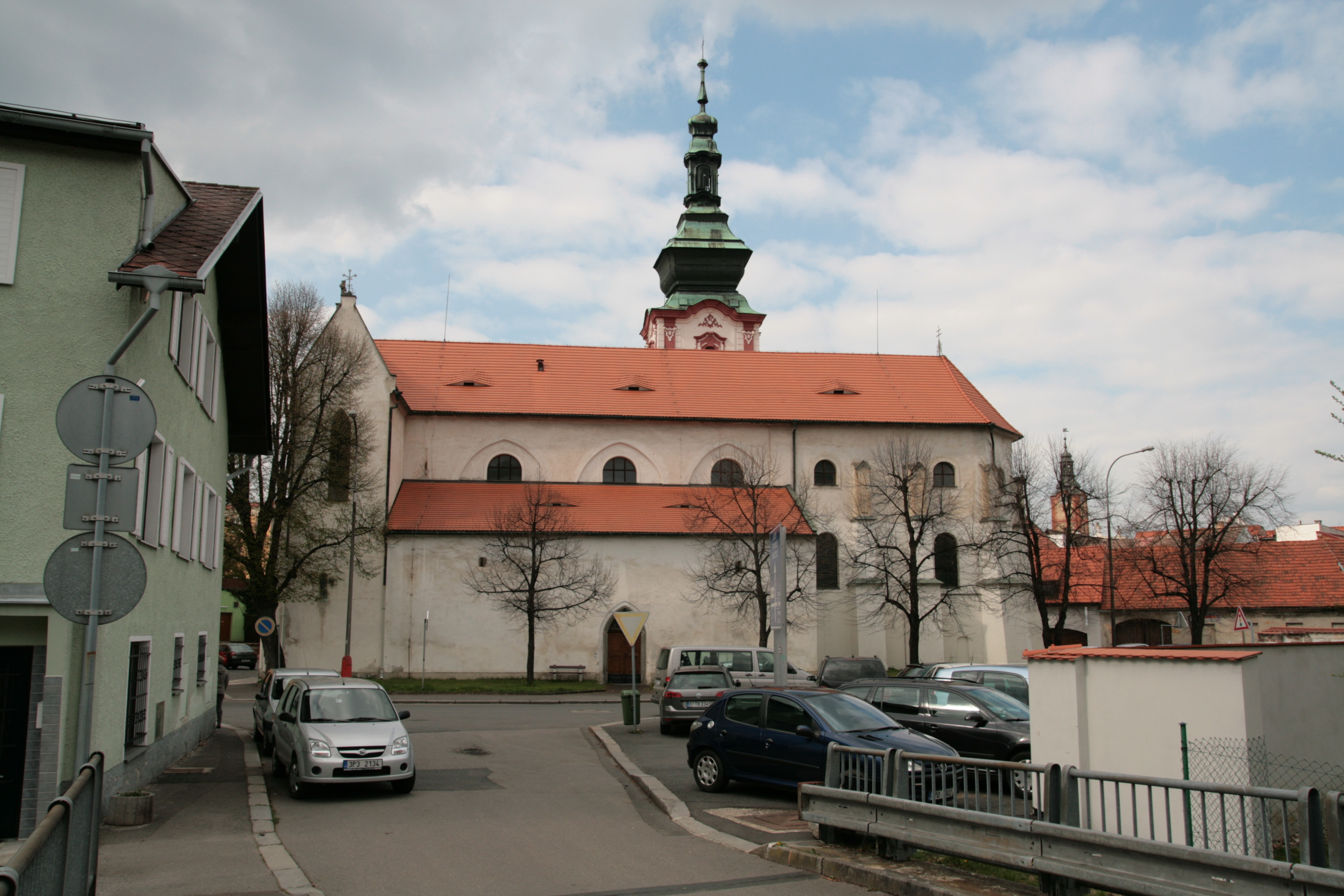
Church of Saint Wenceslaus

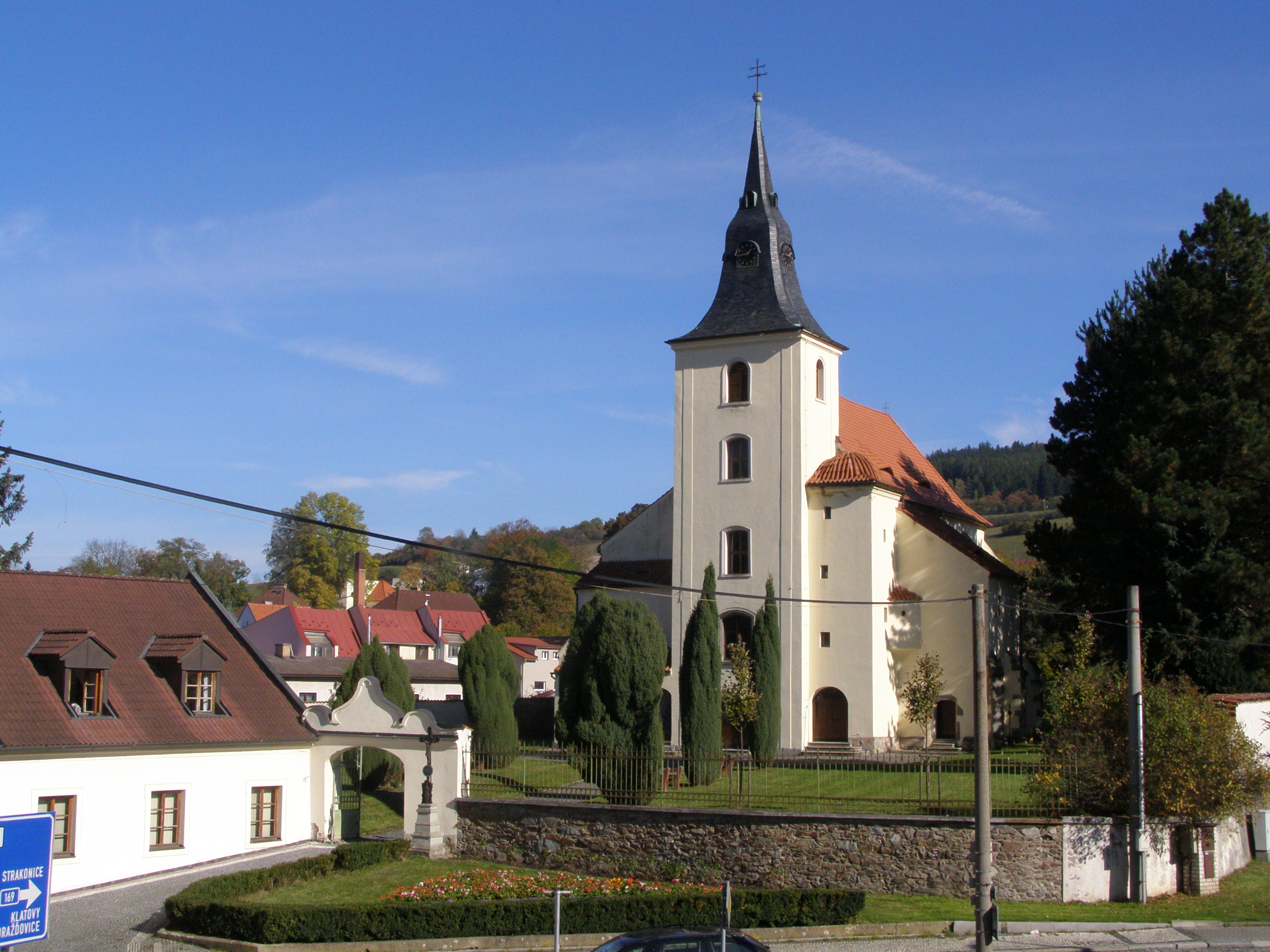
Church of the Assumption of the Virgin Mary

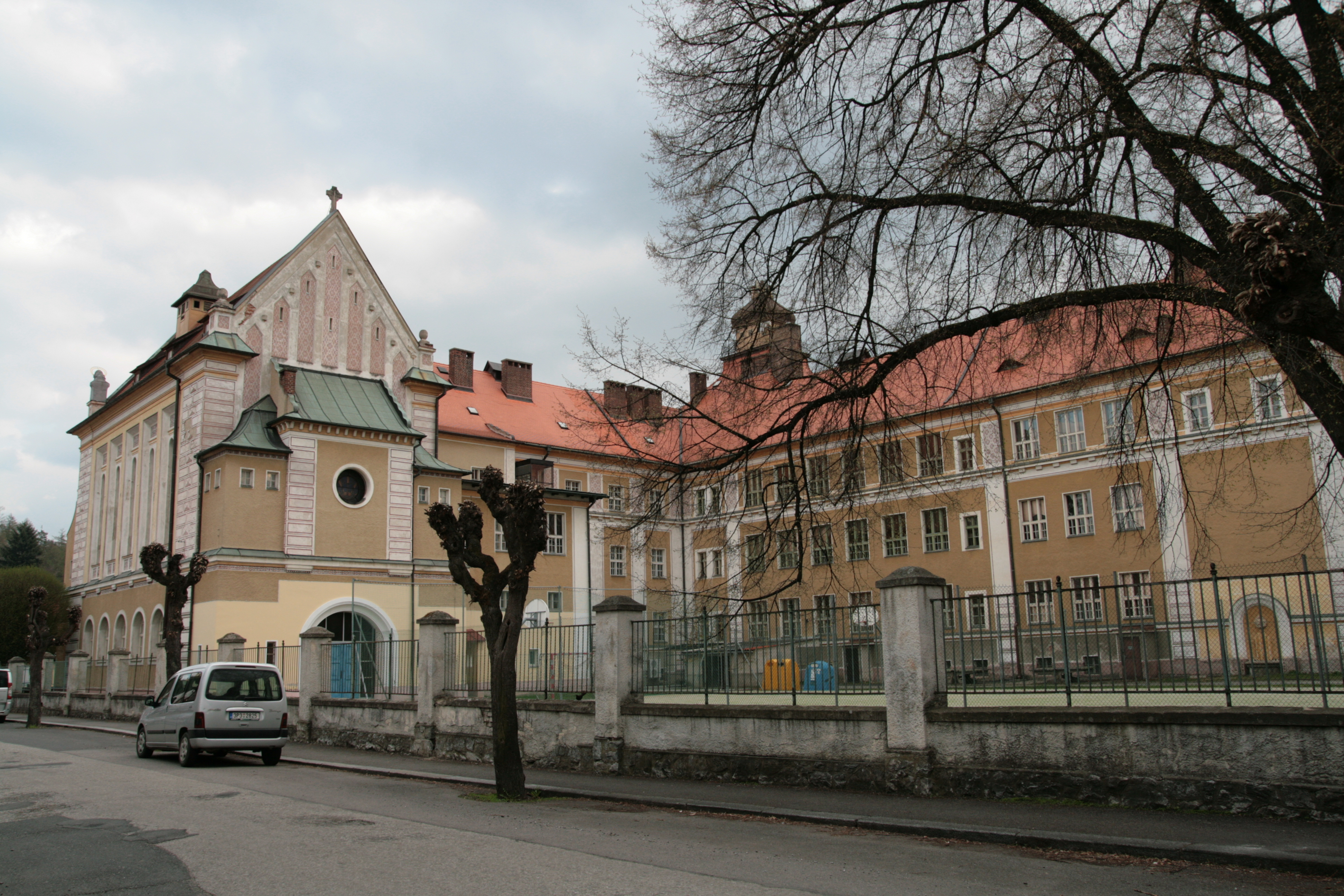
Gymnasium
