= Marie Fikáčková =

Czech nurse and serial killer (1936–1961)

- Born: Marie Schmidl; 9 September 1936; Sušice, Czechoslovakia
- Died: 13 April 1961 (aged 24); Pankrác Prison, Prague, Czechoslovakia
- Cause of death: Execution by hanging
- Status: Executed
- Conviction: Murder
- Penalty: Death

Details
- Victims: 2–10+
- Span of crimes: 1957–1960
- Country: Czechoslovakia

Marie Fikáčková (9 September 1936 – 13 April 1961) was a Czech suspected serial killer, convicted for the killing of two newborn babies in Sušice in 1960. A neonatal nurse, Fikáčková claimed to have killed at least ten newborns between 1957 and 1960, and was executed by hanging in 1961.

== Early life ==
Marie Fikáčková (née Schmidl) was born on 9 September 1936 in Sušice, Czechoslovakia, into a Sudeten German family. She was raised in a dysfunctional family, and her marriage to a Czech man failed. In 1955, Fikáčková graduated from the medical school in Klatovy, and in 1957 she began working as a nurse in the obstetrics department of the hospital in Sušice.

== Murders ==
On 23 February 1960, two newborn babies died at the obstetric department while Fikáčková was working. Both newborns were females, aged 20 hours and 5 weeks, and the following autopsy found the babies had died an unnatural violent death. Four days later, on 27 February, Fikáčková was arrested directly in the workplace, and during the subsequent interrogation, she confessed to killing the children. She admitted that both had their skull cracked, and broke one of their hands, and acknowledged she also used violence against a dozen other newborns, but those – in her words – survived the attack. During the investigation, Fikáčková confessed to killing at least ten newborn babies at Sušice hospital since she began working there in 1957.

The motive for the murders was never officially confirmed, but based on statements made by Fikáčková, claimed she developed temporary feelings of paedophobia (fear of children) during her menstruation periods. While invoking crying in the newborn children as part of her work, the crying would cause her to enter a rage where she beat the children severely. Fikáčková also claimed the murders were committed as revenge on Czech children because a Czech man had insulted her about her German heritage. The court doctors found Fikáčková to be sane, but prone to depression, hysteria and uncontrollable outbursts of anger. At her trial, Fikáčková was charged and convicted for only the two murders on 23 February 1960, as it was not possible to prove the older killings she claimed to have committed.

== Death ==
The attacks of aggression were caused by psychopathy. Fikáčková was convicted of murder, sentenced to death, and subsequently executed by hanging at Pankrác Prison in Prague on 13 April 1961.

== See also ==
- List of serial killers by country
