= Jaromír Tauchen =

Czech historian and lawyer

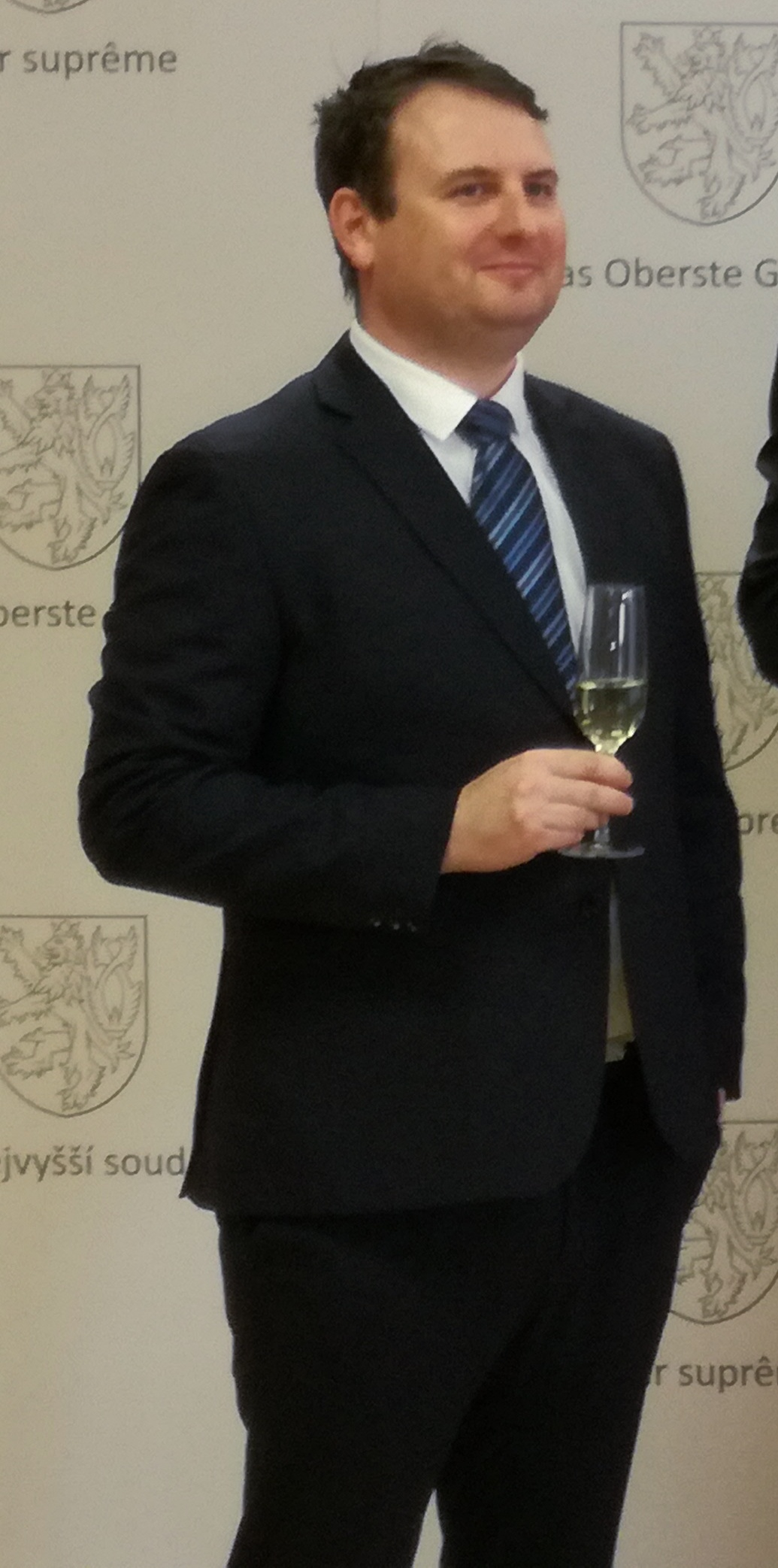
Jaromír Tauchen (2019)

Jaromír Tauchen (born 23 July 1981) is a Czech lawyer, law-historian, certified judiciary interpreter and translator (German/Czech) and lecturer at the Faculty of Law, Masaryk University, Brno. His researches are mainly aimed at German legal history, especially the era of the Third Reich in Germany, in the Protectorate Bohemia and Moravia and history of Germans in the Czech lands.

== Life and academic career ==
Jaromír Tauchen was born on 23 July 1981 in Sušice. He has worked at the Department of History of State and Law, Faculty of Law of Masaryk University in Brno. Having taken part in a number of international school tours and international research projects, Tauchen has studied at a couple of German and Austrian Universities, e.g. Innsbruck, Dresden, Frankfurt and Vienna. He has published his articles especially in the Journal on European History of Law. Further, he has been a co-author of a couple of monographs published in Germany. Mr. Jaromir Tauchen is certified judiciary interpreter and translator (German/Czech) and a member of the Deutsch-Tschechische Juristenvereinigung e.V., and The European Society for History of Law. He is a member of the Editorial board of the Journal on European History of Law and member of the international Scientific board of the Beiträge zur Rechtsgeschichte Österreichs. He is an editor of the Encyclopedia of Czech Legal History and a member of its scientific board.

== Partial bibliography ==
- Schelle, Karel – Tauchen, Jaromír (eds.). Encyklopedie českých právních dějin, I. svazek A – Č (Encyclopedia of Czech Legal History, Volume I. A - Č.). Plzeň, Aleš Čeněk, 2015, 972 pp., ISBN 978-80-7380-562-3
- Adamová, Karolina – Schelle, Karel – Lojek, Antonín - Tauchen, Jaromír. Velké dějiny zemí Koruny české. Tematická řada. Stát. (The Great History of the Czech Lands. Thematic Series. The State) Praha, Paseka, 2015. 652 pp., ISBN 978-80-7432-652-3
- Schelle, Karel – Tauchen, Jaromír. Vývoj konstitucionalismu v českých zemích (The Development of Constitutionalism in the Czech Lands) (2 Volume). Praha, Linde a.s., 2013, 2800 pp., ISBN 978-80-7201-927-4
- Vojáček, Ladislav – Schelle, Karel – Tauchen, Jaromír a kol. Vývoj soukromého práva na území českých zemí (The Development of Private Law in the Territory of the Czech Republic)(2 Volume). Brno: Masarykova univerzita, 2012, 616 pp. and 411 pp. ISBN 978-80-210-6006-7
- Vojáček, Ladislav – Schelle, Karel – Tauchen, Jaromír (eds.). Nástin právních dějin. (Czech Legal History) Brno, Masarykova univerzita, 2011, 322 pp., ISBN 978-80-210-5462-2
- Vojáček, Ladislav – Schelle, Karel – Tauchen, Jaromír (eds.). An Introduction to History of Czech Private Law. Brno, Masarykova univerzita, 2011, 182 pp.,ISBN 978-80-210-5592-6
- Schelle, Karel – Tauchen, Jaromír (eds.). Protektorát Čechy a Morava – jedna z nejtragičtějších kapitol českých novodobých dějin (vybrané problémy). (The Protectorate Bohemia and Moravia - One of the Tragically Chapter of the Czech Modern History". Brno, The European Society for History of Law, 2010, 139 pp., ISBN 978-80-904522-0-6
- Tauchen, Jaromír. Vývoj trestního soudnictví v Německu v letech 1933 - 1945 (History of Criminal Justice in Germany 1933–1945) Brno, The European Society for History of Law, 2010, 186 pp., ISBN 978-80-904522-2-0
- Schelle, Karel – Tauchen, Jaromír. Grundriss der Tschechoslowakischen Rechtsgeschichte (Czech Legal History). München, Verlag Dr. Hut, 2009, 196 pp., ISBN 978-3-89963-935-3
- Schelle, Karel – Tauchen, Jaromír. Recht und Verwaltung im Protektorat Böhmen und Mähren (Law and Public Administration in Protectorate Bohemia and Moravia). München, Verlag Dr. Hut, 2009, 124 pp., ISBN 978-3-89963-935-3
- Vojáček, Ladislav – Schelle, Karel – Tauchen, Jaromír – Veselá, Renata. Geschichte von Integrationskonzeptionen in Europa bis 1945 (History of European Integration until 1945). München, Verlag Dr. Hut, 2009. 115 pp., ISBN 978-3-86853-065-0

== See also ==
- Jaromír Tauchen https://muni.academia.edu/Jarom%C3%ADrTauchen
- Fulltexte of selected articles on academia.edu
