= Drachselsried =

- Municipality
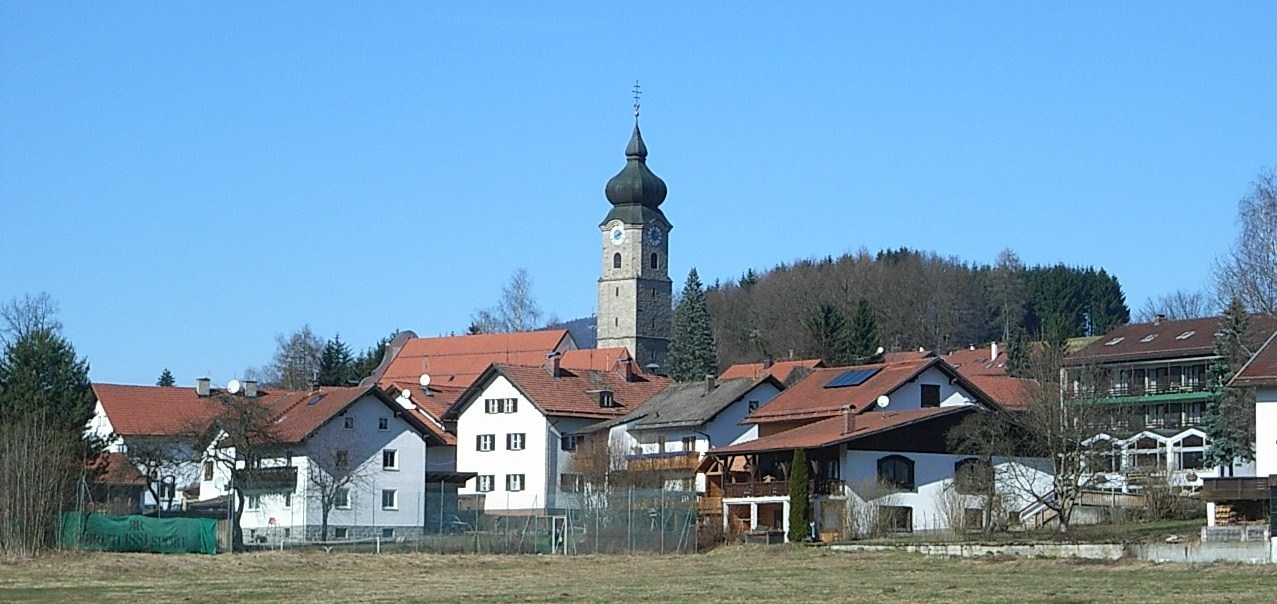
- Drachselsried

- Coat of arms

- Location of Drachselsried within Regen district
- Interactive map of Drachselsried
- Location within Germany Location within Bavaria
- Coordinates: 49°6′N 13°1′E
- Country: Germany
- State: Bavaria
- Admin. region: Niederbayern
- District: Regen

Government
  - Mayor (2020–26): Johannes Vogl (CSU)

Area
  - Total: 41.73 km^{2} (16.11 sq mi)
- Elevation: 435–1,284 m (1,427–4,213 ft)

Population (2025-12-31)
  - Total: 2,387
  - Density: 57.20/km^{2} (148.2/sq mi)
- Time zone: UTC+01:00 (CET)
  - Summer (DST): UTC+02:00 (CEST)
- Postal codes: 94256
- Dialling codes: 09945
- Vehicle registration: REG
- Website: www.drachselsried.de

Drachselsried is a municipality in the district of Regen, in Bavaria, Germany. Drachselsried is in the Zeller Valley (German: Zellertal), and is part of the Glass Road (Glasstrasse) The area is part of the Bavarian Forest National Park. The village is a small, highly organised, friendly place to live. Bayern Eins, the German radio station, gave some history details of the village, which was first noted in 1184. The village continues to grow with the addition in 2017 of a retirement home with private apartments, close to the village centre. A number of new homes have been built on land available for purchase from the local council.
