= Zeller Valley =

Valley in Germany

The Zeller Valley (German: Zellertal) is a valley in the Bavarian Forest in southern Germany.

The Zeller Valley extends about 30 km from north to south and about 12 km from east to west. The valley runs from the village of Bodenmais to Bad Kötzting. The communities of Drachselsried and Arnbruck lie within the Zeller Valley. Its highest mountain is the Kaitersberg.
