= Heugstatt =

Mountain in Germany

Coordinates: 49°08′N 13°04′E

Highest point
- Elevation: 1,262 m (4,140 ft)

Geography
- Location: Bavaria, Germany

Heugstatt is a mountain of Bavaria, Germany.
