= Mühlriegel =

Mountain in Germany

Coordinates: 49°09′N 13°01′E

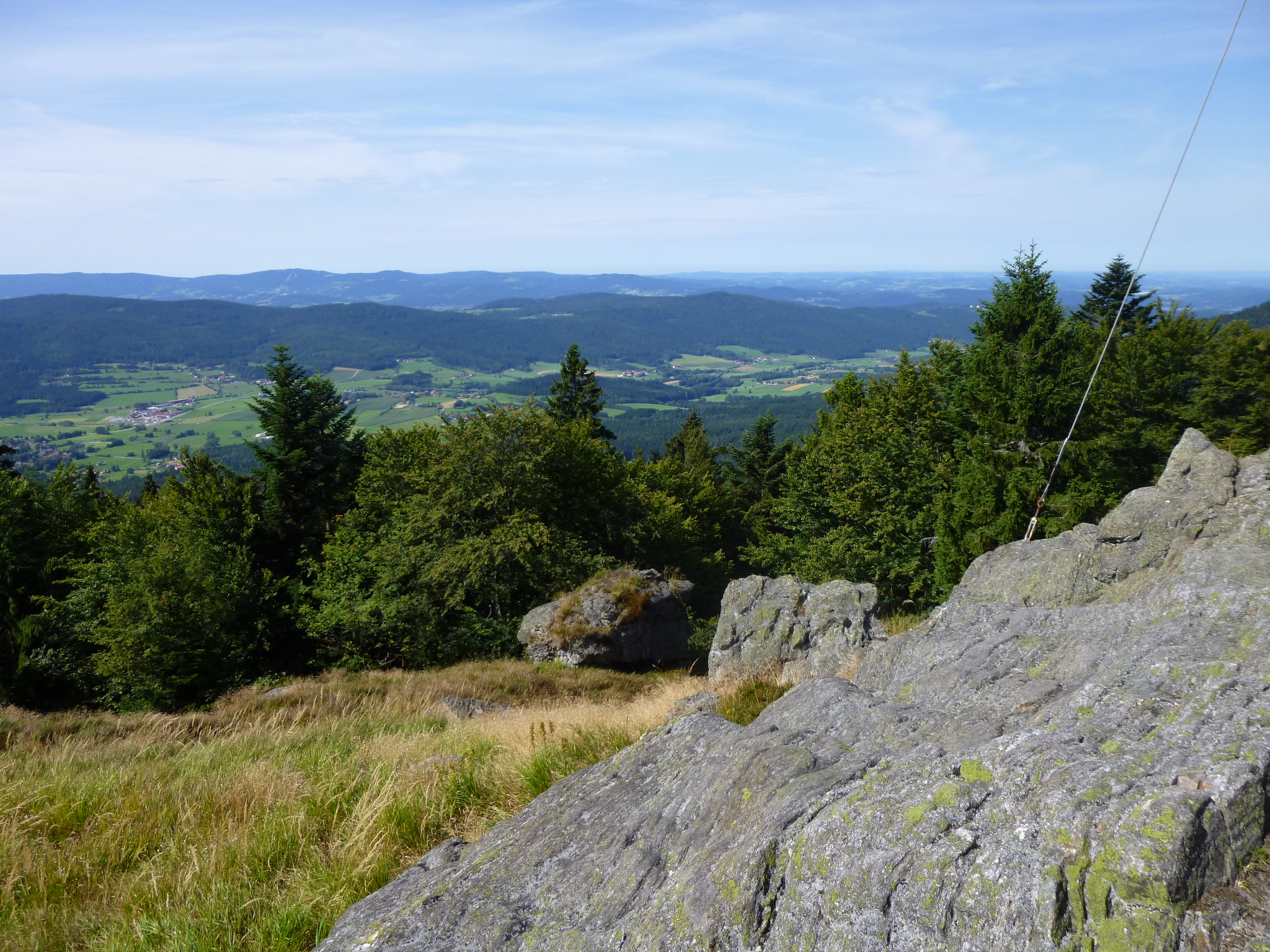
- A View from the 1080 m high mill bar to the south;The Mountain peaks on the hiking route from Kaitersberg to the Großer Arber summit.

Highest point
- Elevation: 1,080 m (3,540 ft)

Geography
- Location: Bavaria, Germany

Mühlriegel is a mountain in Bavaria, Germany.
