= Øhavsstien =

Hiking trail in Denmark

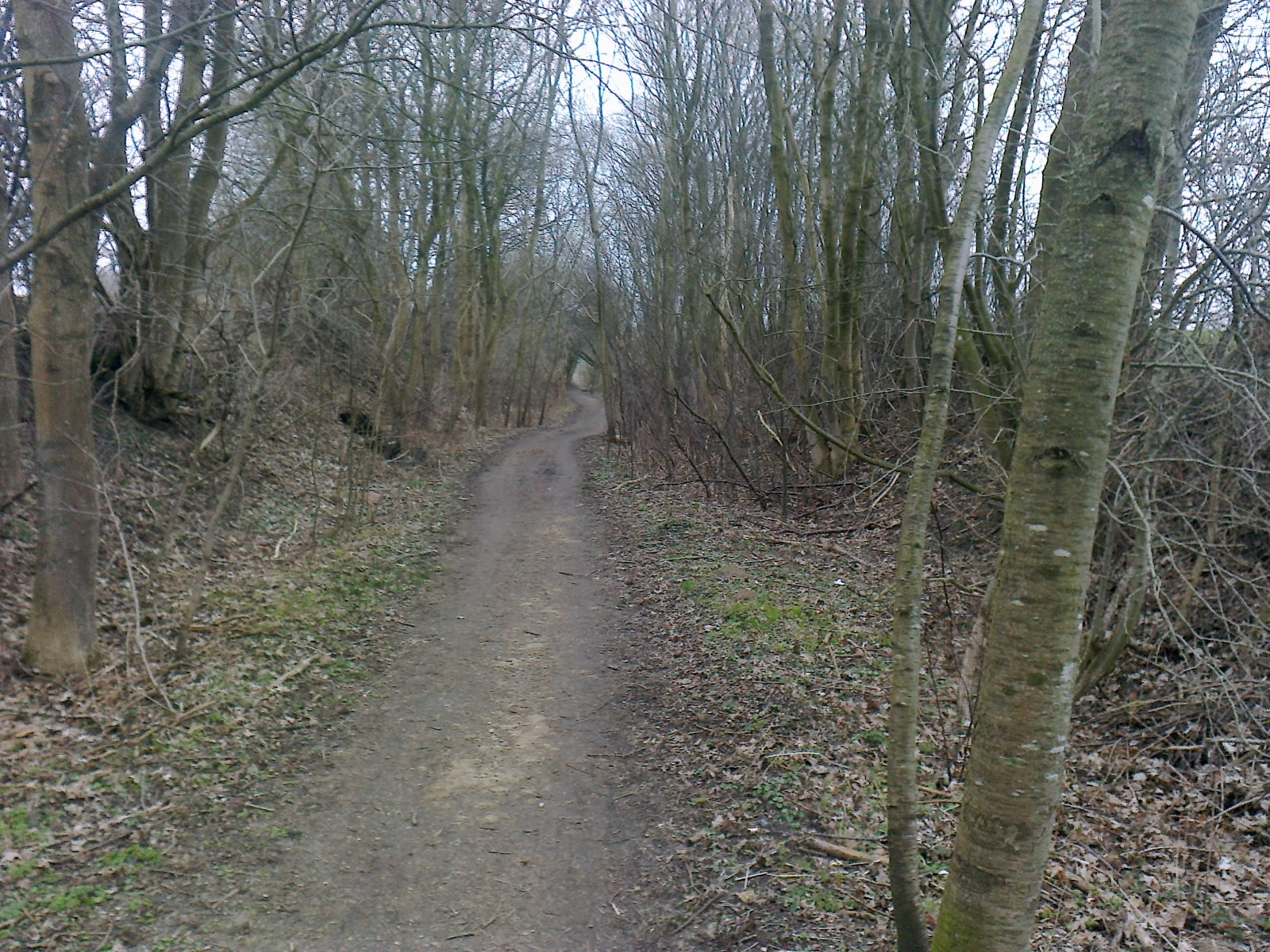
- Length: 220 km (140 mi)
- Location: Southern Funen, Denmark; Tåsinge, Langeland, Ærø
- Established: 2007
- Use: Hiking
- Difficulty: easy walk
- Waymark: white pictogram on blue
- Hazards: Lily of the valley
- Surface: natural paths
- Website: detsydfynskeoehav.dk

Øhavsstien (English: Archipelago Trail) is one of the longest hiking trails in Denmark. The trail goes through the South Funen Archipelago, along southern regions of Funen, as well as the islands of Tåsinge, Langeland and Ærø. It is exclusively a hiking trail, and bikes and horses are not allowed.

== Route ==
The route is divided into seven legs:

1. Faldsled - Faaborg - Fjællebroen (39 km)
2. Fjællebroen - Egebjerg Bakker - Svendborg (30 km)
3. Svendborg - Broholm - Lundeborg (30 km)
4. Svendborg - Tåsinge - Rudkøbing (20 km)
5. Lohals - Tranekær - Stengade Strand (29 km)
6. Stengade Strand - Rudkøbing - Henninge Nor (26 km)
7. Marstal - Ærøskøbing - Søby (36 km)
