= Kaitersberg =

Mountain in Germany

Coordinates: 49°10′00″N 12°58′24″E

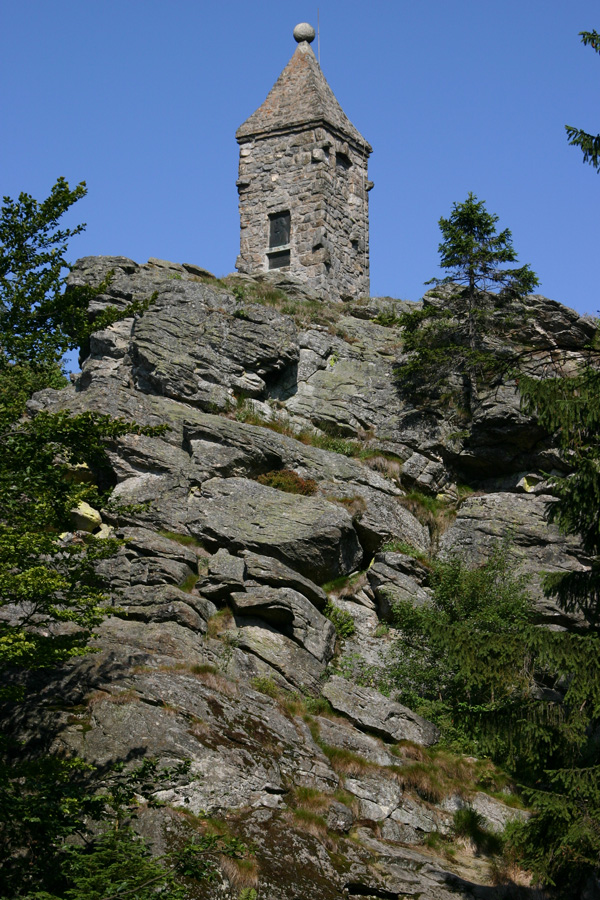
The Waldschmidt Monument

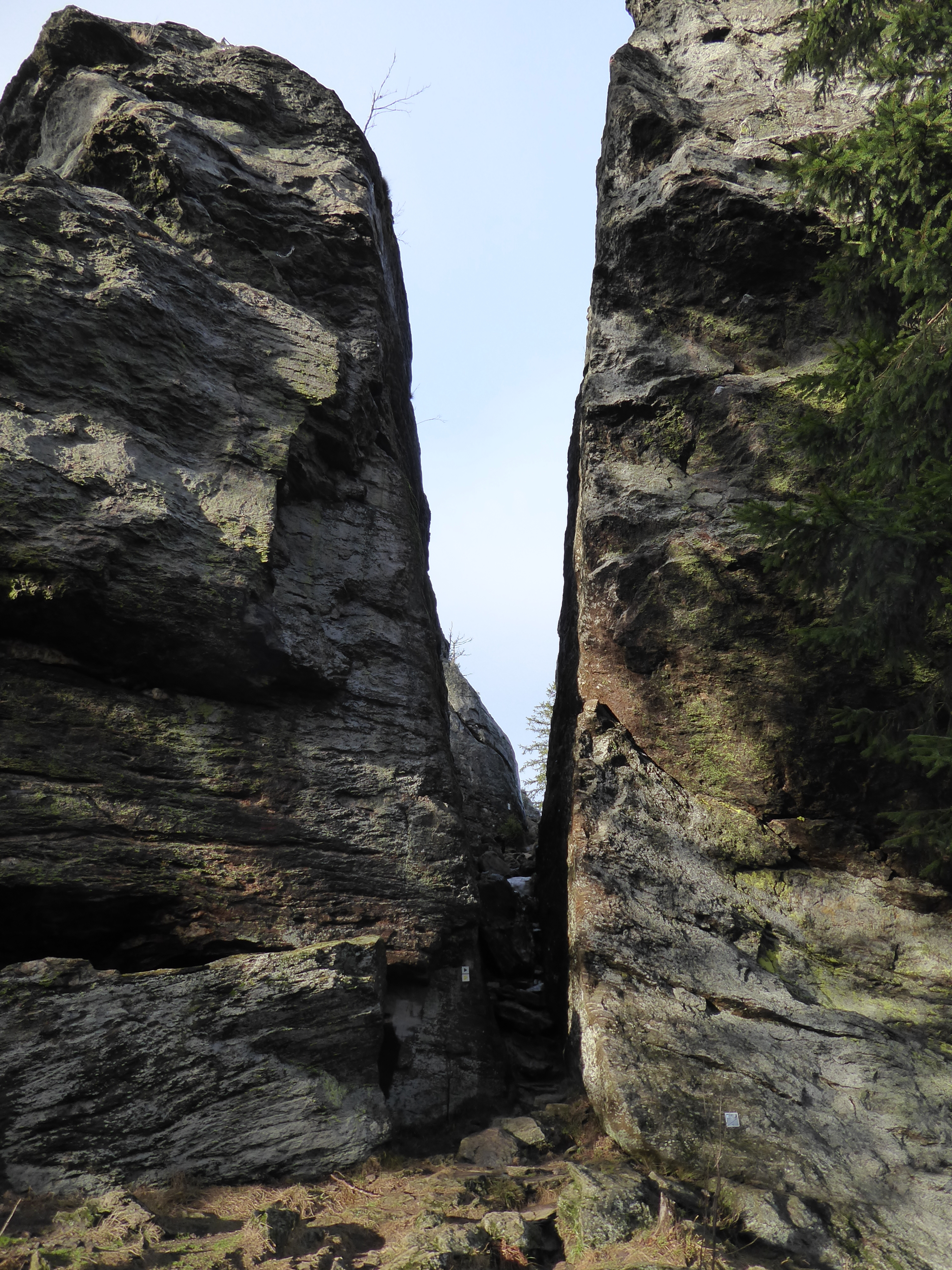
The Rauchröhren

The Kaitersberg is a low mountain crest up to 1,132 metres (3,714 ft) east of Bad Kötzting in the Bavarian Forest in southern Germany. Its long ridge runs eastwards towards the Großer Arber.

The highest peak on the ridge is the 1,132 metre high Großer Riedelstein with its Waldschmidt monument. On another peak, the Mittagstein, 1,034 m (3,392 ft), is the Kötztinger Hütte, a restaurant and mountain hut. Other prominent peaks with odd rock formations made of gneiss are the Kreuzfelsen, 999 m (3,278 ft), with its hilltop cross, and the Rauchröhren, 1,044 m (3,425 ft). Below the Kreuzfelsen is "Highwayman Heigl's Cave" (Räuber-Heigl-Höhle), the hideout of Michael Heigl from Beckendorf, who threatened the area here in the 19th century.

The Rauchröhren offers demanding climbing area of up to 11th grade. Its rock pinnacle is the most difficult of the Bavarian Forest summits (IV).

Occasionally gliders fly above the Kaitersberg from the nearby airfield at Arnbruck, looking for lift from the winds blowing up the slopes in order to gain height when there are no thermals.
