= Journal on European History of Law =

Legal journal

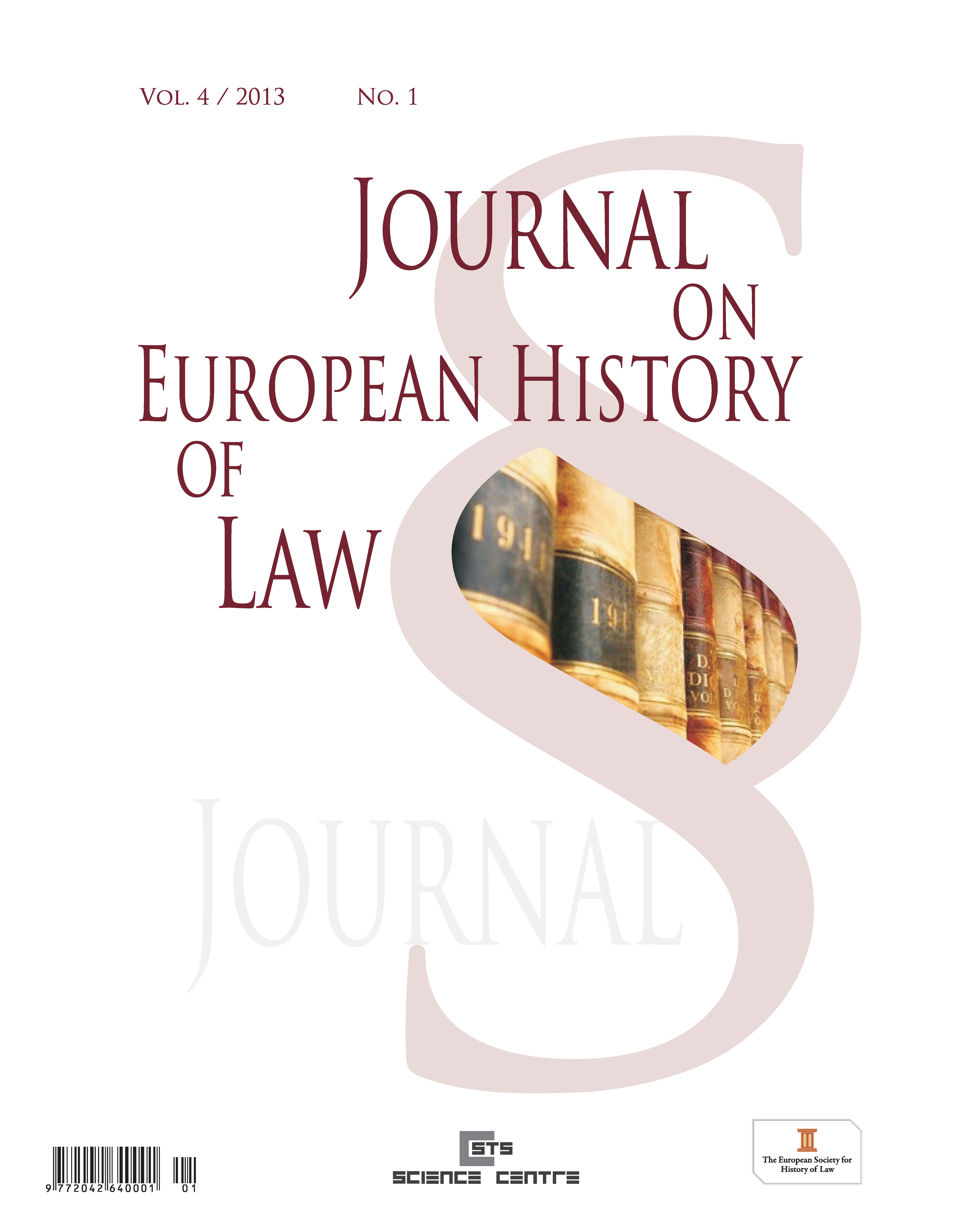
- Discipline: Legal history
- Language: English, German

Publication details
- History: 2010–present
- Publisher: STS Science Centre on behalf of The European Society for History of Law
- Frequency: Biannual

Standard abbreviations
- ISO 4: J. Eur. Hist. Law

Indexing
- ISSN: 2042-6402 (print); 3049-9089 (web)
- OCLC no.: 1113436372

Links
- Journal homepage; Online access; Online archive; Journal page at society website

The Journal on European History of Law is a biannual peer reviewed academic journal covering legal history and Roman law. It was established in 2010 and is published by STS Science Centre on behalf of The European Society for History of Law. The journal contains research articles and book reviews. Articles are published in English and German.

== Abstracting and indexing ==
The journal is abstracted and indexed in EBSCO databases, ERIH PLUS, HeinOnline, and Scopus.

== See also ==
- List of law journals
