= Taucher =

Taucher (German: diver) may refer to:

- "Der Taucher", a ballad by Friedrich Schiller written in 1797
- DJ Taucher, German trance DJ

== People with the surname ==
- Gunnar Taucher (1886–1941), Finnish architect
