= E6 European long distance path =

Walking path in Europe

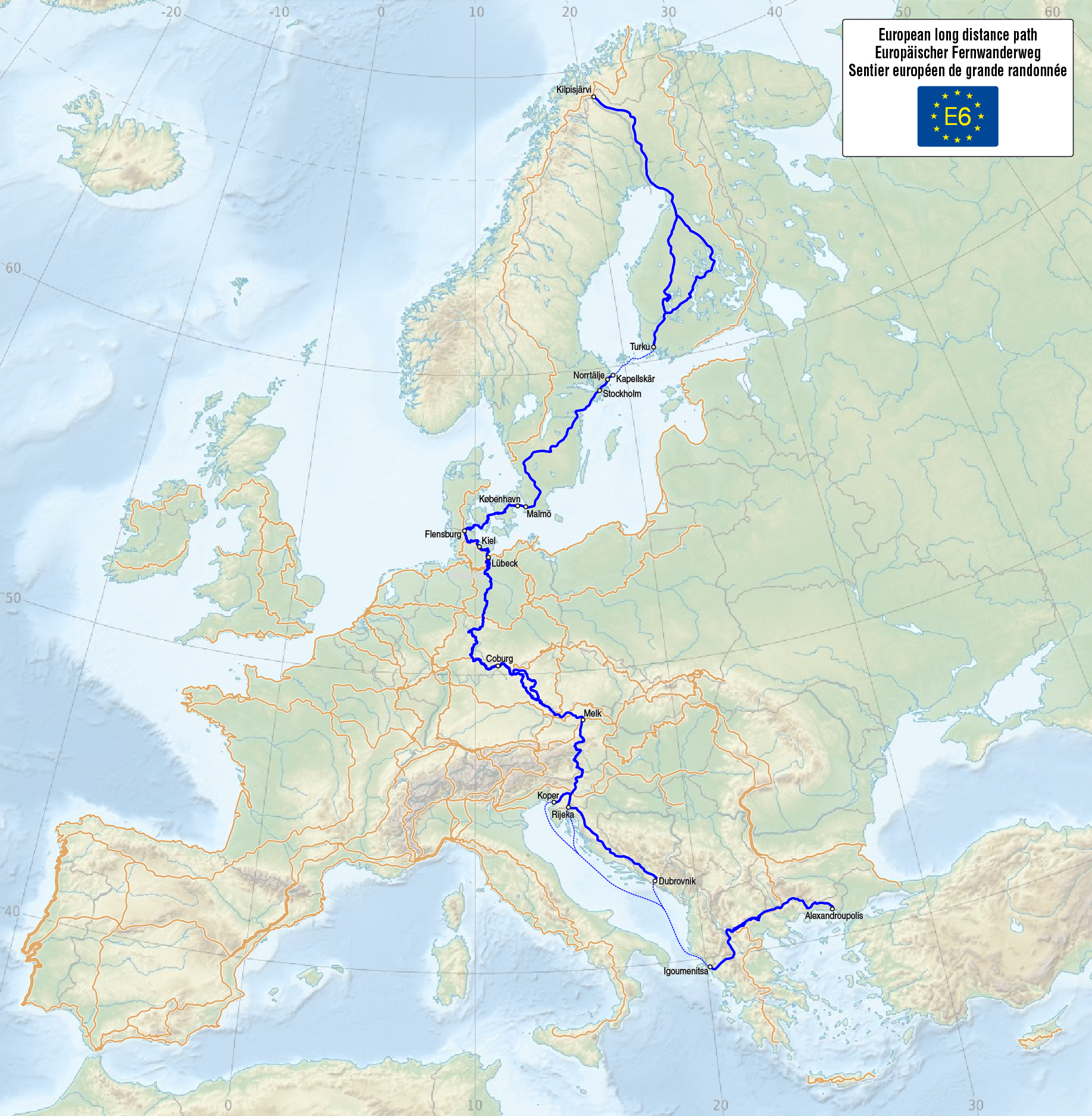
The European walking route E6

The E6 European long distance path or E6 path is one of the European long-distance paths from the northwest tip of Finland through Sweden, Denmark, Germany and Austria to the Adriatic coast in Slovenia. A second section starts again in Greece to finish in Turkey.

== Finland ==
Responsible organisation: Voluntary mappers

European Ramblers' Association doesn’t take the responsibility for E6 in Finland, because of no ERA Member Organisation in this country.

The route connects west side of Finland between Kilpisjärvi and Turku. The route is based on older design of E6. All nature parks and nature trails have been located and connected to get chain of interesting pieces. Digital route is marked in openstreetmap. Some parts are marked well in place (say Kuhankuonon, Pirkantaival, Peuranpolku, Ylläs-Pallas-Hetta) and some parts are provided as is digital route only (e.g. Waymarked trails or Trailmap app).

Design principles on mapping:

- Avoid roads, prefer paths
- Connect available nature trails
- Avoid private yards
- Keep it safe

Some of the places passed on the north-to-south route include:

- Kilpisjärvi, Finland
- Kemi, Finland
- Oulu, Finland
- Ähtäri, Finland
- Virrat, Finland
- Tampere, Finland
- Huittinen, Finland
- Yläne, Finland
- Turku, Finland
- Mariehamn, Finland

== Sweden ==
Responsible organisation: Svenska Turistforeningen

Some of the places passed on the north-to-south route include:

- Grisslehamn, Sweden (reached by ferry)
- Stockholm, Sweden
- the lake country of S Sweden
- Malmö, Sweden

== Denmark ==
Responsible organisation: Dansk Vandrelaug

Route

The E-path starts in Kastrup Airport in Copenhagen and follows the southern side of Copenhagen towards Roskilde.

An alternate E6 starts in Helsingør and follows Nordsjællandsruten to Roskilde. It goes through North Zealand and passes nationalpark Kongernes Nordsjælland.

From Roskilde the E-path follows partly the trail Skjoldungestien to Ringsted. From Ringsted to Korsør the E-path follows its own track. In Korsør you take the train over Great Belt to Nyborg, where the E-path continues south towards Svendborg, where it follows the trail Øhavsstien on the southern part of Fyn. Take the ferry from Svendborg to Ærøskøbing on the island Ærø and continue along Øhavsstien to Søby. Take the ferry from Søby to Fynshav, where you continue south to meet the Leading Quality Trail Gendarmstien. Follow Gendarmstien, passing Sønderborg and Gråsten towards Kruså.

The E-path is well documented on Waymarked Trails

The E-path is not well marked on Fyn.

External links

- European Ramblers Association data on E6 in Denmark

== Germany ==
Responsible organisation: Deutsche Wanderverband

Some of the places passed on the north-to-south route include:

- Kiel, Germany
- Lübeck, Germany
- Fichtel Mountains, Germany
- Dreisesselberg, Germany

== Austria ==
In Austria the E6 follows the routes of Nordwaldkammweg (from Dreisesselberg to Nebelstein) and Nord-Süd-Weitwanderweg 05 (North-South-Trail) to Eibiswald near the Slovenian border.

Some of the places passed on the north-to-south route include:

- Upper Austria:
  - Bad Leonfelden
  - Freistadt
- Lower Austria:
  - Nebelstein
  - Spitz an der Donau (200 m, lowest point in Austria)
  - Melk
  - Lackenhof / Ötscher
- Styria:
  - Mariazell
  - Hochschwab (2277 m, highest point in Austria)
  - Leoben
  - Gleinalpe
  - Koralpe
  - Eibiswald

External links

- European Ramblers Association data on E6 in Austria

== Slovenia ==
Some of the places passed on the north-to-south route include:

- Radlje ob Dravi
- Koper
- Strunjan

== Greece ==
Some of the places passed on the north-to-south route include:

- Igoumenitsa, Greece
- Florina, Greece
- Alexandroupoli, Greece

== Turkey ==
Some of the places passed on the north-to-south route include:

- Dardanelles, Turkey
