= Arnbruck =

- Municipality
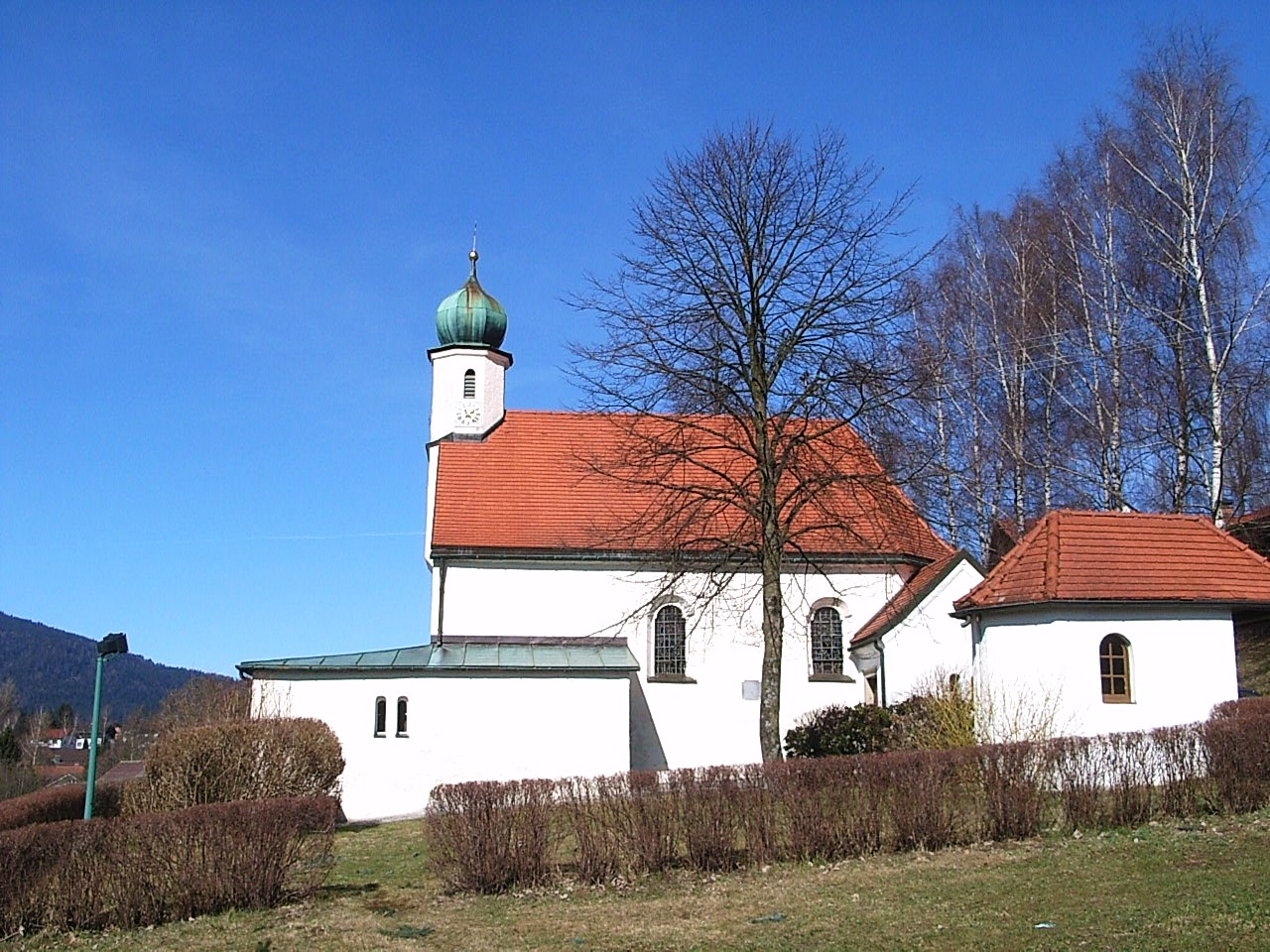
- Chapel of Our Lady

- Coat of arms

- Location of Arnbruck within Regen district
- Interactive map of Arnbruck
- Location within Germany Location within Bavaria
- Coordinates: 49°8′N 13°0′E
- Country: Germany
- State: Bavaria
- Admin. region: Niederbayern
- District: Regen

Government
  - Mayor (2020–26): Angelika Leitermann (CSU)

Area
  - Total: 37.87 km^{2} (14.62 sq mi)
- Elevation: 581 m (1,906 ft)

Population (2025-12-31)
  - Total: 2,031
  - Density: 53.63/km^{2} (138.9/sq mi)
- Time zone: UTC+01:00 (CET)
  - Summer (DST): UTC+02:00 (CEST)
- Postal codes: 93471
- Dialling codes: 09945
- Vehicle registration: REG
- Website: www.arnbruck.de

Arnbruck (German pronunciation: [ˈaʁnbʁʊk]) is a municipality in the district of Regen, in Bavaria, Germany.
