= Bad Kötzting =

- Town
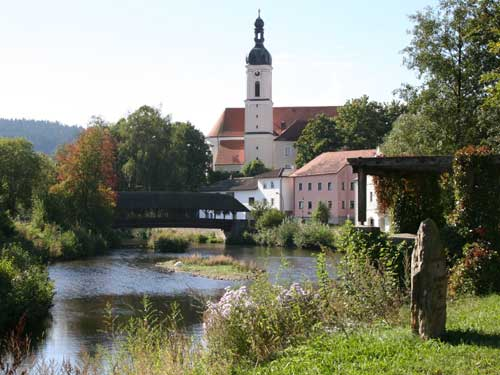
- Church of the Assumption of the Virgin Mary

- Coat of arms

- Location of Bad Kötzting within Cham district
- Interactive map of Bad Kötzting
- Location within Germany Location within Bavaria
- Coordinates: 49°10′37″N 12°51′18″E
- Country: Germany
- State: Bavaria
- Admin. region: Oberpfalz
- District: Cham

Government
  - Mayor (2020–26): Markus Hofmann (FW)

Area
  - Total: 62.15 km^{2} (24.00 sq mi)
- Elevation: 409 m (1,342 ft)

Population (2025-12-31)
  - Total: 7,390
  - Density: 119/km^{2} (308/sq mi)
- Time zone: UTC+01:00 (CET)
  - Summer (DST): UTC+02:00 (CEST)
- Postal codes: 93444
- Dialling codes: 0 99 41
- Vehicle registration: CHA, KÖZ, ROD, WÜM
- Website: www.bad-koetzting.de

Bad Kötzting (German: [baːt ˈkœtstɪŋ]; before 2005: Kötzting; Northern Bavarian: Bad Ketzing) is a town in the district of Cham, in Bavaria, Germany, near the Czech border. It is situated in the Bavarian Forest, 15 km (9.3 mi) southeast of Cham.

== Overview ==
Bad Kötzting has the charming character of a small town and offers quite a variety of attractions for tourists. The locals pride themselves with having one of the largest mounted religious processions in the world, the "Kötztinger Pfingstritt". Legend has it that in the year 1412, a man who got injured during forestry was asking for the last rites before dying in a village approximately 7 kilometres (4 miles) away from Kötzting. The local priest was unable to comply with the wishes of the man because he needed protection from bears, wolves, and other dangers luring along the way. After asking the young men of the village to protect him, they accompanied the priest to the dying man. After a safe journey, the participants vowed to repeat the ride every year. That is how it remained ever since. Every Whit Monday, the ride of over 900 horses and riders is repeated. The horses wear ornaments and the riders wear traditional Bavarian clothes. The ride starts in Kötzting and goes to the village "Steinbühl", where according to the legend, the man asking for anointment, was dying. Only men from the region are allowed to participate in the procession, the participating horses, however, come from all over Bavaria. The annual fair is also in town when the procession takes place. A local "Bierzelt" and numerous rides invite the public.

=== Gallery ===
Impressions from the Kötztinger Pfingstritt, 2001

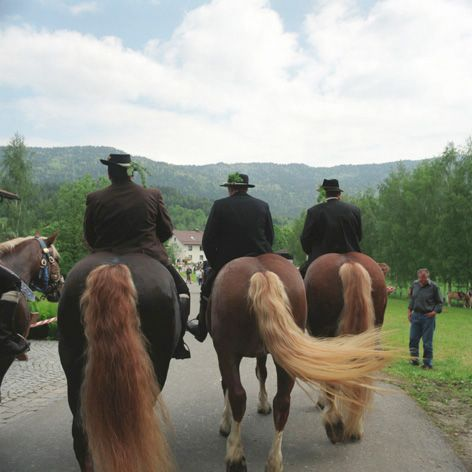

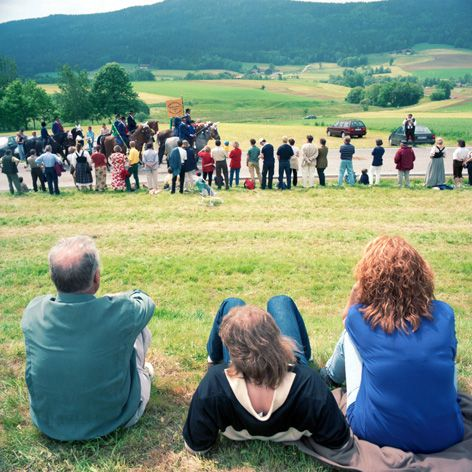

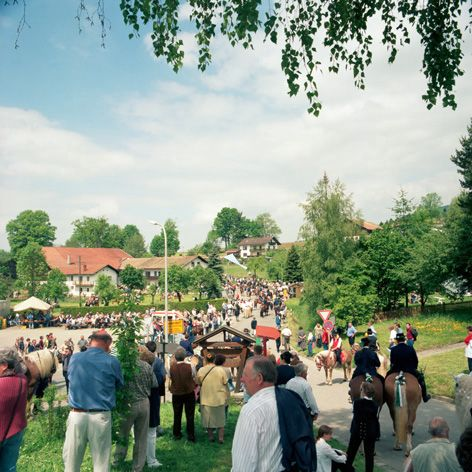

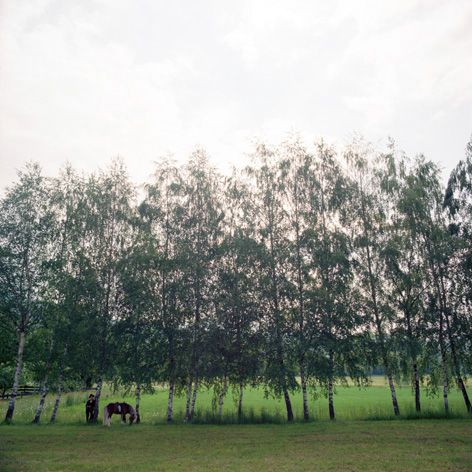

== Administrative division ==
Bad Kötzting is divided into 51 districts:

- Ammermühle
- Arndorf
- Bachmaierholz
- Bad Kötzting
- Bärndorf
- Beckendorf
- Berghäusl
- Bonried
- Buchberg bei Steinbühl
- Buchberg bei Wettzell
- Dachsenbühl
- Fischerhof
- Gadsdorf
- Gehstorf
- Gradis
- Grub
- Hafenberg
- Haus
- Hausermühle
- Himmelreich
- Hofern
- Höfing
- Hofmannsgütl
- Kaitersbach
- Kammern
- Kieslau
- Klobighof
- Leckern
- Liebenstein
- Ludwigsberg
- Maiberg
- Matzelsdorf
- Niesassen
- Ramsried
- Regenstein
- Reitenberg
- Reitenstein
- Ried am Haidstein
- Ried am See
- Riedersfurt
- Sackenried
- Sperlhammer
- Steinbühl
- Stockmühle
- Traidersdorf
- Waid
- Weißenholz
- Weißenregen
- Wettzell
- Wölkersdorf
- Zeltendorf

There are nine Gemarkungen within the municipality area: Arndorf, Bad Kötzting, Gehstorf, Haus, Liebenstein, Sackenried, Traidersdorf, Weißenregen und Wettzell.

== Historical events ==
- 1085 AD: First public recording of "Chostingen".
- 1151: Pope Eugenius III confirms privileges and rights of possession to Abbey Rott.
- 1204: A common court ("Schranne") is established in Kötzting.
- c. 1260: Grant of Market status.
- 1344: Emperor Louis IV confirms the market status.
- c. 1425: Continuous attacks by the Hussites.
- 1583: Bubonic plague strikes the village and surrounding areas.
- 1614: Ownership of land by Abbey Rott is refuted.
- 1633: Thirty Years' War (1618–1648): Swedish forces burn down Kötzting.
- 1648: Thirty Years' War: Last attack by Swedish forces and repeated outbreak of the plague.
- 1770: Widespread starvation throughout the Bavarian Forest.
- 1805: Kötzting becomes an independent parish.
- 1837: As part of a rezoning measure, Kötzting becomes part of the district of Lower Bavaria.
- 1867: Much of the village burns down in a fire covering large parts of the town.
- 1953: Kötzting is granted the status of a town.
- 1965: A military garrison is established in Kötzting.
- 1972: The county of Kötzting is dissolved and the county becomes part of the county of Cham. Hence, Kötzting becomes part of the district of Upper Palatinate.
- 1986: Recognition as Climatic Spa.
- 1990: Laureate in competition "Gastliches Bayern" (guest friendly Bavaria).
- 1992: Opening of the Spa Gardens "Auwiesen".
- 1994: Title of "recreational locality" for all parts of the town.
- 1995: Recognition as "Garden Spa" in the tradition of Father Sebastian Kneipp.
- 2000: Grand Opening of the Casino in Kötzting.
- 2002: Expansion of the Spa Gardens "Auwiesen".
- 2004: Closure of the Garrison "Hohenbogen".
- 2005: Opening of the Open-Air and Adventure Bath ("Bathing world") AQACUR, title of Kneipp-Therapeutic Spa, and change of name to Bad Kötzting.

== Mayor ==
- Since 2014: Markus Hofmann (b. 1975)

== Twin towns – sister cities ==
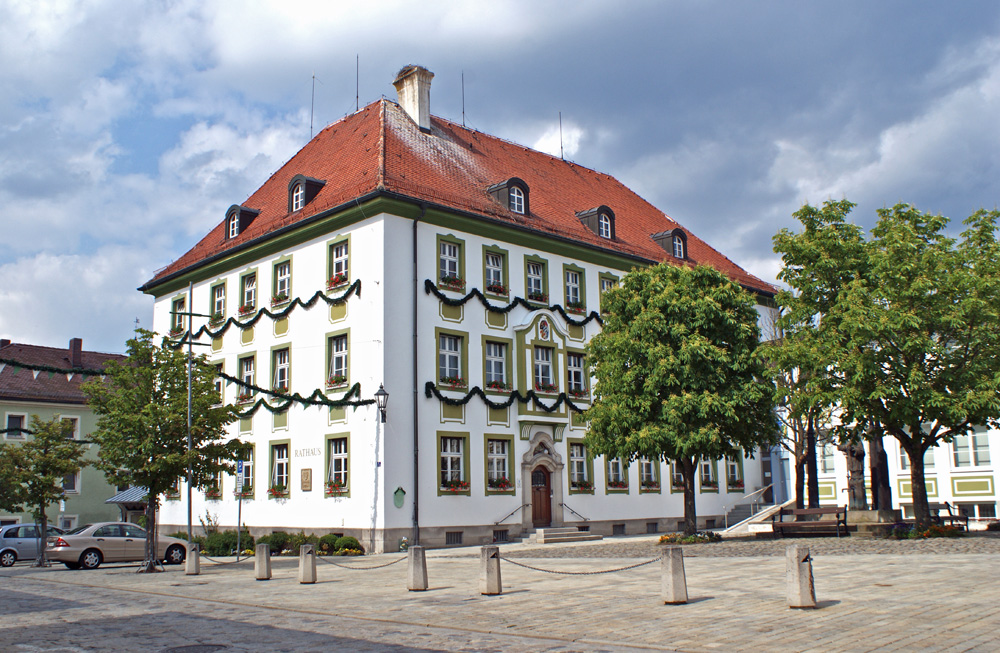
New town hall

Bad Kötzting is a founding member of the Douzelage, a unique town twinning association of towns across the European Union, including United Kingdom. This active town twinning began in 1991 and there are regular events, such as a produce market from each of the other countries and festivals. Other members of Douzelage are:

- Agros, Cyprus
- Altea, Spain
- Asikkala, Finland
- Bellagio, Italy
- (Republic of Ireland) Bundoran, Ireland
- Chojna, Poland
- Granville, France
- Holstebro, Denmark
- Houffalize, Belgium
- Judenburg, Austria
- Kőszeg, Hungary
- Marsaskala, Malta
- Meerssen, Netherlands
- Niederanven, Luxembourg
- Oxelösund, Sweden
- Preveza, Greece
- Rokiškis, Lithuania
- Rovinj, Croatia
- Sesimbra, Portugal
- Sherborne, United Kingdom
- Sigulda, Latvia
- Siret, Romania
- Škofja Loka, Slovenia
- Sušice, Czech Republic
- Tryavna, Bulgaria
- Türi, Estonia
- Zvolen, Slovakia

== Notable people ==
- Benedict Stattler (1728–1797), Catholic theologian of the enlightenment
- Anton Schwarz (1858–1931), composer and music teacher
- Helmut Brunner (politician) (born 1954), politician (CSU) and Bavarian minister
- Thomas Dworzak (born 1972), photographer
- Matthias Aschenbrenner (born 1972), mathematician

== See also ==
- Geodetic Observatory Wettzell
