= Hoher Bogen =

Mountain in Germany

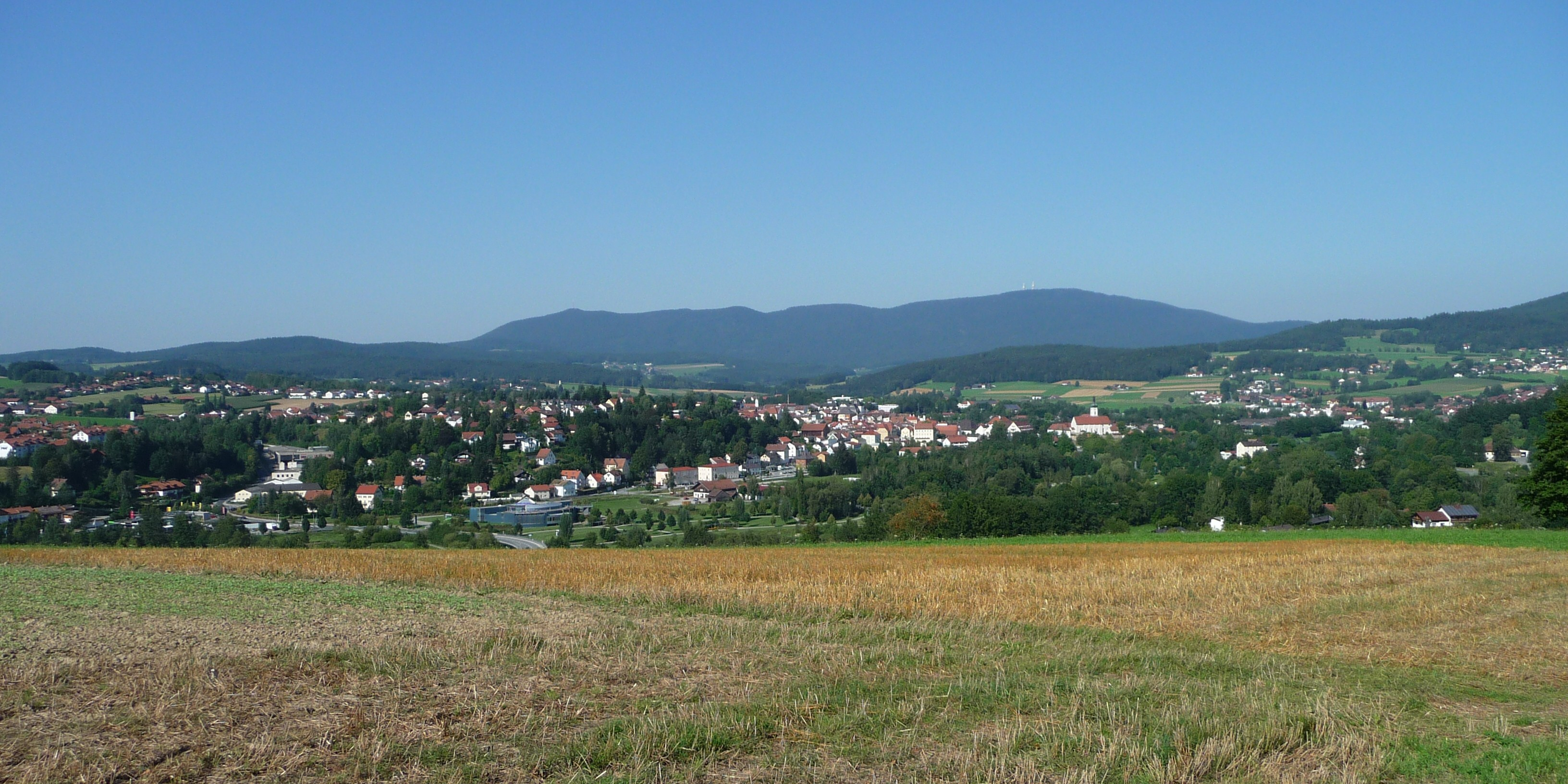
- The ridge of the Hoher Bogen

Highest point
- Elevation: 1,079 m above sea level (NHN) (3,540 ft)
- Listing: – Towers of the former telecommunication sector F – Hoher Bogen Transmitter
- Coordinates: 49°14′02″N 12°56′04″E

Geography
- Location within Bavaria
- Location: Cham, Bavaria
- Parent range: Bavarian Forest

Geology
- Rock type(s): amphibolite, gabbro

The Hohe Bogen (archaically often Hohenbogen) is a roughly 8-kilometre-long mountain ridge in the Bavarian Forest.

It rises in the Bavarian province of Upper Palatinate in the county of Cham and is almost equally divided between the municipalities of Neukirchen b. Hl. Blut, Rimbach and Eschlkam between Furth im Wald and Bad Kötzting. Its territory includes, from northwest to southeast, the summits of the Burgstall (976 m), Bärenriegel (1,017 m), Eckstein (1,073 m), Schwarzriegel (1,079 m) and Ahornriegel (1,050 m). On the Burgstall there is a transmission site, on the Schwarzriegel is an old Luftwaffe transmission tower.

On the northern slopes of the Ahornriegel is a ski area. A double chairlift, 1.36 kilometres long, transports passengers through 393 vertical metres in 15 minutes and runs to the top of the mountain.

== Name ==
According to research by local historian, Ludwig Baumann, from Bad Kötzting, the mountain's name, "Hoher Bogen", does not - as is often assumed - derive from the ridge's morphological landscape shape of a "high arc" (Hoher = "high", Bogen = "arc" or "bow"), but from the counts of Bogen who built a castle on the Burgstall (Burgstall = site of a former castle") around 1190 (where today's transmitter is). Its owner, Albert III of Bogen, was banished in 1193, so that the remote castle probably remained unfinished and fell into ruin. Remains of a moat have survived. Thus the name "Hohenbogen" is to be understood as the higher castle of the Bogen family (as opposed to the lower castle near Bogen). A similar development of names can be seen in the "Hohenstaufen" (high seat of the Staufer family), "Hohenschwangau" (House of Welf) and "Hohenzollern". In 1242, the Hoher Bogen went to the House of Wittelsbach.

== Geography ==
Apart from the lower southwestern slopes, the Hoher Bogen occupies a special geological position in the Bavarian Forest. It forms the southern end of a gabbro-amphibolite massif in the immediate vicinity of the Bohemian Massif, whereby the gabbros were almost completely converted into amphibolite.

The low seepage capacity of the subsoil allows hundreds of small springs and stream channels to form on the flanks of the Hoher Bogen. To the north these flow into the Kaltenbach, a tributary of the Freybach; the south-flowing streams are collected by the White Regen river.

Until 1991, the German Met Office operated a precipitation-measuring station on the mountain at an altitude of 903 metres, which determined an average annual of 1,051 millimetres of precipitation from 1931 to 1960. The average snow cover from September to May is 46.8 centimetres.

In addition to the 922 hectares of state forest managed by the Bavarian State Forests (subdivision: Forstbetrieb Roding), there is about twice as much private forest with an average plot size of 2 to 3 hectares in the area of the Hoher Bogen, especially on the lower slopes.

The vegetation consists mainly of spruce forest, but especially in the state forest there are also extensive beech woods and mixed beech forests. The liverleaf and spring vetch grow here, the only place they occur in the Bavarian Forest.

== Surveillance tower ==
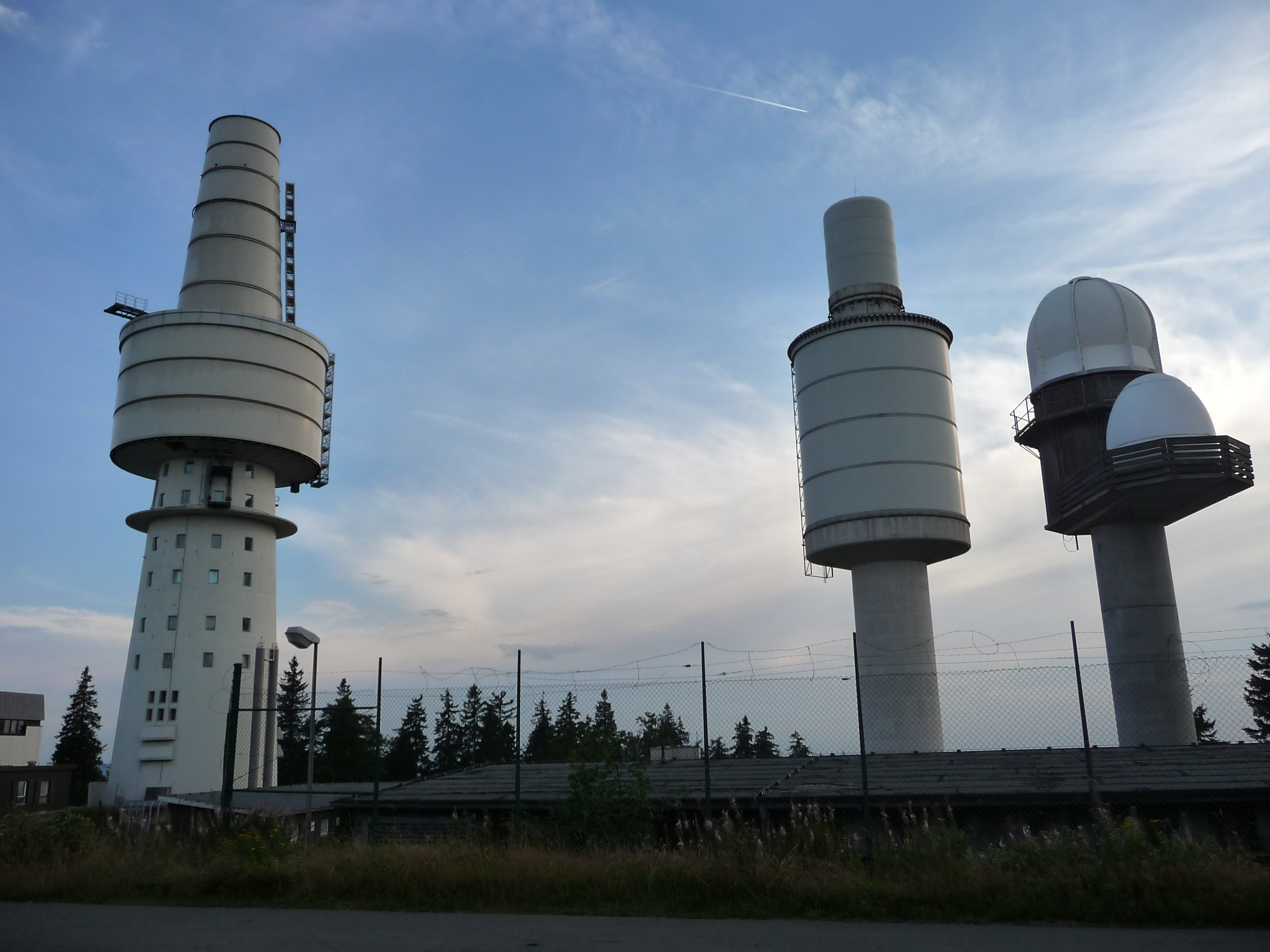
Telecommunication tower on the Hoher Bogen

A NATO listening post for the so-called Communication Sector F, also located here, was shut down in 2004. As well as members of the Bundeswehr, American units were stationed there until 1992 and French units until 1994. It consisted of two towers and a complex passive reception and monitoring system. Since autumn 2014, the 75-metre-high main tower has been fitted with an externally-mounted steel staircase and a viewing platform at a height of 50 metres and is open to the public as a viewing tower at certain visiting times. In the medium term, various media in the area of the stairs and viewing platform will be used to inform visitors about the history of the site and its planned future use as a European meeting centre. The owner of the facility is the Hoher Bogen Mountain Resort.

== Hoher Bogen sport and leisure centre ==
At the foot of the Hoher Bogen is a sport and leisure centre. In summer you can take the sommerrodelbahn from the middle station of the cable car. There is also a skate- and fun park and a grass kart run. In winter, in addition to downhill skiing and snowboarding, there is also a toboggan run and also a ski jump at the top station. The facility can be used all year round.

== Hoher Bogen transmitter site ==
On the 976-metre-high Burgstall near Furth im Wald the Bayerischer Rundfunk operate the Hoher Bogen Transmitter. It broadcasts VHF, DAB and TV programmes and is a radio relay and mobile telephone mast.

== Treasure at the Hoher Bogen ==
In their book Der bayrische Wald (1846), Bernhard Grueber and Adalbert Müller describe in detail a legend about the treasure, which is supposed to be kept in a copper brewing kettle under the Burgstall. When the right finder comes along and performs certain tasks exactly, the kettle lifts itself and pours out its contents of gold and diamonds. When in 1803 or 1804, a Bohemian travel company played music at the Burgstall, farmers came along with picks and shovels because they suspected that someone had lifted the treasure.

== Literature ==
- Markus von Gaisberg: Naturnahe Waldgesellschaften am Hohen Bogen im nördlichen Bayerischen Wald, in: Hoppea. Denkschriften der Regensburgischen Botanischen Gesellschaft, Vol. 57, Regensburg, 1996, pp. 145–215
- Bernhard Grueber, Adalbert Müller: Der bayrische Wald. 1846, Neudruck 1993, Grafenau, Morsak Verlag, ISBN 3-87553-415-8
