= Rimbach =

Rimbach may refer to the following places:

- in Germany:
  - Rimbach, Upper Palatinate, in the district of Cham, Bavaria
  - Rimbach, Lower Bavaria, in the district Rottal-Inn, Bavaria
  - Rimbach, Hesse, in the district Bergstraße, Hesse
  - Rimbach (Herrgottsbach), a river of Baden-Württemberg, upper course of the Herrgottsbach
- in France:
  - Rimbach-près-Masevaux, in the department Haut-Rhin
  - Rimbach-près-Guebwiller, in the department Haut-Rhin
