= Tiefenbach (Verwaltungsgemeinschaft) =

- Verwaltungsgemeinschaft
- Location of Tiefenbach within Cham district
- Interactive map of Tiefenbach
- Location within Germany Location within Bavaria
- Coordinates: 49°26′N 12°35′E
- Country: Germany
- State: Bavaria
- Admin. region: Upper Palatinate
- District: Cham
- Seat: Tiefenbach
- Subdivisions: 2 municipalities

Area
  - Total: 66.7 km^{2} (25.8 sq mi)

Population (2025-12-31)
  - Total: 2,794
  - Density: 41.9/km^{2} (108/sq mi)
- Time zone: UTC+01:00 (CET)
  - Summer (DST): UTC+02:00 (CEST)
- Website: tiefenbach-opf.de

Tiefenbach is a Verwaltungsgemeinschaft (municipal association) in the district of Cham in Bavaria, Germany. Its seat is in Tiefenbach. It consists of the following municipalities:

1. Tiefenbach
2. Treffelstein
