= Lac des Perches =

Lake in Haut-Rhin, France

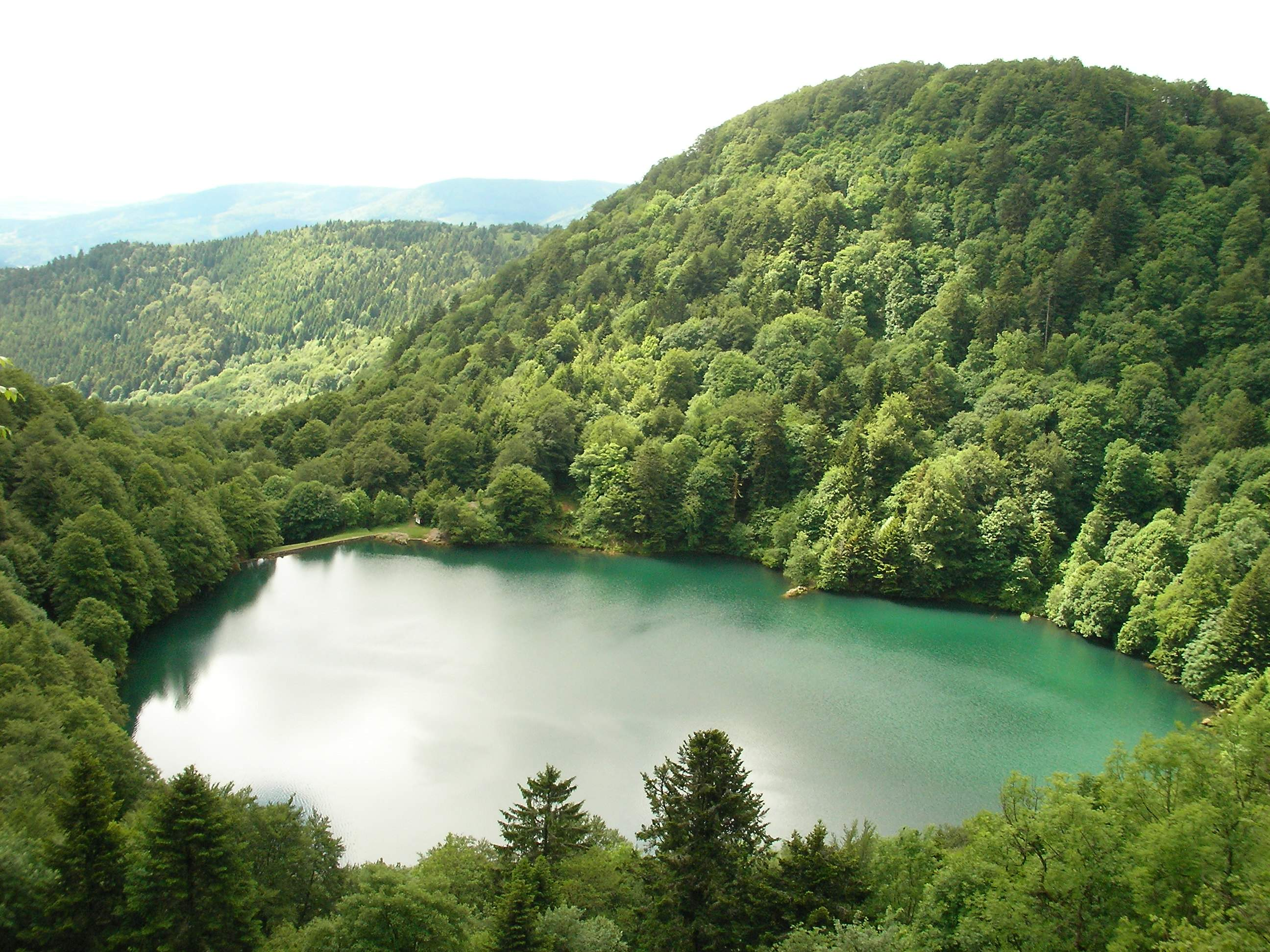

- Location within France
- Location: Haut-Rhin
- Coordinates: 47°50′47″N 6°55′22″E
- Type: glacial
- Basin countries: France
- Surface area: 0.044 km^{2} (0.017 sq mi)
- Max. depth: 17 m (56 ft)
- Surface elevation: 984 m (3,228 ft)

Lac des Perches is a lake in Haut-Rhin, France. At an elevation of 984 m, its surface area is 0.044 km². It is located on the Alsatian side of the Vosges Mountains in the municipality of Rimbach-près-Masevaux.

== Toponymy ==
The 19th century German name of the lake was Sternsee (lake of the star). This name came from an alteration of Ternsee ou Ternensee. Its French name comes from a misinterpretation of the patois toponym Lac des Bers (Bers referring to a kind of mountain pasture, as in the Haute Bers mountain which lies on the southwest of the lake), which was read into Bärsch (in German perch) and translated into the present-day name of the lake.

== History ==
It is a Glacial Lake that was dammed in the 16th century to provide power to forges and to textile mills.

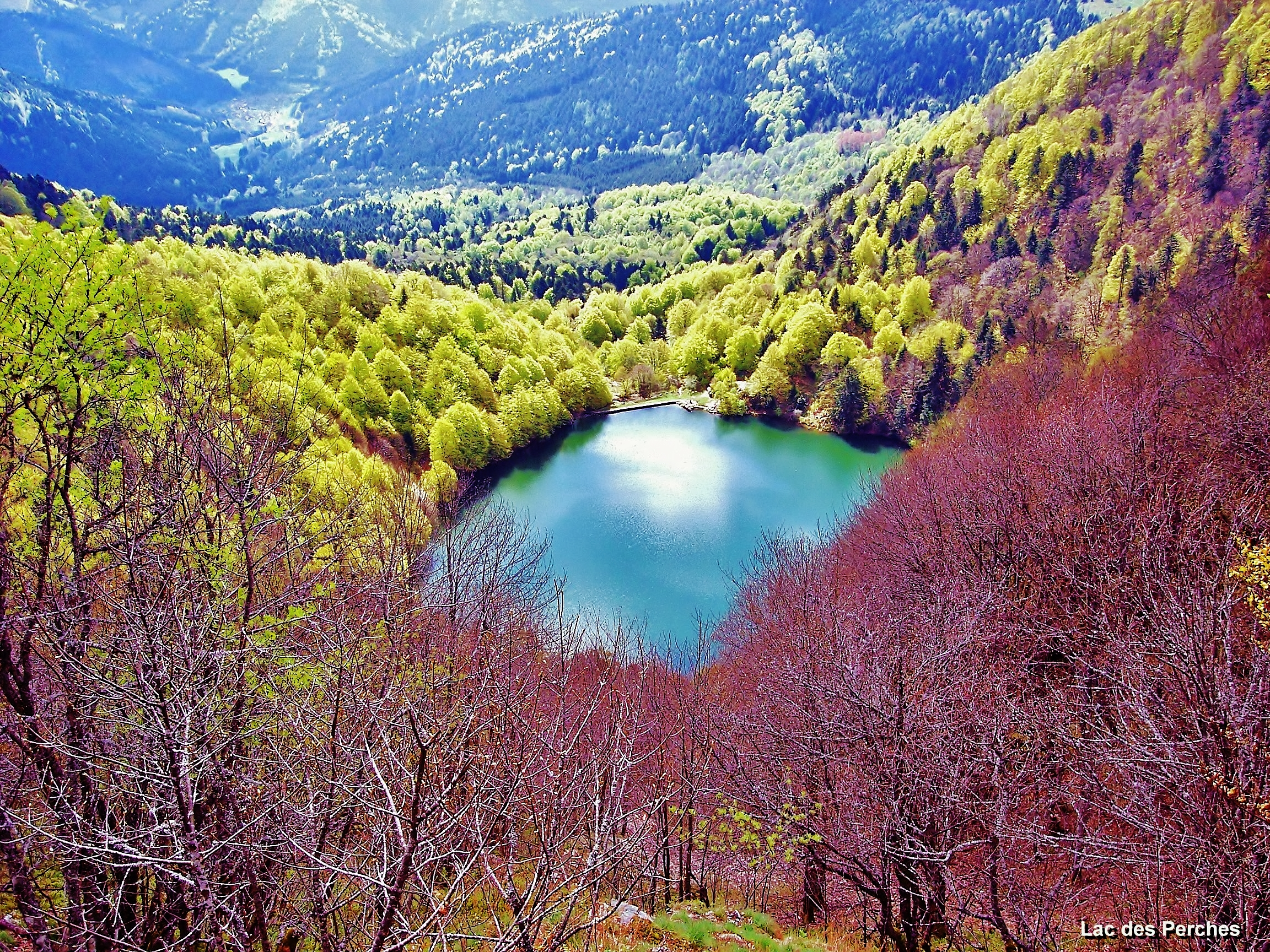

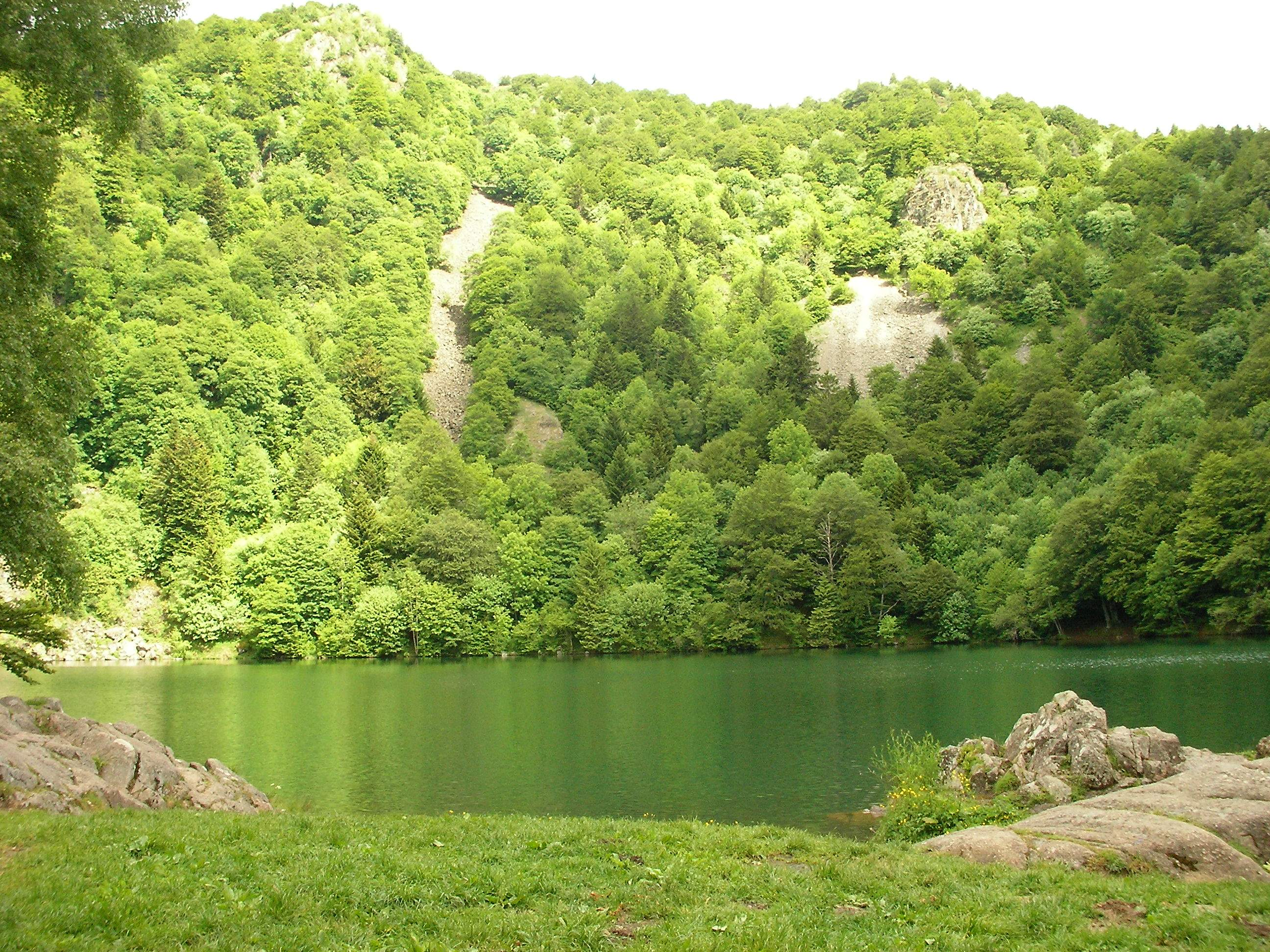
