= Heinz Wiendl =

German neurologist

Heinz Wiendl (born 1968 in Rötz) is a German neurologist and professor at the University Hospital Freiburg. He is known for his works in the field of nervous system inflammation and multiple sclerosis.

== Early life and education ==
From 1989 to 1996, Wiendl studied psychology and medicine at the University of Erlangen-Nuremberg, Duke University in North Carolina, and the University of Basel in Switzerland. He received his medical degree in 1996. He was a scholar of the Deutsche Forschungsgemeinschaft (DFG) at the Max Planck Institute of Neurobiology in Martinsried and subsequently worked as a clinical and research fellow at the Department of Neurology at the University of Tübingen. In 2004, he obtained board certification in neurology and completed his habilitation.

== Academic career ==
In 2005, Wiendl was appointed professor of neurology and head of the clinical research group for MS and neuroimmunology at the University of Würzburg, where he also served as vice-chair of the Department of Neurology. In 2010, he became director of the Department of Neurology – Inflammatory Diseases of the Nervous System and Neurooncology at the University of Münster.[2] From 2013 to 2024, he headed the Department of Neurology at Münster University Hospital. In October 2024, Wiendl was appointed director of the Department of Neurology and Neurophysiology at the University Hospital Freiburg.

== Research ==
Wiendl's research focuses on five main areas:

Precision neuroimmunology: He co-led a study using high-dimensional flow cytometry and serum proteomics to identify distinct immunological endophenotypes in early multiple sclerosis, advancing detailed patient stratification and personalized treatment approaches.

Neurological immune therapy: Wiendl contributed to clinical and mechanistic insights into immune reconstitution therapies, laying foundational concepts for achieving durable remission in MS.

Diagnostic, prognostic, and therapeutic biomarkers: He was part of collaborative work that identified peripheral blood immune signatures predictive of MS disease course and treatment response.

Rare but paradigmatic neuroimmunological diseases: Heinz Wiendl authored several reviews summarizing mechanistic insights from rare neuroimmunological diseases — such as Susac syndrome, Rasmussen encephalitis, and type 1 narcolepsy — which offer models for understanding broader disease mechanisms.

Surrogates of disease progression: Wiendl has examined treatment effects on disability progression, including the use of confirmed disability progression (CDP) as a robust clinical measure in MS therapeutic trials.

== Professional memberships ==
Wiendl is a member of the German Society for Immunology (DGfI), the German Multiple Sclerosis Society (DMSG), the German Society for Muscular Diseases (DGM), the German Society of Neurology (DGN), the American Academy of Neurology (AAN), and the International Society of Neuroimmunology (ISNI).[14] He is also a member of the editorial board of PLOS ONE.

== Awards and monors ==
- 2017: Honorary professor at Sydney Medical School
- 2015: Sobek Prize for MS research, German Society of Multiple Sclerosis (DMSG)
- 2009: Heinrich-Pette Award, German Society for Neurology (DGN)
- 2004: Sobek Prize for MS research (young scientists' award), German Society of Multiple Sclerosis (DMSG)
- 2003: Felix Jerusalem Prize, German Society for Muscular Disease (DGM)

== Funding ==
Wiendl has received research funding from the European Union, the German Federal Ministry of Education and Research (BMBF), the state of North Rhine-Westphalia, the DFG, the Innovative Medical Research (IMF) program of the Medical Faculty Münster, the Interdisciplinary Centre for Clinical Research (IZKF) Münster, the Else Kröner-Fresenius Foundation, and the RE Children's Foundation.

== Publications ==
As of September 2025, Wiendl has authored or co-authored more than 650 research articles and reviews, as well as several books, and book chapters.

- H. Wiendl Publication list ResearchGate
- H. Wiendl Publication list PubMed
