= Mariä Himmelfahrt (Freyung) =

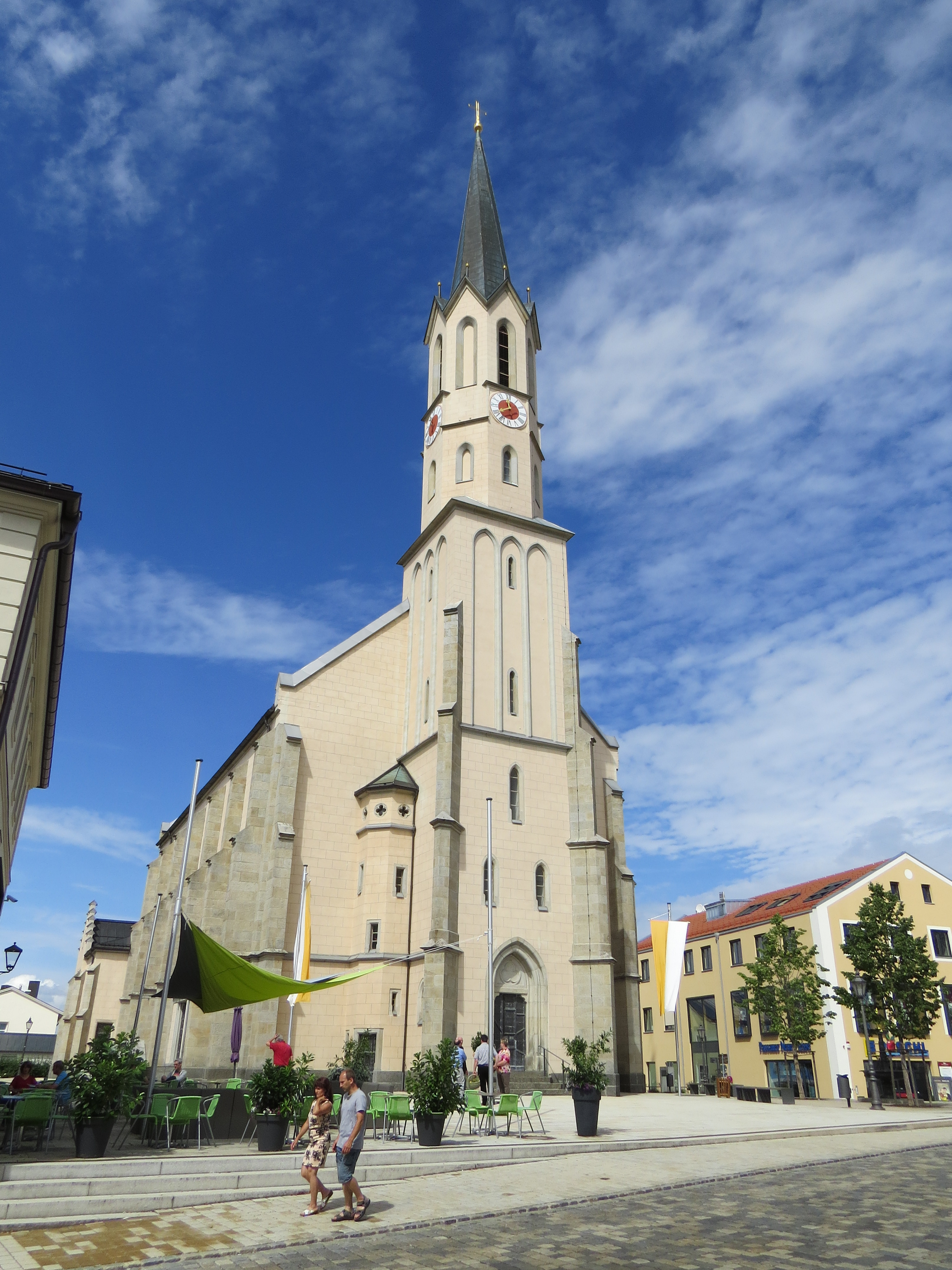
- Image of the church from the front

- 48°48′29.07″N 13°32′49.05″E
- Location: Freyung, Niederbayern, Bavaria
- Country: Germany
- Denomination: Catholic

History
- Status: active

Architecture
- Style: Late Gothic
- Completed: 1877

Specifications
- Length: 39 meters
- Width: 24 meters

Mariä Himmelfahrt is a Roman Catholic church in Freyung, Bavaria.

== History ==
The original church was destroyed in a massive fire and was replaced by the current structure in 1877 to the plans of architect J.J. Tanera. The church was inaugurated by the bishop of Passau.

== Building ==
The new building was inspired by the late Gothic architecture of eastern Bavaria. The facade design is simple. The neo-Gothic winged altar is striking in the single-aisled nave. The building is 47 m long and 16 m wide, the interior is 14 m high, and the church tower measures 56 m.

== Bells ==
In 1949, the Perner company cast four new bells made out of bronze.

== Surroundings ==
The church is in the center of Freyung, next to it is a restaurant called Veicht, a fountain with a statue of Mary and a memorial dedicated to Maximilian Schmidt.
