= MAC Mode =

German clothing manufacturer

- Type: GmbH & Co KGaA
- Industry: Textile
- Founded: 1973; 53 years ago
- Headquarters: Wald (Upper Palatinate), Bavaria, Germany
- Area served: Europe, North America
- Products: Jeans
- Revenue: 121 million Euro
- Number of employees: 330
- Website: mac-jeans.com

MAC Mode (Fashion) GmbH & Co KGaA is a German clothing manufacturer founded in 1973 and located in Wald/Rossbach, near Regensburg. The company produces jeans and trousers in the medium-priced premium category.

== History ==
The company was founded in 1973 in Rossbach in the Upper Palatinate region of Germany. In the first nine months after the company was started 89,000 pairs of trousers were sold. According to its own statements the MAC fashion company has been selling more than 6 million pairs of ladies’ and men's trousers annually since then.

== Products ==
MAC produces ladies’ and men's pants for the specialist retail sector. Elastic and solid jeans types as well as pants from flat-woven fabrics are produced. Women's trousers/pants make up around 68% of production with men's pants the remaining 32%. This family business also produces a small number of denim jackets apart from its core business of trousers. The company enters the market every year with six collections (men's and women's clothing). It processes 7,500,000 metres (24,600,000 ft) of fabric and more than 4000 different materials annually. The fabrics are only sourced from European manufacturers. The style is described as modern, high-value and “perfect fit”. The range is compiled, updated and expanded at seasonally.

=== Locations ===
The headquarters are situated in Wald/Rossbach, near Regensburg. MAC has roughly 330 employees with an average age of 34 working at this Upper Palatinate headquarter. Production takes place mostly in Europe, Tunisia and Turkey. There are around 3400 employees at the different production locations. MAC sells its products via stationary trading partners in Germany, Austria, Switzerland, Sweden, Denmark, Finland, Central and Eastern Europe, the Netherlands, the United Kingdom, Ireland, France, Spain, Portugal as well as in North America and through its own online shop and online trading partners. In addition, the company operates several outlets throughout Germany.
