= Michelsneukirchen =

- Municipality
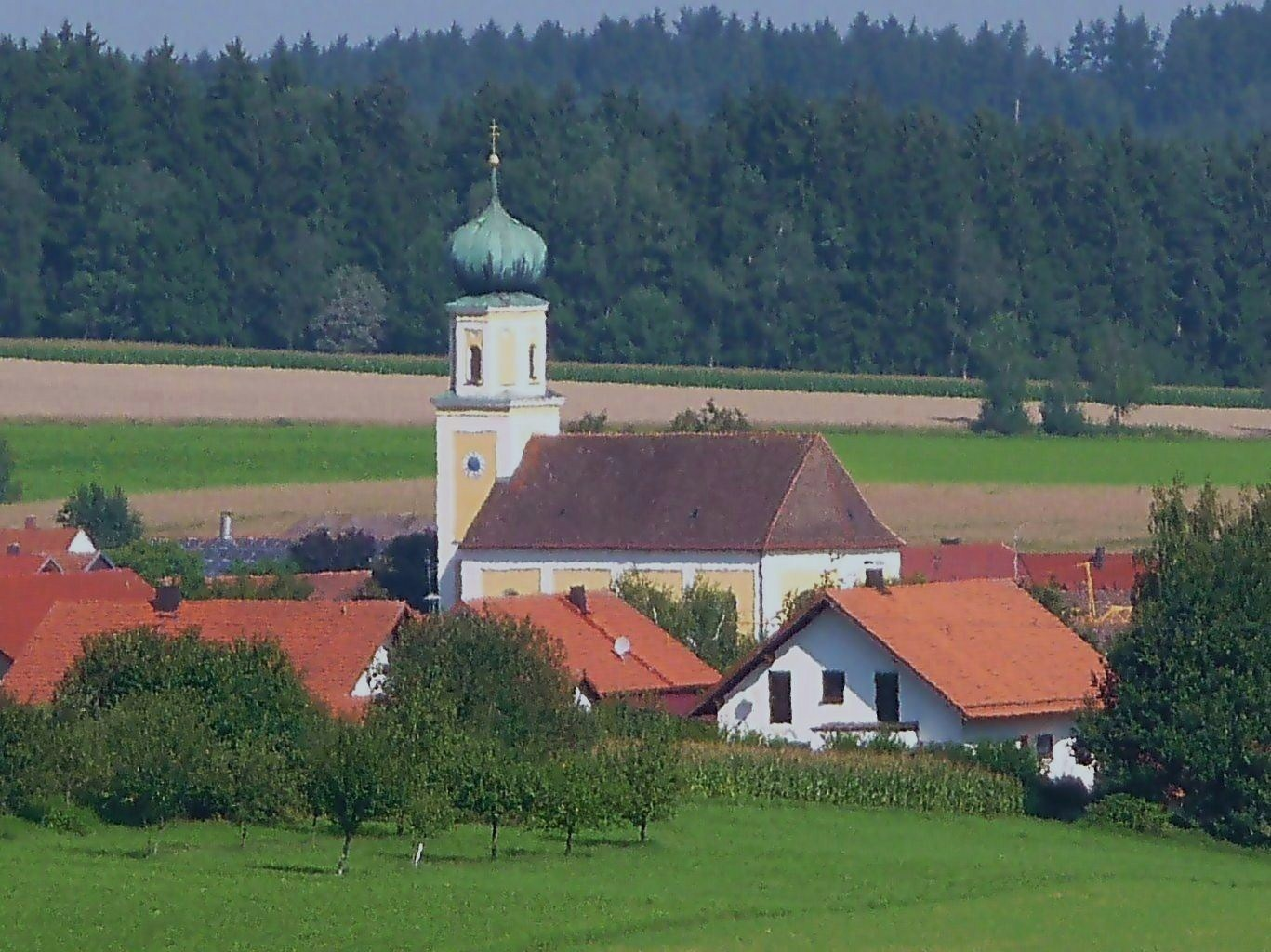
- Saint Michael Church

- Coat of arms

- Location of Michelsneukirchen within Cham district
- Interactive map of Michelsneukirchen
- Location within Germany Location within Bavaria
- Coordinates: 49°7′27″N 12°33′9″E
- Country: Germany
- State: Bavaria
- Admin. region: Oberpfalz
- District: Cham
- Municipal assoc.: Falkenstein

Government
  - Mayor (2020–26): Christian Raab

Area
  - Total: 32.86 km^{2} (12.69 sq mi)
- Elevation: 569 m (1,867 ft)

Population (2025-12-31)
  - Total: 1,728
  - Density: 52.59/km^{2} (136.2/sq mi)
- Time zone: UTC+01:00 (CET)
  - Summer (DST): UTC+02:00 (CEST)
- Postal codes: 93185
- Dialling codes: 0 94 67
- Vehicle registration: CHA
- Website: www.michelsneukirchen.de

Michelsneukirchen is a municipality in Oberpfälzer district of Cham in Bavaria in Germany.

== Geography ==
The village is located in the Bavarian Forest. Adjoining municipalities are Schorndorf, Falkenstein, Obertrübenbach and in Zinzenzell in Niederbayern. There are several small villages in Michelsneukirchen, such as Dörfling, Woppmannsdorf, Momannsfelden, Regelsmais and Ponholz.

== History ==
The village belonged to the masters of Falkenstein.

== Crest ==
Michelsneukirchen's crest is "divided by red and gold; a silver flaming sword in front, three tilted lozenges in the back."
