= Wilhelm Max Müller =

American orientalist (1862–1919)

- in 1906
- Born: 15 May 1862; Gleißenberg, Kingdom of Bavaria
- Died: 12 July 1919 (aged 57); Wildwood, New Jersey, US

Academic background
- Education: Leipzig University (PhD)

Academic work
- Discipline: Orientalist
- Sub-discipline: Egyptology
- Institutions: Reformed Episcopal Seminary; University of Pennsylvania

Wilhelm Max Müller (15 May 1862 – 12 July 1919) was a German-born American orientalist.

== Biography ==
Letter from Müller (1915)

Müller was born in Gleißenberg, Germany. He received his higher education at the University of Erlangen, the Friedrich Wilhelm University of Berlin, the Ludwig-Maximilians-Universität München, and Leipzig University, where he received his Phd He was one of the last students of the Egyptologist Georg Ebers.

Müller immigrated to the United States in 1888. He was a professor at the Reformed Episcopal Seminary in Philadelphia beginning in 1890. During several years (1904, 1906, 1910), he engaged in archaeological work in Egypt for the Carnegie Institution. He lectured on Egyptology at the University of Pennsylvania and purchased papyri in Egypt for the University Museum.

He died in a drowning accident in Wildwood, New Jersey, in July 1919.

== Works ==
- Asien und Europa nach altägyptischen Denkmälern (lit. "Asia and Europe on Egyptian Monuments", 1893)
- Die Liebespoesie der alten Ägypter (lit. "The Love Poetry of the Ancient Egyptians", 1899)
- Müller, Max (1904). "The Egyptian Monument of Tell Esh-Shihab". Quarterly Statement. 36. Palestine Exploration Fund: 78–80. doi:10.1179/peq.1904.36.1.78.
- Egyptian Mythology, vol. XII in Marshall Jones, ed., The Mythology of All Races, Boston, 1918; New York: Dover, 2005, ISBN 0-486-43674-8

He was a contributor to the Encyclopædia Biblica and the Jewish Encyclopædia. After 1905 he served as joint editor of the Gesenius Hebrew Dictionary.

He wrote on the identification of Keftiu and concluded that it could not be Phoenicia.
