= Weiding (Verwaltungsgemeinschaft) =

- Verwaltungsgemeinschaft
- Location of Weiding within Cham district
- Interactive map of Weiding
- Location within Germany Location within Bavaria
- Coordinates: 49°16′N 12°46′E
- Country: Germany
- State: Bavaria
- Admin. region: Upper Palatinate
- District: Cham
- Seat: Weiding
- Subdivisions: 2 municipalities

Area
  - Total: 43.54 km^{2} (16.81 sq mi)

Population (2025-12-31)
  - Total: 3,211
  - Density: 73.75/km^{2} (191.0/sq mi)
- Time zone: UTC+01:00 (CET)
  - Summer (DST): UTC+02:00 (CEST)
- Website: gleissenberg.de

Weiding is a Verwaltungsgemeinschaft (municipal association) in the district of Cham in Bavaria, Germany. Its seat is in Weiding. It consists of the following municipalities:

1. Gleißenberg
2. Weiding
