= Chamerau =

- Municipality
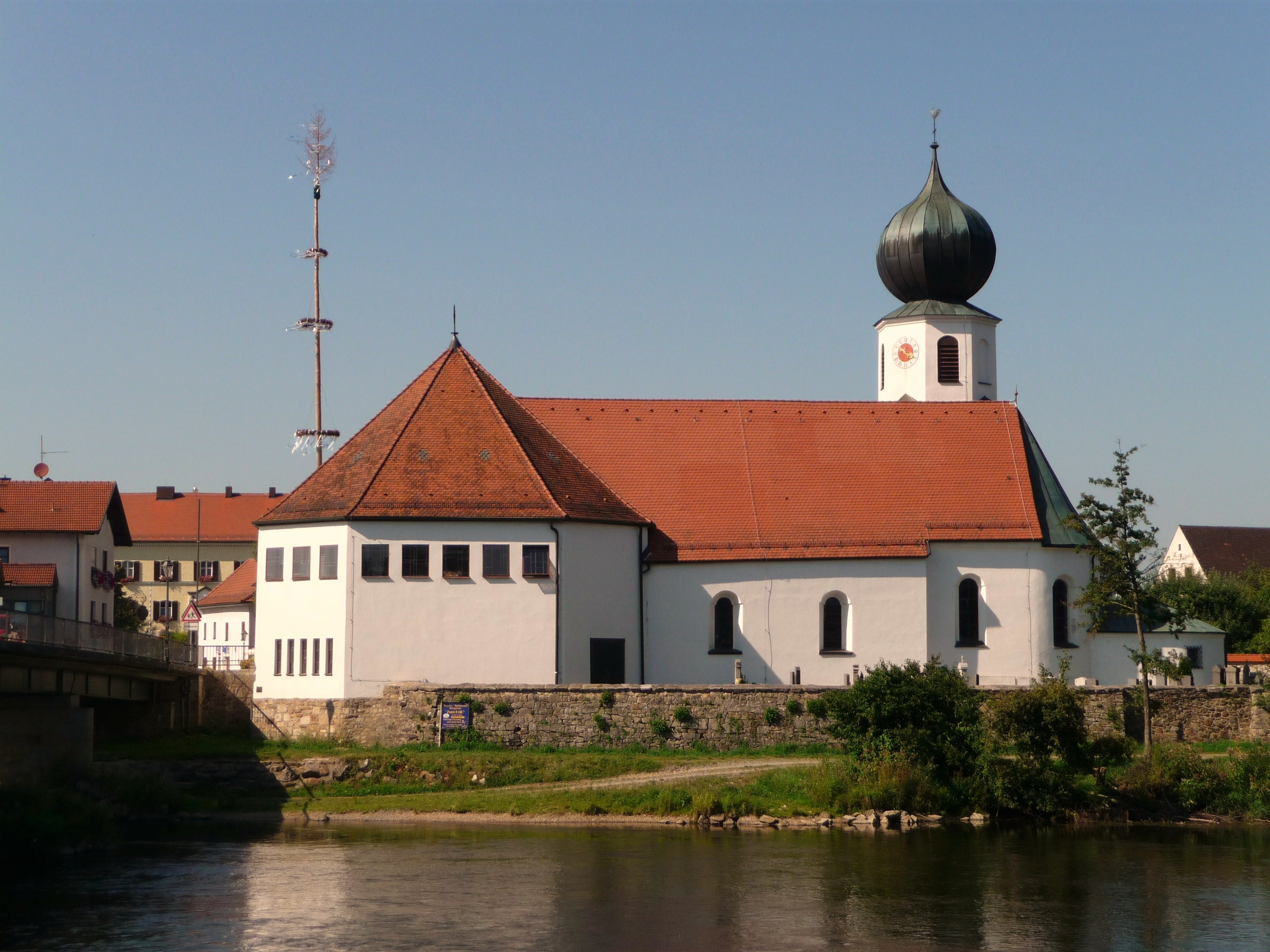
- Parish church of Saints Peter and Paul

- Coat of arms

- Location of Chamerau within Cham district
- Interactive map of Chamerau
- Location within Germany Location within Bavaria
- Coordinates: 49°12′N 12°45′E
- Country: Germany
- State: Bavaria
- Admin. region: Oberpfalz
- District: Cham

Government
  - Mayor (2020–26): Stefan Baumgartner (CSU)

Area
  - Total: 23.4 km^{2} (9.0 sq mi)
- Elevation: 375 m (1,230 ft)

Population (2025-12-31)
  - Total: 2,500
  - Density: 110/km^{2} (280/sq mi)
- Time zone: UTC+01:00 (CET)
  - Summer (DST): UTC+02:00 (CEST)
- Postal codes: 93466
- Dialling codes: 0 99 44
- Vehicle registration: CHA
- Website: www.chamerau.de

Chamerau (German pronunciation: [ˈkaːməʁaʊ]) is a municipality in the district of Cham in Bavaria in Germany.
