= Traitsching =

- Municipality
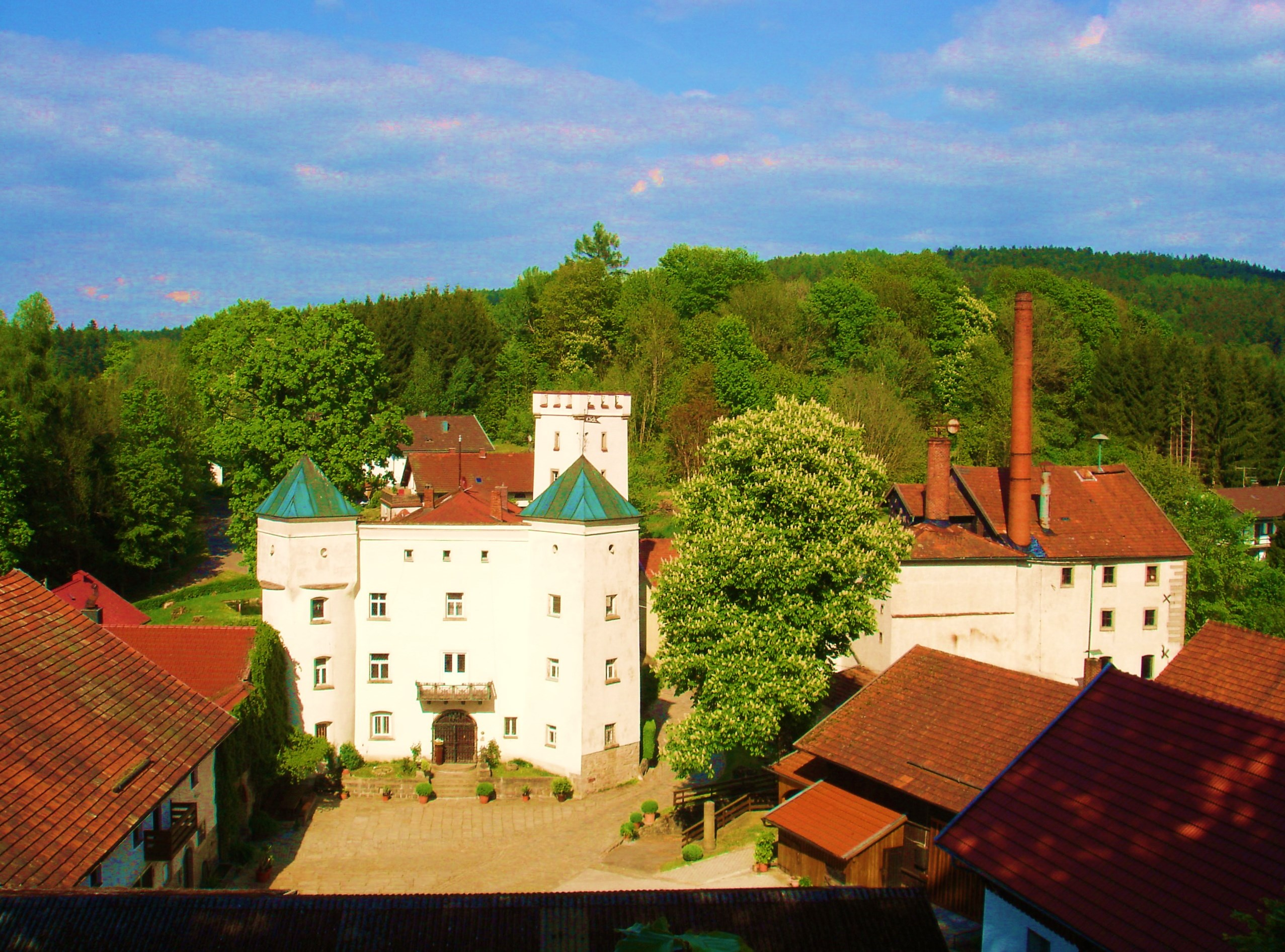
- Sattelpeilnstein Castle and Brewery

- Coat of arms

- Location of Traitsching within Cham district
- Interactive map of Traitsching
- Location within Germany Location within Bavaria
- Coordinates: 49°9′N 12°39′E
- Country: Germany
- State: Bavaria
- Admin. region: Oberpfalz
- District: Cham

Government
  - Mayor (2020–26): Josef Marchl (CSU)

Area
  - Total: 45.4 km^{2} (17.5 sq mi)
- Elevation: 416 m (1,365 ft)

Population (2025-12-31)
  - Total: 4,229
  - Density: 93.1/km^{2} (241/sq mi)
- Time zone: UTC+01:00 (CET)
  - Summer (DST): UTC+02:00 (CEST)
- Postal codes: 93455
- Dialling codes: 0 99 74
- Vehicle registration: CHA
- Website: www.traitsching.de

Traitsching (German pronunciation: [ˈtʁaɪtʃɪŋ]) is a municipality in the district of Cham in Bavaria in Germany. The municipality consists of over 20 villages and numerous hamlets. The largest villages are the eponymous Traitsching (approx. 1400 inhabitants) and Sattelpeilnstein (1000 inhabitants), Loifling (500) and Wilting (500).
