= Hohenwarth =

Hohenwarth (District of Cham)
- Municipality
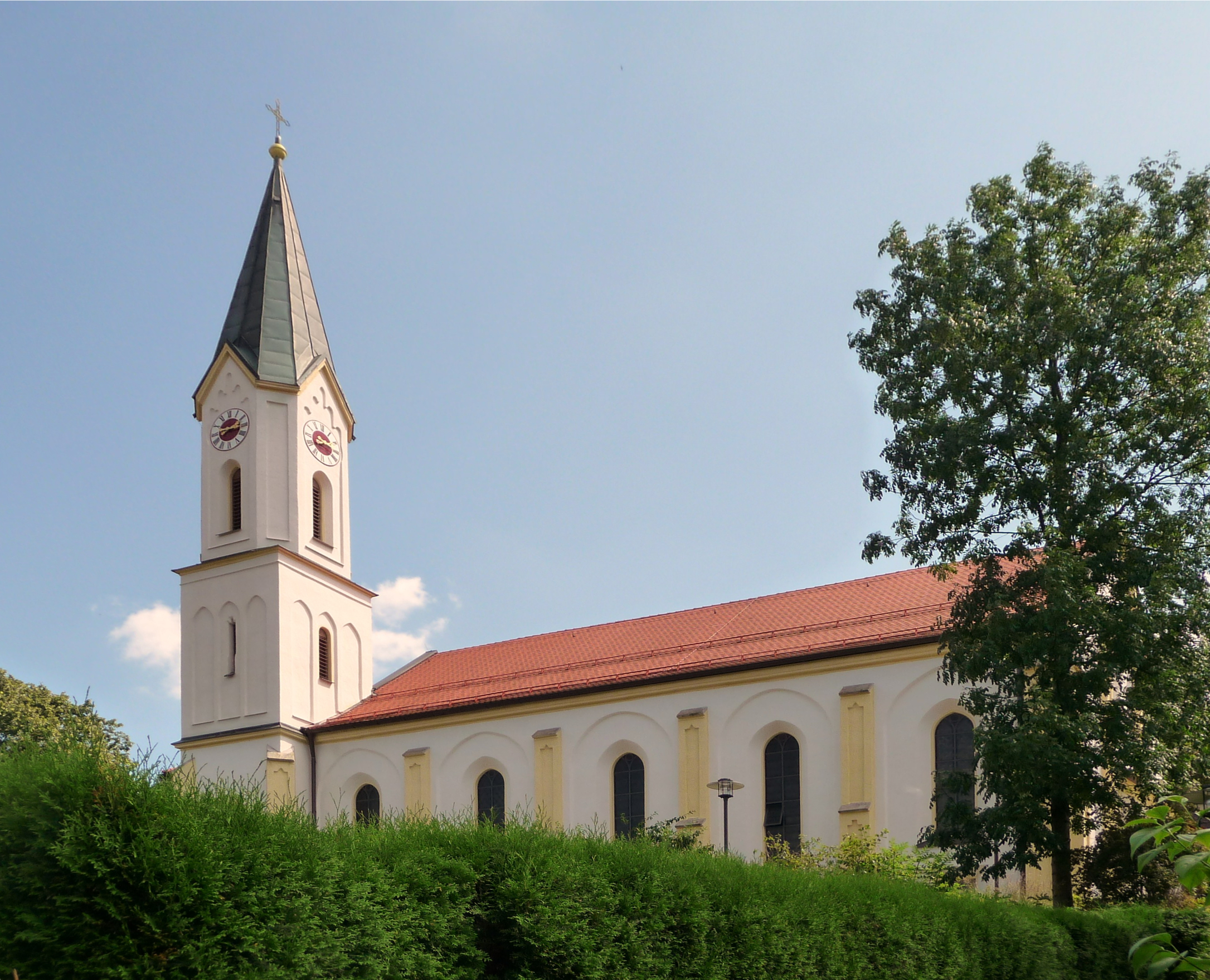
- Saint John Church

- Coat of arms

- Location of Hohenwarth (District of Cham) within Cham district
- Interactive map of Hohenwarth (District of Cham)
- Location within Germany Location within Bavaria
- Coordinates: 49°12′N 12°56′E
- Country: Germany
- State: Bavaria
- Admin. region: Oberpfalz
- District: Cham

Government
  - Mayor (2020–26): Xaver Gmach

Area
  - Total: 24.22 km^{2} (9.35 sq mi)
- Elevation: 507 m (1,663 ft)

Population (2025-12-31)
  - Total: 1,890
  - Density: 78.0/km^{2} (202/sq mi)
- Time zone: UTC+01:00 (CET)
  - Summer (DST): UTC+02:00 (CEST)
- Postal codes: 93480
- Dialling codes: 0 99 46
- Vehicle registration: CHA
- Website: www.hohenwarth.de

Hohenwarth (German pronunciation: [ˈhoːənvaʁt]) is a municipality in the district of Cham in Bavaria in Germany.
