= Zell, Upper Palatinate =

Zell
- Municipality
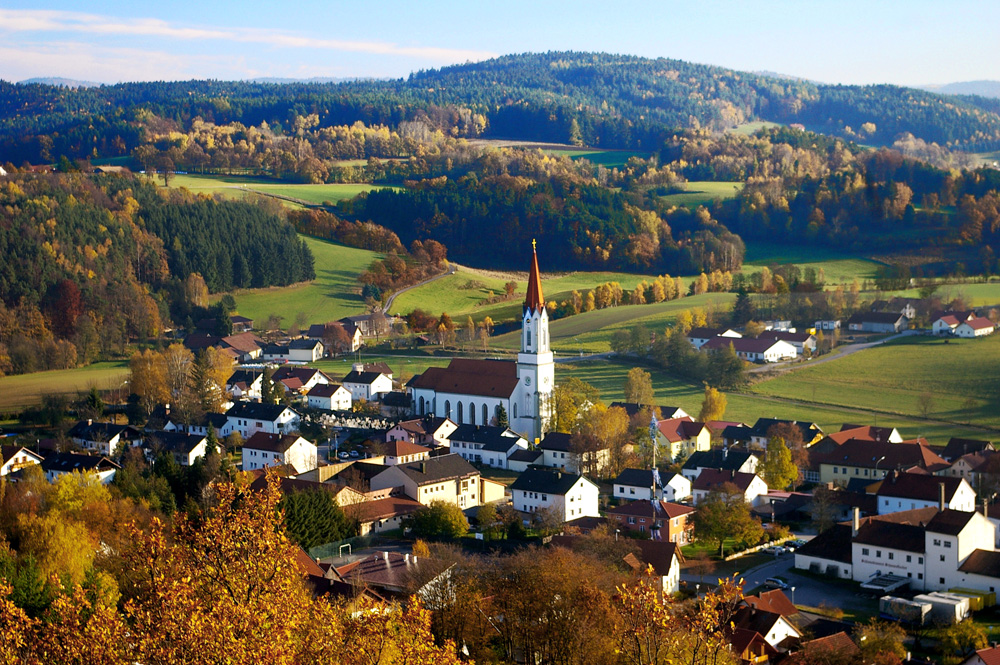
- Zell

- Coat of arms

- Location of Zell within Cham district
- Interactive map of Zell
- Location within Germany Location within Bavaria
- Coordinates: 49°08′40″N 12°24′41″E
- Country: Germany
- State: Bavaria
- Admin. region: Oberpfalz
- District: Cham
- Municipal assoc.: Wald

Government
  - Mayor (2020–26): Thomas Schwarzfischer (CSU)

Area
  - Total: 32.95 km^{2} (12.72 sq mi)
- Elevation: 486 m (1,594 ft)

Population (2025-12-31)
  - Total: 1,826
  - Density: 55.42/km^{2} (143.5/sq mi)
- Time zone: UTC+01:00 (CET)
  - Summer (DST): UTC+02:00 (CEST)
- Postal codes: 93199
- Dialling codes: 0 94 68
- Vehicle registration: CHA
- Website: www.gemeinde-zell.de

Zell (German pronunciation: [tsɛl]) is a municipality in the district of Cham in Bavaria in Germany.
