= Weiding =

- Municipality
- Coat of arms

- Location of Weiding within Cham district
- Interactive map of Weiding
- Location within Germany Location within Bavaria
- Coordinates: 49°16′N 12°46′E
- Country: Germany
- State: Bavaria
- Admin. region: Oberpfalz
- District: Cham
- Municipal assoc.: Weiding
- Subdivisions: 14 Ortsteile

Government
  - Mayor (2020–26): Daniel Paul (FW)

Area
  - Total: 28.16 km^{2} (10.87 sq mi)
- Elevation: 380 m (1,250 ft)

Population (2025-12-31)
  - Total: 2,426
  - Density: 86.15/km^{2} (223.1/sq mi)
- Time zone: UTC+01:00 (CET)
  - Summer (DST): UTC+02:00 (CEST)
- Postal codes: 93495
- Dialling codes: 09977
- Vehicle registration: CHA
- Website: www.weiding.de

Weiding (German pronunciation: [ˈvaɪdɪŋ]) is a municipality in the district of Cham in Bavaria in Germany.
