= Waffenbrunn =

- Municipality
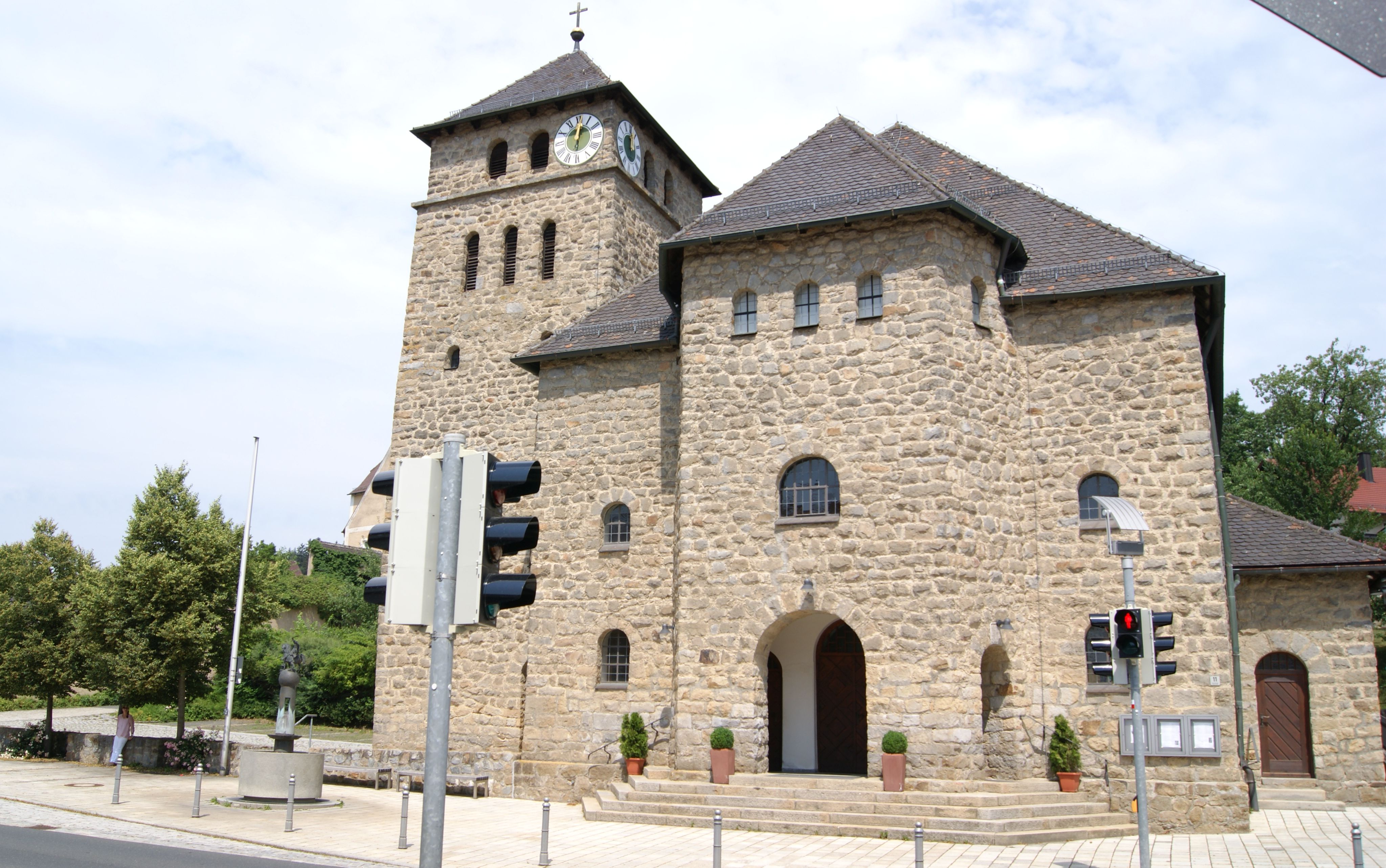
- Assumption of the Virgin Mary Church

- Coat of arms

- Location of Waffenbrunn within Cham district
- Interactive map of Waffenbrunn
- Location within Germany Location within Bavaria
- Coordinates: 49°16′N 12°40′E
- Country: Germany
- State: Bavaria
- Admin. region: Oberpfalz
- District: Cham

Government
  - Mayor (2020–26): Josef Ederer

Area
  - Total: 25.16 km^{2} (9.71 sq mi)
- Elevation: 396 m (1,299 ft)

Population (2025-12-31)
  - Total: 2,028
  - Density: 80.60/km^{2} (208.8/sq mi)
- Time zone: UTC+01:00 (CET)
  - Summer (DST): UTC+02:00 (CEST)
- Postal codes: 93494
- Dialling codes: 0 99 71
- Vehicle registration: CHA
- Website: www.waffenbrunn.de

Waffenbrunn is a municipality in the district of Cham in Bavaria in Germany.
