= Pemfling =

- Municipality
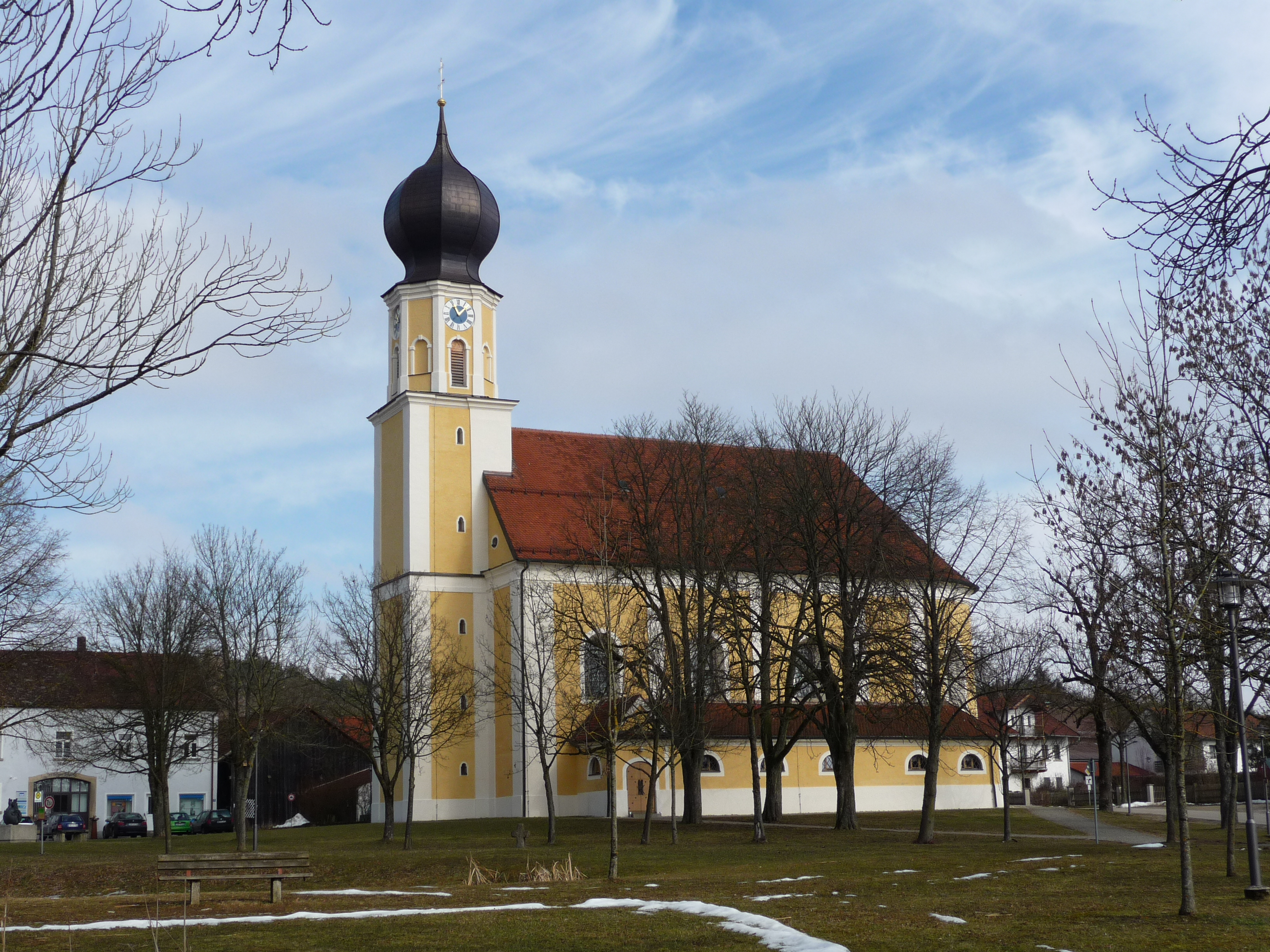
- Saint Andrew Church

- Coat of arms

- Location of Pemfling within Cham district
- Interactive map of Pemfling
- Location within Germany Location within Bavaria
- Coordinates: 49°16′N 12°37′E
- Country: Germany
- State: Bavaria
- Admin. region: Oberpfalz
- District: Cham

Government
  - Mayor (2020–26): Franz Haberl (CSU)

Area
  - Total: 44.53 km^{2} (17.19 sq mi)
- Elevation: 431 m (1,414 ft)

Population (2025-12-31)
  - Total: 2,144
  - Density: 48.15/km^{2} (124.7/sq mi)
- Time zone: UTC+01:00 (CET)
  - Summer (DST): UTC+02:00 (CEST)
- Postal codes: 93482
- Dialling codes: 0 99 71
- Vehicle registration: CHA
- Website: www.pemfling.de

Pemfling is a municipality in the district of Cham in Bavaria in Germany.
