= Runding =

- Municipality
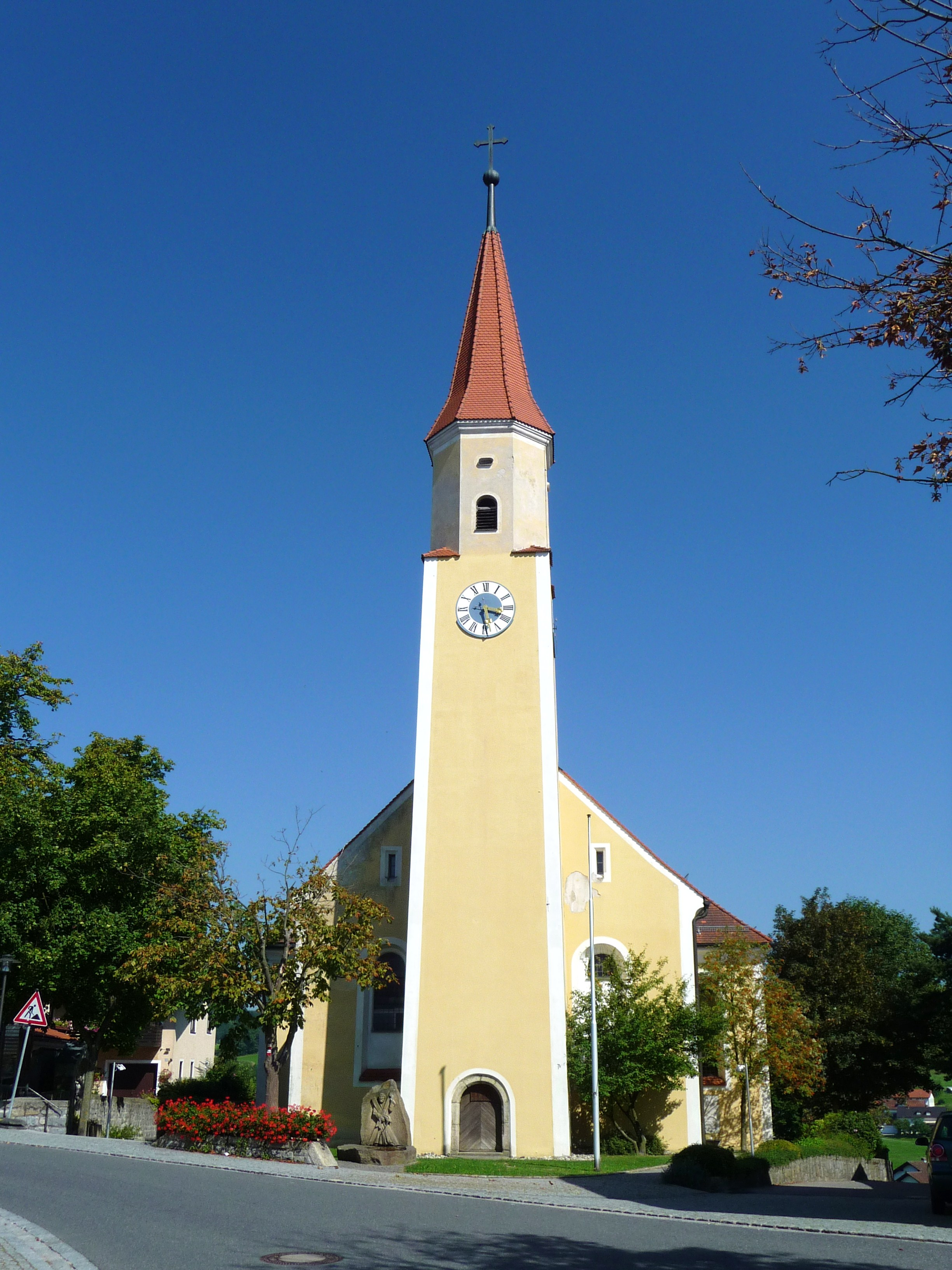
- The old Church of Saint Andrew

- Coat of arms

- Location of Runding within Cham district
- Interactive map of Runding
- Location within Germany Location within Bavaria
- Coordinates: 49°13′N 12°46′E
- Country: Germany
- State: Bavaria
- Admin. region: Oberpfalz
- District: Cham

Government
  - Mayor (2020–26): Franz Kopp (SPD)

Area
  - Total: 20.94 km^{2} (8.08 sq mi)
- Elevation: 484 m (1,588 ft)

Population (2025-12-31)
  - Total: 2,225
  - Density: 106.3/km^{2} (275.2/sq mi)
- Time zone: UTC+01:00 (CET)
  - Summer (DST): UTC+02:00 (CEST)
- Postal codes: 93486
- Dialling codes: 09971
- Vehicle registration: CHA
- Website: www.runding.de

Runding (German pronunciation: [ˈʁʊndɪŋ]) is a municipality in the district of Cham in Bavaria in Germany.
