= Wald (Verwaltungsgemeinschaft) =

- Verwaltungsgemeinschaft
- Location of Wald within Cham district
- Interactive map of Wald
- Location within Germany Location within Bavaria
- Coordinates: 49°09′N 12°21′E
- Country: Germany
- State: Bavaria
- Admin. region: Upper Palatinate
- District: Cham
- Seat: Wald
- Subdivisions: 2 municipalities

Area
  - Total: 70.74 km^{2} (27.31 sq mi)

Population (2025-12-31)
  - Total: 4,853
  - Density: 68.60/km^{2} (177.7/sq mi)
- Time zone: UTC+01:00 (CET)
  - Summer (DST): UTC+02:00 (CEST)
- Website: www.vg-wald.de

Wald is a Verwaltungsgemeinschaft (municipal association) in the district of Cham in Bavaria, Germany. Its seat is in Wald. It consists of the following municipalities:

1. Wald
2. Zell
