= Zandt =

- Municipality
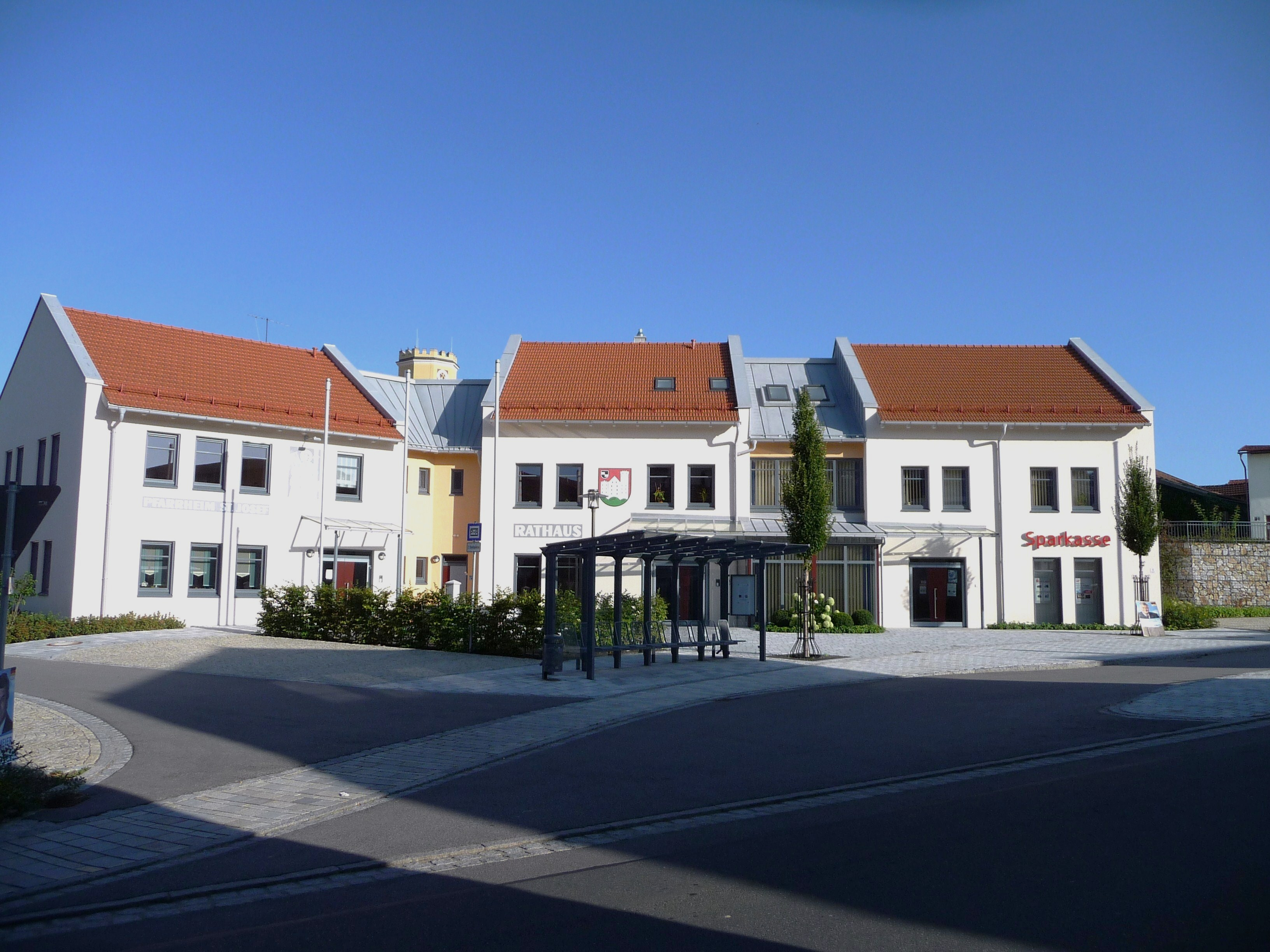
- Town hall

- Coat of arms

- Location of Zandt within Cham district
- Interactive map of Zandt
- Location within Germany Location within Bavaria
- Coordinates: 49°9′N 12°44′E
- Country: Germany
- State: Bavaria
- Admin. region: Oberpfalz
- District: Cham
- Subdivisions: 2 Ortsteile

Government
  - Mayor (2020–26): Hans-Jürgen Laumer

Area
  - Total: 21.61 km^{2} (8.34 sq mi)
- Elevation: 472 m (1,549 ft)

Population (2025-12-31)
  - Total: 2,057
  - Density: 95.19/km^{2} (246.5/sq mi)
- Time zone: UTC+01:00 (CET)
  - Summer (DST): UTC+02:00 (CEST)
- Postal codes: 93499
- Dialling codes: 0 99 44
- Vehicle registration: CHA
- Website: www.gemeinde-zandt.de

Zandt (German pronunciation: [tsant]) is a municipality in the district of Cham in Bavaria in Germany.
