= Grafenwiesen =

- Municipality
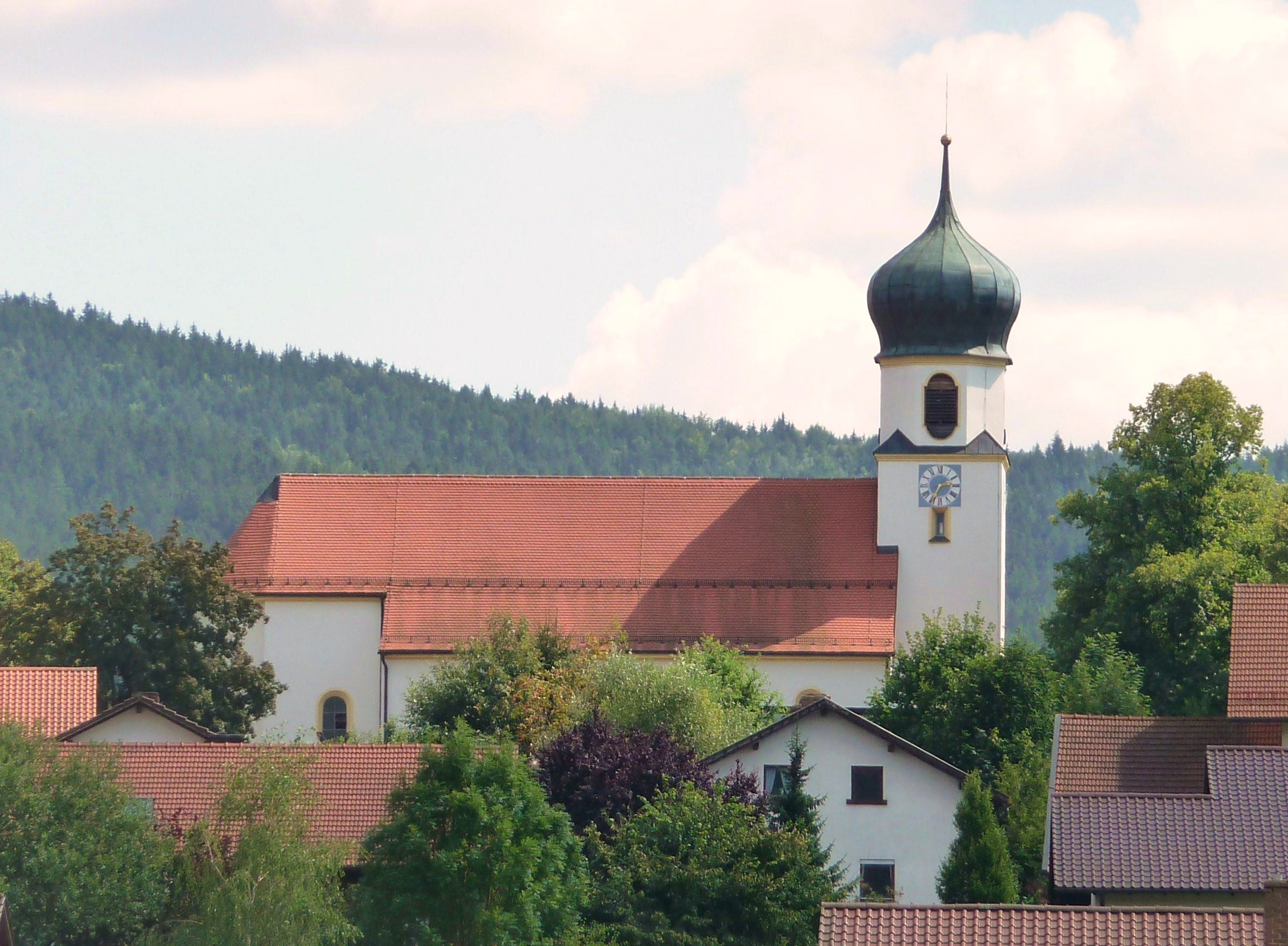
- Parish church

- Coat of arms

- Location of Grafenwiesen within Cham district
- Interactive map of Grafenwiesen
- Location within Germany Location within Bavaria
- Coordinates: 49°12′N 12°52′E
- Country: Germany
- State: Bavaria
- Admin. region: Oberpfalz
- District: Cham

Government
  - Mayor (2023–29): Sabine Steinlechner

Area
  - Total: 10.23 km^{2} (3.95 sq mi)
- Elevation: 439 m (1,440 ft)

Population (2025-12-31)
  - Total: 1,478
  - Density: 144.5/km^{2} (374.2/sq mi)
- Time zone: UTC+01:00 (CET)
  - Summer (DST): UTC+02:00 (CEST)
- Postal codes: 93479
- Dialling codes: 0 99 41
- Vehicle registration: CHA
- Website: www.grafenwiesen.de

Grafenwiesen is a municipality in the district of Cham in Bavaria in Germany.
