= Willmering =

- Municipality
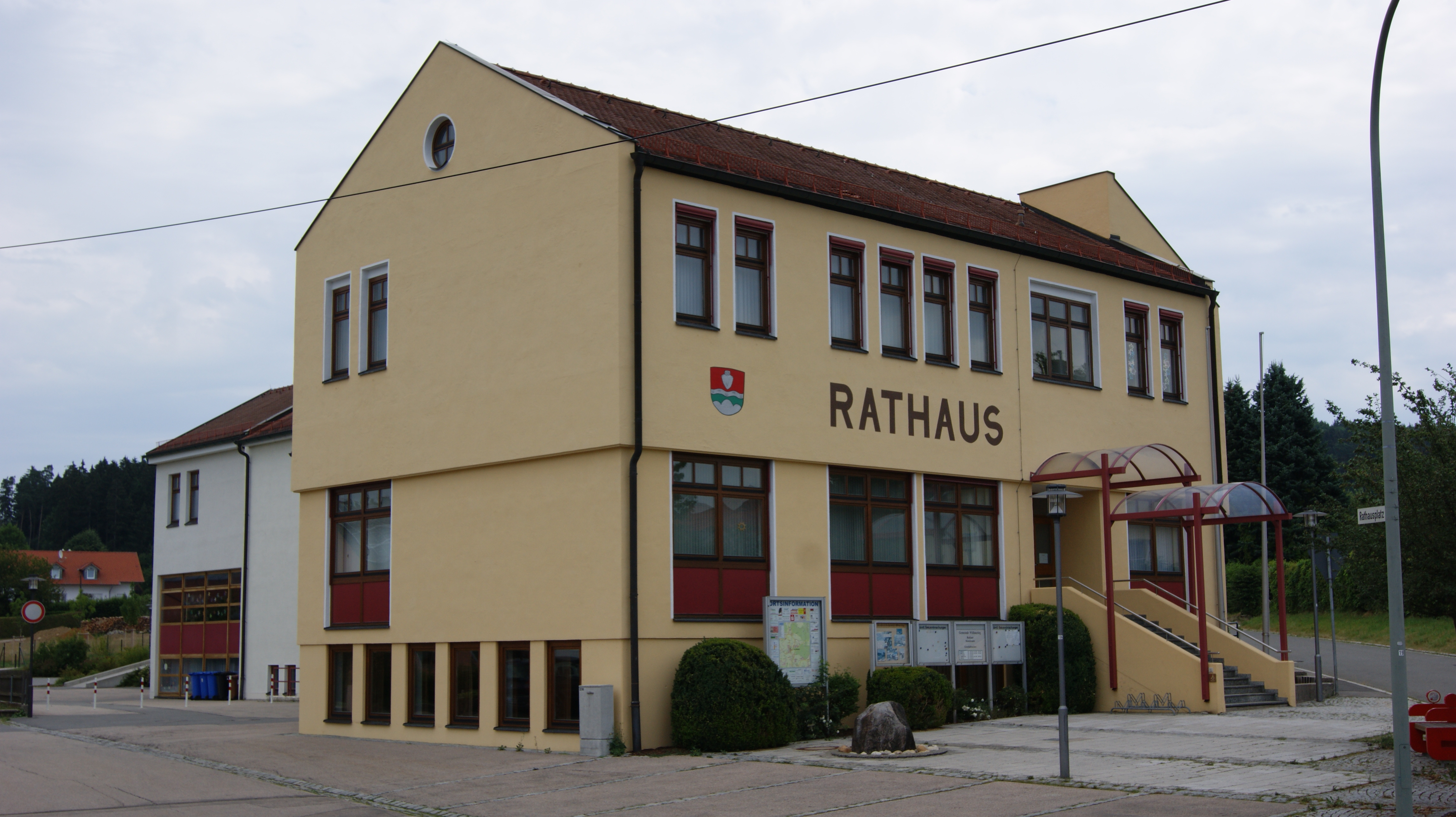
- Town hall

- Coat of arms

- Location of Willmering within Cham district
- Interactive map of Willmering
- Location within Germany Location within Bavaria
- Coordinates: 49°15′N 12°40′E
- Country: Germany
- State: Bavaria
- Admin. region: Oberpfalz
- District: Cham

Government
  - Mayor (2020–26): Hans Eichstetter

Area
  - Total: 10.3 km^{2} (4.0 sq mi)
- Elevation: 375 m (1,230 ft)

Population (2025-12-31)
  - Total: 2,008
  - Density: 195/km^{2} (505/sq mi)
- Time zone: UTC+01:00 (CET)
  - Summer (DST): UTC+02:00 (CEST)
- Postal codes: 93497
- Dialling codes: 0 99 71
- Vehicle registration: CHA
- Website: www.willmering.de

Wilmering (German pronunciation: [ˈvɪlməʁɪŋ]) is a municipality in the district of Cham in Bavaria in Germany.
