= Cham (district) =

Coordinates: 49°15′N 12°40′E

- District
- Flag Coat of arms
- Country: Germany
- State: Bavaria
- Adm. region: Upper Palatinate
- Capital: Cham

Government
  - District admin.: Franz Löffler (CSU)

Area
  - Total: 1,510 km^{2} (580 sq mi)

Population (31 December 2025)
  - Total: 128,141
  - Density: 84.9/km^{2} (220/sq mi)
- Time zone: UTC+01:00 (CET)
  - Summer (DST): UTC+02:00 (CEST)
- Vehicle registration: CHA, KÖZ, ROD, WÜM
- Website: landkreis-cham.de

Cham (German pronunciation: [kaːm]) is a Landkreis (district) in Bavaria, Germany. It is bounded by (from the south and clockwise) the districts of Regen, Straubing-Bogen, Regensburg and Schwandorf and by the Czech Plzeň Region.

== History ==
The first historical date in the regional history is the year 748, when the bishop of Regensburg ordered the foundation of a monastery in the sparsely populated region. About 100 years later, the royal castle of Cham was built and became a summer residence for the Holy Roman Emperors. The region was called Campriche or Mark Cham. In 1204, the Mark Cham became subject to Bavaria, in 1352 to the Electorate of the Palatinate and in the 17th century back to Bavaria. Nowadays, Cham still enjoys the laid-back lifestyle from the days of yore. Many projects have been initiated to give this area an impetus to grow, yet in spite of this, it is still one of the least-populated regions in Germany.

== Geography ==
The district is located in the northern parts of the Bavarian Forest. It is situated within the borders of the Upper Bavarian Forest Nature Park. The highest mountain is the Großer Arber at 1,439 m, located near the Germany–Czech Republic border. The Regen river enters the district in the southeast and leaves to the west; most of the settled places are situated along this river and its main tributary, the Chamb coming from the Czech border.

== Coat of arms ==
The upper part of the arms is occupied by the blue and white checkered pattern of Bavaria. The church of Chammünster (today belonging to the town of Cham), which was built in 748 within a famous monastery, is displayed below.

== Towns and municipalities ==
Clickable map of towns and municipalities in the district

Towns
1. Bad Kötzting
2. Cham
3. Furth im Wald
4. Roding
5. Rötz
6. Waldmünchen

Märkte

1. Eschlkam
2. Lam
3. Neukirchen beim Heiligen Blut
Municipalities
1. Arnschwang
2. Arrach
3. Blaibach
4. Chamerau
5. Grafenwiesen
6. Hohenwarth
7. Lohberg
8. Miltach
9. Pemfling

10. Rimbach
11. Runding
12. Schönthal
13. Schorndorf
14. Traitsching
15. Waffenbrunn
16. Willmering
17. Zandt

Verwaltungsgemeinschaften
1. Falkenstein; 1. Falkenstein^{1,2}; 2. Michelsneukirchen; 3. Rettenbach; 2. Stamsried; 1. Pösing; 2. Stamsried^{1,2}	3. Tiefenbach; 1. Tiefenbach^{1}; 2. Treffelstein; 4. Wald; 1. Wald^{1}; 2. Zell	5. Walderbach; 1. Reichenbach; 2. Walderbach^{1}; 6. Weiding; 1. Gleißenberg; 2. Weiding^{1}
^{1}seat of the Verwaltungsgemeinschaft; ^{2}Markt
