= Tiefenbach, Upper Palatinate =

Tiefenbach
- Municipality
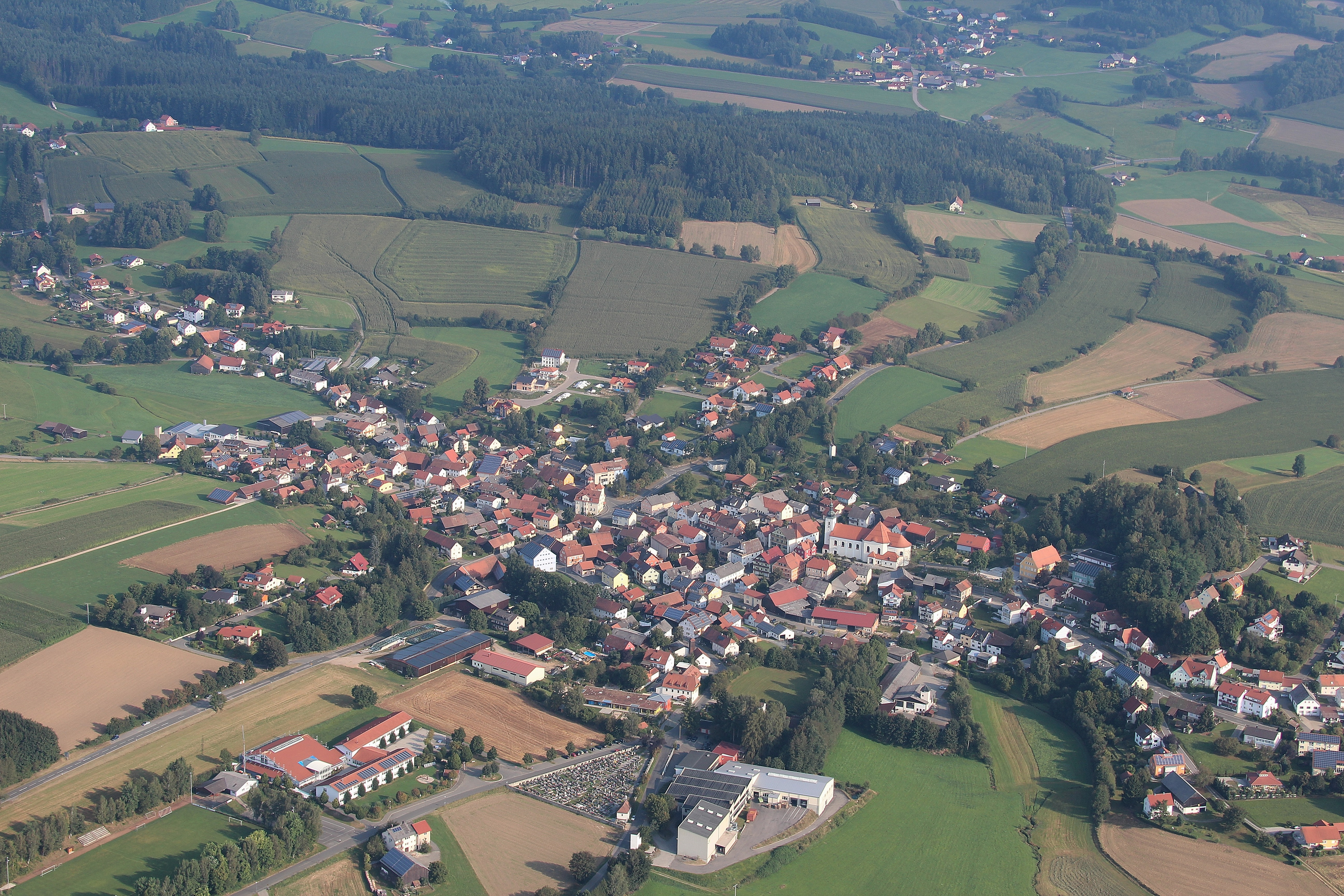
- Aerial view

- Coat of arms

- Location of Tiefenbach within Cham district
- Interactive map of Tiefenbach
- Location within Germany Location within Bavaria
- Coordinates: 49°26′N 12°35′E
- Country: Germany
- State: Bavaria
- Admin. region: Oberpfalz
- District: Cham

Government
  - Mayor (2020–26): Ludwig Prögler (CSU)

Area
  - Total: 45.84 km^{2} (17.70 sq mi)
- Elevation: 527 m (1,729 ft)

Population (2025-12-31)
  - Total: 1,842
  - Density: 40.18/km^{2} (104.1/sq mi)
- Time zone: UTC+01:00 (CET)
  - Summer (DST): UTC+02:00 (CEST)
- Postal codes: 93464
- Dialling codes: 0 96 73
- Vehicle registration: CHA
- Website: www.tiefenbach-opf.de

Tiefenbach (German pronunciation: [ˈtiːfn̩bax]) is a municipality in the district of Cham in Bavaria in Germany.
