= Maximilian Schmidt =

German novelist and humorist

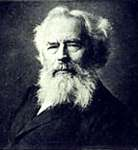
- Called “Waldschmidt”

Maximilian Schmidt (25 February 1832 Eschlkam – 8 December 1919 Munich) was a German novelist and humorist.

== Biography ==
He served with distinction in the Bavarian army from 1850 to 1872, when he retired and settled at Munich to devote himself exclusively to his literary work.

Among the best of his numerous tales and novels, dealing vividly and realistically with the people and scenery of the Bavarian Mountains, should be mentioned: Volkserzählungen aus dem Bayrischen Wald (Folktales from the Bavarian Woods, 1863-1869); Der Schutzgeist von Oberammergau (1880); 's Austragsstüberl; Der Georgithaler (1882); Die Fischerrosl von St. Heinrich (1884); Der Musikant von Tegernsee (The musician of Tegernsee, 1886); 's Lisel von Ammersee (1887); Die Künischen Freibauern (1895). Gradually, these productions fell off in literary merit, as the author became more and more prolific. Lasting success attended his Humoresken (1892), the collection of dialect poems Altboarisch (1884), and several popular plays, dramatized from his novels.

He also published the autobiography Meine Wanderung durch 70 Jahre (1902). His Gesammelte Werke appeared in popular edition of 34 vols. (Reutlingen, 1893–98).
