= Treffelstein =

- Municipality
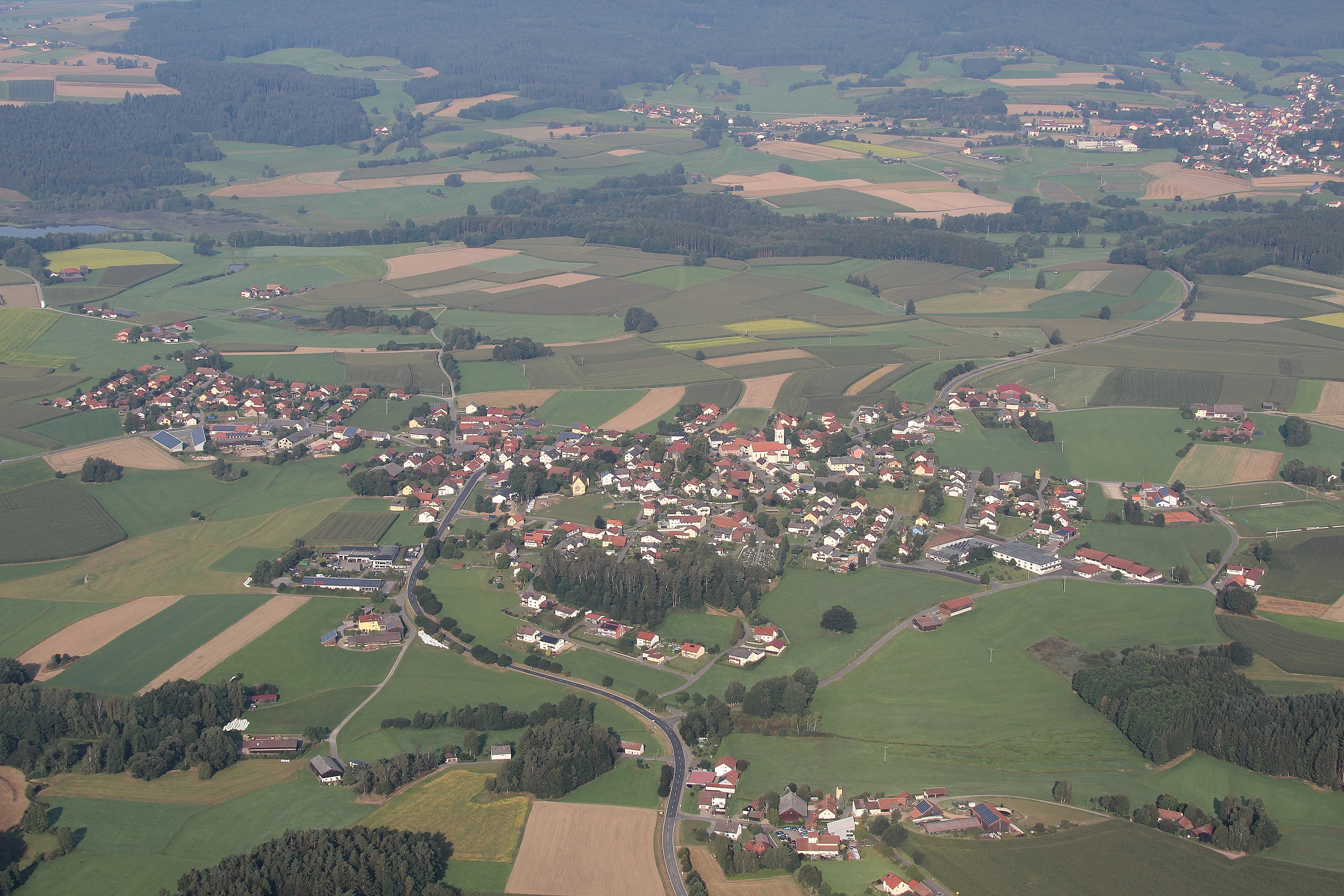
- Aerial view

- Coat of arms

- Location of Treffelstein within Cham district
- Interactive map of Treffelstein
- Location within Germany Location within Bavaria
- Coordinates: 49°25′N 12°37′E
- Country: Germany
- State: Bavaria
- Admin. region: Oberpfalz
- District: Cham

Government
  - Mayor (2020–26): Helmut Heumann (CSU)

Area
  - Total: 20.88 km^{2} (8.06 sq mi)
- Elevation: 524 m (1,719 ft)

Population (2025-12-31)
  - Total: 952
  - Density: 45.6/km^{2} (118/sq mi)
- Time zone: UTC+01:00 (CET)
  - Summer (DST): UTC+02:00 (CEST)
- Postal codes: 93492
- Dialling codes: 0 96 73
- Vehicle registration: CHA
- Website: www.treffelstein.de

Treffelstein is a municipality in the district of Cham in Bavaria in Germany.
