= Rötz =

- Town
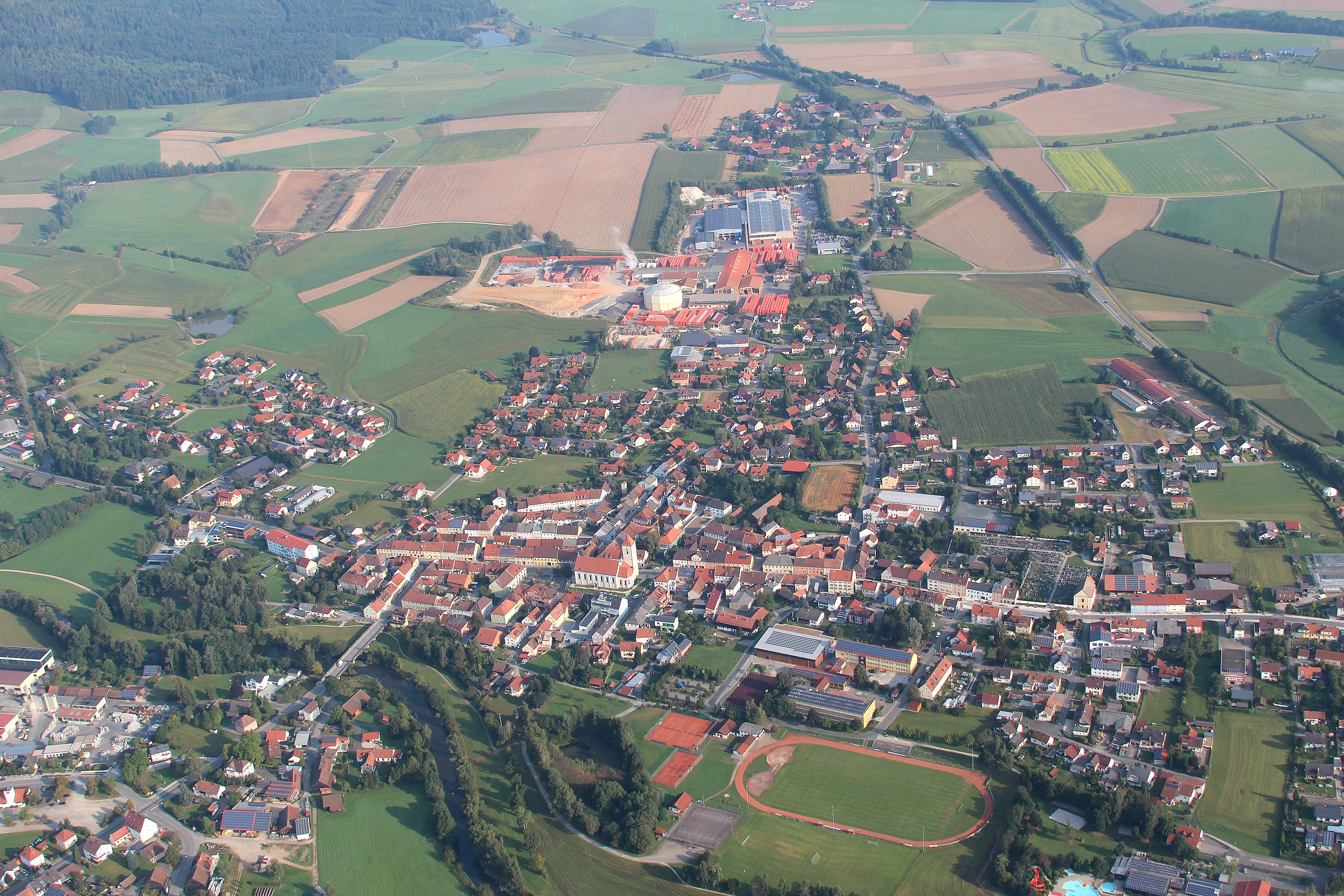
- Aerial view

- Coat of arms

- Location of Rötz within Cham district
- Interactive map of Rötz
- Location within Germany Location within Bavaria
- Coordinates: 49°21′N 12°31′E
- Country: Germany
- State: Bavaria
- Admin. region: Oberpfalz
- District: Cham

Government
  - Mayor (2020–26): Stefan Spindler

Area
  - Total: 66.68 km^{2} (25.75 sq mi)
- Elevation: 453 m (1,486 ft)

Population (2025-12-31)
  - Total: 3,293
  - Density: 49.39/km^{2} (127.9/sq mi)
- Time zone: UTC+01:00 (CET)
  - Summer (DST): UTC+02:00 (CEST)
- Postal codes: 92444
- Dialling codes: 0 99 76
- Vehicle registration: CHA
- Website: www.roetz.de

Rötz (German pronunciation: [ʁœts]) is a town in the district of Cham, in Bavaria, Germany. It is situated 17 km northwest of Cham, and 30 km east of Schwandorf.
