= Rimbach, Upper Palatinate =

Rimbach (Upper Palatinate)
- Municipality
- Coat of arms

- Location of Rimbach (Upper Palatinate) within Cham district
- Interactive map of Rimbach (Upper Palatinate)
- Location within Germany Location within Bavaria
- Coordinates: 49°13′51″N 12°52′46″E
- Country: Germany
- State: Bavaria
- Admin. region: Oberpfalz
- District: Cham

Government
  - Mayor (2020–26): Heinz Niedermayer (CSU)

Area
  - Total: 24.73 km^{2} (9.55 sq mi)
- Elevation: 488 m (1,601 ft)

Population (2025-12-31)
  - Total: 1,824
  - Density: 73.76/km^{2} (191.0/sq mi)
- Time zone: UTC+01:00 (CET)
  - Summer (DST): UTC+02:00 (CEST)
- Postal codes: 93485
- Dialling codes: 0 99 41
- Vehicle registration: CHA
- Website: www.gemeinde-rimbach.de

Rimbach (German pronunciation: [ˈʁɪmbax]) is a municipality in the district of Cham (district) in the Upper Palatinate in Bavaria in Germany.

Rimbach is a village at the foot of the Hoher Bogen (a seven-peaked mountain ridge in the Northern Bavarian Forest National Park). In the village is the Baroque 'Church of Saint Michael' built in 1719. The church had a major expansion in 1970 but preserved the Baroque carvings on the main altar and side altars. Within the church grounds is the ‘Old Church’, built in 1438 with its carvings and altars. And is still used for small services (it seats about 36 individuals).

This village holds on to the traditional customs and culture of the Bavarian Forest Area. There are many organized groups that maintain the native dress, dancing, songs, and the traditional musical instruments from the area. Every Fall there is a “High Garden Fest”(not a ‘beer tent’ or Om-Pa-Pa Fest) to celebrate these cultural treasures of music and song.

There are numerous hiking trails within this area of the National Forest. One hike is to the castle-ruin property of the Earls Preysing, arena of the Erzählung. This area was the inspiration of “The Maiden of Lichtenegg" by the forest poet Maximilian Schmidt. This castle-ruin was used as a watchtower to protect the area from the advancing Swedes during the 16th century. In late July, an outdoor, annual 'Folk Play' is held at outdoor stage area next to the Ruin that tells the story of "The Maiden of Lichtenegg".

Two other hikes to the top of the mountain are to the antenna area for German TV broadcasting at the peak called Burgstall. This relay station brought broadcast TV to a remote area of German and provided news and educational content to Western Bohemia over the "Iron Curtain" during the Cold War. From this location, one can hike to the other end of the mountain ridge to the peak named Eckstein. It also has a Cold War history, since it was the site of German, French and American Signal Intelligence operations (since closed in the 1990s) that were directed over the Czech Border (3.5 miles to the East).
