= Neukirchen beim Heiligen Blut =

Neukirchen b.Hl.Blut
- Municipality
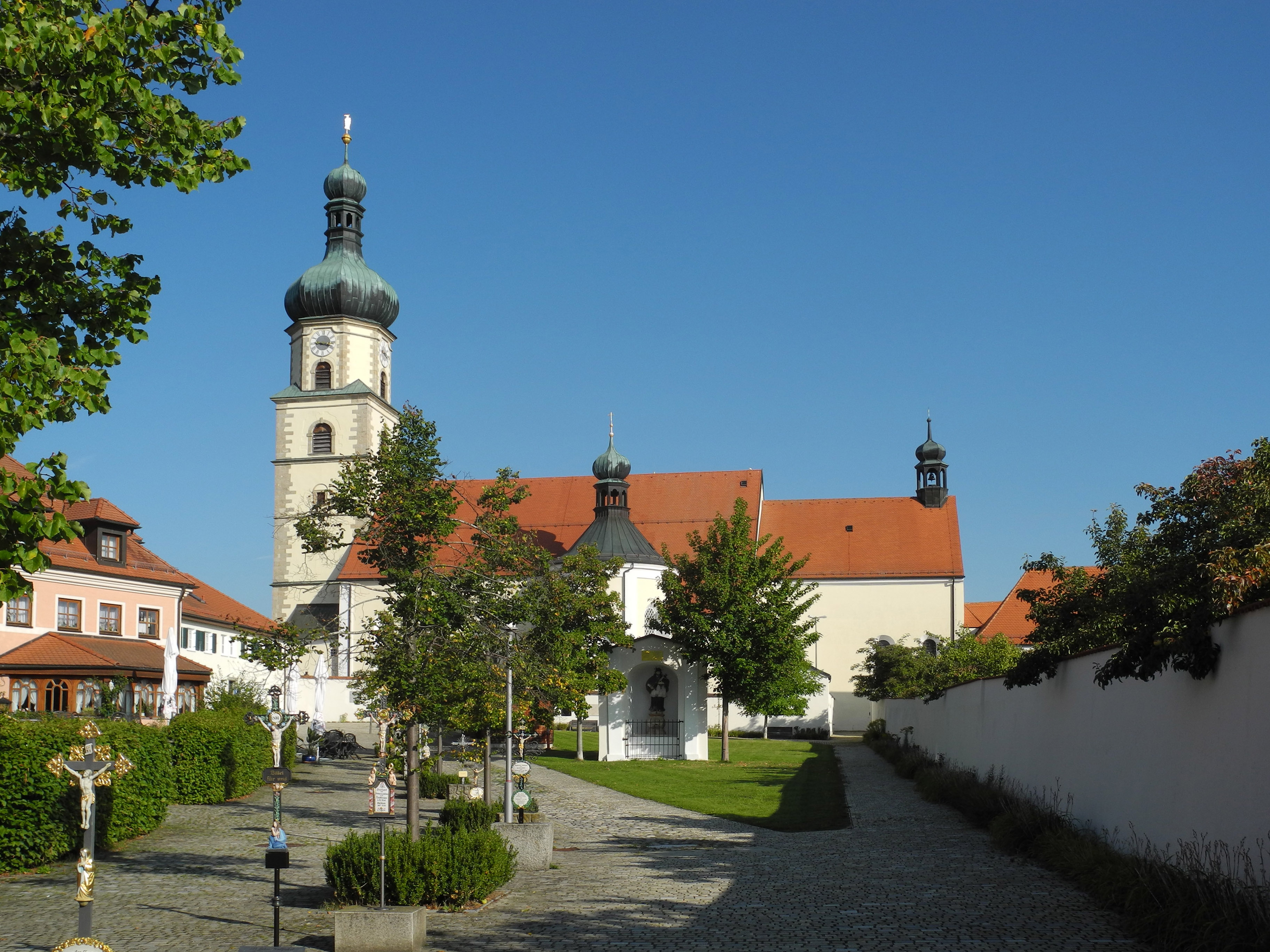
- Pilgrimage Church of the Nativity of the Virgin Mary

- Coat of arms

- Location of Neukirchen b.Hl.Blut within Cham district
- Interactive map of Neukirchen b.Hl.Blut
- Location within Germany Location within Bavaria
- Coordinates: 49°15′33″N 12°58′13″E
- Country: Germany
- State: Bavaria
- Admin. region: Oberpfalz
- District: Cham

Government
  - Mayor (2020–26): Markus Müller (CSU)

Area
  - Total: 59.86 km^{2} (23.11 sq mi)
- Elevation: 485 m (1,591 ft)

Population (2025-12-31)
  - Total: 3,592
  - Density: 60.01/km^{2} (155.4/sq mi)
- Time zone: UTC+01:00 (CET)
  - Summer (DST): UTC+02:00 (CEST)
- Postal codes: 93453
- Dialling codes: 0 99 47
- Vehicle registration: CHA
- Website: www.neukirchen-online.de

Neukirchen beim Heiligen Blut (German pronunciation: [nɔʏˈkɪʁçn̩ baɪm ˈhaɪlɪɡn̩ ˈbluːt], lit. 'New Church near the Holy Blood'; officially Neukirchen b.Hl.Blut) is a municipality in the district of Cham in Bavaria, Germany.

It is the venue of the annual Eisenhart Black Deadlift Championships.
