= Schorndorf, Bavaria =

Schorndorf
- Municipality
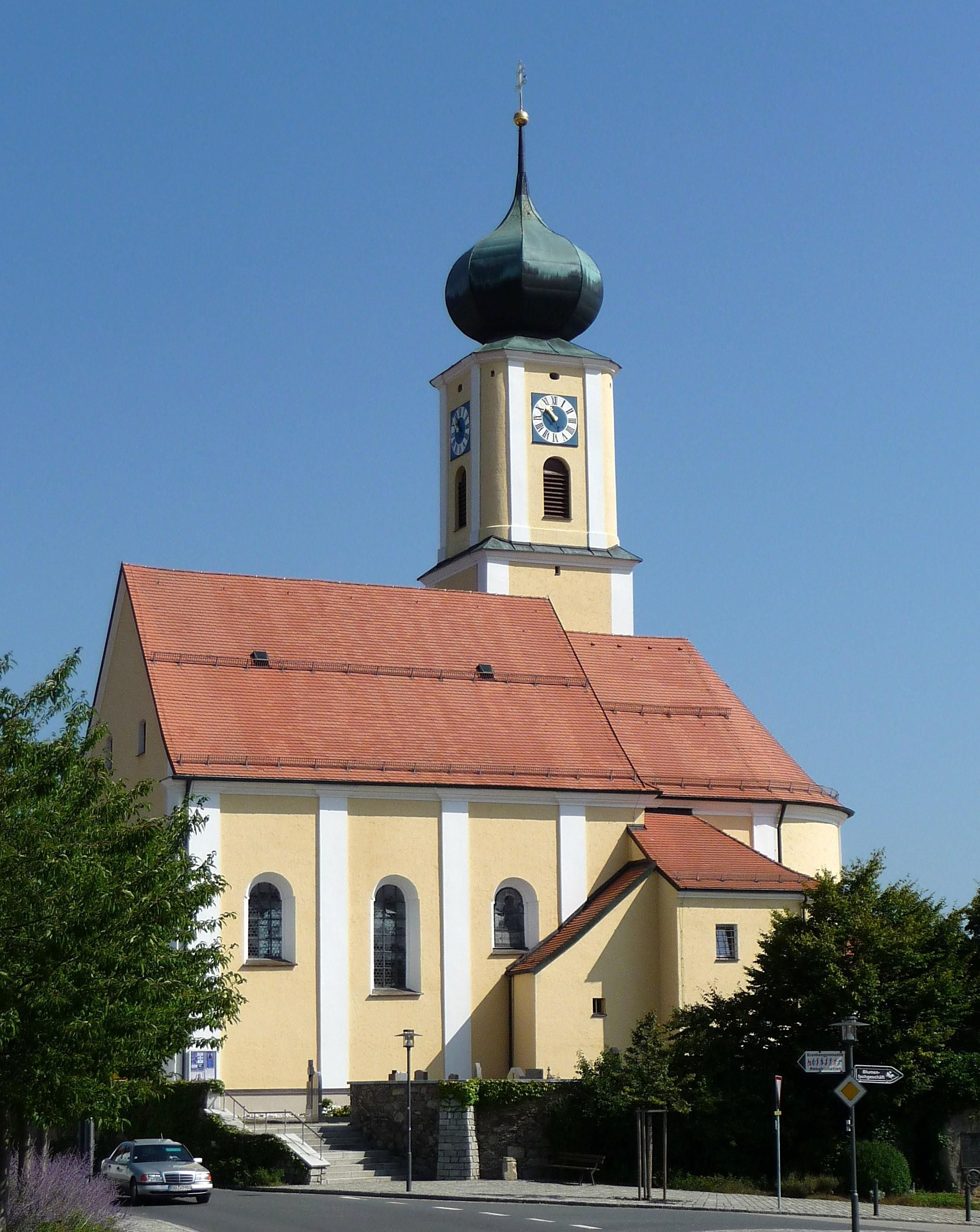
- Immaculate Virgin Mary Church

- Coat of arms

- Location of Schorndorf within Cham district
- Interactive map of Schorndorf
- Location within Germany Location within Bavaria
- Coordinates: 49°10′N 12°36′E
- Country: Germany
- State: Bavaria
- Admin. region: Oberpfalz
- District: Cham

Government
  - Mayor (2020–26): Max Schmaderer

Area
  - Total: 38.54 km^{2} (14.88 sq mi)
- Elevation: 419 m (1,375 ft)

Population (2025-12-31)
  - Total: 3,070
  - Density: 79.7/km^{2} (206/sq mi)
- Time zone: UTC+01:00 (CET)
  - Summer (DST): UTC+02:00 (CEST)
- Postal codes: 93489
- Dialling codes: 0 94 67
- Vehicle registration: CHA
- Website: www.gemeinde-schorndorf.de

Schorndorf (German pronunciation: [ˈʃɔʁnˌdɔʁf]) is a municipality in the district of Cham in Bavaria in Germany.
