= Eschlkam =

- Municipality
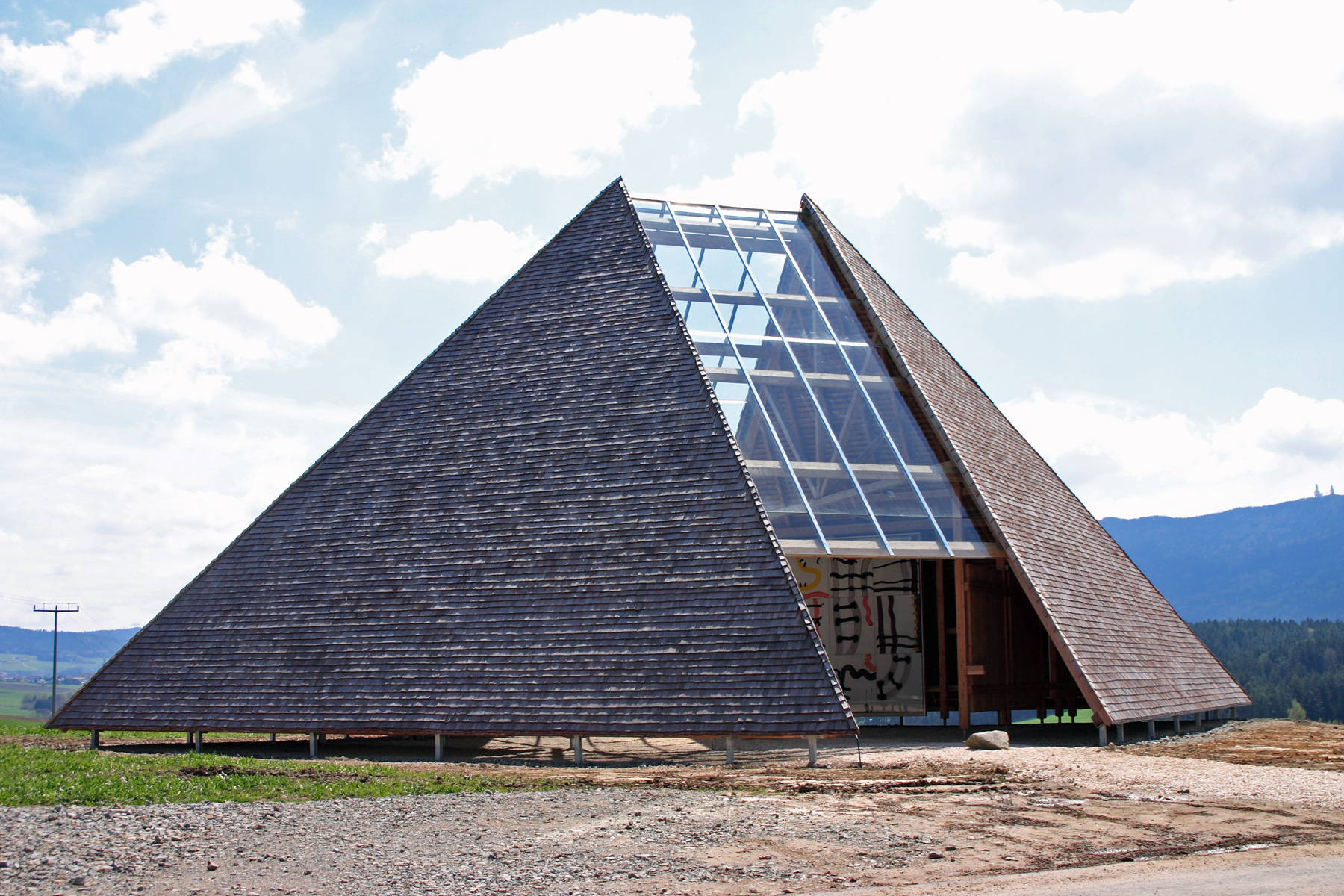
- Art Pavillon

- Coat of arms

- Location of Eschlkam within Cham district
- Interactive map of Eschlkam
- Location within Germany Location within Bavaria
- Coordinates: 49°17′N 12°55′E
- Country: Germany
- State: Bavaria
- Admin. region: Oberpfalz
- District: Cham
- Subdivisions: 24 Ortsteile

Government
  - Mayor (2020–26): Florian Neppl

Area
  - Total: 60.50 km^{2} (23.36 sq mi)
- Elevation: 460 m (1,510 ft)

Population (2025-12-31)
  - Total: 3,294
  - Density: 54.45/km^{2} (141.0/sq mi)
- Time zone: UTC+01:00 (CET)
  - Summer (DST): UTC+02:00 (CEST)
- Postal codes: 93458
- Dialling codes: 09948, 09947 (Warzenried)
- Vehicle registration: CHA
- Website: www.markt-eschlkam.de

Eschlkam is a municipality in the district of Cham in Bavaria in Germany.

The location is in the Bavarian Bohemian Forest area. The town is located about halfway up a mountain, the Hohenbogen. The town has a border crossing over to the Czech Republic. Many of the farmers rent rooms or suites to vacationers in the summertime. Eschlkam is part of the Natur Park Oberer Bayerisher Wald, Nature Park of the Bohemian Forest.
