= Regen (river) =

River in Germany

- The Regen in Miltach

Location
- Country: Germany

Physical characteristics
- Source
  - location: Bohemian Forest
- Mouth
  - location: Danube
  - coordinates: 49°1′35″N 12°6′13″E
- Length: 190.9 km (118.6 mi)
- Basin size: 2,878 km^{2} (1,111 sq mi)
- Discharge
  - average: 40 m^{3}/s (1,400 cu ft/s)

Basin features
- Progression: Danube→ Black Sea

The Regen (German pronunciation: [ˈʁeːɡn̩]; Czech: Řezná) is a river in Bavaria, Germany, and for a short distance in the Czech Republic. It is a left tributary of the Danube, at Regensburg, Germany.

== Etymology ==
The name in German evolved from the name in Latin, but its meaning is unknown. The Romans called the river variously Regana (feminine gender), Reganus (masculine), and Reganum (neuter).

== Geography ==
The source of its main headstream, the Großer Regen ('Great Regen'), is located in the Bohemian Forest on the southern slopes of Mt. Pancíř at 1,060 m (3,480 ft) above sea level, in the territory of Železná Ruda in the Czech Republic. The river crosses the Czech–German border after a few kilometres, at Bayerisch Eisenstein.

At Zwiesel, the Great Regen is joined by the Kleiner Regen ('Little Regen') to form the Schwarzer Regen ('Black Regen'). The Schwarzer Regen flows through Regen and Viechtach, and is joined by the Weißer Regen ('White Regen') in Bad Kötzting. Beyond this confluence, the river is called Regen. The river's total length, including its headstreams, the Great Regen and Black Regen, is 191 kilometres (119 mi). The Kleiner Regen crosses the Frauenau Reservoir.

The Regen Valley forms the main valley crossing the Bavarian Forest; many settlements within the mountains are located along the river. Cities along the Regen river include Cham and Regensburg.

== See also ==
- Regen (city in Germany)
- List of rivers of Bavaria
- List of rivers of the Czech Republic

== Sources ==
- Franz Bogner: Der Regen. Ein Luftbildporträt vom Arber bis Regensburg. Pustet, Regensburg 2007, ISBN 978-3-7917-2054-8 (Bildband).
- Bärbel Kleindorfer-Marx (Hrsg.): Der Regen. Kultur und Natur am Fluss. Buch & Kunstverlag Oberpfalz, Amberg 1996, ISBN 3-924350-56-6.
