= Miltach =

- Municipality
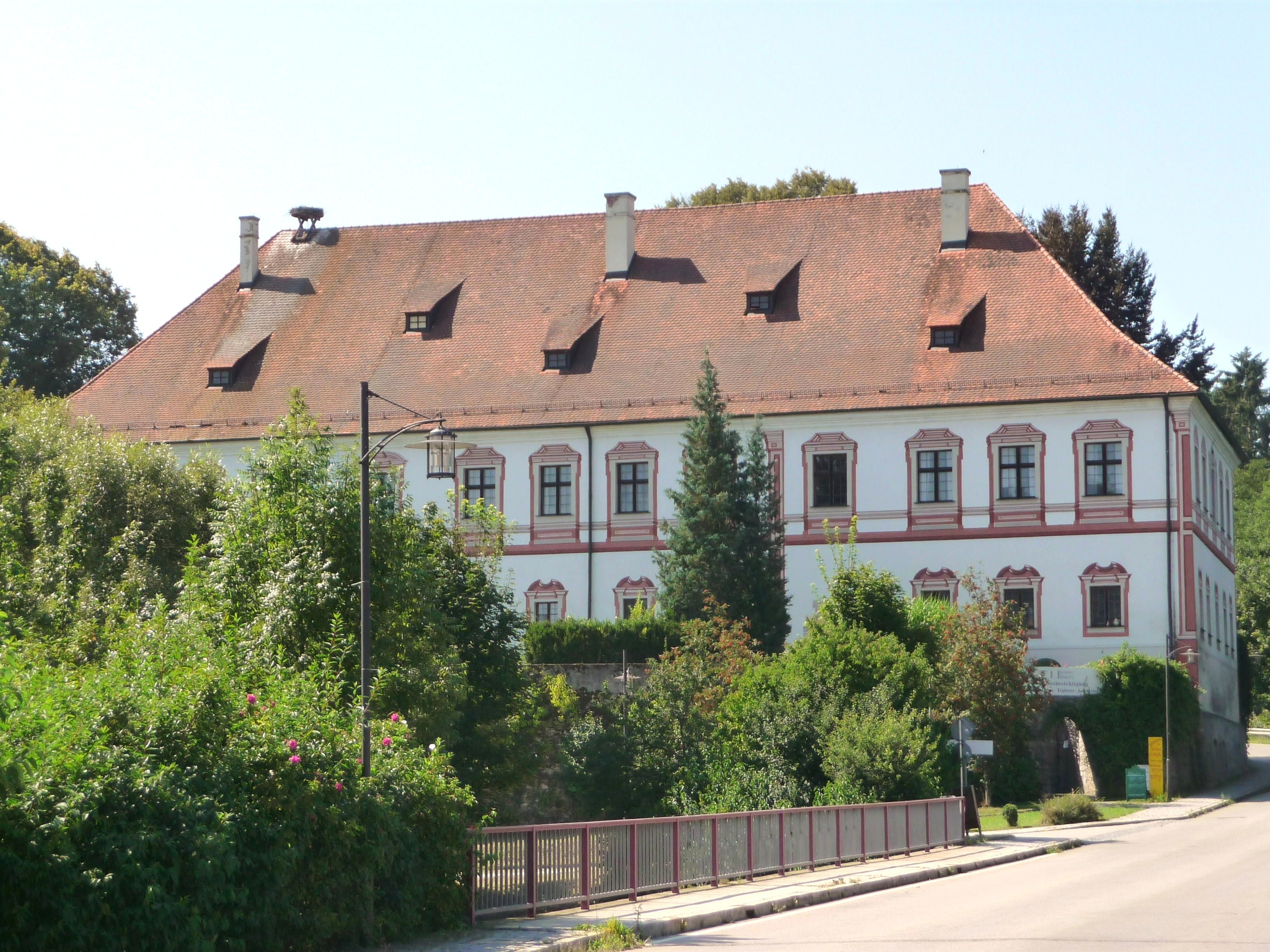
- Miltach Castle

- Coat of arms

- Location of Miltach within Cham district
- Interactive map of Miltach
- Location within Germany Location within Bavaria
- Coordinates: 49°9′N 12°46′E
- Country: Germany
- State: Bavaria
- Admin. region: Oberpfalz
- District: Cham

Government
  - Mayor (2020–26): Johann Aumeier (FW)

Area
  - Total: 25.24 km^{2} (9.75 sq mi)
- Elevation: 382 m (1,253 ft)

Population (2025-12-31)
  - Total: 2,295
  - Density: 90.93/km^{2} (235.5/sq mi)
- Time zone: UTC+01:00 (CET)
  - Summer (DST): UTC+02:00 (CEST)
- Postal codes: 93468
- Dialling codes: 0 99 44
- Vehicle registration: CHA
- Website: www.miltach.de

Miltach is a municipality in the district of Cham, which is located in Bavaria, Germany.
