= Wald, Upper Palatinate =

Wald
- Municipality
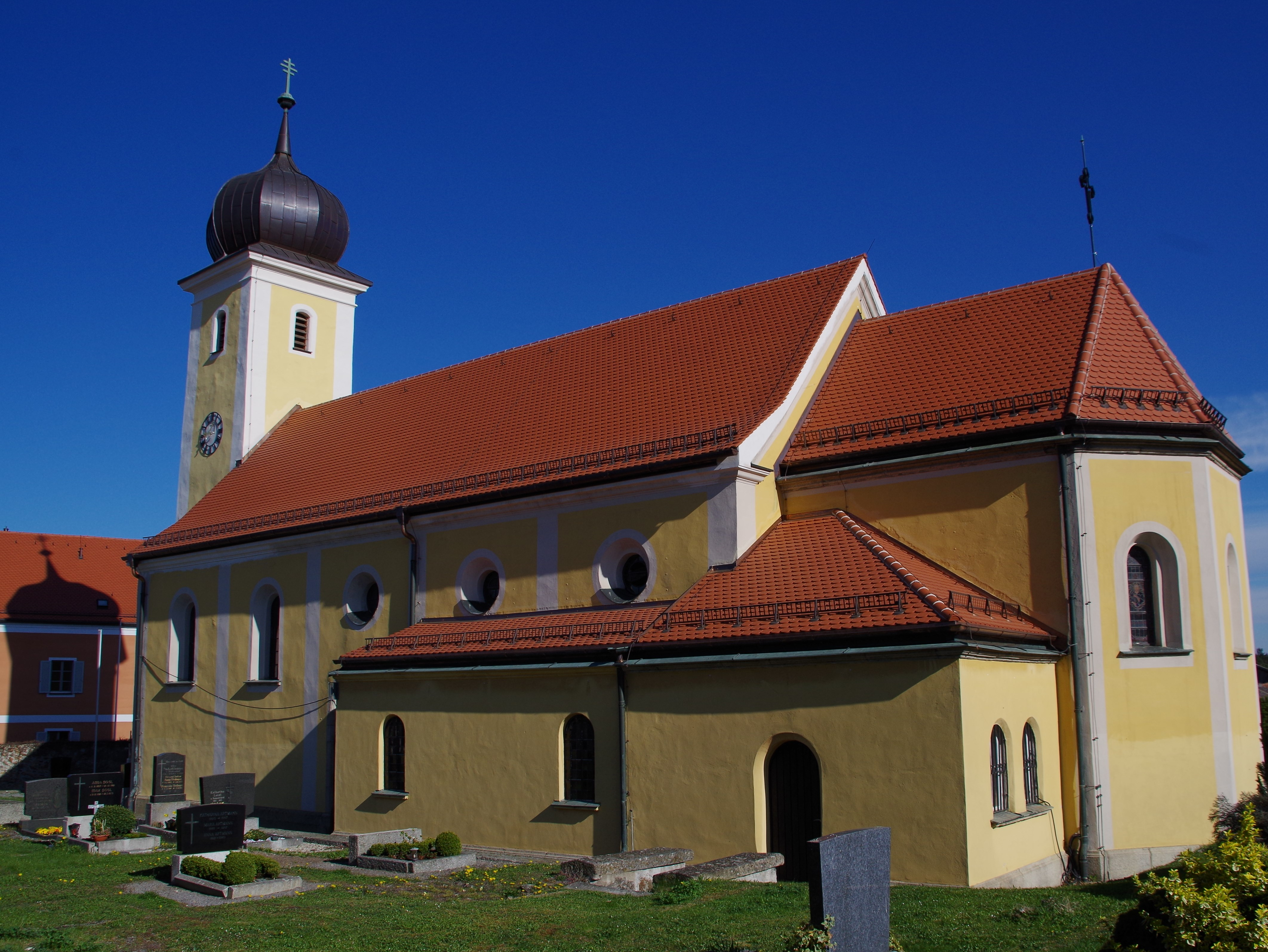
- Saint Lawrence Church

- Coat of arms

- Location of Wald within Cham district
- Interactive map of Wald
- Location within Germany Location within Bavaria
- Coordinates: 49°9′N 12°21′E
- Country: Germany
- State: Bavaria
- Admin. region: Oberpfalz
- District: Cham
- Municipal assoc.: Wald

Government
  - Mayor (2020–26): Barbara Haimerl (CSU)

Area
  - Total: 37.78 km^{2} (14.59 sq mi)
- Elevation: 543 m (1,781 ft)

Population (2025-12-31)
  - Total: 3,027
  - Density: 80.12/km^{2} (207.5/sq mi)
- Time zone: UTC+01:00 (CET)
  - Summer (DST): UTC+02:00 (CEST)
- Postal codes: 93192
- Dialling codes: 0 94 63
- Vehicle registration: CHA
- Website: www.gemeinde-wald.de

Wald (German pronunciation: [valt]) is a municipality in the district of Cham in Bavaria in Germany.
