= Gleißenberg =

- Municipality
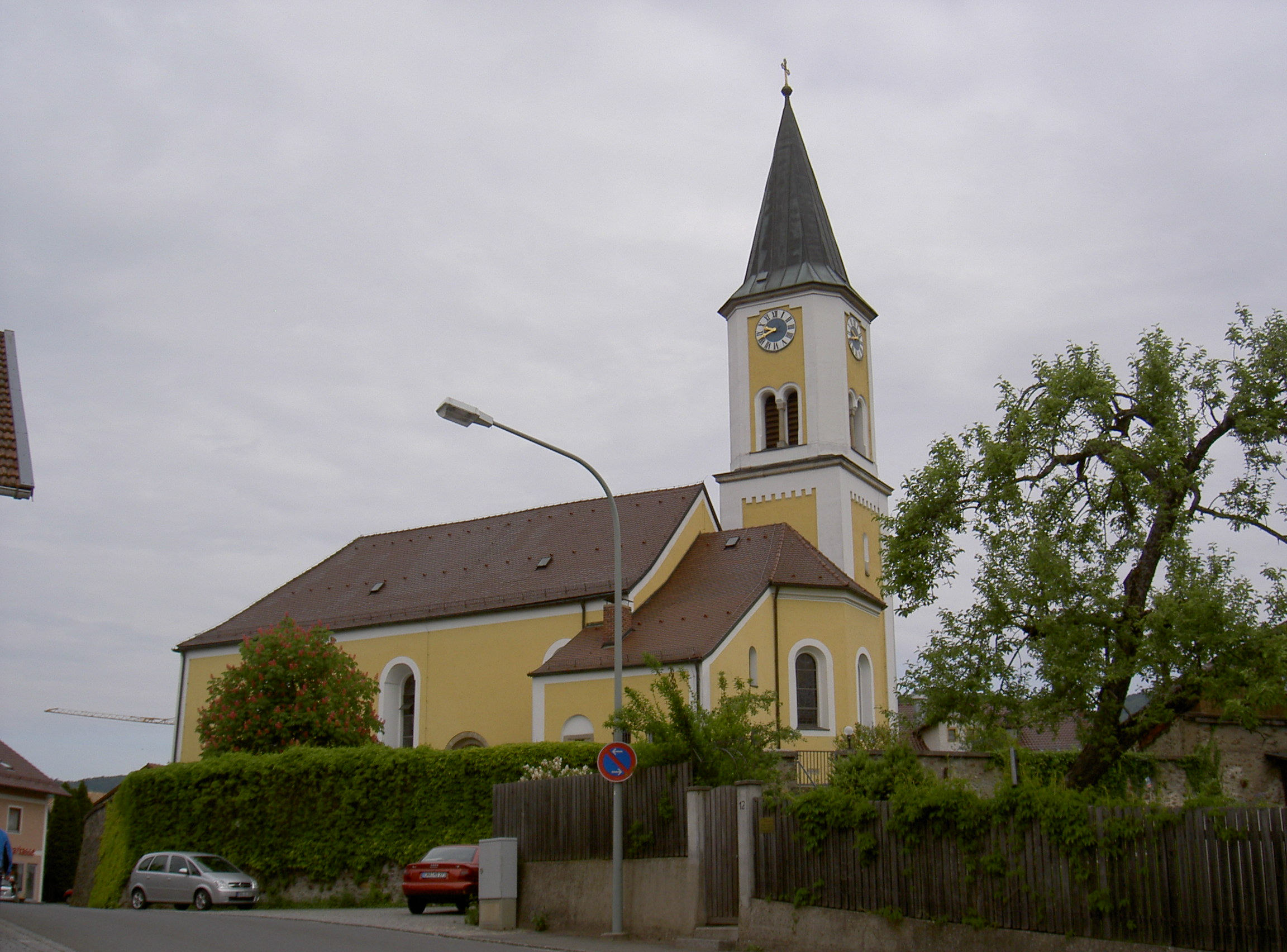
- Church of Saint Bartholomew

- Coat of arms

- Location of Gleißenberg within Cham district
- Interactive map of Gleißenberg
- Location within Germany Location within Bavaria
- Coordinates: 49°19′N 12°44′E
- Country: Germany
- State: Bavaria
- Admin. region: Oberpfalz
- District: Cham
- Municipal assoc.: Weiding

Government
  - Mayor (2020–26): Wolfgang Daschner

Area
  - Total: 15.38 km^{2} (5.94 sq mi)
- Elevation: 419 m (1,375 ft)

Population (2025-12-31)
  - Total: 785
  - Density: 51.0/km^{2} (132/sq mi)
- Time zone: UTC+01:00 (CET)
  - Summer (DST): UTC+02:00 (CEST)
- Postal codes: 93477
- Dialling codes: 0 99 75
- Vehicle registration: CHA
- Website: www.gleissenberg.de

Gleißenberg (German pronunciation: [ˈɡlaɪsn̩ˌbɛʁk]) is a municipality in the district of Cham in Bavaria in Germany.

Near Gleißenberg is the Bavarian Forest, trails that leads to the Kathlfelsen and offers views of the Arber mountain.
