= Rimbach-près-Masevaux =

Commune in Grand Est, France

- Commune
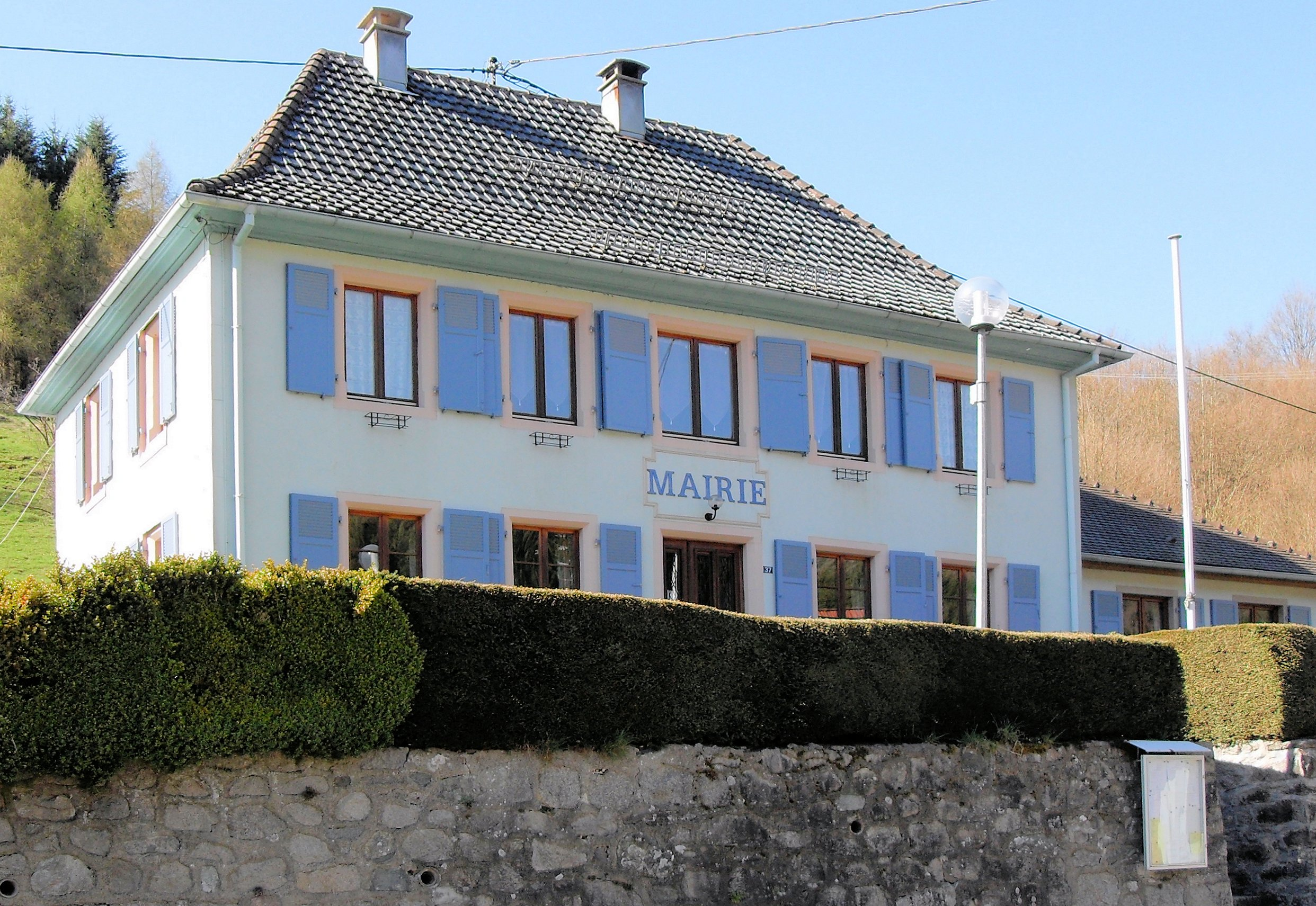
- The town hall in Rimbach-près-Masevaux

- Coat of arms
- Location of Rimbach-près-Masevaux
- Location within France Location within Grand Est
- Coordinates: 47°49′44″N 6°57′07″E
- Country: France
- Region: Grand Est
- Department: Haut-Rhin
- Arrondissement: Thann-Guebwiller
- Canton: Masevaux-Niederbruck
- Intercommunality: Vallée de la Doller et du Soultzbach

Government
  - Mayor (2020–2026): André Schmuck
- Area^{1}: 16.66 km^{2} (6.43 sq mi)
- Elevation: 580 m (1,900 ft)
- Highest elevation: 1,250 m (4,100 ft)
- Lowest elevation: 514 m (1,686 ft)
- Population (2023): 430
  - Density: 26/km^{2} (67/sq mi)
- Time zone: UTC+01:00 (CET)
  - Summer (DST): UTC+02:00 (CEST)
- INSEE/Postal code: 68275 /68290
- ^{1} French Land Register data, which excludes lakes, ponds, glaciers > 1 km^{2} (0.386 sq mi or 247 acres) and river estuaries.

Rimbach-près-Masevaux (German: Rimbach bei Masmünster; variant form of name: Rimpach) is a commune in the Haut-Rhin department in Grand Est in north-eastern France.

Villages, hamlets and quarters in the commune: Basse Bers (Niederebersche, Unterbers, Untere Bers), Ermensbach (Armspach, Ermenspach, Ermerspach, Ermspach), Grossenberg (Grosberg), Haute Bers (Oberenbers), Horben (Horb), Johannesberg (Johannisberg, Sankt Johannisberg), Langmatt (Langmatte), Neuerbet (Neu Arbet, Neu Erbet), Riedelsbourg (Riedelsburg), Riesenwald, Ruchberg

== Population ==
Historical population

Year	Pop.	±% p.a.
1793	592	—
1800	640	+1.12%
1806	674	+0.87%
1821	718	+0.42%
1831	767	+0.66%
1836	836	+1.74%
1841	896	+1.40%
1846	916	+0.44%
1851	902	−0.31%
1856	803	−2.30%
1861	798	−0.12%
1866	776	−0.56%
1871	727	−1.30%
1875	733	+0.21%
1880	727	−0.16%
1885	700	−0.75%
1890	703	+0.09%
1895	699	−0.11%
1900	661	−1.11%

Year	Pop.	±% p.a.
1905	642	−0.58%
1910	645	+0.09%
1921	599	−0.67%
1926	570	−0.99%
1931	540	−1.08%
1936	515	−0.94%
1946	491	−0.48%
1954	489	−0.05%
1962	501	+0.30%
1968	477	−0.81%
1975	444	−1.02%
1982	435	−0.29%
1990	456	+0.59%
1999	503	+1.10%
2007	502	−0.02%
2012	489	−0.52%
2017	464	−1.04%
2023	430	−1.26%

Source: EHESS and INSEE (1968-2023)

== See also ==
- Communes of the Haut-Rhin department

== Bibliography ==
- Patrimoine Dollar, the bulletin of the Société d'Histoire de la Vallée de Masevaux, publishes articles on Rimbach-près-Masevaux. Information on this journal can be obtained from the secrétaire-correspondent: M. Jean-Marie Ehret, 8 place de la Mairie, 68290 Oberbruck
- Two volumes of postcard views of this valley, compiled by Jean-Marie Ehret, Monique and Georges Redhaber, Bernard Sutter and Daniel Willmé, have been published by the Centre de Ressources des Vosges du Sud: La vallée de Masevaux à l'orée du siècle (1894–1914) (1995) and La vallée de Masevaux 1914-1918 (1997). Information can be obtained from: M. Armand Laurent, 1 rue du Buhl, 68290 Dolleren
- Historical and genealogical information from the Centre Départemental d'Histoire des Familles in Guebwiller: Rimbach-près-Masevaux
