= Osser =

Mountain in Germany

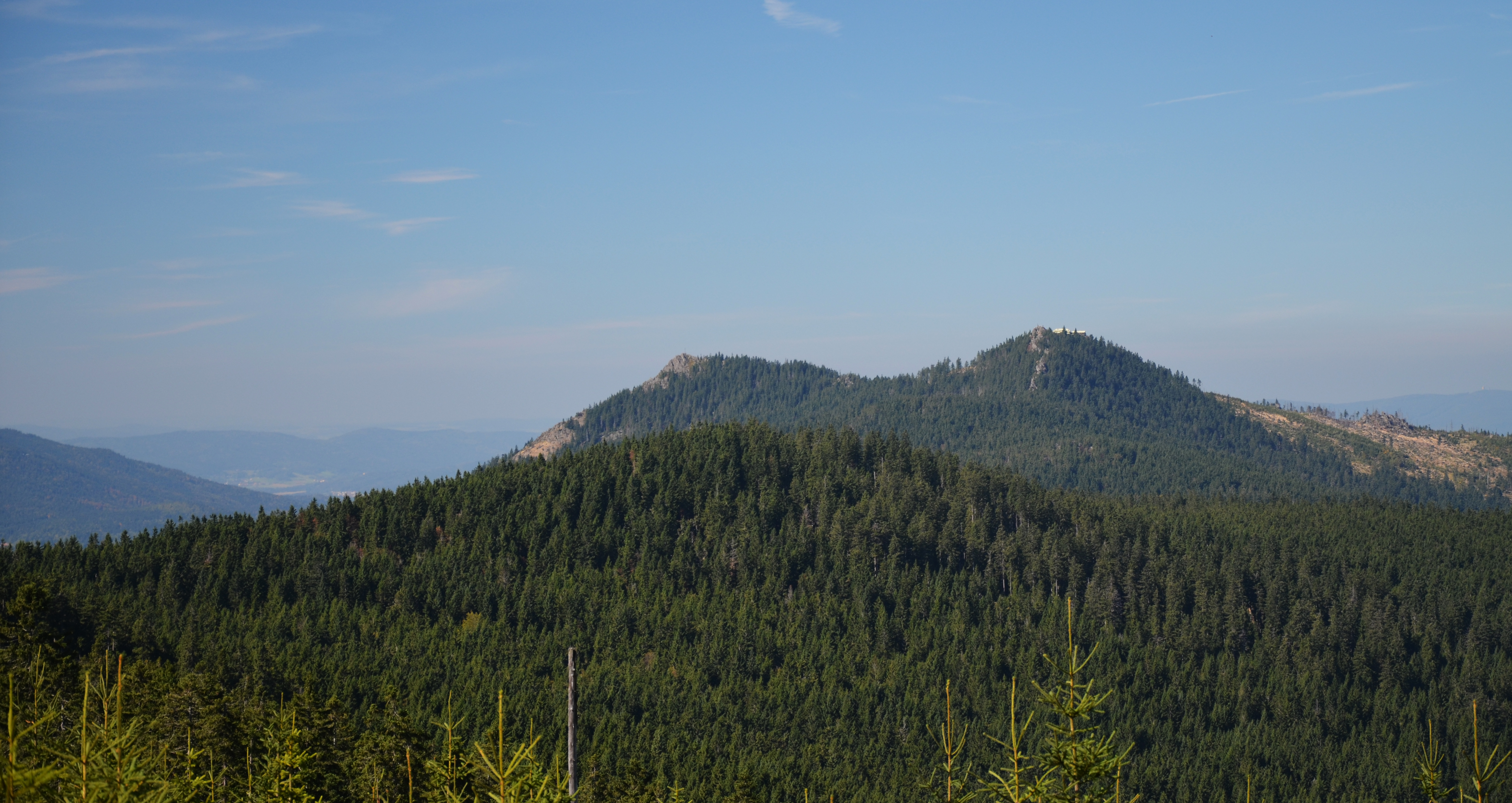
- The Kleiner and Großer Osser from Zwercheck to the SE

Highest point
- Elevation: 1,293 m (4,242 ft)
- Prominence: 155 m
- Isolation: 4.7 km → Zwercheck
- Coordinates: 49°12′13″N 13°06′33″E

Geography
- Location within Bavaria
- Location: Germany (Bavaria) / Czech Republic
- Parent range: Kunisch Mountains (Bohemian Forest / Bavarian Forest)

Geology
- Rock type: Schist

The Osser (Czech: Ostrý) is a mountain on the border between Germany and the Czech Republic, in the Bavarian Forest and Bohemian Forest and which belongs to the Kunisch Mountains.

== Location and description ==
A distinction is made between the Großer Osser (1,293 m) (Velký Ostrý), which is right on the border, and the Kleiner Osser (1,266 m) (Malý Ostrý) to the west which is entirely within Bavaria. Both summits lie on the German side in the county of Cham and on the municipal boundary between Lohberg to the southeast and Lam to the northwest. Due to their pointed shape, both summits are unique within the Bavarian Forest. They dominate the backdrop of the Lamer Winkel, an area of lowland between Arrach, Lam and Lohberg. The Osser lies in the county of Cham and thus within the Bavarian province of Upper Palatinate.

The Czechs also called the Osser affectionately the "breasts of the mother of God". Locals also call the local mountain of Lam the "Matterhorn of the Bavarian Forest".

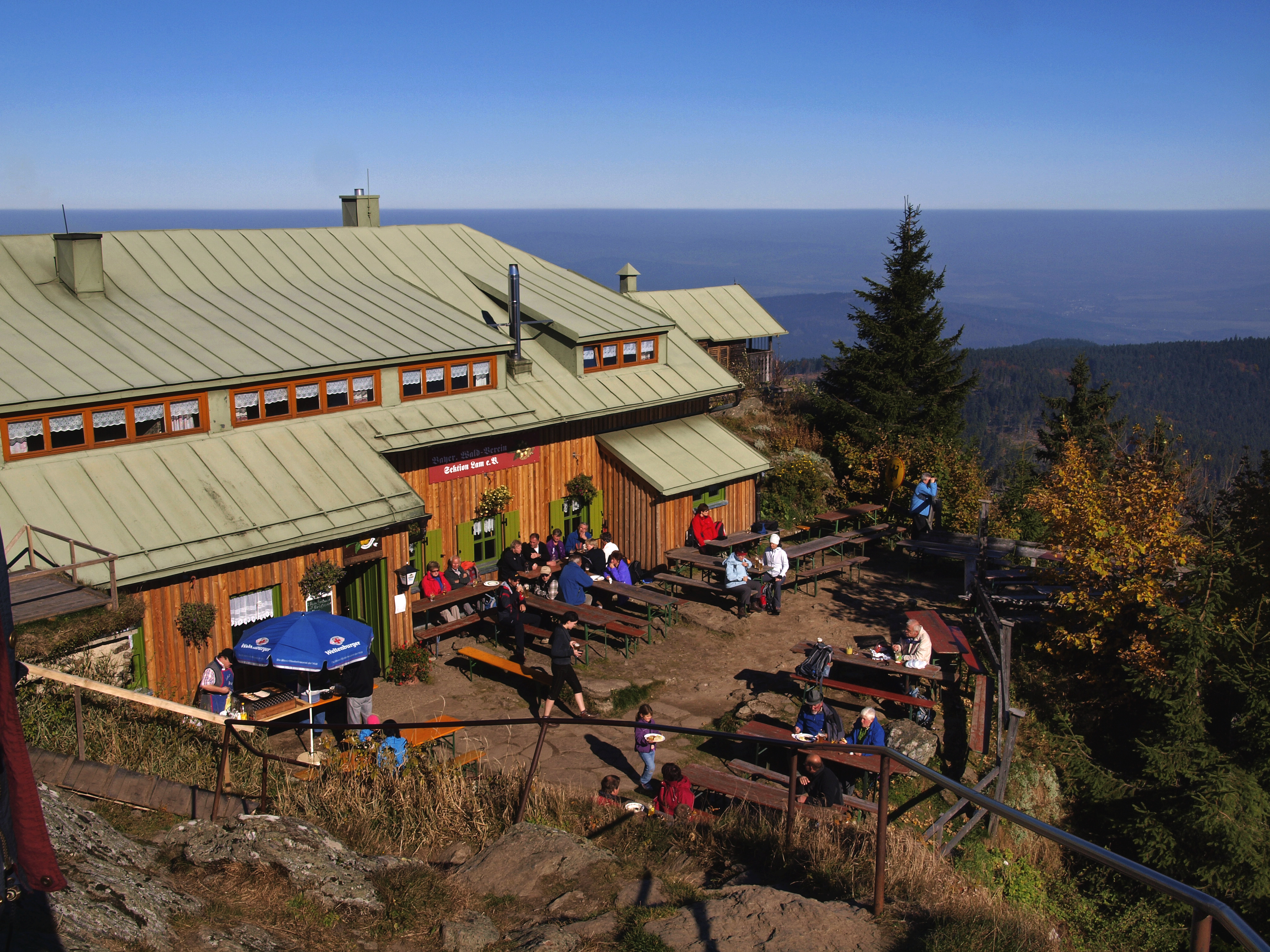
The Osser mountain hut, Haus Willmann, on the Großer Osser

At the summit of the Großer Osser on the Bavarian side of the border is the mountain hut of Haus Willmann, which is owned by the Bavarian Forest Club, which is managed during the summer months and also offers overnight accommodation. The pointed shape of the summit on the German side of the border means that the last 50 vertical metres or so involve an easy climb. Because the Osser is one of the best viewing mountains in the whole of the Bavarian Forest, it receives large numbers of German and Czech visitors on summer weekends, both hikers and tourists. From the summit cross there is an extensive view into Czechia over the Bohemian Forest, as well as to the nearly summit of the Arber and, in good visibility, even as far as the Alps.

Various footpaths lead to the Osser, all of which require sure-footedness. Start points are Lohberg, Silbersbach, Lam, Sattelparkplatz or Lambach. All the routes are steep, rocky and relatively challenging.

== History and legends ==
According to more recent research, the name Osser is of Celtic origin. In the 12th century the castle of Osserburg was built on the Osser. It has since been completely destroyed.

There are several fairy tales and legends about the Osser. The most popular and best known figure is the Osser Giant (Osserriese) and his stories. For example, it is said that there was once a third summit.

== Geotopes ==
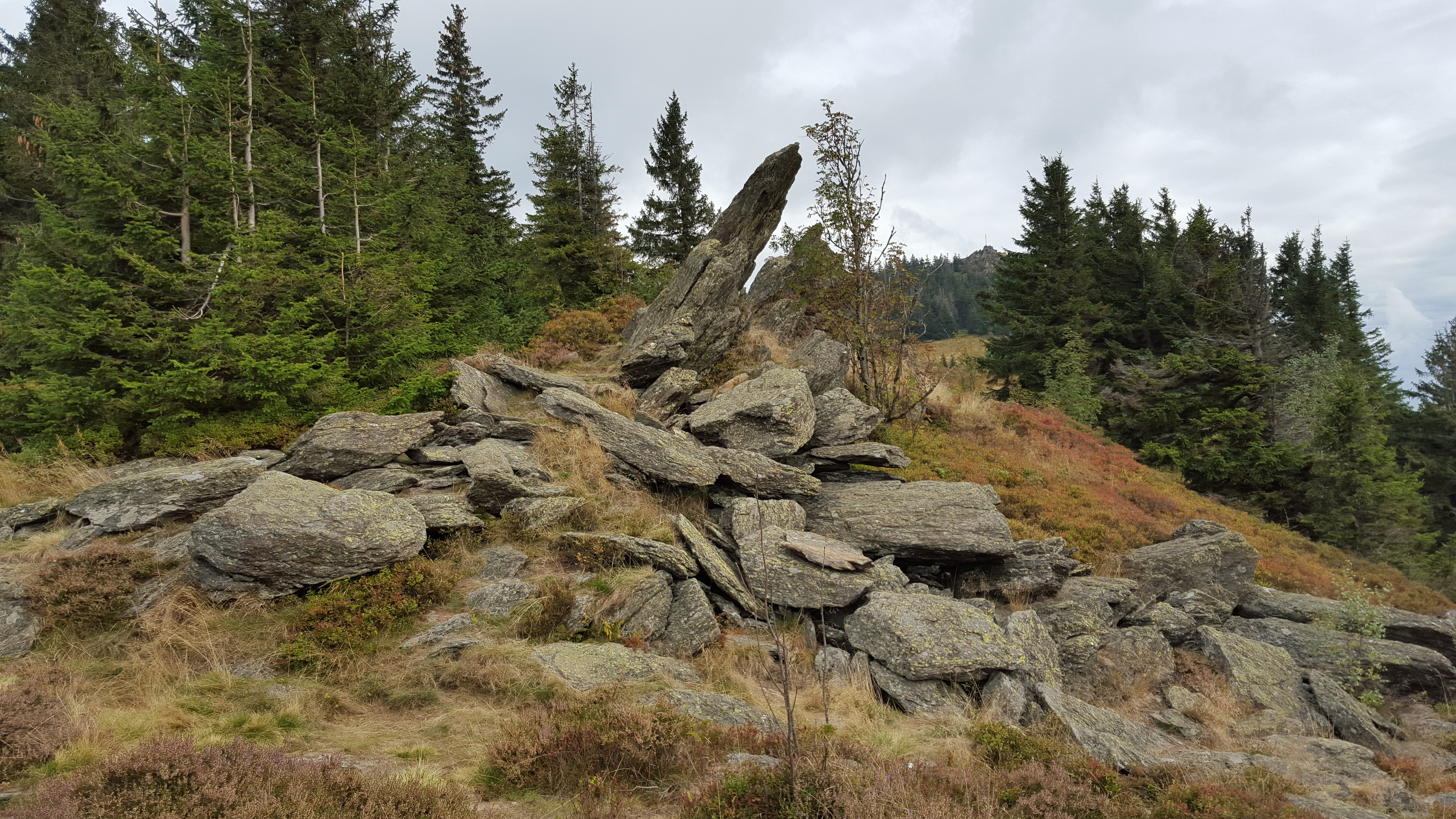
The Osserwiese meadow

=== Osser Saddle ===
The striking rocky rib of the Osser Saddle (Ossersattel) consists of the so-called Osser Quartzite, which is heavily folded here. Besides mica slates, quartzites are common in the area of the Kunisch Mountains. Quartzites are metamorphic rocks formed from sediments that were very rich in quartz sand.

The Osser Saddle is designated by the Bavarian State Office for the Environment (LfU) as a geo-scientifically valuable geotope (Geotope number: 372R009).

=== Kleiner Osser ===
The rocky summit of the Little Osser consists of quartz-rich and heavily folded mica slate. The rocky crags and numerous blocks are the result of increased weathering and erosion under the periglacial climatic conditions of recent geological history.

The crags are designated by the LfU as a geotope of geo-scientific importance (Geotope number: 372R011) and as a natural monument.

=== Großer Osser ===
The crags of the Großer Osser consist of quartz-rich, strongly folded mica slates, which contain numerous garnets (up to 4 mm diameter) in places.

The crags are designated by the LfU as a geotope of geo-scientific value (Geotope number: 372R010). They have also been awarded the official seal of approval as one of Bavaria's most beautiful geotopes by the LfU.

== Planned pumped-hydropower station ==
The planned Johanneszeche pumped storage hydropower station, rejected by the townsfolk of Lam, was to have located its upper basin on the Osser and an almost four kilometre long section of the pressure pipe was to be laid along an existing path.
