= Kleiner Arber =

Mountain in Germany

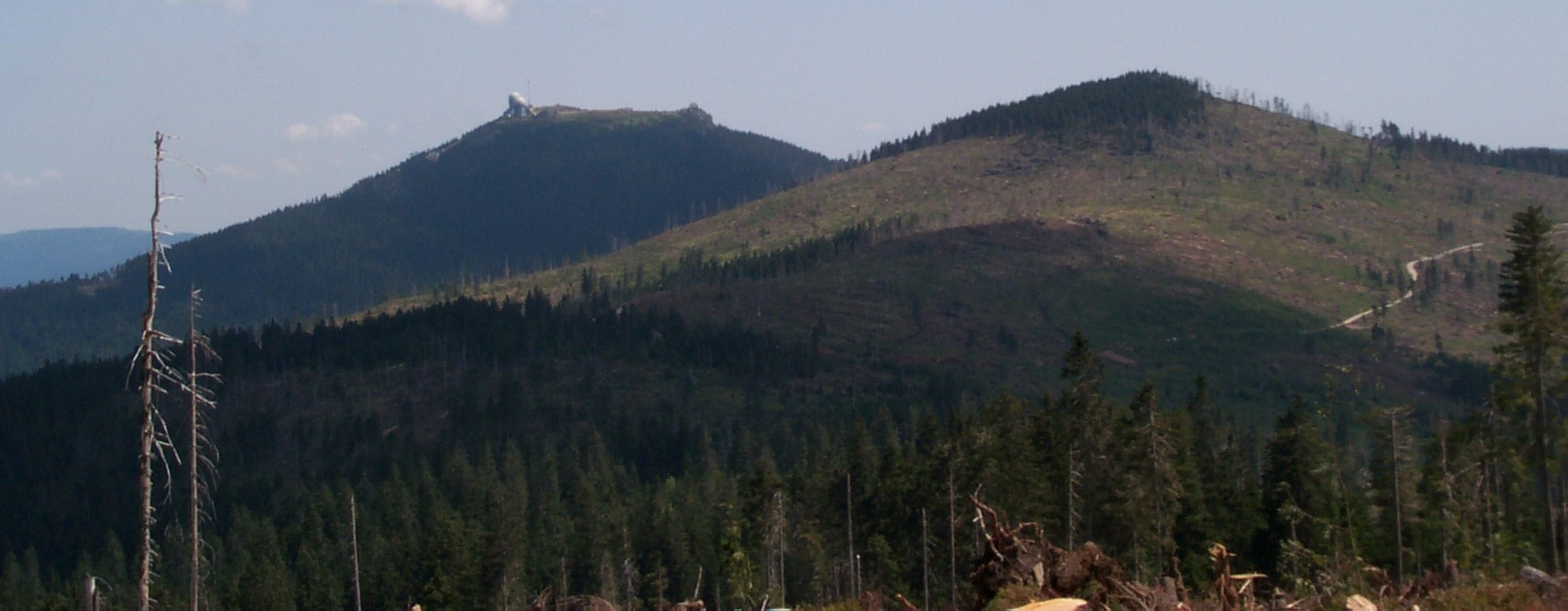
- The Kleiner Arber (r) and Großer Arber (l)

Highest point
- Elevation: 1,383.6 m above sea level (NHN) (4,539 ft)
- Coordinates: 49°6′48″N 13°6′35″E

Geography
- Location within Bavaria
- Location: Bavaria, Germany
- Parent range: Bavarian Forest

Geology
- Rock type: gneiss

The Kleiner Arber, sometimes also the Little Arber, in the Bavarian Forest is a mountain, 1,383.6 m above sea level (NHN), and the highest peak in the Bavarian province of Upper Palatinate. The border with Lower Bavaria runs over its summit and that of the Großer or Great Arber (1,455.5 m above NHN) to the east. An elongated rock outcrop west of the summit cross is the actual highest point in the Upper Palatinate (1,439.6 m).

On the rocky summit is an imposing wooden cross and summit register. The view extends over the Lamer Winkel into the Zellertal valley.

== Geography ==
The summit of the Kleiner Arber lies within the municipalities of Lohberg in the Upper Palatine county of Cham to the north and that of Bodenmais in the Lower Bavarian county of Regen to the south.

== Walking and facilities ==
Numerous footpaths lead to the top of the Kleiner Arber, including from Bodenmais, the lake of Kleiner Arbersee or from Schareben. In addition, the E6 European long distance path runs from the Kaitersberg to the Falkenstein over the summit.

To the east and just below the top is the Chamer Hut. It was built in 1952 by the Cham branch of the Bavarian Forest Club and run as a restaurant. In 1956, it was taken over by the German Youth Hostel Association who converted it into a youth hostel. It was closed in 1999, but re-opened on 20 December 2008 as a mountain hut.

== Gallery ==
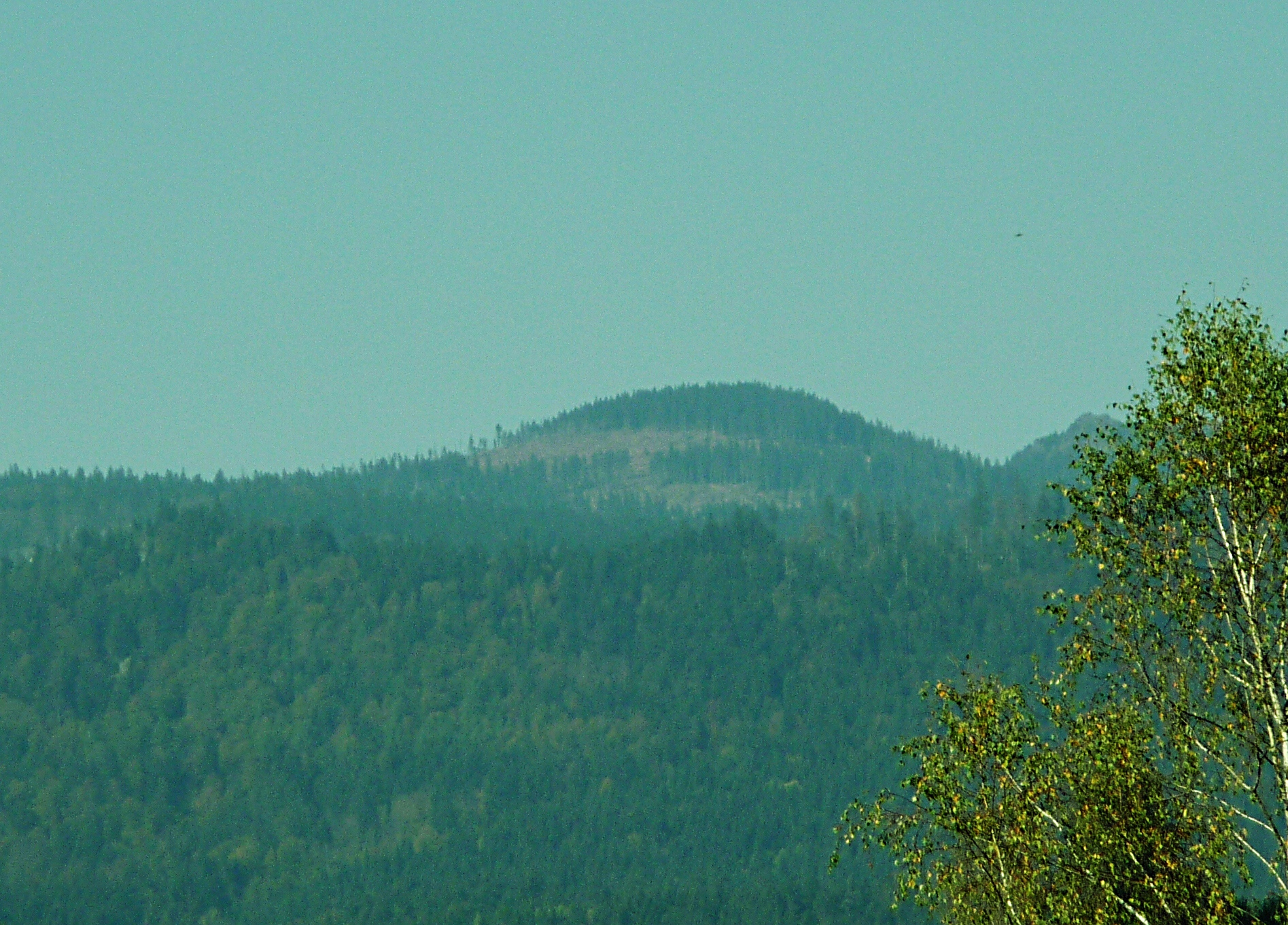
The Kleiner Arber seen from Bärnzell
