= Upper Bavarian Forest Nature Park =

Coordinates: 49.241397°N 12.695905°E

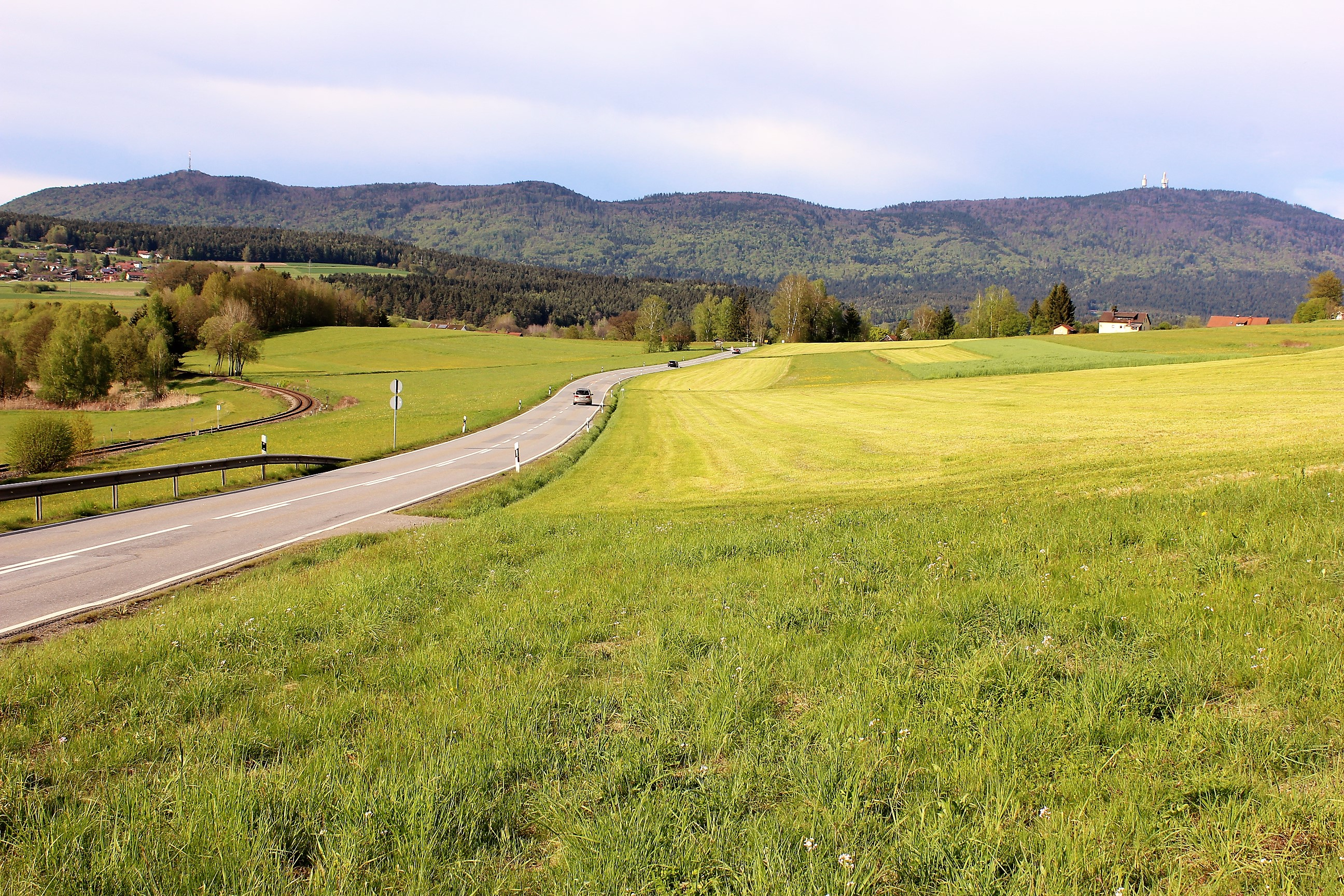
View of the mountain ridge of the Hoher Bogen in the Upper Bavarian Forest Nature Park

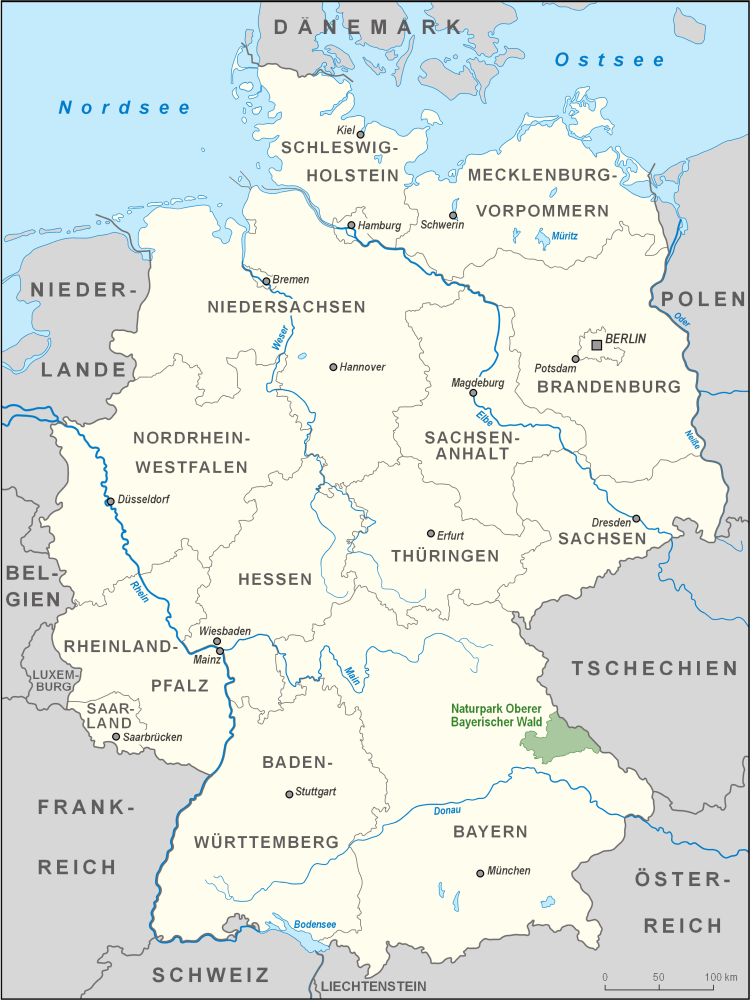
Location of the Upper Bavarian Forest Nature Park

The Upper Bavarian Forest Nature Park (German: Naturpark Oberer Bayerischer Wald) covers an area of 1,796 km^{2} and is thus one of the largest nature parks in the German state of Bavaria.

== Landscape ==
The nature park covers the whole territory of the county of Cham and the eastern part of the county of Schwandorf. In the northwest it borders the Upper Palatine Forest Nature Park, in the east, the Czech Republic, and in the south on the Bavarian Forest Nature Park.
Its highest summits are the Großer Osser (1,293 m), Hoher Bogen (1,079 m), Kaitersberg (1,133 m), Enzian (1,285 m), Schwarzeck (1,238 m), Zwercheck (1,333 m) and Kleiner Arber (1,384 m). The proportion of forest today is about 40 percent. 76 percent of the nature park territory is protected and 2,084 hectares have been designated as nature reserve.

== Geology ==
The mica schist on the Osser and the chalk transgression in the Obertrübenbach Quarry are among Bavaria's most attractive geotopes. In addition to the dominant crystalline bedrock of granite and gneiss there are various sedimentary layers, siliceous and calcareous rocks, ancient limestones, mica schists and, in the geological feature of the 150-kilometre-long Pfahl ridge, quartzite and slate, which in places form rock pinnacles and towers. Guided tours in the Fürstenzeche Lam are offered for mineral collectors.

== Nature ==
The spignel plant, which occurs in these mountains and from which the Bärwurz spirit is distilled, is well known. In some meadow valleys, rare orchids are found. For bird lovers, the Regentalaue nature reserve west of Cham with the Rötelseeweiher ponds offers good opportunities for observation.

== See also ==
- List of nature parks in Germany
