= Enzian (Bavarian Forest) =

Mountain in Germany

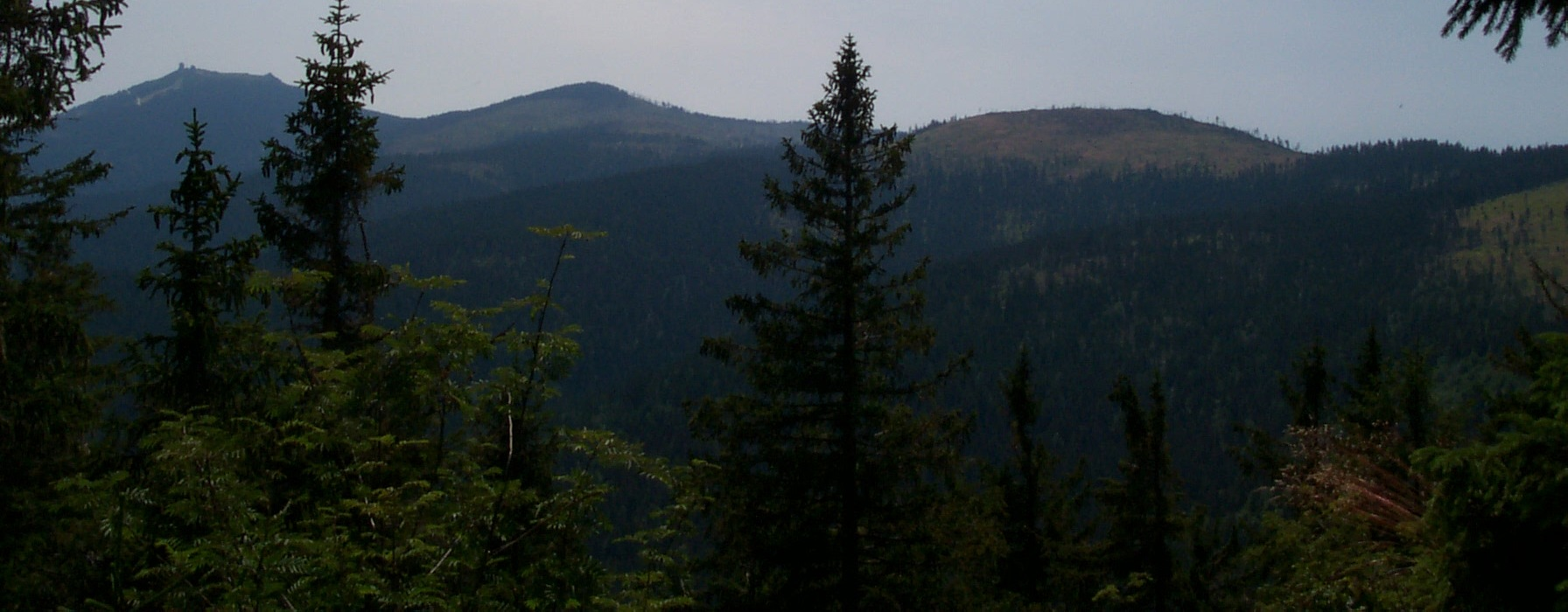
- The Enzian (centre right)

Highest point
- Elevation: 1,285 m above sea level (NHN) (4,216 ft)
- Coordinates: 49°07′25″N 13°05′00″E

Geography
- Location within Bavaria
- Location: Grenze Cham and Regen, Bavaria (Germany)
- Parent range: Bavarian Forest

Geology
- Rock type: gneiss

The Enzian is a mountain, 1,285 m above sea level (NHN), in the Bavarian Forest in Germany. It rises from the ridge northwest of the Arber and its summit lies on the boundary between the counties of Cham and Regen, with the municipality of Lohberg in the north and Drachselsried in the west-southwest.

The E6 European long distance path runs over its bare, flat summit from the Arber to the Kaitersberg. At the highest point is a checkpoint (Stempelstelle) and a summit register. On a walk along the crest of the Arber views open up time and again of the Zellertal valley and the bowl of the Lamer Winkel. However, the Enzian is almost never climbed as a destination on its own.
