= Kunisch Mountains =

Mountain range in Germany

Kunisch Mountains Künisches Gebirge Královský hvozd
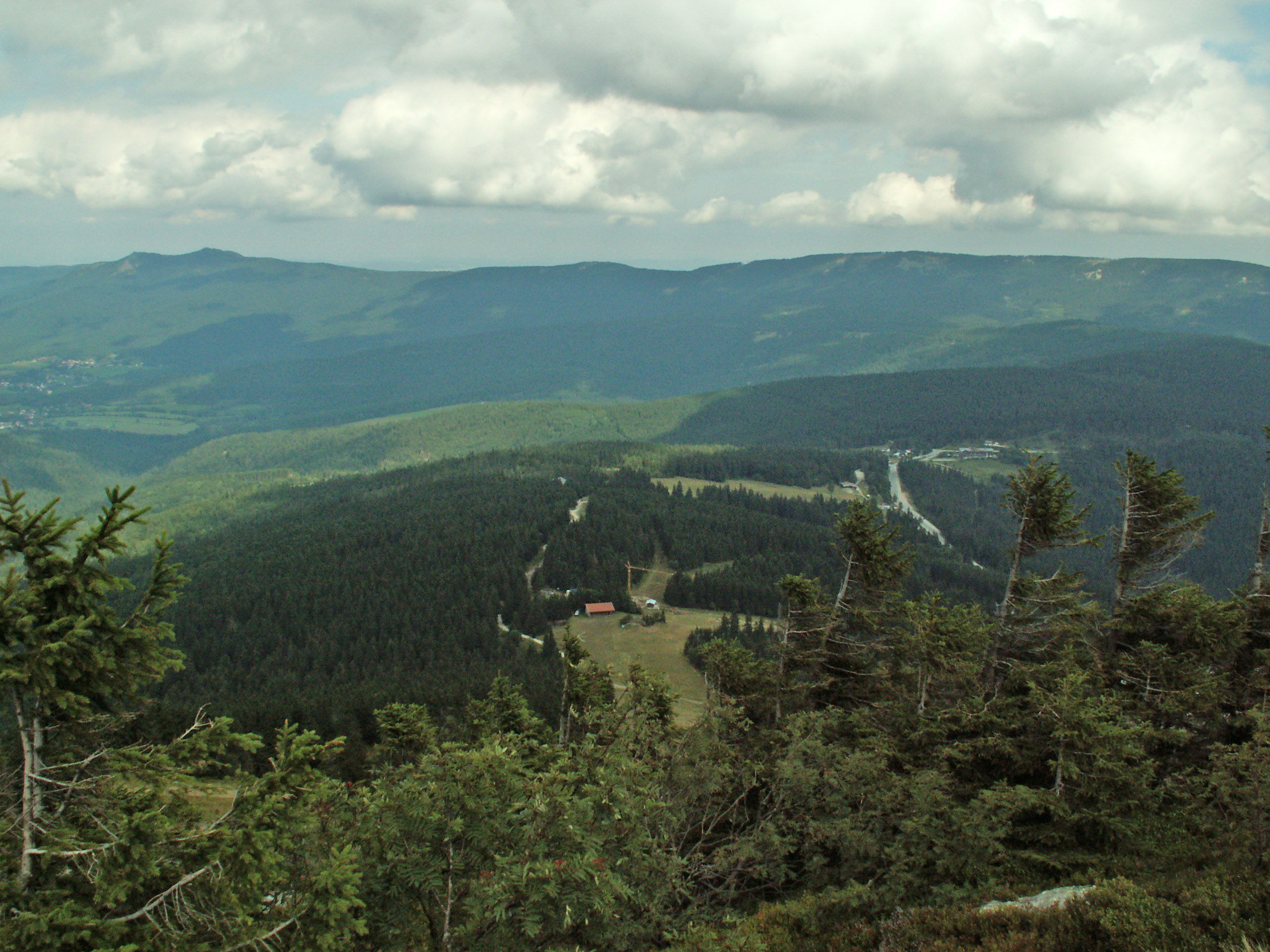
- The chain of the Kunisch Mountains between the Großer Arber and Großer Arbersee

Highest point
- Peak: Jezerní hora
- Elevation: 1,343 m (4,406 ft)

Geography
- State(s): Germany, Czech Republic
- Range coordinates: 49°10′06″N 13°11′08″E

Geology
- Orogeny: Truncated highland
- Rock type(s): Gneiss, mica schist, granodiorite

The Kunisch Mountains (German: Künisches Gebirge; Czech: Královský hvozd – meaning "Royal Forest") is a range that includes part of the Bavarian Forest and the central Bohemian Forest, with its main chain between the Osser and the Zwercheck close to Upper Palatinate. From a geological perspective the Kunisch Mountains occupy a special position, because they are made of mica schist instead of the gneisses and granites that are common elsewhere in the Bavarian Forest. It has good farming soils and heavy precipitation which often falls as snow and ice in winter.

== Literature ==
- Im Landes der künischen Freibauern. Heimatbuch für den mittleren Böhmerwald. (Landkreis Bergreichenstein und angrenzende Gebiete); Herausgeber: Volkskundlicher Arbeitskreis für den mittleren Böhmerwald "Künische Freibauern" e.V., Verlag Morsak, Grafenau (Niederbayern) 1979, ISBN 978-3-87553-101-5, pp. 5–839.
- Johanna von Herzogenberg: Zwischen Donau und Moldau. Bayerischer Wald und Böhmerwald - Das Mühlviertel und Südböhmen. Prestel-Verlag, Munich, 1968, pp. 5–350. (with an overview map)
- Südböhmen. In: Lillian Schacherl: Böhmen - Kulturbild einer Landschaft. Prestel-Verlag, Munich, 1966, pp. 139–212.
