= Lamer Winkel =

Coordinates: 49°10′37″N 13°5′22″E

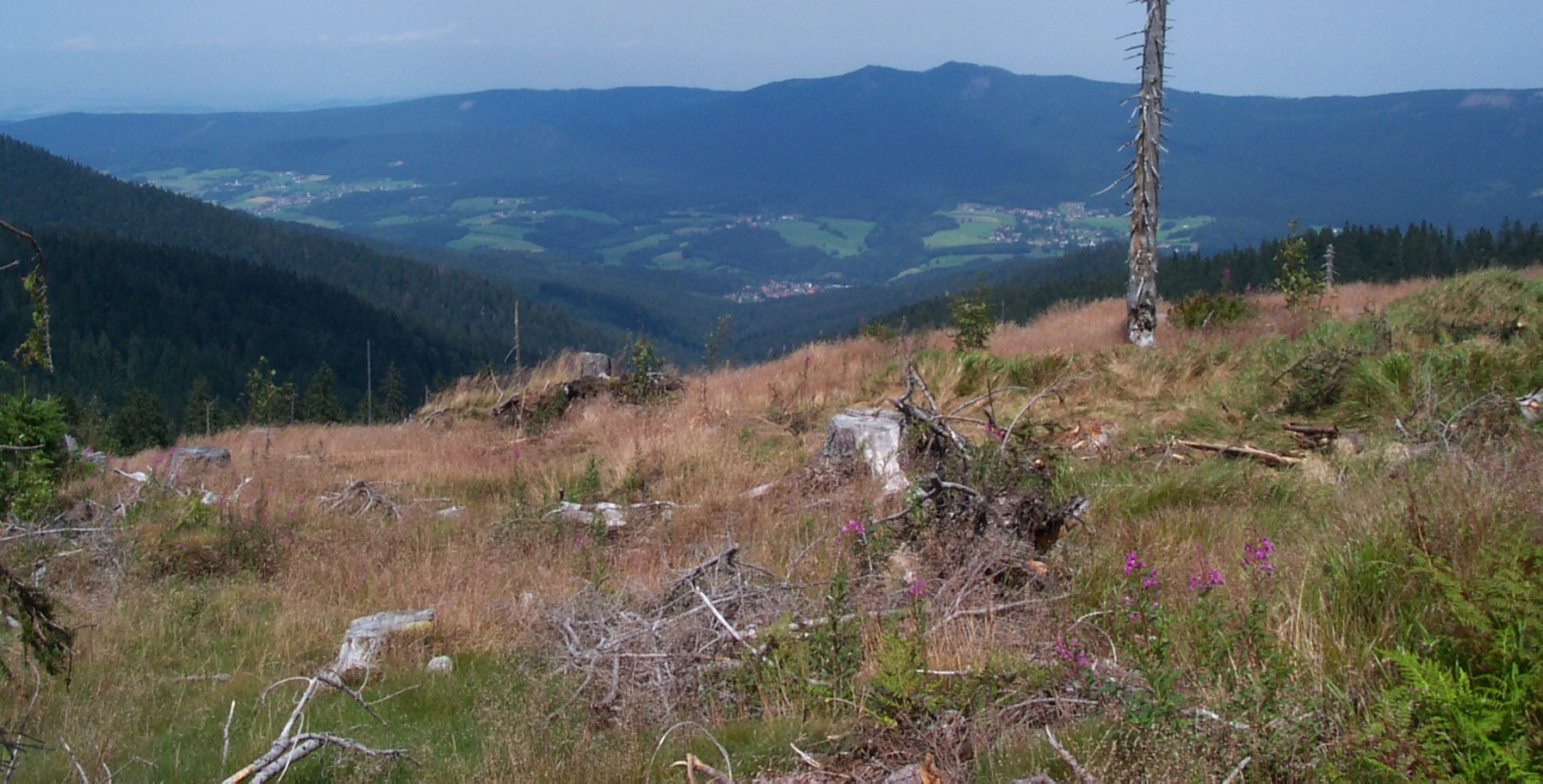
The Lamer Winkel and the Osser. Left: the south ridge of the Schwarzeck.

The Lamer Winkel is a region in the northern Bavarian Forest between the mountains of Hoher Bogen, Osser, Arber and Kaitersberg; politically it belongs to the county of Cham in the Bavarian province of Upper Palatinate.

== Geography ==
This formerly remote valley is one of the most scenic regions of the Bavarian Forest and, as a result, has been heavily developed in recent decades for tourism. In the Lamer Winkel are the municipalities of Lohberg, Lam and Arrach, which form a popular holiday region, especially for families.

The valley is surrounded by the densely wooded ridges of the Hoher Bogen and the Kunisch Mountains in the north and by the crests of the Arber and Kaitersberg in the south. There are numerous hiking trails to the surrounding summits as well as along the valley. Hiking, walking, cycling and, in winter, cross-country skiing are popular activities.

The Lamer Winkel is not only accessible by car, but also with the Oberpfalzbahn railway, which runs from Cham to Lam. The latter is the largest village in the valley and gives it its name. It remains an unspoilt market village.

Bayerischer-wald.org offers a regional description of the Lamer Winkel as a valley tourism destination framed by the Osser, Arber, and Kaitersberg mountains, listing the main towns.

== History ==
The Lamer Winkel was first developed in 1279 by clearance and settlement activity under the aegis of Rott am Inn Abbey. By 1420 most of the villages outside Lam had been established. In the 15th century, the Hussite Wars and Böckler War led to considerable devastation and abandonment. In the 16th century the villages and farmsteads were rebuilt The old glassworks, glass grinding workshops and hammer mills in Lohberghütte and Schrenkenthal developed into early industrial sites in the 19th century.
