= Arrach =

- Municipality
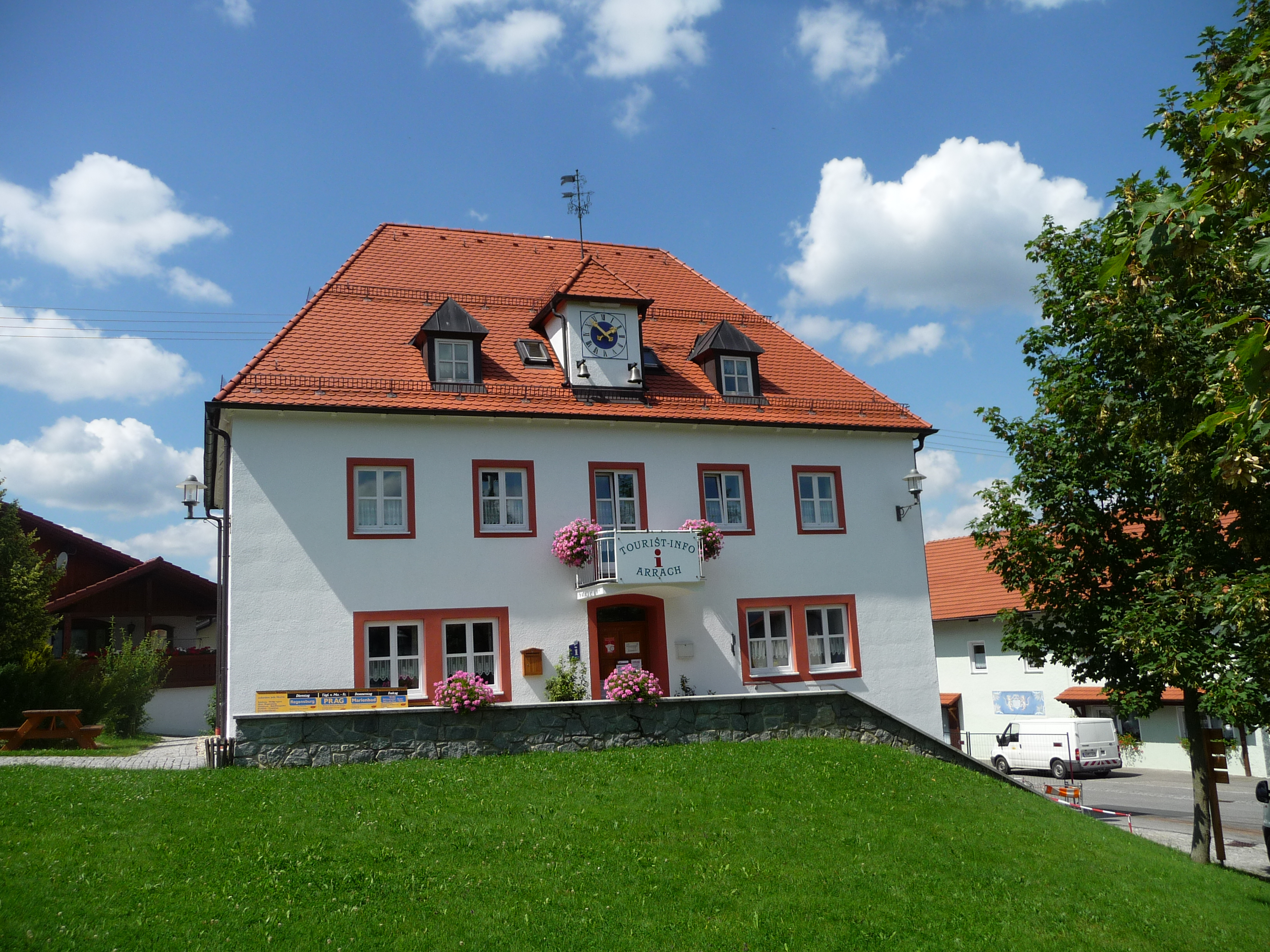
- Tourist information building in the village center

- Coat of arms

- Location of Arrach within Cham district
- Interactive map of Arrach
- Location within Germany Location within Bavaria
- Coordinates: 49°12′N 13°0′E
- Country: Germany
- State: Bavaria
- Admin. region: Oberpfalz
- District: Cham
- Subdivisions: 13 Ortsteile

Government
  - Mayor (2020–26): Gerhard Mühlbauer (FW)

Area
  - Total: 28.81 km^{2} (11.12 sq mi)
- Elevation: 490 m (1,610 ft)

Population (2025-12-31)
  - Total: 2,292
  - Density: 79.56/km^{2} (206.0/sq mi)
- Time zone: UTC+01:00 (CET)
  - Summer (DST): UTC+02:00 (CEST)
- Postal codes: 93474
- Dialling codes: 0 99 43
- Vehicle registration: CHA
- Website: www.arrach.de

Arrach (German pronunciation: [ˈaʁax]) is a municipality in the district of Cham in Bavaria in Germany. It lies within the scenic valley of the Lamer Winkel. It is located in/near the Bavarian Forest.
