= Großer Arber =

Mountain in Germany

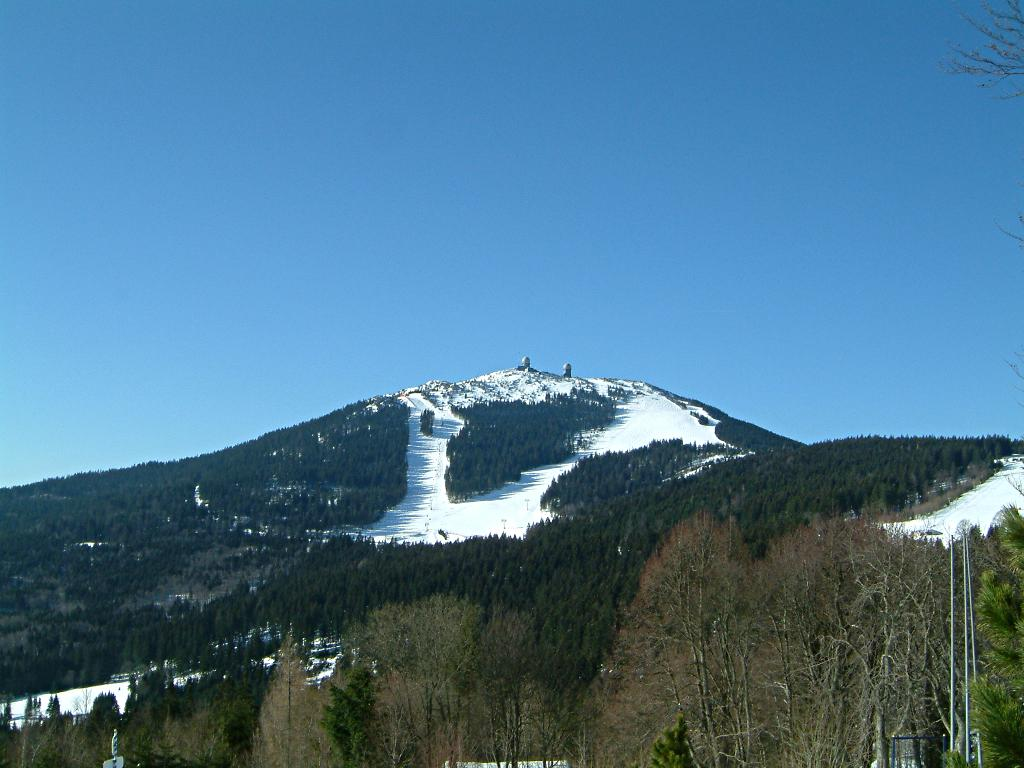
- View from North

Highest point
- Elevation: 1,455.5 m (4,775 ft)
- Prominence: 1,031 m (3,383 ft) ↓ Letohrad
- Isolation: 147 km (91 mi) → Traunstein to Hochleckenkogel
- Coordinates: 49°6′44″N 13°8′4″E

Geography
- Location within Germany Location within Bavaria
- Location: Bavaria, Germany
- Parent range: Bavarian Forest; Bohemian Forest

The Großer Arber (German pronunciation: [ˈɡʁoːsɐ ˈaʁbɐ]; Czech: Velký Javor, "Great Maple") or Great Arber, is the highest peak of the Bavarian/Bohemian Forest mountain range and in Lower Bavaria, with an elevation of 1,455.5 metres (4,775 ft). As a result, it is known in the Lower Bavarian county of Regen and the Upper Palatine county of Cham as the "King of the Bavarian Forest". Its summit region consists of paragneiss.

== Name ==
In a 1279 document, the mountain bore the name Adwich; Johannes Aventinus called it Hädweg in 1500; and, in 1540, Ätwa. Philipp Apian referred to it as Aetwha m., i.e. Aetwha mons (mons, montis = Lat. mountain/hill); in 1720, it was recorded on a map as Aidweich. According to more recent research, the name is of Celtic origin. In 1740, it is recorded for the first time as Arber.

== Geography ==
=== Location ===
Bird's-eye view of the Großer Arber summit

The Großer Arber rises in the Rear Bavarian Forest on the boundary of the Upper Bavarian Forest Nature Park to the north and the Bavarian Forest Nature Park to the south. The boundary runs close to the summit, which itself is in the municipality of Bayerisch Eisenstein, while its southwestern flank is in Bodenmais – both in the county of Regen. Its western slopes are in the municipality of Lohberg in the county of Cham.

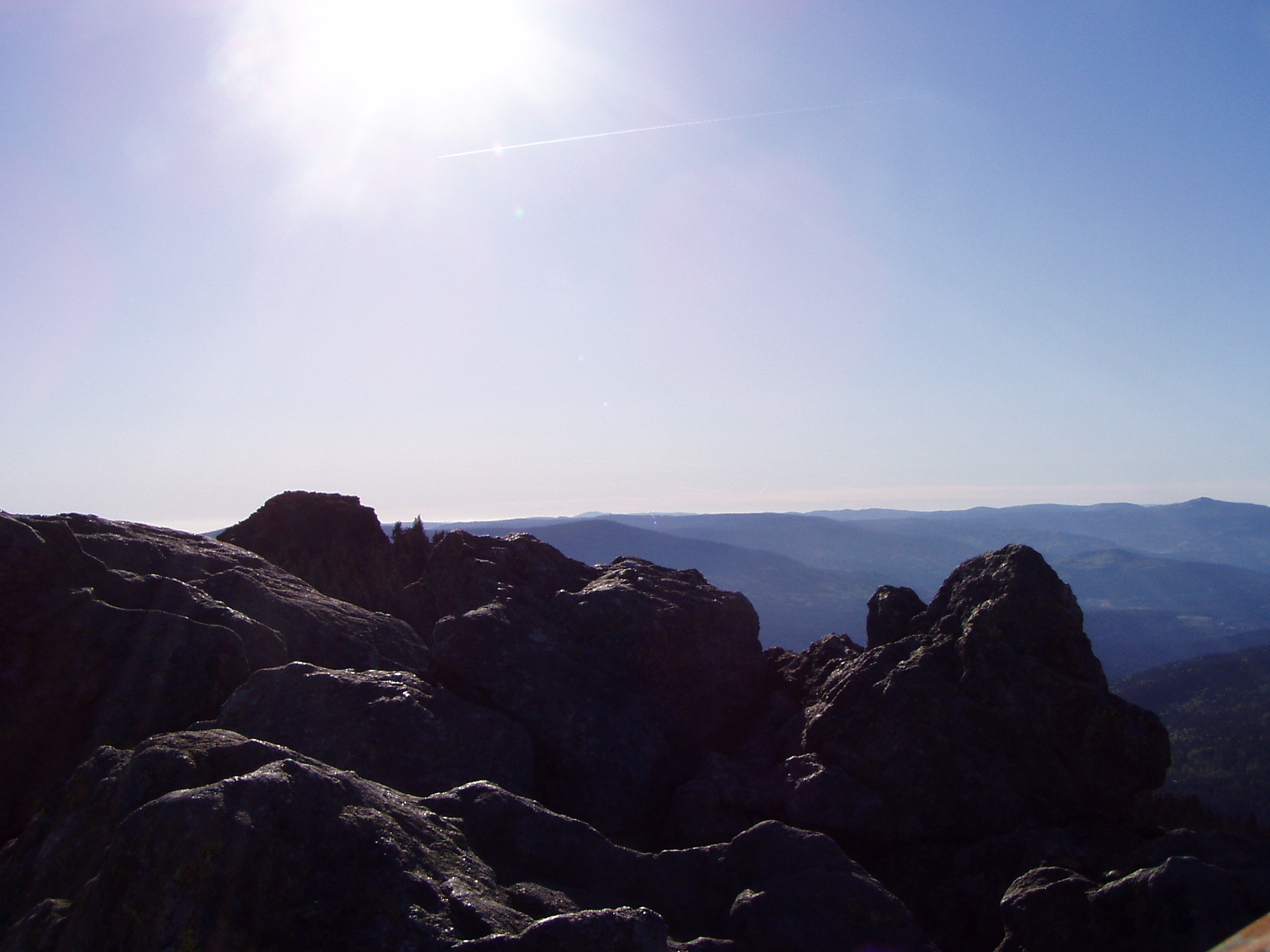
Rocks of the Richard Wagner Kopf with the Großer Rachel in the background

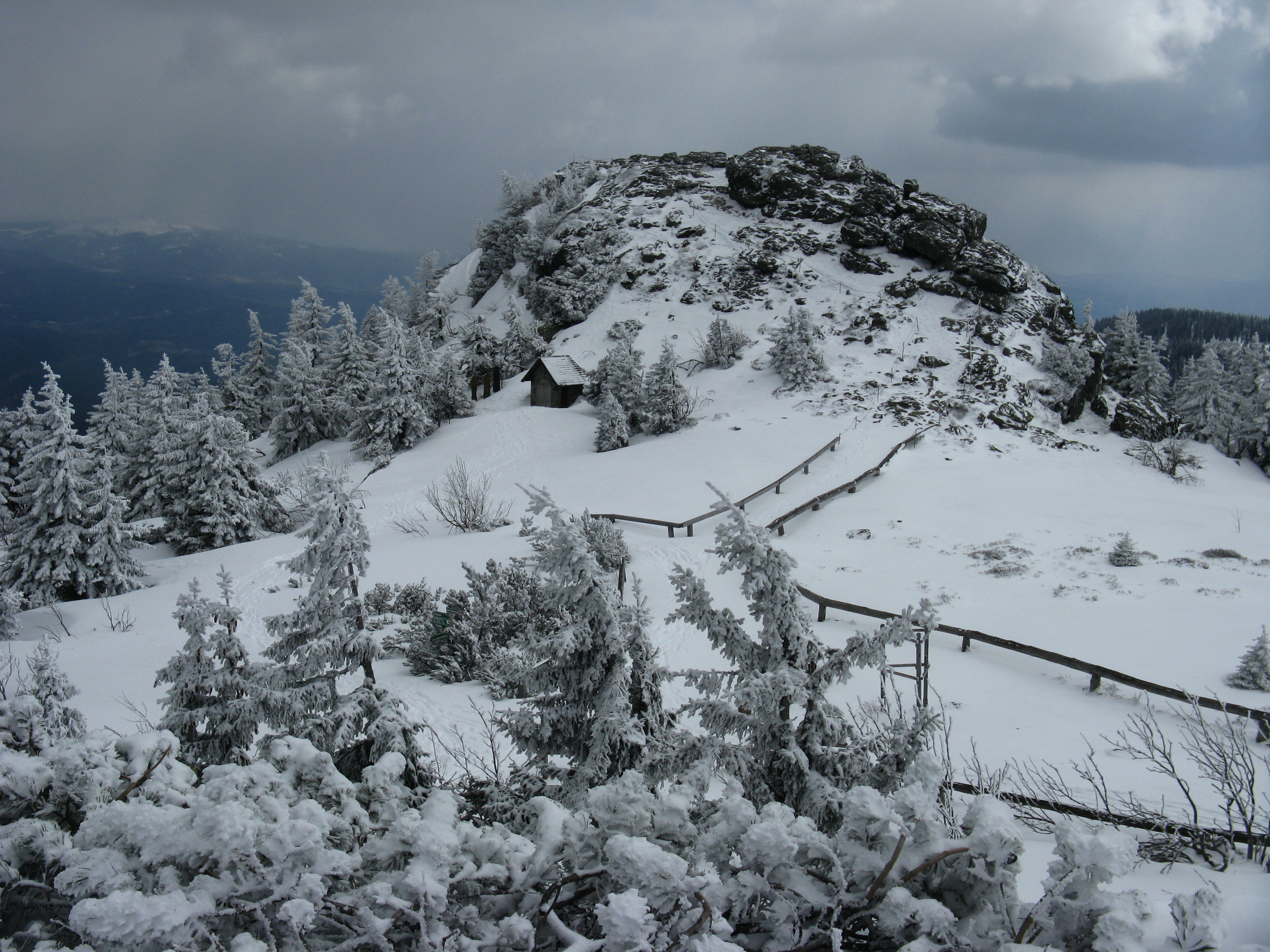
The Großer Seeriegel

The Großer Arber has four tops: the main top with its 1913 summit cross, the Bodenmaiser Riegel with its characteristic, often photographed Richard Wagner Kopf, as well as the Kleiner and Großer Seeriegel. Also part of the mountain group is the Little Arber (1,384 m).

=== Natural regions ===
The Großer Arber is part of the natural regional major unit group of the Upper Palatine and Bavarian Forest (No. 40), in the major unit of the Rear Bavarian Forest (403), the sub-unit of the Arber-Kaitersberg Ridge (403.5) and the natural region of the Arber Massif (403.51).

=== Waterbodies ===
On the southeastern flank of the Großer Arber lies the lake of Großer Arbersee and, to the northwest and north-northeast of the Kleiner Arber is the Kleiner Arbersee, which both lie within a nature reserve. Among the rivers and streams rising on the mountain are: two Arberbachs (one to the east and one to the south), the Geigenbach, Hirschaubach, Schwellbach, Seebach, Steinbach, Teufelsbach, and Weidenbach. The Großer Regen flows past the mountain to the northeast, being fed near the mountain by the Arberseeback and Teufelsbach, and on the northwestern flank the White Regen drains the Kleiner Arbersee, which is fed by the Weidenbach.

== Nature parks ==
Since summer 1995, a full-time nature conservation presence has been active in the Bavarian Forest Nature Park in the area of the Großer Arber. Their management of the area is primarily focused on the summit region, but also on the protected areas on the mountain as a contact partner for conservation questions and for guided tours. Among their tasks are visitor information, public relations and the monitoring of protected area regulations. Since 1999, another area support service for the Großer Arber has been provided by the neighbouring Upper Bavarian Forest Nature Park (focus: summit plateau and Kleiner Arbersee Nature Reserve).

== Protected areas ==
From the summit region of the Großer Arber, the nature reserve of the Great Arbersee and Arberseewand (Großer Arbersee und Arberseewand, CDDA no. 163348; designated in 1939; 1.4857 km^{2}) runs away to the southeast. Extending from the summit region to the northwest is the Little Arbersee Nature Reserve (Kleiner Arbersee, CDDA no. 164117; 1998; 4.1059 km^{2}). Near the mountain at the Riesloch Falls is the Riesloch nature reserve (CDDA no. 318989; 1939; 33.4 ha). On the mountain itself are parts of the protected landscapes of the Bavarian Forest (Bayerischer Wald, CDDA no. 396098; 1983; 2310.1276 km^{2}) and Upper Bavarian Forest (Oberer Bayerischer Wald, CDDA no. 396128 1308.5616 km^{2}), the Special Area of Conservation of the Great and Little Arber and Arber lakes (Großer und Kleiner Arber mit Arberseen, FFH no. 6844-373; 22.952 km^{2}) and the bird reserve of the Great and Little Arber and Schwarzeck (Großer und Kleiner Arber mit Schwarzeck, VSG no. 6844-471; 35.4624 km^{2}).

== Fauna and flora ==
The summit region of the Großer Arber does not rise above the natural tree line. Nevertheless, it is treeless and covered by subalpine calcareous grasses, rocky meadows (Felsfluren) and mountain pine bushes, which occur nowhere else in the Bavarian Forest. The characteristic bird species of this region include the meadow pipit, alpine accentor, water pipit, ring ouzel and wheatear. To the north in the direction of Lam there is farmer-managed, selection cutting forest (Plenterwald), in the south towards Bodenmais is state forest.

== Climate ==
=== Overview ===
Großer Arber has a subarctic climate (Köppen Dfc) bordering on humid continental climate (Köppen Dfb). The summit region of the Great Arber has an average of 160 days of frost and 150 days of snow cover per year. Because of late and early frosts, the vegetation period lasts little more than 100 days. The July temperature in the highest areas is 11 degrees. Of the approximately 1950 mm of annual precipitation, 40% falls as snow.

The lowest recorded temperature of -26.4 °C was measured on 12 January 1987. The highest temperature of 30.3 °C was measured on 27 July 1983. The highest snow cover was measured on 2 April 1988, when it reached 372 cm. The weather station has operated here since November 1982.

Climate data for Großer Arber: 1436m (1991−2020 normals, extremes 1982–present)
| Month | Jan | Feb | Mar | Apr | May | Jun | Jul | Aug | Sep | Oct | Nov | Dec | Year |
|---|---|---|---|---|---|---|---|---|---|---|---|---|---|
| Record high °C (°F) | 14.2 (57.6) | 12.8 (55.0) | 15.3 (59.5) | 21.3 (70.3) | 24.6 (76.3) | 27.3 (81.1) | 30.3 (86.5) | 28.5 (83.3) | 24.1 (75.4) | 21.2 (70.2) | 17.4 (63.3) | 14.2 (57.6) | 30.3 (86.5) |
| Mean daily maximum °C (°F) | −1.5 (29.3) | −1.6 (29.1) | 1.1 (34.0) | 6.0 (42.8) | 11.0 (51.8) | 14.4 (57.9) | 16.1 (61.0) | 16.1 (61.0) | 11.5 (52.7) | 7.6 (45.7) | 3.0 (37.4) | −0.5 (31.1) | 6.9 (44.5) |
| Daily mean °C (°F) | −3.8 (25.2) | −4.1 (24.6) | −1.6 (29.1) | 2.7 (36.9) | 7.1 (44.8) | 10.5 (50.9) | 12.3 (54.1) | 12.4 (54.3) | 8.3 (46.9) | 4.7 (40.5) | 0.5 (32.9) | −2.8 (27.0) | 3.9 (38.9) |
| Mean daily minimum °C (°F) | −6.2 (20.8) | −6.4 (20.5) | −4.0 (24.8) | −0.2 (31.6) | 4.0 (39.2) | 7.3 (45.1) | 9.2 (48.6) | 9.5 (49.1) | 5.8 (42.4) | 2.3 (36.1) | −1.9 (28.6) | −5.0 (23.0) | 1.2 (34.2) |
| Record low °C (°F) | −26.4 (−15.5) | −22.3 (−8.1) | −19.6 (−3.3) | −13.6 (7.5) | −6.4 (20.5) | −2.5 (27.5) | 0.6 (33.1) | −0.2 (31.6) | −3.2 (26.2) | −10.3 (13.5) | −16.0 (3.2) | −23.1 (−9.6) | −26.4 (−15.5) |
| Average precipitation mm (inches) | 127.7 (5.03) | 111.5 (4.39) | 116.7 (4.59) | 75.5 (2.97) | 107.6 (4.24) | 133.3 (5.25) | 143.6 (5.65) | 139.3 (5.48) | 114.6 (4.51) | 120.2 (4.73) | 115.1 (4.53) | 149.6 (5.89) | 1,454.7 (57.26) |
| Average precipitation days (≥ 0.1 mm) | 19.1 | 17.9 | 18.5 | 15.4 | 17.5 | 17.6 | 17.6 | 15.9 | 14.9 | 15.6 | 16.8 | 19.9 | 207.6 |
| Average snowy days (≥ 1 cm) | 31.0 | 28.3 | 31.0 | 26.2 | 6.1 | 0.3 | 0.0 | 0.0 | 0.4 | 6.6 | 18.1 | 28.8 | 180.3 |
| Average relative humidity (%) | 83.1 | 82.9 | 83.9 | 79.1 | 78.9 | 80.2 | 79.7 | 79.7 | 84.2 | 81.9 | 81.8 | 82.8 | 81.5 |
Source 1: NOAA
Source 2: DWD (extremes)

=== Arbermandl ===
In winter, the east wind together with ice snow forms the so-called Arbermandl. The mountain pines and mountain spruces of the Great Arber freeze into bizarre and often comical-looking shapes. Cameraman Martin Lippl made a film about it in 1985. The recordings were made somewhat accidentally during a short break of sunshine during a blizzard. Elfie Pertramer later underscored these recordings with a mystical poem. Under the title Voices from the Magic Forest the film will be broadcast at the beginning of each year on Bavarian television in the programme Zwischen Spessart und Karwendel.

== History ==
Since the 19th century, the Großer Arber and the extended woodlands down to Bayerisch Eisenstein with several former forest glassworks were owned by the princely House of Hohenzollern-Sigmaringen. They procured the estate of the master glassworker, Hafenbrädl, in Böhmisch Eisenstein, later Markt Eisenstein, today Železná Ruda, and, in 1872, the estates in Bayerisch Eisenstein. In 1884, a wooden mountain hut was built by the Bavarian Forest Club. In 1903, the first hut was built on the summit. The current shingle-covered one was built in 1936 and extended in 1985.

As early as 1939, large parts of the area were put under protection, in order to save its uniqueness. During the Cold War, a military radar station was built at the top which is still in operation albeit at reduced level - see below.

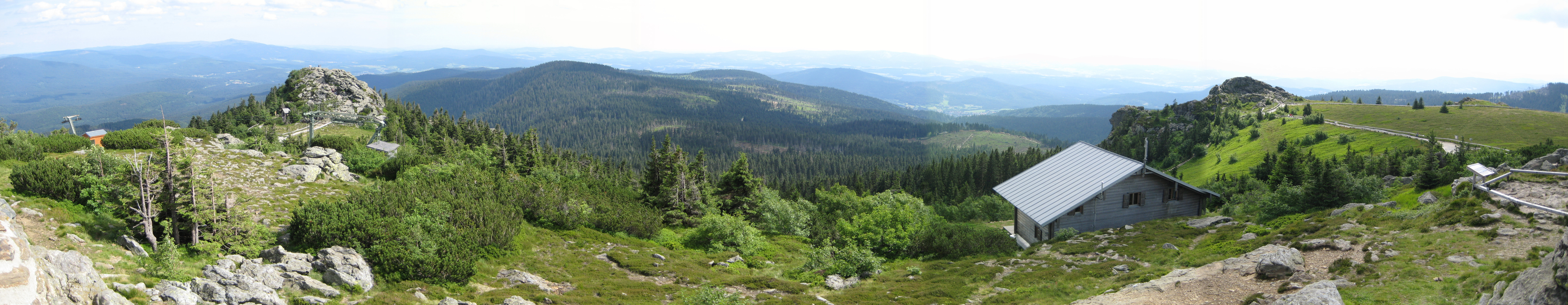
View from the summit looking south

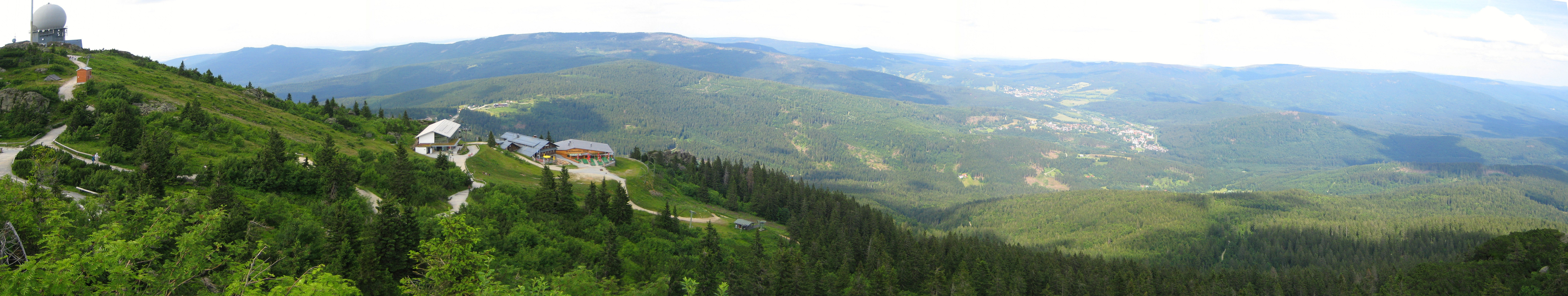
View from the summit looking north

== Arber Chapel and Arber parish fair ==
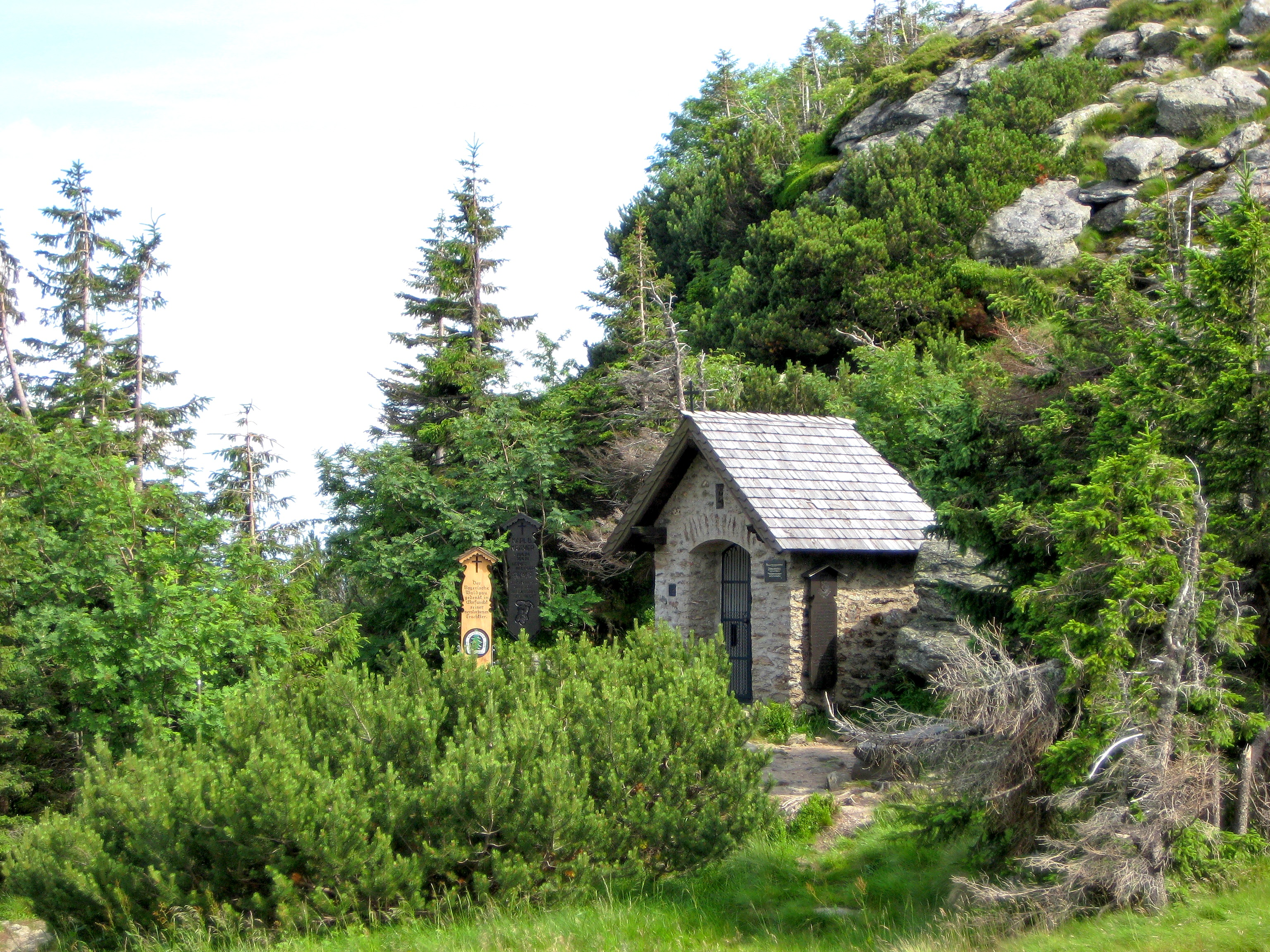
Arber Chapel

A little to the northwest and a few metres below the summit of the Great Arber stands the little Arber chapel dedicated to Saint Bartholomew the Apostle. The first chapel there was built in 1806 by the glassworks owner, Baron von Hafenbrädl. Since then the building has been renovated four times; the present one was built in 2015.

On the occasion of the centenary of the chapel's construction, Abbot Willibald Adam of Metten Abbey celebrated a mountain mass for the first time in the presence of 2,000 people on St. Bartholomew's Day in 1906. On 29 August 1965, the priest of Arber, Josef Kufner, celebrated another mass here, thus founding the first actual Arber parish fair (Arberkirchweih). Since then it has been celebrated every year on the penultimate Sunday in August. After mass, people meet for lunch in the Arber Hut; afterwards, folk singers and musicians give performances.

== Radar site ==
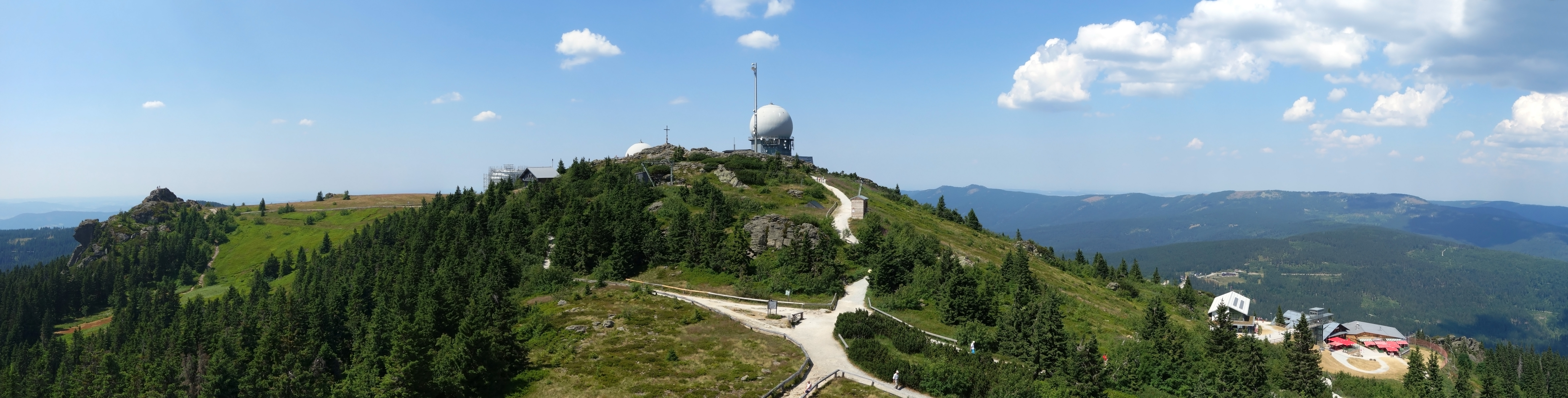
The Great Arber with its radome seen from the south

Two buildings owned by the German Air Force together with their radomes are situated on the summit. The site was built during the Cold War, in the face of vehement protests by conservationists, close to the border with Czechoslovakia in order to monitor air traffic in the Eastern Bloc. The facility entered service in 1983, originally with two radar antennas. In 1996, it was converted and equipped with a large-capacity RRP 117 radar. Since then, the second tower has contained the transmitting and receiving antennas for radio communications. The Great Arber Air Defence Base is operated as part of the Integrated NATO Air Defence System.

== Sport and leisure ==
=== Hiking trails ===
A footpath runs from Bodenmais to the top of the mountain. It begins at the walkers' car park of Rissloch and climbs up past the Riesloch Falls. The descent may be made past the Little Arber, past the waterfalls and ending back at the start. In addition, there are two tours - the Eight Thousanders Tour ("8-1000er Tour") and the Twelve Thousanders Tour ("12-1000er Tour") - which are hiking trails that include an ascent of the mountain along the E6 European long distance path as part of a walk that take in eight or twelve 1,000-metre-high mountains respectively.

=== Arberland Mountain Run ===
On 10 June 2017 the Arberland Mountain Run took place, which also included the 2017 German Mountain Running Championships. 346 runners reached the finish line of the 13.8-kilometre course with a difference in altitude of 887 metres.

=== Arber Bergbahn and winter sports ===
The lifts on the Grosser Arber are called the Arber Bergbahn. The mountain has been turned into a winter sports area with several ski pistes. On 17 September 1949, the first chairlift was opened on the mountain. The systematic renewal of the lifts in recent years, the construction of a 6-seater gondola lift and the construction of two, six-seater chair lifts have made the mountain's ski area the most modern in the Bavarian Forest. In summer operation, the gondolas transport hikers and tourists to the summit.

Slalom and giant slalom competitions have been held on the mountain for the Alpine Ski European Cup since 1973 and, for the Alpine Ski World Cup, since 1976. The races were sponsored by the German Ski Association and alternated between Ofterschwang, Zwiesel and Berchtesgaden. Since 2011, no more ski world cups have taken place there, and according to the responsible organising committee, no further races are planned for the foreseeable future.
