= Bavarian Forest Nature Park =

Nature park in Bavaria, Germany

Coordinates: 48.895356°N 13.150574°E

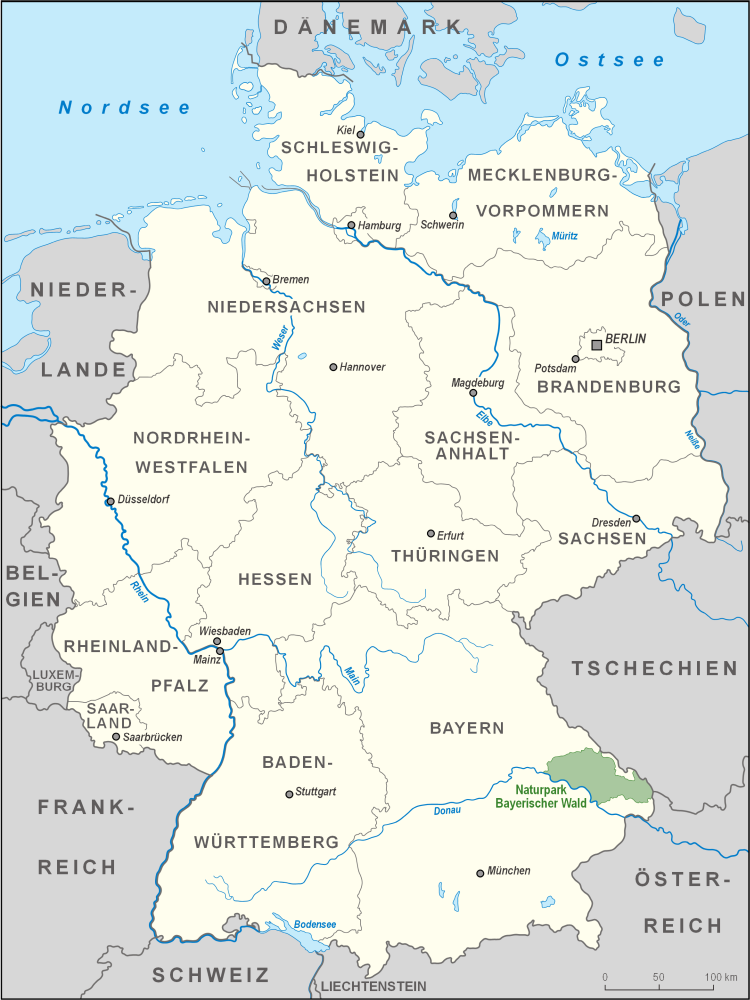
Location of the nature park in Germany

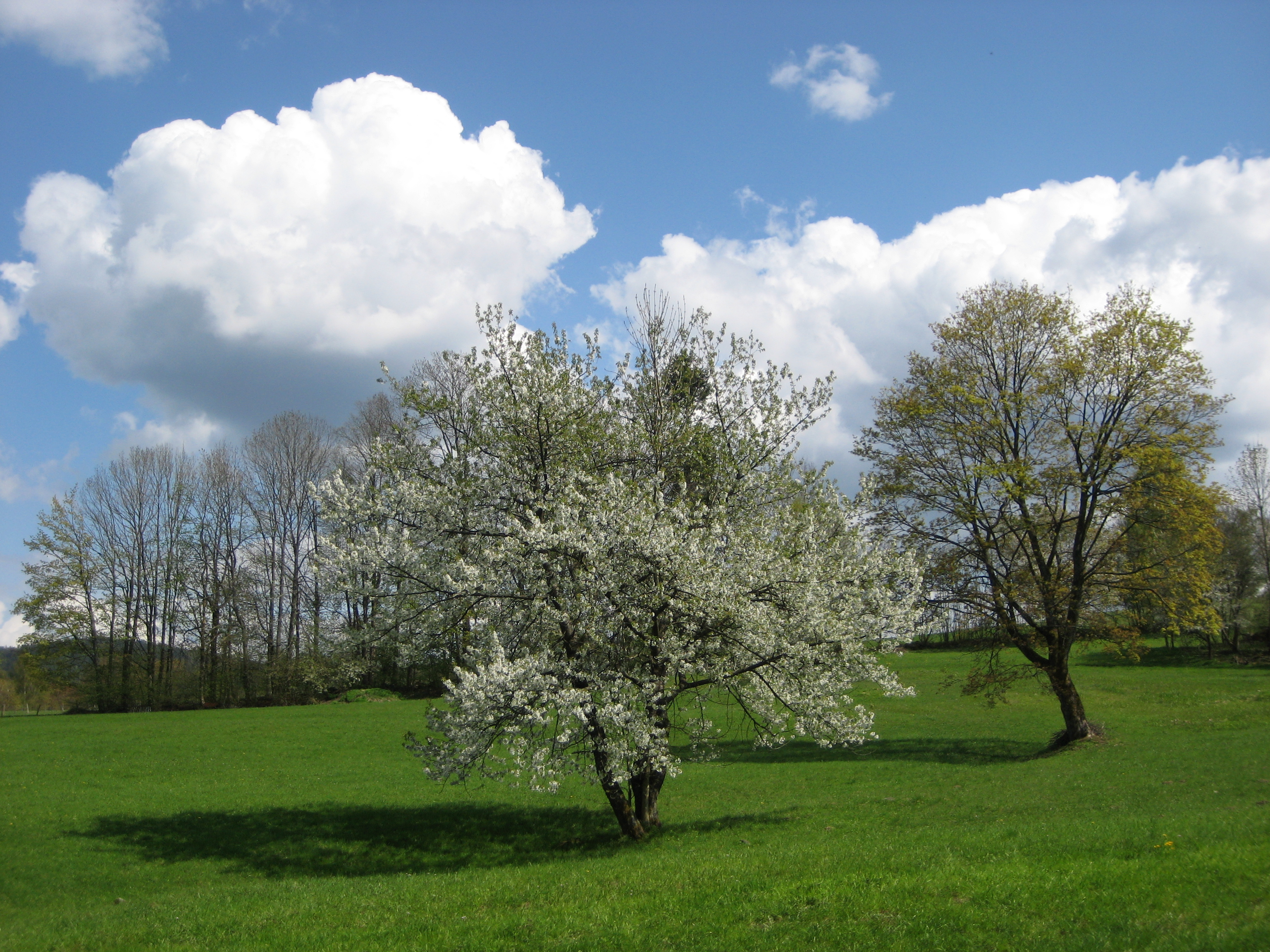
Bavarian Forest Nature Park bei Ruhmannsfelden

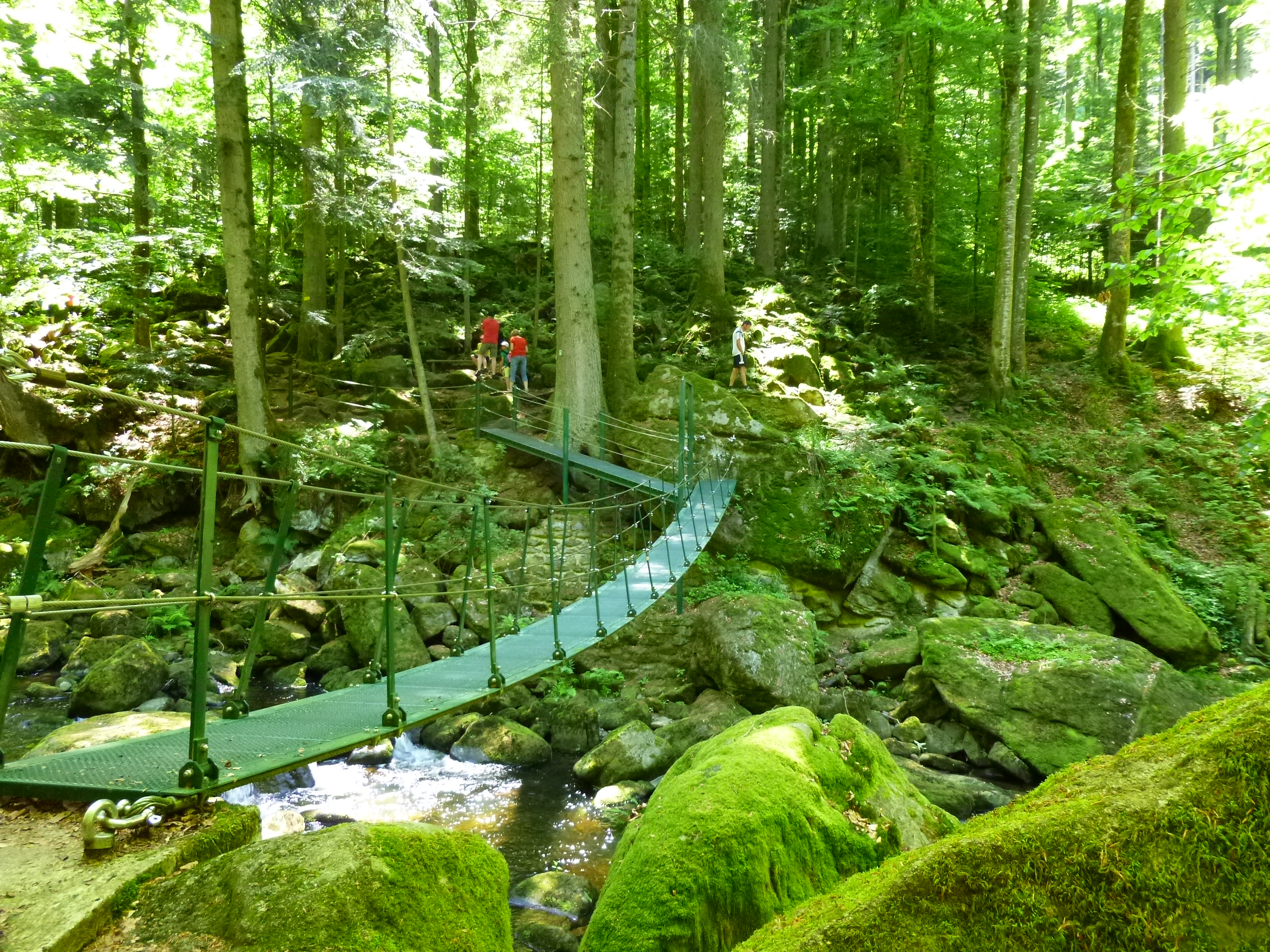
Suspension bridge in the Buchberger Leite in the nature park

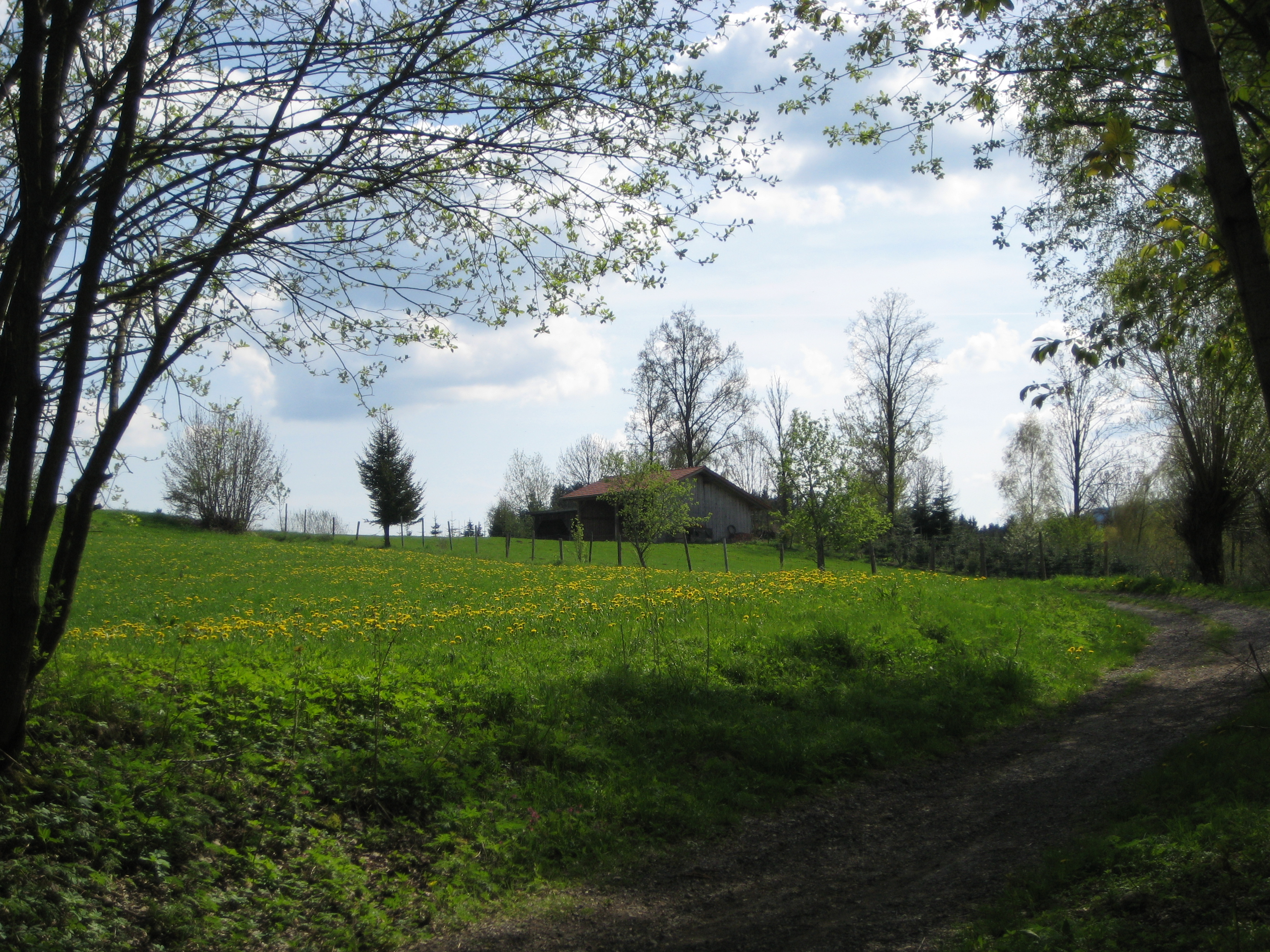
Countryside near Ruhmannsfelden

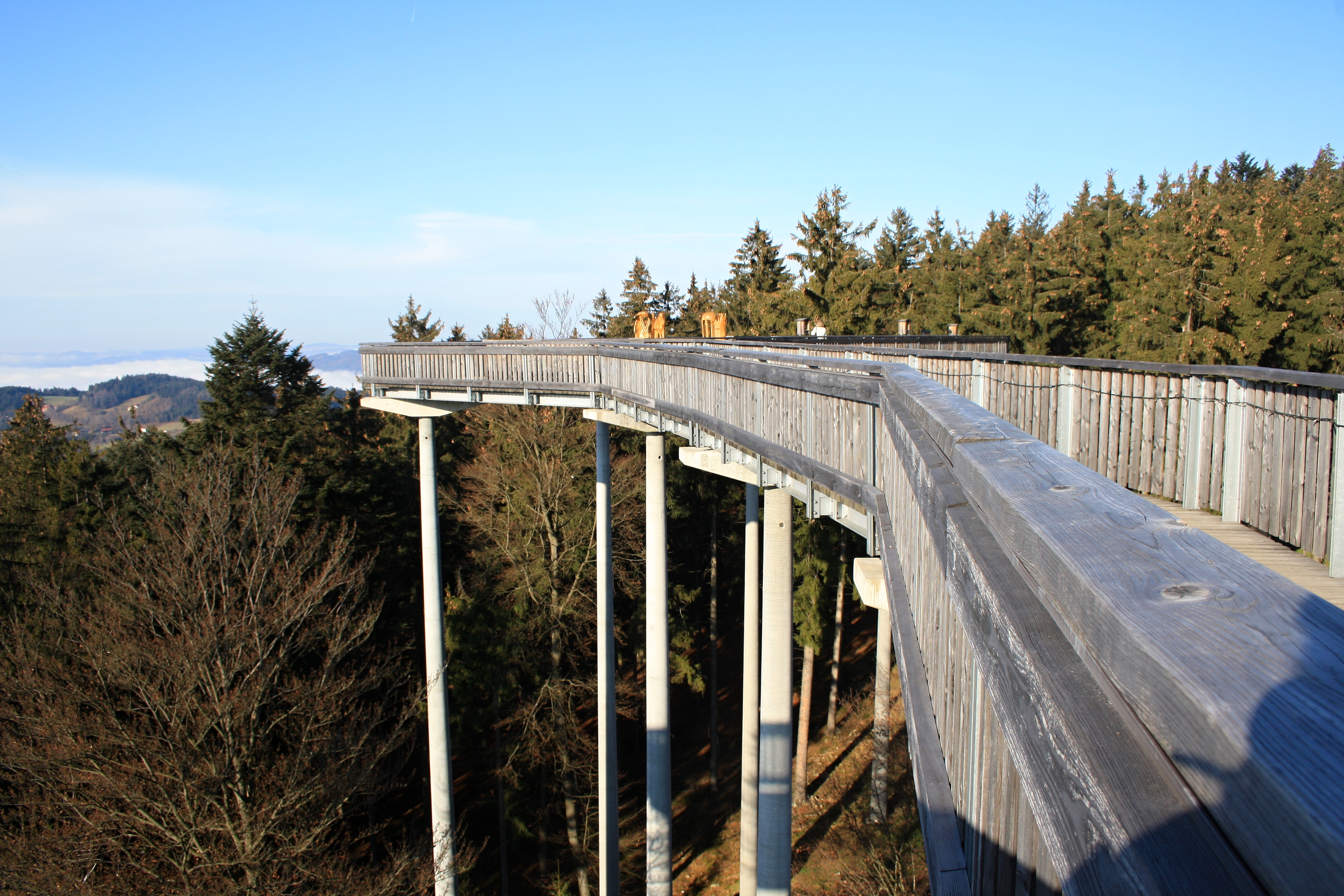
Treetop walk in Sankt Englmar-Maibrunn

The Bavarian Forest Nature Park (German: Naturpark Bayerischer Wald) covers an area north of the Danube as far as the border ridge with the Czech Republic. Its sponsor organisation is the Naturpark Bayerischer Wald whose head office is in Zwiesel, Bavaria. It was established in 1967 and is thus the oldest nature park in Bavaria.

== Location ==
The Bavarian Forest Nature Park lies in the southeast of Germany between the Danube and the highlands of the Bavarian Forest along the Bavarian-Bohemian border. In the east it is adjoined by the Bavarian Forest National Park and in the north by the Upper Bavarian Forest Nature Park. Its neighbouring protected areas on the Czech side of the border are the Bohemian Forest (Šumava) Protected Area and Bohemian Forest National Park. In the southeast the area of the nature park borders on the Upper Austrian district of Mühlviertel.

== Natural region ==
The territory of the Bavarian Forest Nature Park begins at the Danube at a height of about 320-metres above sea level. Here there are the last remains of riparian woodland and structurally rich ox-bow lakes. The Lallinger Winkel is well known for its scattered orchards. On the anterior chain of the Bavarian Forest, the so-called Danube Hills, the last examples of the threatened capercaillie still survive, as they do in the highlands of the inner Bavarian Forest.

An ecologically very rich rock formation is the Pfahl. It runs in a southeasterly direction for about 140 kilometres from the neighbouring Bavarian province of Upper Palatinate to the state of Upper Austria. The weather resistant quartz rock protrudes above the surrounding gneisses by several metres and offers a habitat for many warmth-loving animal and plant species. In the Inner Bavarian Forest there are still structure-rich mixed mountain woodlands and the typical highland spruce forests with raised bogs and areas of Schachten, the last relicts of mountain pasture.

The Bavarian Forest is part of the largest contiguous forest in Central Europe and, together with the neighbouring Bohemian Forest, is of outstanding importance for nature and landscape conservation. The partly near-natural woods in the border region and the attractive, historical cultural landscape make the Bavarian Forest Nature Park an important component in the conservation of major landscapes.

Numerous animal and plant species which have become very rare or are threatened with extinction in Bavaria and Germany as a whole, have found their last refuge areas in this region.

== See also ==
- List of nature parks in Germany
- Bavarian Forest Club
