= Lam, Bavaria =

Lam
- Municipality
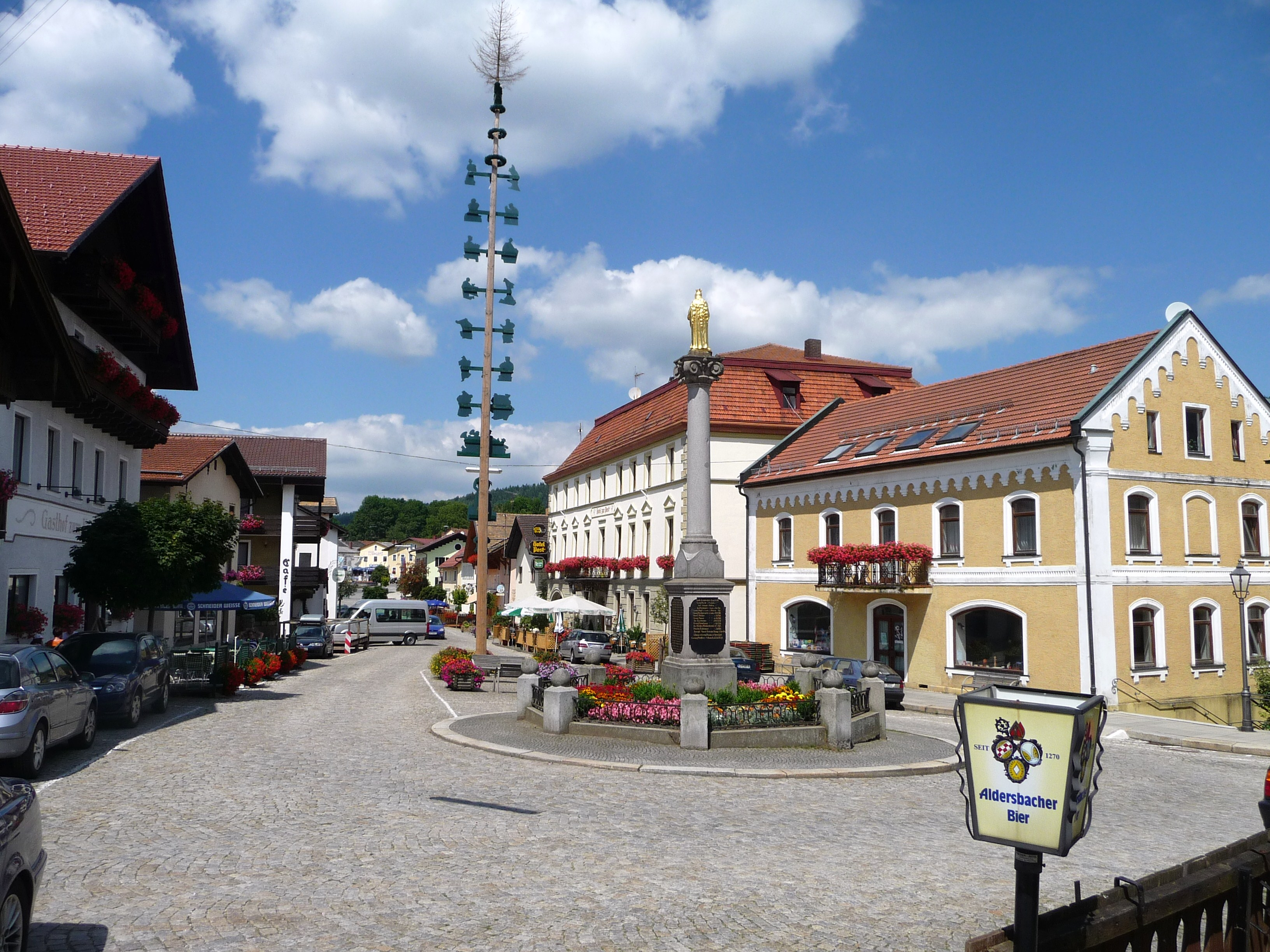
- Market square

- Coat of arms

- Location of Lam within Cham district
- Interactive map of Lam
- Location within Germany Location within Bavaria
- Coordinates: 49°12′N 13°3′E
- Country: Germany
- State: Bavaria
- Admin. region: Oberpfalz
- District: Cham

Government
  - Mayor (2020–26): Paul Roßberger jun. (CSU)

Area
  - Total: 33.38 km^{2} (12.89 sq mi)
- Elevation: 485–1,293 m (1,591–4,242 ft)

Population (2025-12-31)
  - Total: 2,585
  - Density: 77.44/km^{2} (200.6/sq mi)
- Time zone: UTC+01:00 (CET)
  - Summer (DST): UTC+02:00 (CEST)
- Postal codes: 93462
- Dialling codes: 0 99 43
- Vehicle registration: CHA
- Website: www.lam.de

Lam (German pronunciation: [laːm]) is a municipality in the district of Cham in Bavaria in Germany. It lies within the scenic valley of the Lamer Winkel.

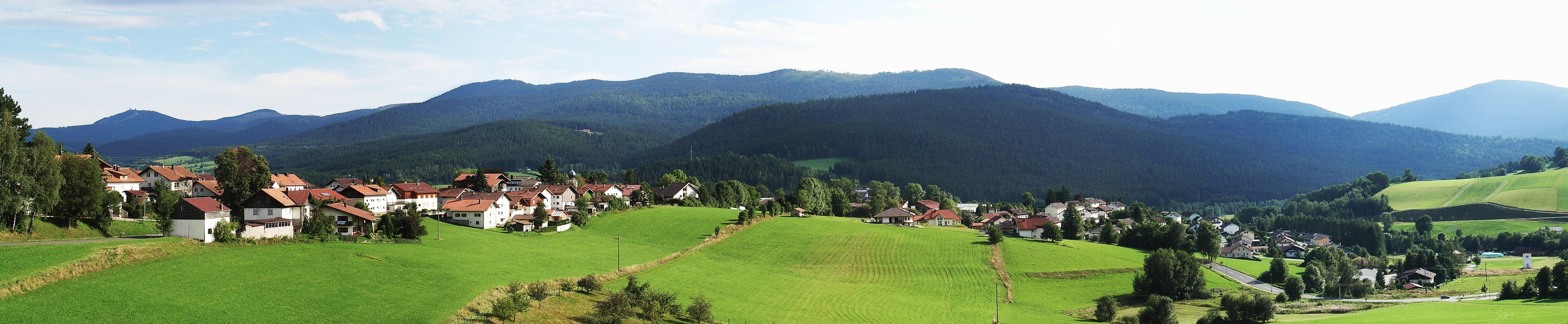
Panorama of Lam

== People ==
- Gabriele Krone-Schmalz (born 1949), German journalist
