= Kleiner Arbersee =

Lake in Lohberg, Bavaria, Germany

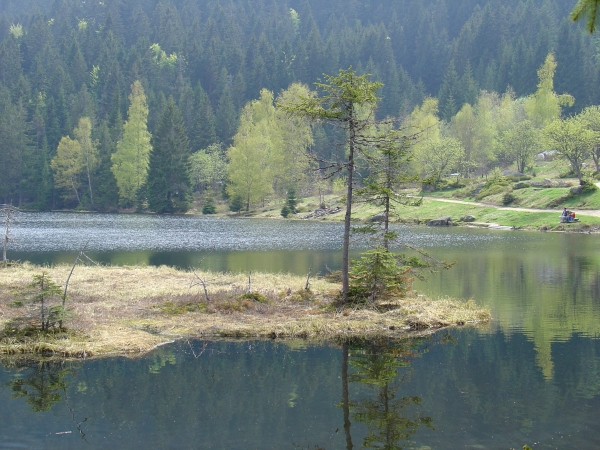

- Location within Bavaria
- Location: Bavarian Forest, Bavaria
- Coordinates: 49°07′35″N 13°07′10″E
- Primary inflows: Seebach
- Primary outflows: Weißer Regen
- Catchment area: 2.79 km^{2} (1.08 sq mi)
- Basin countries: Germany
- Max. length: 576 m (1,890 ft)
- Max. width: 195 m (640 ft)
- Surface area: 9.4 ha (23 acres)
- Average depth: 2.7 m (8 ft 10 in)
- Max. depth: 9 m (30 ft)
- Water volume: 250,000 m^{3} (8,800,000 cu ft)
- Surface elevation: 918 m (3,012 ft)

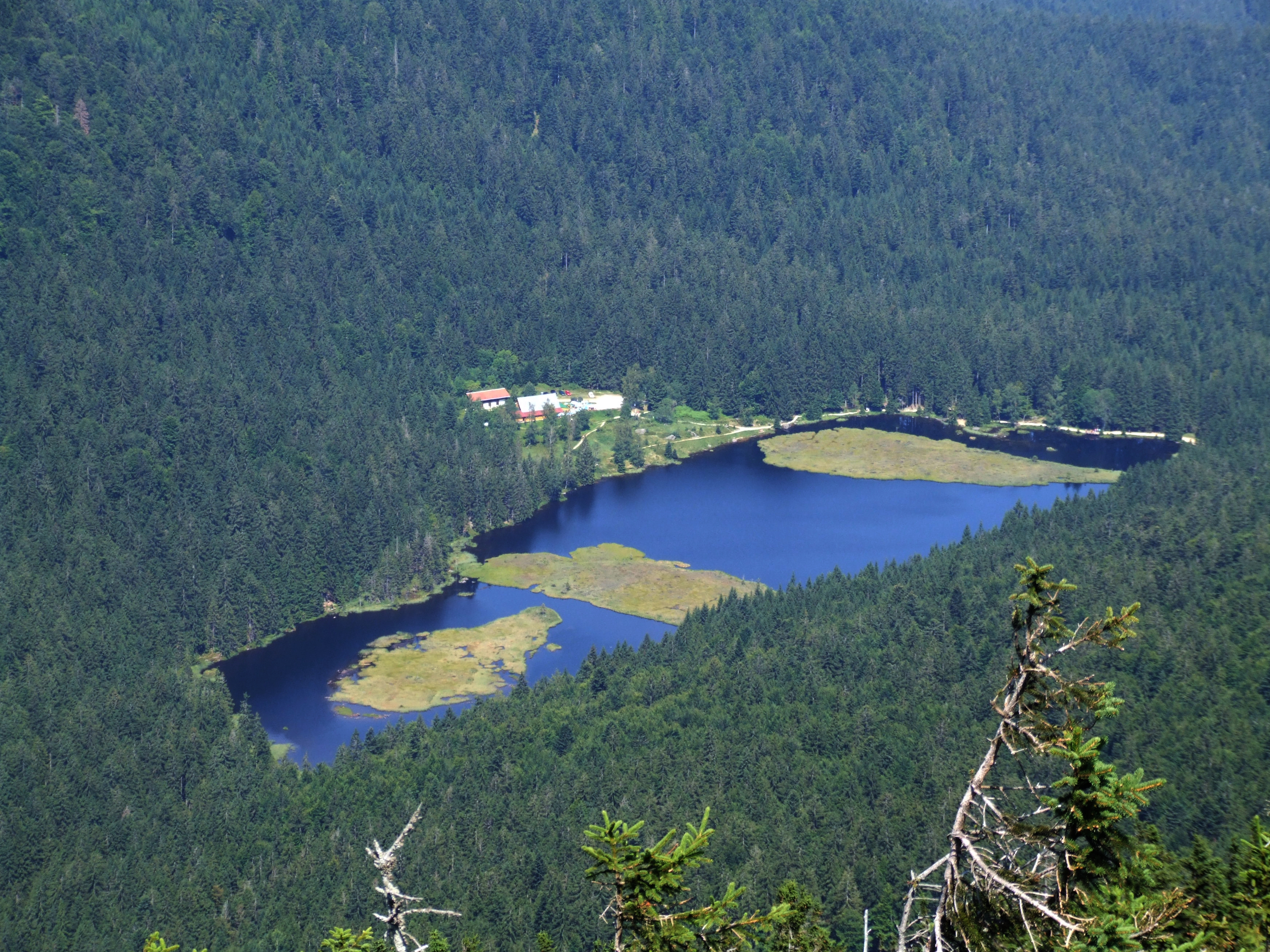
Kleiner Arbersee with the three floating islands

Kleiner Arbersee is a lake in the Bavarian Forest, Bavaria, Germany. It lies at an elevation of 918 m and has a surface area of 9.4 ha.
