= Zwercheck =

Mountain in Germany

- Svaroh
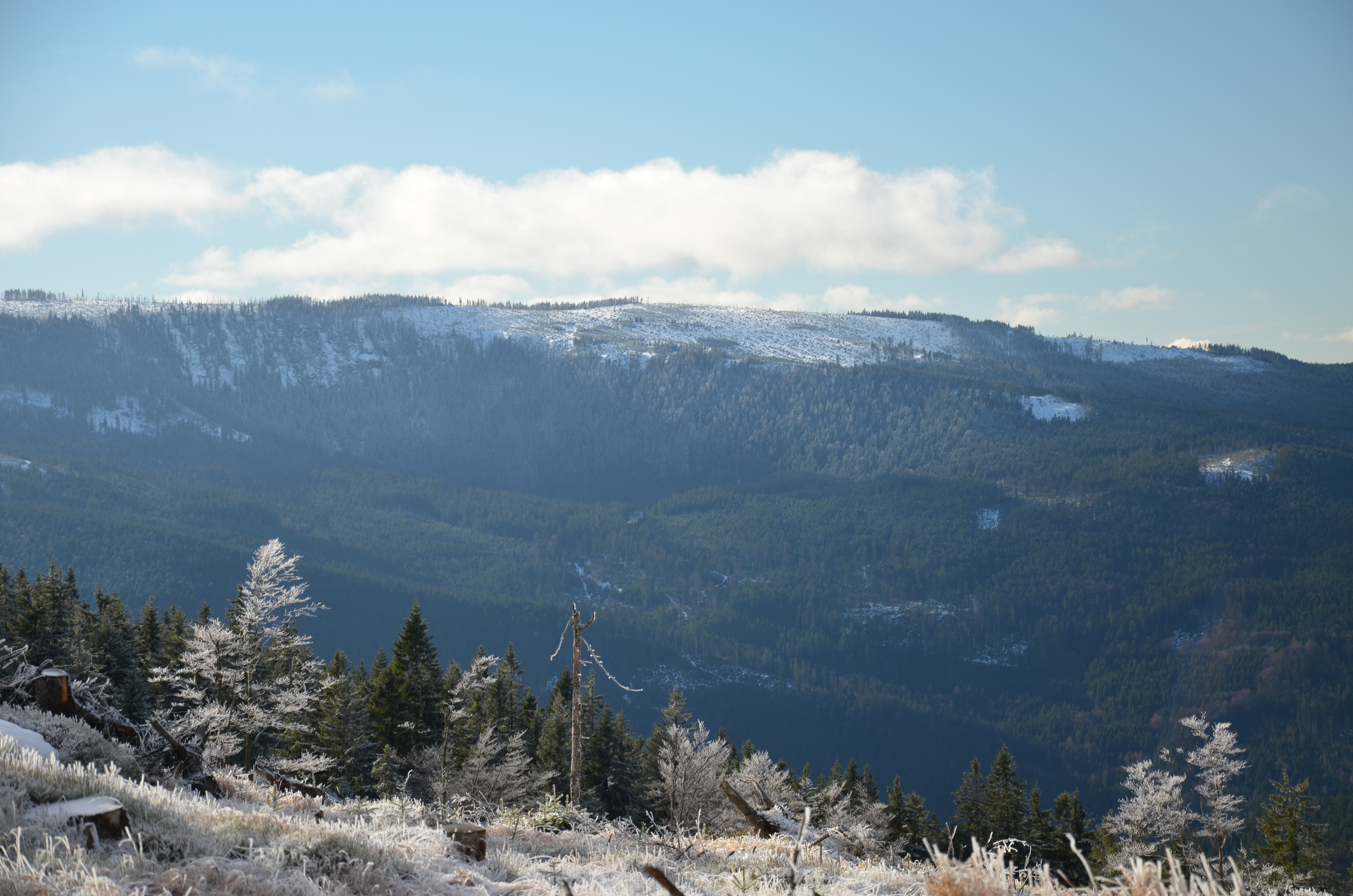
- view from northeast

Highest point
- Elevation: 1,333 m (4,373 ft)
- Listing: Mountains of Bavaria; Mountains of the Czech Republic
- Coordinates: 49°10′20″N 13°10′00″E

Geography
- Location within Bavaria Location within Czech Republic
- Countries: Germany and Czech Republic
- State: Bavaria

Zwercheck (Czech: Svaroh) is a mountain of the Bavarian Forest (German: Bayerischer Wald) and Bohemian Forest (Czech: Šumava) on the border between Germany and the Czech Republic.
