= Lohberg =

- Municipality
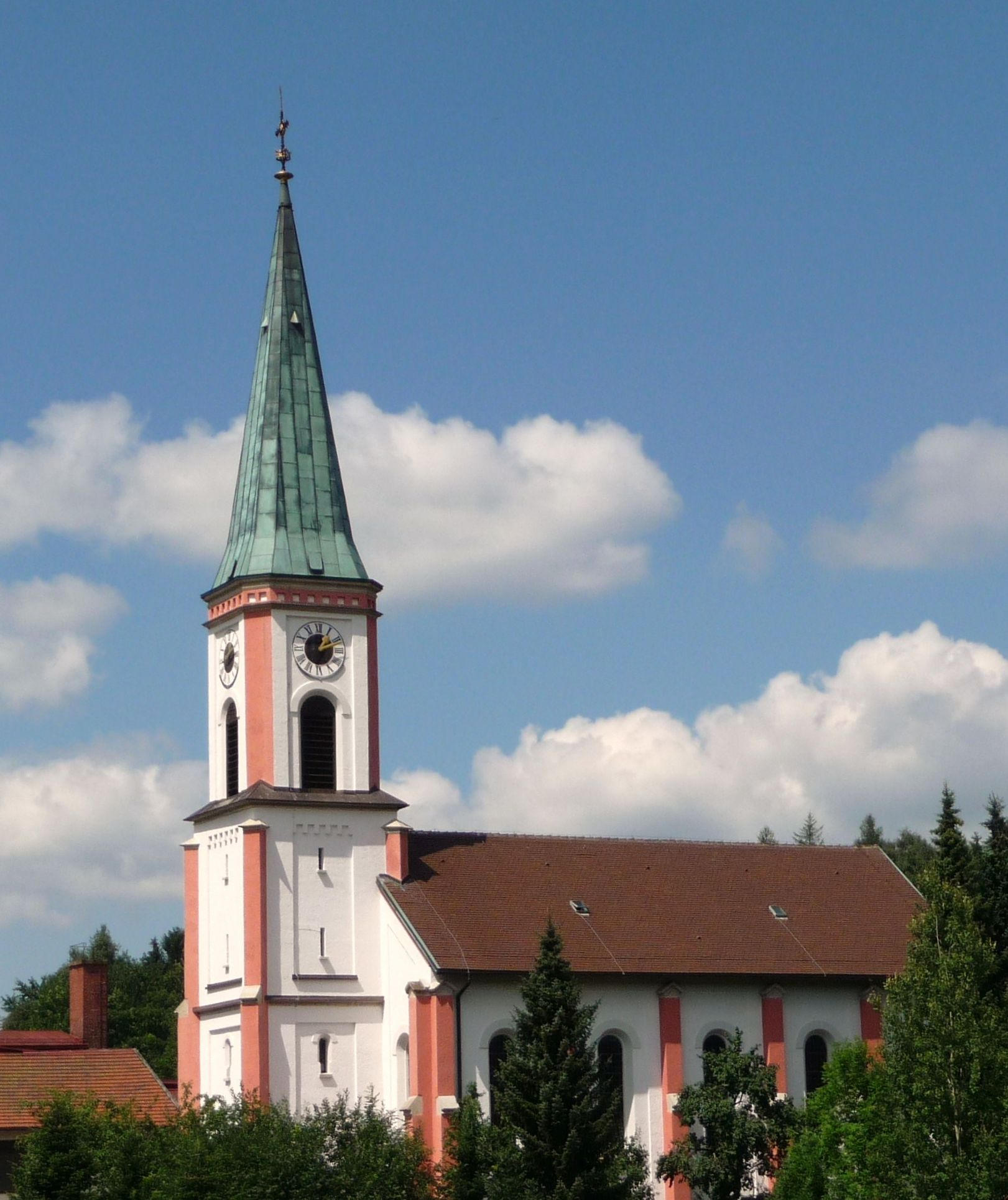
- Saint Walburga Church

- Coat of arms

- Location of Lohberg within Cham district
- Interactive map of Lohberg
- Location within Germany Location within Bavaria
- Coordinates: 49°11′N 13°6′E
- Country: Germany
- State: Bavaria
- Admin. region: Oberpfalz
- District: Cham

Government
  - Mayor (2020–26): Franz Xaver Müller (CSU)

Area
  - Total: 59.24 km^{2} (22.87 sq mi)
- Elevation: 636 m (2,087 ft)

Population (2025-12-31)
  - Total: 1,744
  - Density: 29.44/km^{2} (76.25/sq mi)
- Time zone: UTC+01:00 (CET)
  - Summer (DST): UTC+02:00 (CEST)
- Postal codes: 93470
- Dialling codes: 0 99 43
- Vehicle registration: CHA
- Website: www.lohberg.de

Lohberg (German pronunciation: [ˈloːbɛʁk]) is a municipality in the district of Cham in Bavaria in Germany. It lies within the scenic valley of the Lamer Winkel.
