= Upper Palatinate =

Administrative district in Bavaria, Germany

Upper Palatinate Oberpfalz (German)
- Regierungsbezirk
- Flag Coat of arms

- Map of Bavaria highlighting Upper Palatinate
- Coordinates: 49.3°N 12.2°E
- Country: Germany
- State: Bavaria
- Region seat: Regensburg

Government
  - District President: Franz Löffler (CSU)

Area
  - Total: 9,692.23 km^{2} (3,742.19 sq mi)

Population (31 December 2025)
  - Total: 1,120,630
  - Density: 115.621/km^{2} (299.458/sq mi)

GDP
  - Total: €51.234 billion (2021)
- Website: regierung.oberpfalz.bayern.de

The Upper Palatinate (/pəˈlætɪnɪt/; German: Oberpfalz, pronounced [ˈoːbɐˌpfalts], Bavarian: Obapfoiz, Owerpfolz) is an administrative region in the east of Bavaria, Germany. It consists of seven districts and 226 municipalities, including three cities.

== Geography ==
The Upper Palatinate is a landscape with low mountains and numerous ponds and lakes in its lowland regions. By contrast with other regions of Germany it is more rural in character and more sparsely settled. It borders (clockwise from the north) on Upper Franconia, the Czech Republic, Lower Bavaria, Upper Bavaria and Middle Franconia.

Notable regions are:

- Stiftland, former estate and territorial lordship of Waldsassen Abbey with the market town of Konnersreuth, Fockenfeld Abbey, the town of Waldsassen and about 150 other villages.
- Upper Palatine Forest with deep valleys and many castles
- Upper Palatine Lake District with the Steinberger See
- Upper Palatine Jura, part of the Franconian Jura
- Steinwald including the Teichelberg and Pechbrunn
- Waldnaab/Wondreb Depression
- Bavarian Forest, together with the Bohemian Forest a large-scale protected area. A rock outcrop west of the summit cross of the Großer Arber (1,455.5 m above sea level (NHN)) is 1,439.6 m, the highest point in Upper Palatinate.
- Kunisch Mountains
- Naab valley
- Vils valley
- Danube valley, western part of the Gäuboden
- Lower Bavarian Hills south of the Danube

== History ==
At the beginning of the High Middle Ages the region now known as the Upper Palatinate was part of the Bavarian March of the Nordgau. The region took its current name no earlier than the early 14th century.

From the mid-13th century, much of the region was controlled by the Wittelsbach dynasty and until 1329 was ruled by the Wittelsbach Elector Palatine as part of the larger County Palatine of the Rhine (German: Pfalzgrafschaft bei Rhein). By the 1329 Treaty of Pavia, the Wittelsbach territories were divided between two branches of the dynasty. The territory around the Rhine river in the west became known as the Rhenish Palatinate (German: Rheinpfalz) or Lower Palatinate, and is today usually known simply as the Palatinate (German: Pfalz); it is from this territory that the modern German state of Rhineland-Palatinate derives its name. By contrast, the territory to the east centred on Amberg became known as the Upper Palatinate (German: Oberpfalz), upper and lower in this case referring to the elevation of the territories (compare Low and High German languages, Upper and Lower Lusatia, Upper and Lower Lorraine, Low Countries, Lower Saxony).

Cadet branches of the Wittelsbach dynasty also ruled over smaller territories in Neuburg and Sulzbach. As a result of the Elector Palatine Frederick V's abortive claim to the Bohemian throne in 1619–1620, the Upper Palatinate, along with the rest of his lands, were declared forfeit to the Emperor and, along with the Electoral title, given to the Duke of Bavaria. Although the Lower Palatinate was restored to Frederick's son by the Peace of Westphalia in 1648, the Upper Palatinate remained under the Elector of Bavaria, and has remained a part of Bavaria ever since. The smaller territories of Neuburg and Sulzbach came to Bavaria in 1777 when Charles Theodore, Elector Palatine inherited the Bavarian lands of his Wittelsbach cousin Maximilian III Joseph, Elector of Bavaria. The city of Regensburg, an Imperial Free City, was not joined with the rest of the region until the end of the Holy Roman Empire in 1806 and the end of the short-lived Principality of Regensburg under Carl von Dalberg, which existed from 1803 to 1810.

After the founding of the Kingdom of Bavaria, the state was totally reorganised, and in 1808, divided into 15 administrative districts (German: Regierungsbezirke; singular Regierungsbezirk) called Kreise (literally "Circles", singular: Kreis). They were created in the fashion of the French departments, quite even in size and population, and named after their main rivers. In the following years, due to territorial changes (e.g. the loss of Tyrol, the addition of the Palatinate), the number of Kreise in the kingdom was reduced to 8. One of these was the Regenkreis (Regen District). In 1837, king Ludwig I of Bavaria renamed the Kreise after historical territorial names and tribes of the area. This also involved some border changes or territorial swaps. Thus, the district name of Regenkreis was changed to Upper Palatinate.

== Districts ==
Landkreise (districts):

- Amberg-Sulzbach
- Cham
- Neumarkt
- Neustadt an der Waldnaab
- Regensburg
- Schwandorf
- Tirschenreuth

Kreisfreie Städte (district-free towns):

- Amberg
- Regensburg
- Weiden in der Oberpfalz

== Population ==
Historical Population of Upper Palatinate:

- 1900: 553,841
- 1910: 600,284
- 1939: 694,742
- 1950: 906,822
- 1961: 898,580
- 1970: 963,833
- 1987: 969,868
- 2002: 1,088,929
- 2005: 1,089,543
- 2006: 1,087,939
- 2008: 1,085,216
- 2010: 1,081,206
- 2015: 1,092,339
- 2019: 1,112,102

== Economy ==
The gross domestic product (GDP) of the region was €47.3 billion in 2018, accounting for 1.4% of German economic output. GDP per capita adjusted for purchasing power was €39,200 or 130% of the EU27 average in the same year. The GDP per employee was 103% of the EU average.

== Main sights ==
Major tourist attractions include the former ducal residences Regensburg with the Walhalla nearby and Amberg, the city of Weiden and Waldsassen Abbey including the Kappl Trinity church nearby. Scenic attractions include the river Danube and the Upper Palatine Forest. A sight is also the town of Neumarkt and the pilgrim church of Maria Hilf in Freystadt nearby.

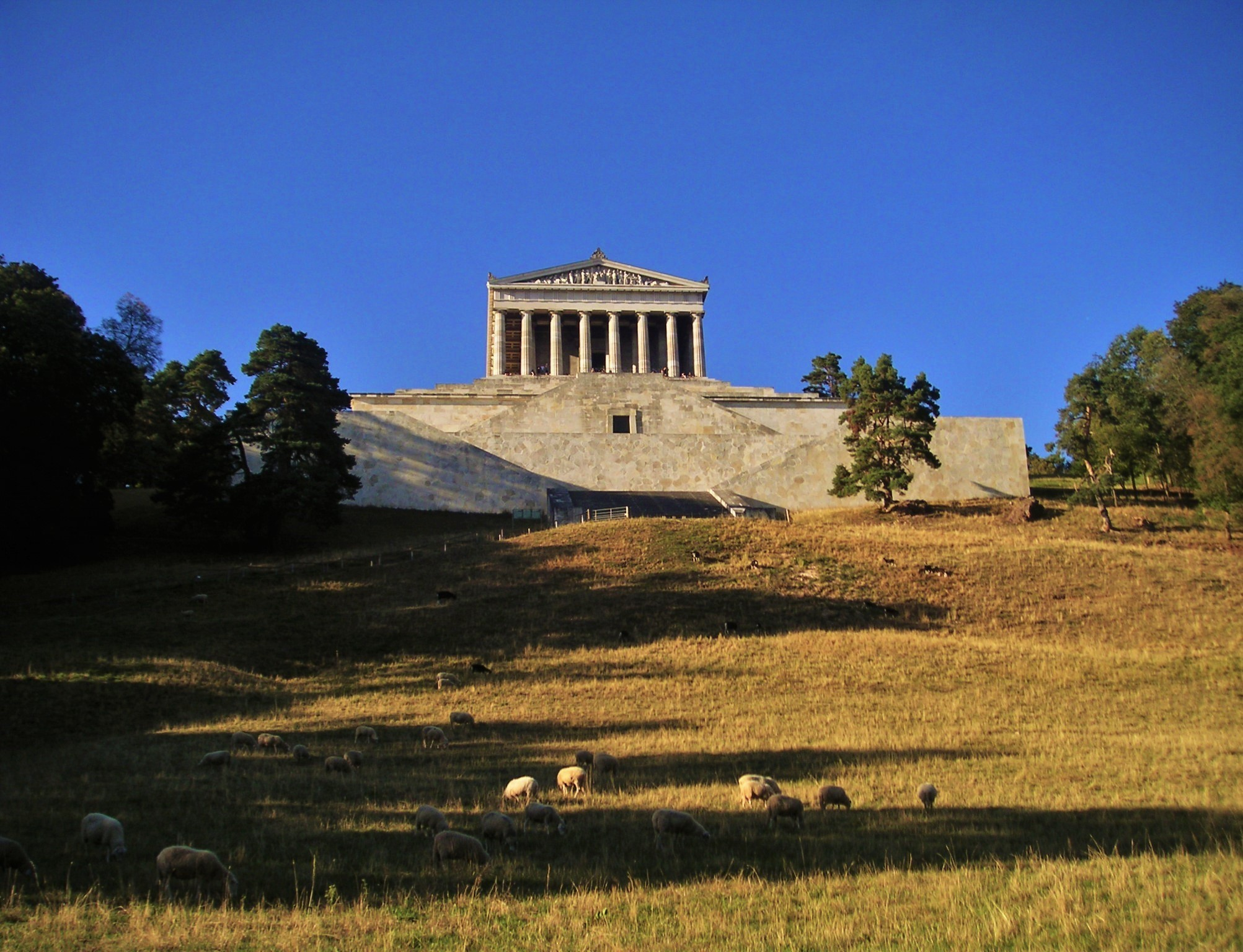
Walhalla memorial

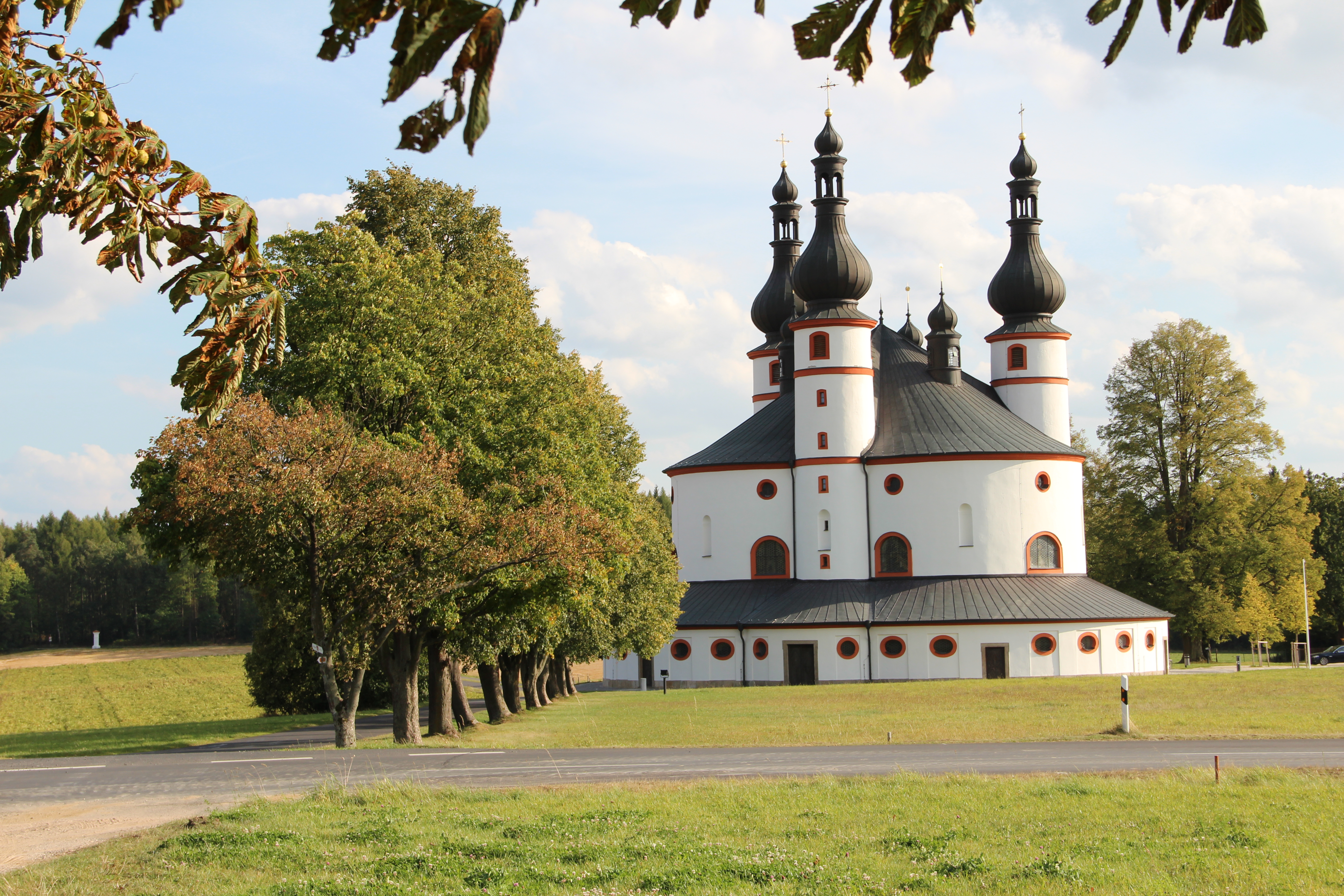
Trinity church of Kappl

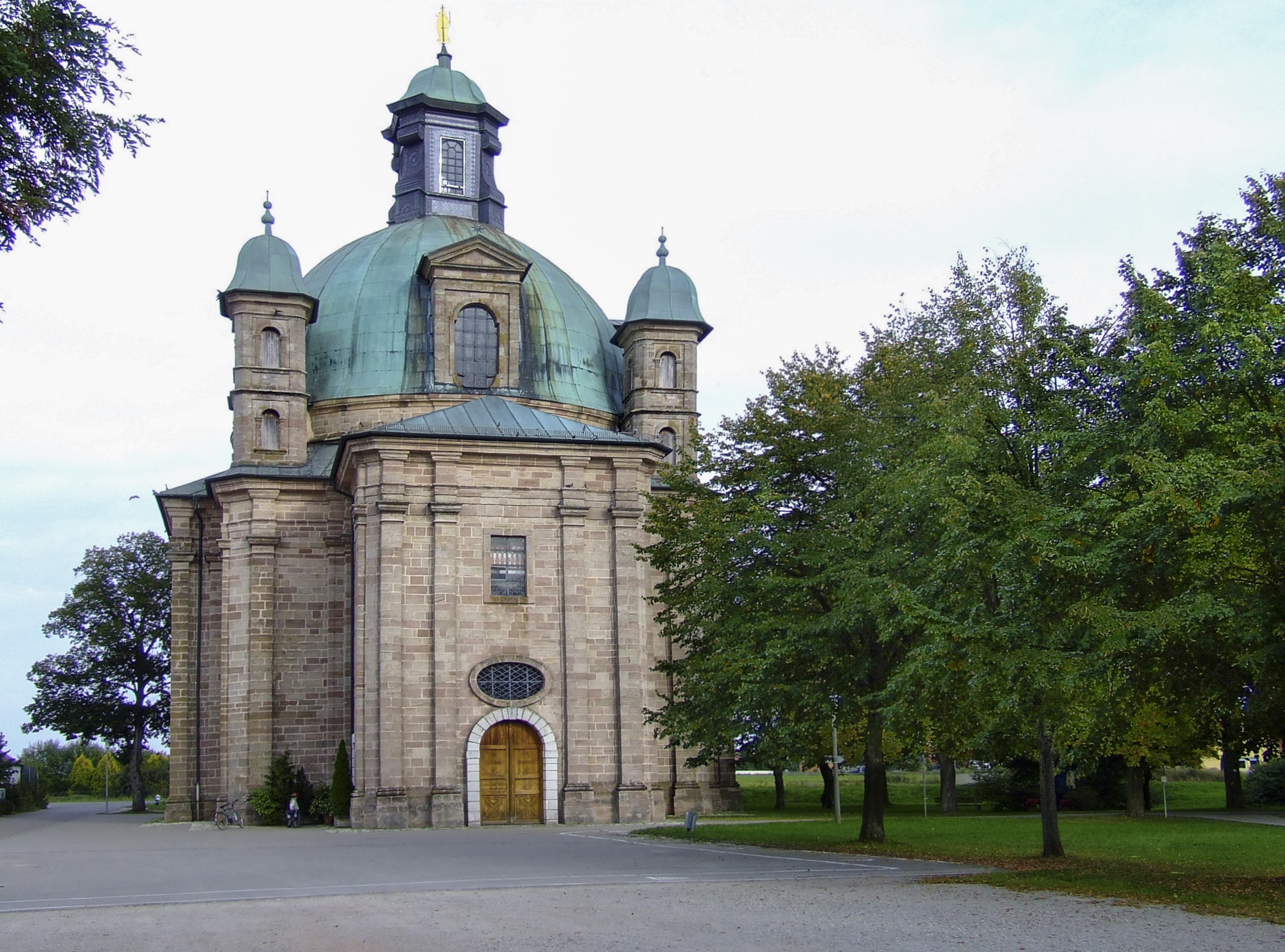
Maria-Hilf

== See also ==
- Lower Palatinate
