= Kopanina =

Kopanina may refer to the following places in Poland:

- Kopanina, part of the Grunwald district of Poznań
- Kopanina, Leszno County in Greater Poland Voivodeship (west-central Poland)
- Kopanina, Szamotuły County in Greater Poland Voivodeship (west-central Poland)
- Kopanina, Wągrowiec County in Greater Poland Voivodeship (west-central Poland)
- Kopanina, Piotrków County in Łódź Voivodeship (central Poland)
- Kopanina, Sieradz County in Łódź Voivodeship (central Poland)
- Kopanina, Lower Silesian Voivodeship (south-west Poland)
- Kopanina, Opole Voivodeship (south-west Poland)
- Kopanina, Silesian Voivodeship (south Poland)
- Kopanina, Świętokrzyskie Voivodeship (south-central Poland)
