= Julia Leischik =

German television producer and presenter

- Born: 14 October 1970 (age 55); Cologne, West Germany
- Occupations: television presenter television producer Editor-in-chief
- Years active: 2003 - present

Julia Leischik (born 14 October 1970) is a German television presenter, television producer and editor-in-chief.

== Life ==
Leischick grew up in Upper Palatinate (Cham), and is mother of one daughter.

=== Television career ===
In autumn 2003 she went to the Endemol Deutschland GmbH, where they broadcast "Vermisst" (en: Missing) which she codeveloped and presented. Since the beginning of 2010 she was Executive Producer for "Vermisst' on RTL. From January till the middle of 2011 she presented "Verzeih mir" (en: Forgive me) which resembled "Vermisst".

For the season beginning 2011/2012 Leischik changed to Sat.1. There she became the face of the new show "Julia Leischik sucht: Bitte melde dich" (en: Julia Leischik searching: "Please get in touch"). The network also presented two episodes of the series "Zeugen gesucht — mit Julia Leischik" (en: Witnesses sought — with Julia Leischik).

Editor-in-chief
Year	Area	Production company
1998 - 1999	Talk	Voice Company
1999 - 2003	Document Fiction formats and court endings	Filmpool
Television producer
1999 - 2003	Document Fiction formats and court endings	Filmpool
2003–present	Factual Entertainment	Endemol Deutschland GmbH
Television presenter (Host)
Year	Title	Channel
2007 - 2011	Vermisst	RTL
2011	Verzeih mir	RTL
2011	Vermisst Spezial - Spurlos verschwunden	RTL
2012	Zeugen gesucht - mit Julia Leischik	Sat.1
2012–present	Julia Leischik sucht: Bitte melde dich	Sat.1
