= Gerhard Hopp =

German politician (born 1981)

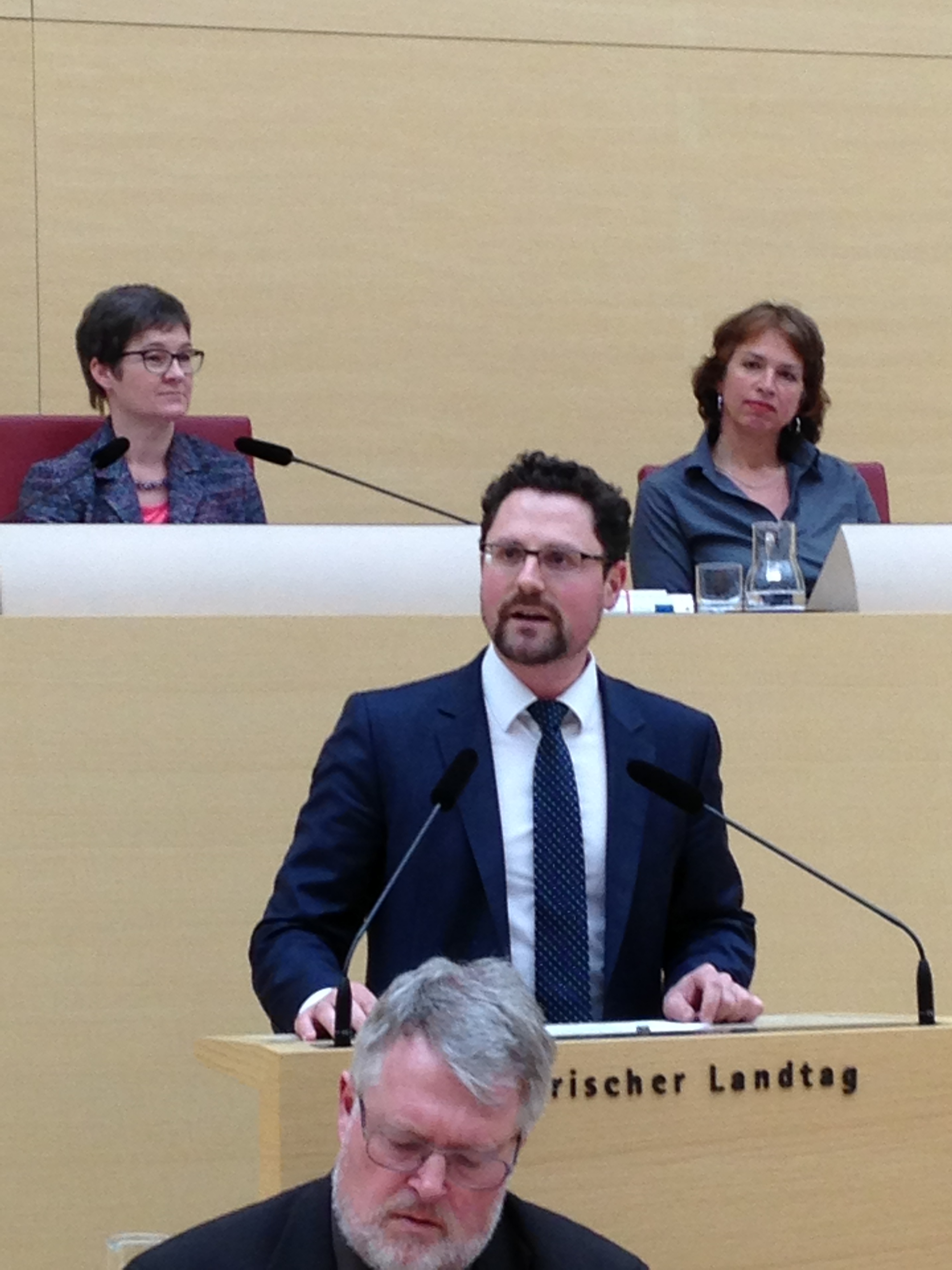
- Hopp in 2014

Member of the Landtag of Bavaria
- Incumbent
- Assumed office 7 October 2013
- Preceded by: Markus Sackmann
- Constituency: Cham

Personal details
- Born: 13 February 1981 (age 45) Cham
- Party: Christian Social Union

Gerhard Hopp (born 13 February 1981 in Cham) is a German politician serving as a member of the Landtag of Bavaria since 2013. He has served as chairman of the Christian Social Union in Cham since 2022.
