= Fritz Zängl =

German skier

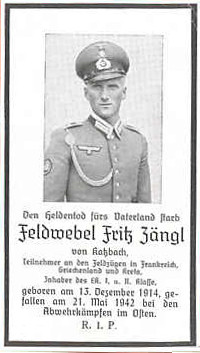

Personal information
- Born: 13 December 1914 Katzbach, German Empire
- Died: 21 May 1942 (aged 27) near Smerdyna, German-occupied Poland

Sport
- Sport: Skiing
- Club: ASV Cham

Fritz Zängl (13 December 1914 – 21 May 1942) was a German skier and soldier, reaching the rank of a Feldwebel.

== Biography ==
Zängl was born in Katzbach, today a borough of Cham. He was a member of the skiing club ASV Cham and served in the Gebirgsjäger-Regiment 100 in Bad Reichenhall. In the rank of an Oberjäger he participated in the German military patrol team at the FIS Nordic World Ski Championships 1939, which placed first and won the world master title.

In World War II he took part in the campaigns against France, Greece, Crete and at last against Russia, when he was killed in action near Smerdyna. He was awarded with the Eisernes Kreuz II and I.

In honor of his sports career the memorial race "Fritz-Zängl-Gedächtnislauf" is carried out by the ASV Cham since a couple of years.
