= Lenartowice =

Lenartowice may refer to the following places in Poland:

- Lenartowice, Lower Silesian Voivodeship (south-west Poland)
- Lenartowice, Opole Voivodeship (south-west Poland)
- Lenartowice, Greater Poland Voivodeship (west-central Poland)
- Lenartowice, Świętokrzyskie Voivodeship (south-central Poland)
