= Jo Lindner =

German social media influencer

Johannes "Jo" Lindner
- Born: 14 January 1993
- Died: 30 June 2023 (aged 30); Bangkok, Thailand
- Burial place: Cham, Bavaria
- Occupations: Internet influencer, bodybuilder, model
- Years active: 2014–2023

Johannes "Jo" Lindner (14 January 1993 – 30 June 2023), also known as Joesthetics on social media, was a German bodybuilder and model. He became one of the most famous German fitness influencers as well as co-owner of the food supplement brand Huge Supplements. He reached over nine million followers on Instagram over the course of several years. He also had a brand partnership with the fitness clothing brand YoungLA and with Father Sons Clothing.

Lindner is best known for his striped pectoral muscles – dubbed "alien gains" by himself – which he could move in a wave-like manner or similar to a keyboard. On 30 June 2023, Lindner died of an aneurysm at his home in Bangkok at the age of 30.

== Bodybuilding ==
One of Lindner's earliest videos with his "alien gains" that went viral was attributed to a muscle disease called rippling muscle disease (RMD). He first had such a muscle cramp on the toilet and then slowly discovered how he could manually induce the effect. Lindner succeeded early-on by winning the German National Championship in 2014 and the European Championship only one year later (both in the category "Men's physique"). At the age of 24, Lindner was able to achieve an eighth place in the "Men's Physique" category at the 2017 Bavarian Championships. After an extended absence from competition, he returned in 2022 and narrowly missed the "IFBB Pro Card" as the class winner and overall runner-up in the "Thailand Pro Qualifier".

In February 2021, Lindner introduced his own workout regime in the form of a mobile app called "Alien Gains". However its most recent version dates back to April 20 of the same year. It received mixed reviews on Android and iOS, averaging at 3.3 stars with only 145 ratings on iOS. Subsequently, it was removed from the Apple App Store in August 2022.

== Personal life ==
In one of his last interviews, on the YouTube channel Bradley Martyn's Raw Talk, Lindner talked about his success in social media and how he got into bodybuilding: he used to have a small channel ("I was always kinda small") and worked full-time as a technical draftsman and, after further training, in a microchip factory before he was able to earn money with fitness ("before doing it for money I do it for living"). Previously, Lindner had wanted to make a career in the bicycle sport "dirt jump", but had to give this up due to injury. Little is known about his parents and his other private life: he lived for a time in Dubai before returning to Thailand to live with his girlfriend Nicha.

Lindner suffered from Rippling muscle disease (RMD), a rare autosomal dominant disorder. There is no official treatment.

== Death ==
Shortly after his partner's publication, bodybuilder Noel Deyzel confirmed Lindner's death on Instagram in a post, after which Lindner's girlfriend Nicha also posted a series of pictures on Instagram, citing aneurysm as his cause of death. According to his girlfriend's statements, Lindner felt a pain in his neck for several days, but they did not realize it could lead to life-threatening conditions.

Lindner was cremated in Thailand and some of the ashes were buried in the family grave in his native Cham.

Fans likened Lindner to Zyzz and as a constant source for inspiration on their own gym journey among an outpour of solidarity on his Instagram. Lindner was known for addressing his followers as brazza/brazzer ("brother") and posting views about life in general.
