= Jasień, Staszów County =

Jasień
- Village
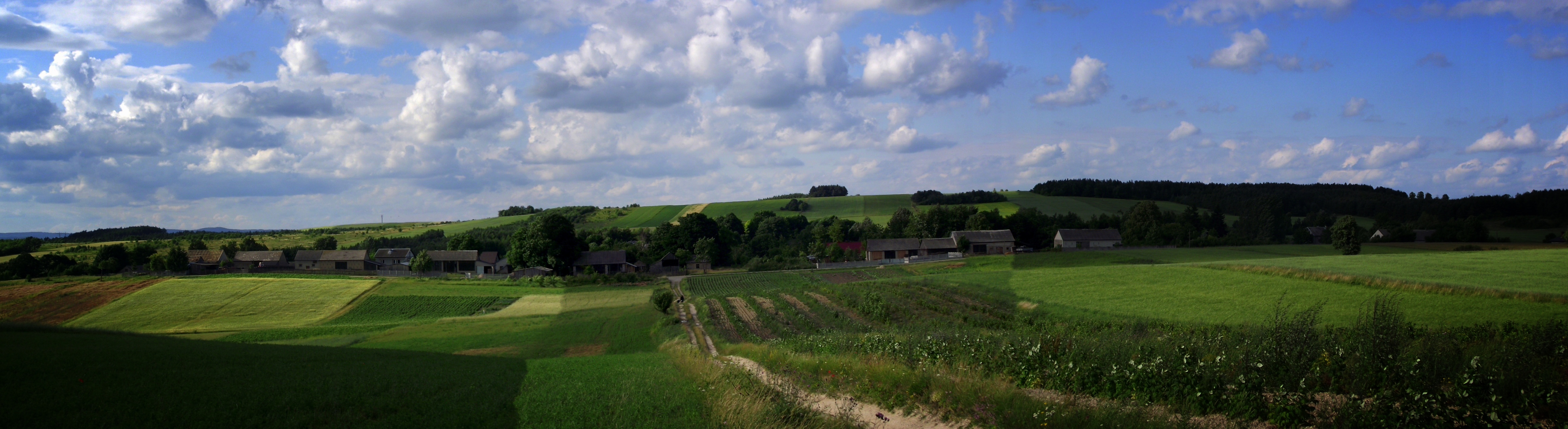
- General view of the village

- Location within Poland
- Coordinates: 50°37′22″N 21°04′52″E
- Country: Poland
- Voivodeship: Świętokrzyskie
- County: Staszów
- Gmina: Staszów
- Sołectwo: Jasień
- Elevation: 220.9 m (725 ft)

Population (31 December 2009 at Census)
  - Total: ▼154
- Time zone: UTC+1 (CET)
  - Summer (DST): UTC+2 (CEST)
- Postal code: 28-200
- Area code: +48 15
- Car plates: TSZ

Jasień [ˈjaɕɛɲ] is a village in the administrative district of Gmina Staszów, within Staszów County, Świętokrzyskie Voivodeship, in south-central Poland. It lies approximately 10 km (6 mi) north-west of Staszów and 44 km (27 mi) south-east of the regional capital Kielce.
