= Wola Wiśniowska =

- Village
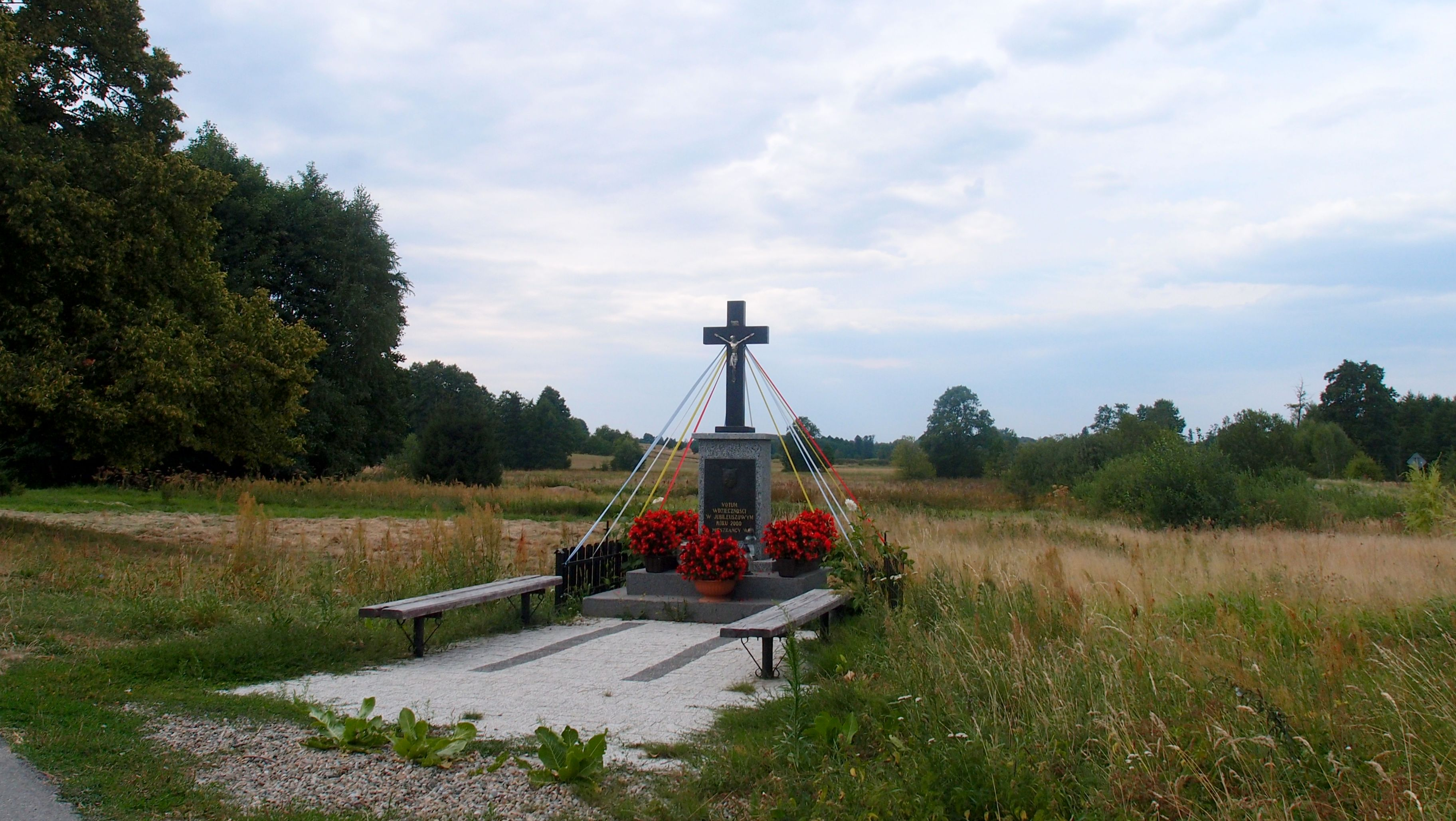

- Location within Poland
- Coordinates: 50°34′41″N 21°16′35″E
- Country: Poland
- Voivodeship: Świętokrzyskie
- County: Staszów
- Gmina: Staszów
- Sołectwo: Wola Wiśniowska
- Elevation: 197.4 m (648 ft)

Population (31 December 2009 at Census)
  - Total: ▲401
- Time zone: UTC+1 (CET)
  - Summer (DST): UTC+2 (CEST)
- Postal code: 28-200
- Area code: +48 15
- Car plates: TSZ

Wola Wiśniowska [ˈvɔla viɕˈɲɔfska] is a village in the administrative district of Gmina Staszów, within Staszów County, Świętokrzyskie Voivodeship, in south-central Poland. It lies approximately 8 km (5 mi) east of Staszów and 58 km (36 mi) south-east of the regional capital Kielce.
