= Wola Osowa =

- Village
- Location within Poland
- Coordinates: 50°37′11″N 21°06′29″E
- Country: Poland
- Voivodeship: Świętokrzyskie
- County: Staszów
- Gmina: Staszów
- Sołectwo: Wola Osowa
- Elevation: 243.7 m (800 ft)

Population (31 December 2009 at Census)
  - Total: ▲289
- Time zone: UTC+1 (CET)
  - Summer (DST): UTC+2 (CEST)
- Postal code: 28-200
- Area code: +48 15
- Car plates: TSZ

Wola Osowa [ˈvɔla ɔˈsɔva] is a village in the administrative district of Gmina Staszów, within Staszów County, Świętokrzyskie Voivodeship, in south-central Poland. It lies approximately 8 km (5 mi) north-west of Staszów and 46 km (29 mi) south-east of the regional capital Kielce.
