= The Flight from Woman =

1965 book by Karl Stern

- First edition
- Author: Karl Stern
- Language: English
- Subject: Philosophy / Spirituality
- Publisher: Farrar, Straus and Giroux
- Publication date: 1965
- Publication place: United States
- Pages: 310

The Flight from Woman is a book by psychiatrist Karl Stern, first published in 1965 by Farrar, Straus and Giroux. It is described as a study of the polarity of the sexes as reflected in the conflict between two modes of knowledge—scientific or rational, as contrasted with intuitive or poetic. In the course of exploring this theme Stern undertakes to provide psychological portraits of six representative figures whose thought and work have influenced modern man: Descartes, Goethe, Schopenhauer, Kierkegaard, Tolstoy, and Sartre.

Reviews

Man, Woman, and Person: Karl Stern, The Flight from Woman, Z. John Levay, M. D. Modern Age Volume 11, Number 1, page 83
