= Cham (electoral district) =

Former federal electoral district of Germany (1949–1965)

- Former electoral district for the Bundestag
- State list: Bavaria
- State: Bavaria
- Major settlements: Cham

Former electoral district
- Created: 1949
- Abolished: 1965

Cham was an electoral constituency (German: Wahlkreis) in Bavaria represented in the Bundestag from 1949 to 1965. It elected one member via first-past-the-post voting. It was located in eastern Bavaria, comprising the districts of Cham, Nabburg, Neunburg vorm Wald, Oberviechtach, Vohenstrauß and Waldmünchen.

In the 1965 West German federal election, the Upper Palatinate lost a constituency. The territory of the dissolved Cham constituency was incorporated into the Burglengenfeld constituency. This constituency was consistently won by CSU candidates, most recently by Alois Niederalt.

== Members ==
Election	Name	Party	First vote
1961	Alois Niederalt	CSU	74.2%
1957	Alois Niederalt	CSU	73.4%
1953	Alois Niederalt	CSU	61.1%
1949	Christof Nickl	CSU	36.3%

== Constituency history ==
Years	Constituency name	Area
1949–1953	21 Cham	Cham, Nabburg, Neunburg vorm Wald, Oberviechtach, Vohenstrauß and Waldmünchen
1953–1961	216 Cham	Cham, Nabburg, Neunburg vorm Wald, Oberviechtach, Vohenstrauß and Waldmünchen
