= Wólka Żabna =

- Village
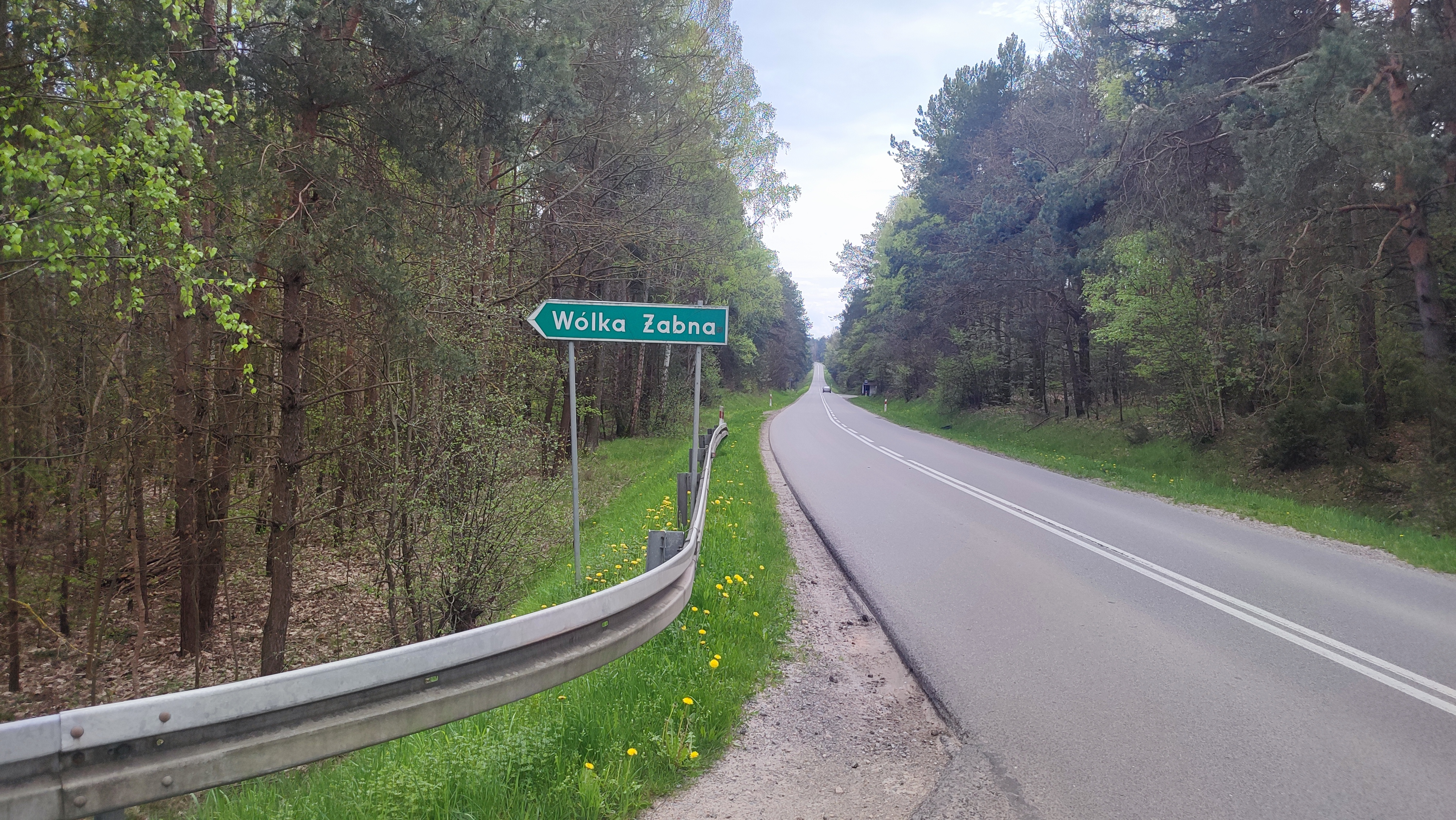

- Location within Poland
- Coordinates: 50°35′37″N 21°08′44″E
- Country: Poland
- Voivodeship: Świętokrzyskie
- County: Staszów
- Gmina: Staszów
- Sołectwo: Wólka Żabna
- Elevation: 204.5 m (671 ft)

Population (31 December 2009 at Census)
  - Total: ▲130
- Time zone: UTC+1 (CET)
  - Summer (DST): UTC+2 (CEST)
- Postal code: 28-200
- Area code: +48 15
- Car plates: TSZ

Wólka Żabna [ˈvulka ˈʐabna] is a village in the administrative district of Gmina Staszów, within Staszów County, Świętokrzyskie Voivodeship, in south-central Poland. It lies approximately 5 km (3 mi) north-west of Staszów and 50 km (31 mi) south-east of the regional capital Kielce.
