= Wiązownica Duża =

- Village
- Location within Poland
- Coordinates: 50°34′06″N 21°21′09″E
- Country: Poland
- Voivodeship: Świętokrzyskie
- County: Staszów
- Gmina: Staszów
- Sołectwo: Wiązownica Duża
- Elevation: 185.2 m (608 ft)

Population (31 December 2009 at Census)
  - Total: 706
- Time zone: UTC+1 (CET)
  - Summer (DST): UTC+2 (CEST)
- Postal code: 28-200
- Area code: +48 15
- Car plates: TSZ

Wiązownica Duża [vjɔ̃zɔvˈnit͡sa ˈduʐa] is a village in the administrative district of Gmina Staszów, within Staszów County, Świętokrzyskie Voivodeship, in south-central Poland. It lies approximately 14 km (9 mi) east of Staszów and 63 km (39 mi) south-east of the regional capital Kielce.
