= Gaj Koniemłocki =

- Village
- Location within Poland
- Coordinates: 50°31′33″N 21°08′08″E
- Country: Poland
- Voivodeship: Świętokrzyskie
- County: Staszów
- Gmina: Staszów
- Sołectwo: Gaj Koniemłocki
- Elevation: 199.2 m (654 ft)
  - Total: ▼87
- Time zone: UTC+1 (CET)
  - Summer (DST): UTC+2 (CEST)
- Postal code: 28–200
- Area code: +48 15
- Car plates: TSZ

Gaj Koniemłocki (Polish pronunciation: [ˈɡaj kɔɲɛmˈwɔtskʲi]) is a village in the administrative district of Gmina Staszów, within Staszów County, Świętokrzyskie Voivodeship, in south-central Poland. It lies approximately 5 km (3 mi) south-west of Staszów and 55 km (34 mi) south-east of the regional capital Kielce.
