= Wiązownica Mała =

- Village
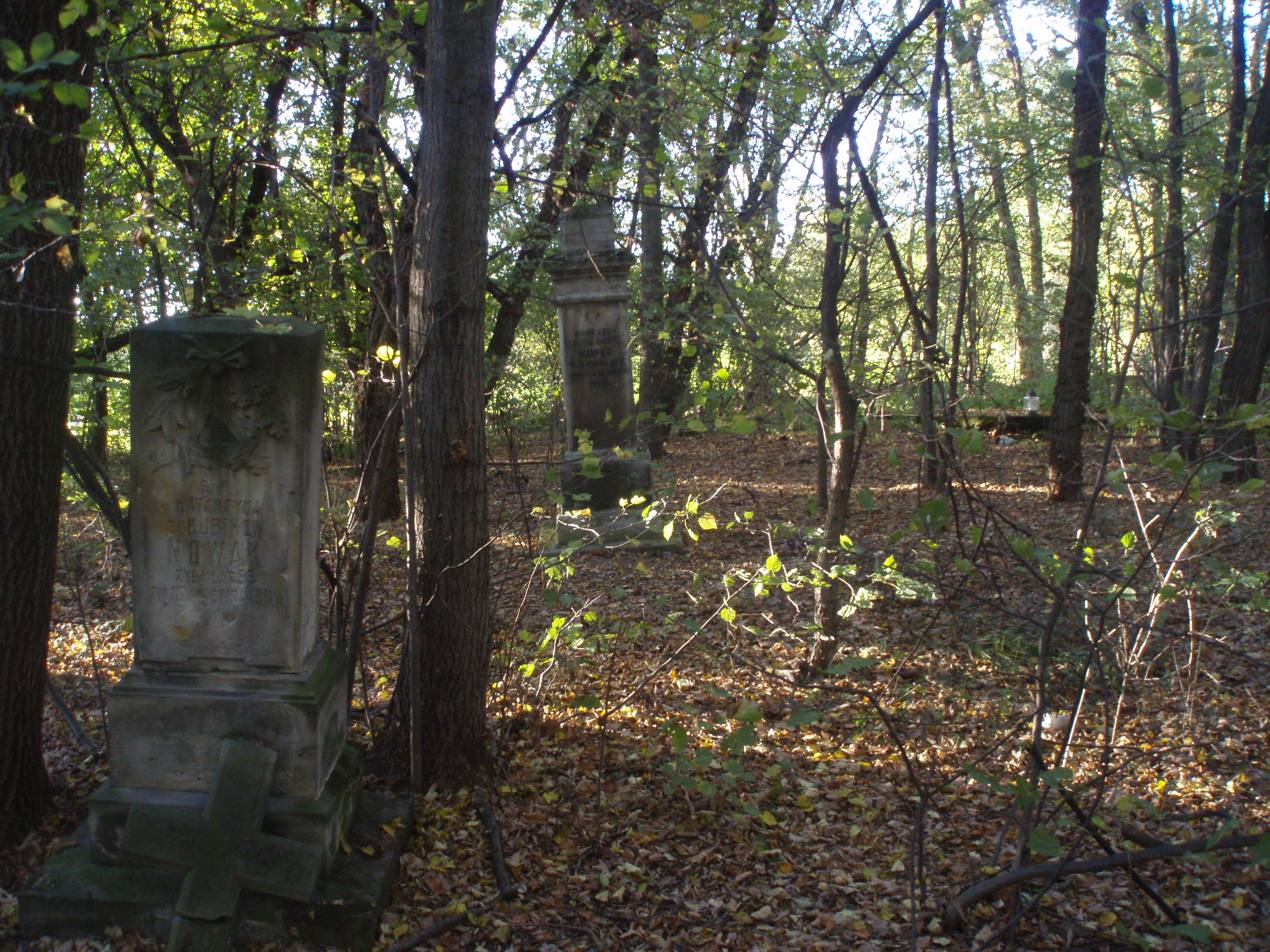
- Former cemetery

- Location within Poland
- Coordinates: 50°34′32″N 21°21′39″E
- Country: Poland
- Voivodeship: Świętokrzyskie
- County: Staszów
- Gmina: Staszów
- Sołectwo: Wiązownica Mała
- Elevation: 184 m (604 ft)

Population (31 December 2009 at Census)
  - Total: ▼205
- Time zone: UTC+1 (CET)
  - Summer (DST): UTC+2 (CEST)
- Postal code: 28-200
- Area code: +48 15
- Car plates: TSZ

Wiązownica Mała [vjɔ̃zɔvˈnit͡sa ˈmawa] is a village in the administrative district of Gmina Staszów, within Staszów County, Świętokrzyskie Voivodeship, in south-central Poland. It lies approximately 15 km (9 mi) east of Staszów and 63 km (39 mi) south-east of the regional capital Kielce.
