= Oględów =

Village in Świętokrzyskie Voivodeship, Poland

- Village
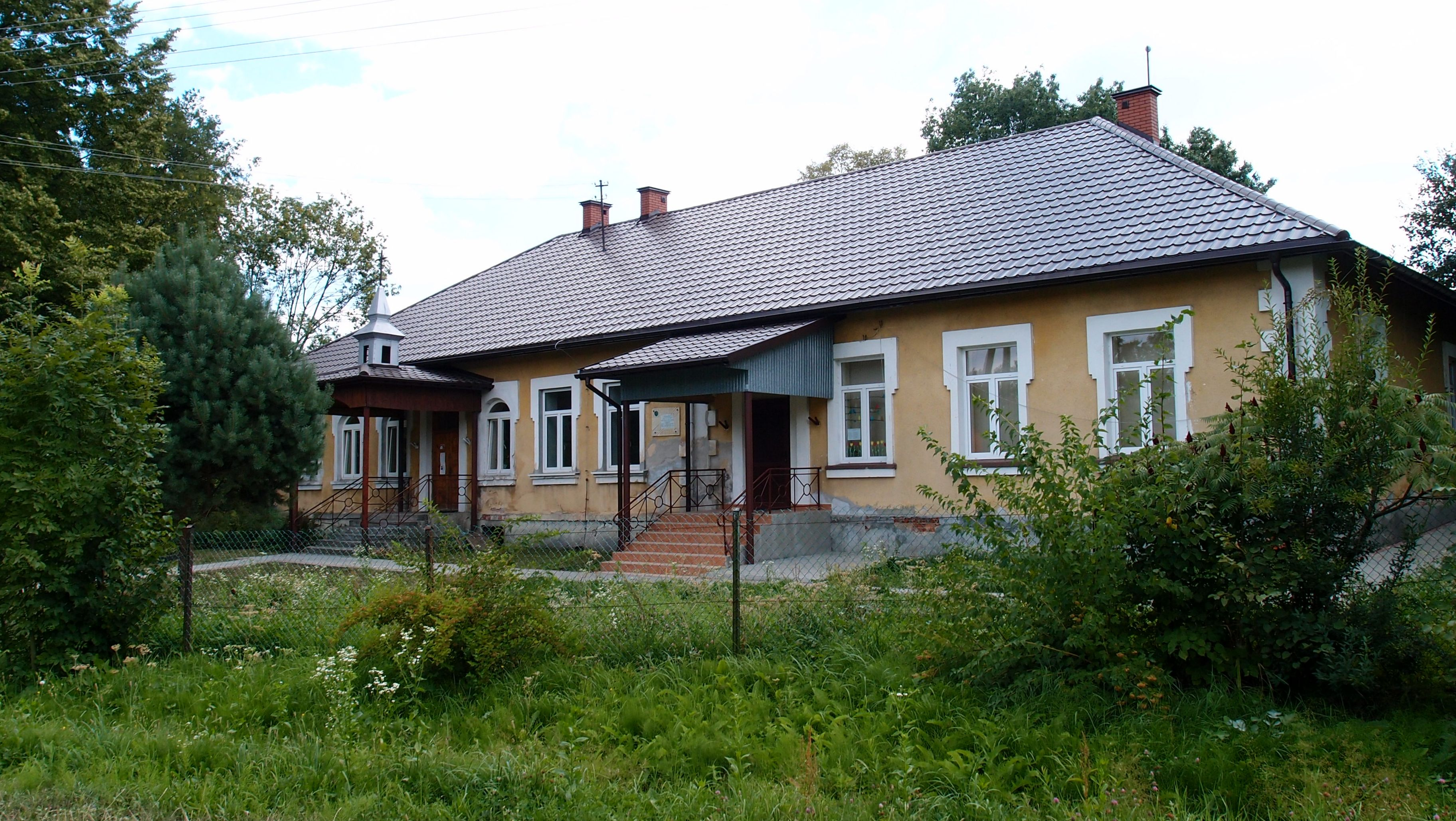

- Location within Poland
- Coordinates: 50°33′51″N 21°07′13″E
- Country: Poland
- Voivodeship: Świętokrzyskie
- County: Staszów
- Gmina: Staszów
- Sołectwo: Oględów
- Elevation: 231.3 m (759 ft)

Population (31 December 2009 at Census)
  - Total: ▲435
- Time zone: UTC+1 (CET)
  - Summer (DST): UTC+2 (CEST)
- Postal code: 28-200
- Area code: +48 15
- Car plates: TSZ

Oględów [ɔˈɡlɛnduf] is a village in the administrative district of Gmina Staszów, within Staszów County, Świętokrzyskie Voivodeship, in south-central Poland. It lies approximately 4 km (2 mi) west of Staszów and 51 km (32 mi) south-east of the regional capital Kielce.
