= Podmaleniec =

- Village
- Location within Poland
- Coordinates: 50°35′56″N 21°11′31″E
- Country: Poland
- Voivodeship: Świętokrzyskie
- County: Staszów
- Gmina: Staszów
- Sołectwo: Podmaleniec
- Elevation: 214.6 m (704 ft)

Population (31 December 2009 at Census)
  - Total: ▲521
- Time zone: UTC+1 (CET)
  - Summer (DST): UTC+2 (CEST)
- Postal code: 28-200
- Area code: +48 15
- Car plates: TSZ

Podmaleniec [pɔdmaˈlɛɲɛt͡s] is a village in the administrative district of Gmina Staszów, within Staszów County, Świętokrzyskie Voivodeship, in south-central Poland. It lies approximately 5 km (3 mi) north of Staszów and 52 km (32 mi) south-east of the regional capital Kielce.
