= Czajków Północny =

- Village
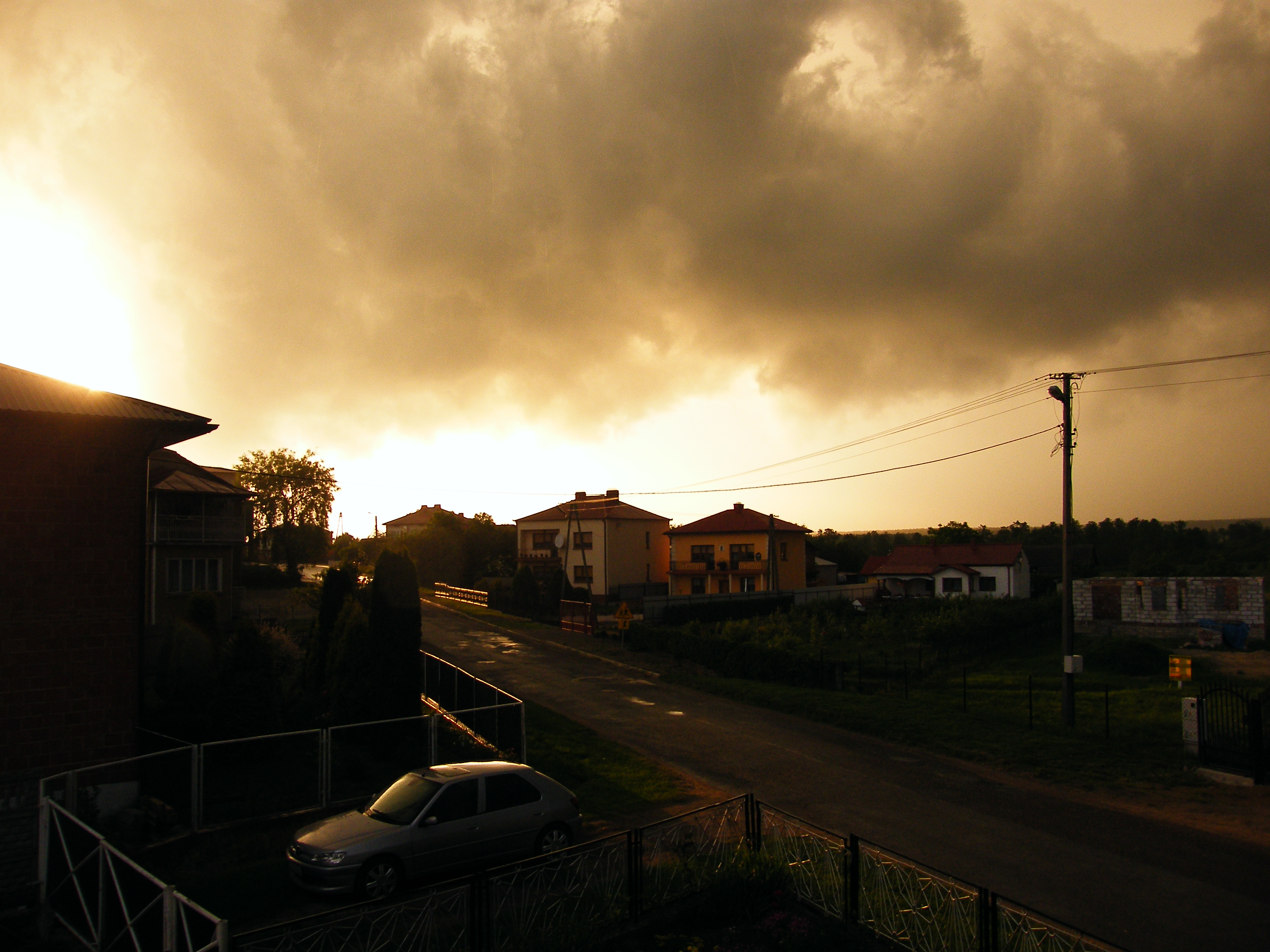

- Location within Poland
- Coordinates: 50°34′31″N 21°18′05″E
- Country: Poland
- Voivodeship: Świętokrzyskie
- County: Staszów
- Gmina: Staszów
- Sołectwo: Czajków Północny
- Elevation: 191.1 m (627 ft)

Population (31 December 2009 at Census)
  - Total: ▲588
- Time zone: UTC+1 (CET)
  - Summer (DST): UTC+2 (CEST)
- Postal code: 28-200
- Area code: +48 15
- Car plates: TSZ

Czajków Północny [ˈt͡ʂai̯kuf puu̯ˈnɔt͡snɨ] is a village in the administrative district of Gmina Staszów, within Staszów County, Świętokrzyskie Voivodeship, in south-central Poland. It lies approximately 9 km (6 mi) east of Staszów and 59 km (37 mi) south-east of the regional capital Kielce.
