= Sielec, Staszów County =

Sielec
- Village
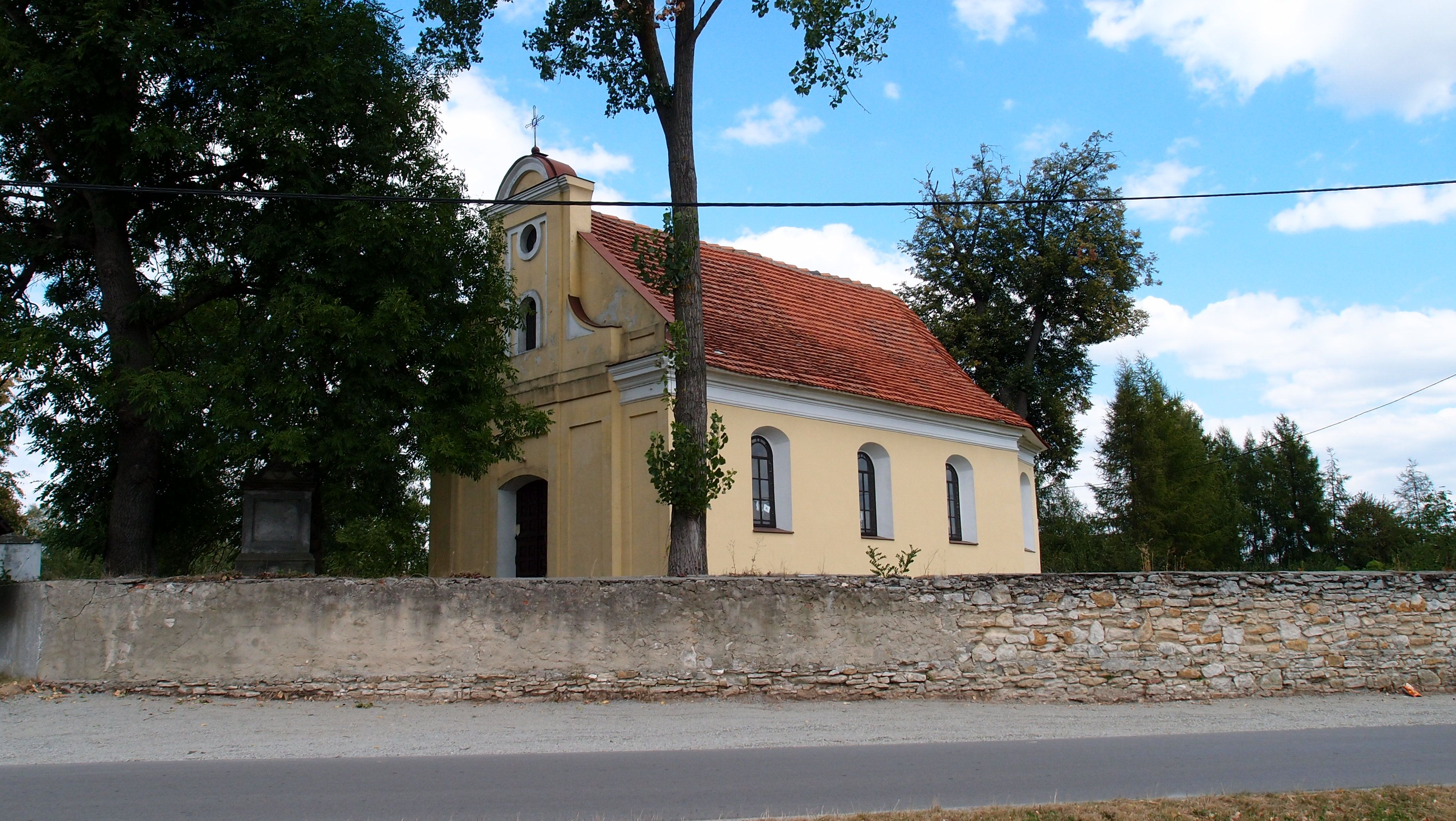
- Former Protestant church

- Location within Poland
- Coordinates: 50°32′42″N 21°07′19″E
- Country: Poland
- Voivodeship: Świętokrzyskie
- County: Staszów
- Gmina: Staszów
- Sołectwo: Sielec
- Elevation: 202.1 m (663 ft)

Population (31 December 2009 at Census)
  - Total: ▲415
- Time zone: UTC+1 (CET)
  - Summer (DST): UTC+2 (CEST)
- Postal code: 28-200
- Area code: +48 15
- Car plates: TSZ

Sielec [ˈɕɛlɛt͡s] is a village in the administrative district of Gmina Staszów, within Staszów County, Świętokrzyskie Voivodeship, in south-central Poland. It lies approximately 4 km (2 mi) south-west of Staszów and 52 km (32 mi) south-east of the regional capital Kielce.
