= Gmina Staszów =

Gmina Staszów Staszów Commune
- Gmina
- Coat of arms

- Coordinates (Staszów): 50°34′11.08″N 21°13′39.06″E
- Country: Poland
- Voivodeship: Świętokrzyskie
- County: Staszów
- Seat: Staszów

Area (through the years 2008–2010)
  - Total: 227.52 km^{2} (87.85 sq mi)

Population (31 December 2010 at Census)
  - Total: 26,077
  - Density: 114.61/km^{2} (296.85/sq mi)
  - Urban: 15,108
  - Rural: 10,969
- Time zone: UTC+1 (CET)
  - Summer (DST): UTC+2 (CEST)
- Postal code: 28–200
- Area code: +48 15
- Car plates: TSZ
- Website: http://www.staszow.pl

Gmina Staszów is an urban-rural gmina (administrative district) in Staszów County, Świętokrzyskie Voivodeship, in south-central Poland. Its seat is the town of Staszów, which lies approximately 53 kilometres (33 mi) south-east of the regional capital Kielce.

The gmina covers an area of 227.52 square kilometres (87.8 sq mi), and as of 2010 its total population is ▼26,077 (out of which the population of Staszów amounts to ▼15,108, and the population of the rural part of the gmina is ▲10,969).

== Demography ==
According to the 2011 Poland census, there were 26,077 people residing in Staszów Commune, of whom 48.8% were male and 51.2% were female (out of which the population in rural areas amounts to 10,969, of whom 49.6% were male and 50.4% were female). In the commune, the population was spread out, with 19.4% under the age of 18, 38.3% from 18 to 44, 25.1% from 45 to 64, and 17.1% who were 65 years of age or older (out of which the population in rural areas amounts to 20% under the age of 18, 38.5% from 18 to 44, 22.8% from 45 to 64, and 18.6% who were 65 years of age or older).

Table 1. Population level of commune in 2010 – by age group
SPECIFICATION					Measure unit	POPULATION (by age group in 2010)																		
SPECIFICATION					Measure unit	TOTAL	0–4	5–9	10–14	15–19	20–24	25–29	30–34	35–39	40–44	45–49	50–54	55–59	60–64	65–69	70–74	75–79	80–84	85 +
I.	TOTAL				person	26,077	1,303	1,223	1,489	1,826	1,924	2,063	1,876	1,727	1,624	1,574	2,020	2,070	1,848	983	876	678	538	435
I.	—	of which in			%	100	5	4.7	5.7	7	7.4	7.9	7.2	6.6	6.2	6	7.7	7.9	7.1	3.8	3.4	2.6	2.1	1.7
I.	1.	BY SEX																						
I.	1.	A.	Males		person	12,735	664	610	772	900	979	1,097	1,016	868	819	784	981	986	886	453	358	267	189	106
I.	1.	A.	—	of which in	%	48.8	2.5	2.3	3	3.5	3.8	4.2	3.9	3.3	3.1	3	3.8	3.8	3.4	1.7	1.4	1	0.7	0.4
I.	1.	B.	Females		person	13,342	639	613	717	926	945	966	860	859	805	790	1,039	1,084	962	530	518	411	349	329
I.	1.	B.	—	of which in	%	51.2	2.5	2.4	2.7	3.6	3.6	3.7	3.3	3.3	3.1	3	4	4.2	3.7	2	2	1.6	1.3	1.3

Table 2. Population level in rural areas in 2010 – by age group
SPECIFICATION					Measure unit	POPULATION (by age group in 2010)																		
SPECIFICATION					Measure unit	TOTAL	0–4	5–9	10–14	15–19	20–24	25–29	30–34	35–39	40–44	45–49	50–54	55–59	60–64	65–69	70–74	75–79	80–84	85 +
I.	TOTAL				person	10,969	572	526	635	787	873	882	746	751	647	620	764	761	680	364	377	348	356	280
I.	—	of which in			%	100	5.2	4.8	5.8	7.2	8	8	6.8	6.8	5.9	5.7	7	6.9	6.2	3.3	3.4	3.2	3.2	2.6
I.	1.	BY SEX																						
I.	1.	A.	Males		person	5,441	291	264	323	370	458	451	411	380	347	327	408	392	361	187	154	128	116	73
I.	1.	A.	—	of which in	%	49.6	2.7	2.4	2.9	3.4	4.2	4.1	3.7	3.5	3.2	3	3.7	3.6	3.3	1.7	1.4	1.2	1.1	0.7
I.	1.	B.	Females		person	5,528	281	262	312	417	415	431	335	371	300	293	356	369	319	177	223	220	240	207
I.	1.	B.	—	of which in	%	50.4	2.6	2.4	2.8	3.8	3.8	3.9	3.1	3.4	2.7	2.7	3.2	3.4	2.9	1.6	2	2	2.2	1.9

Figure 1. Population pyramid of commune in 2010 – by age group and sex
Figure 2. Population pyramid in rural areas in 2010 – by age group and sex

Table 3. Population level of commune in 2010 – by sex
SPECIFICATION						Measure unit	POPULATION (by sex in 2010)		
SPECIFICATION						Measure unit	TOTAL	Males	Females
I.	TOTAL					person	26,077	12,735	13,342
I.	—	of which in				%	100	48.8	51.2
I.	1.	BY AGE GROUP							
I.	1.	A.	At pre-working age			person	5,066	2,598	2,468
I.	1.	A.	—	of which in		%	19.4	10.0	9.5
I.	1.	B.	At working age. grand total			person	16,539	8,764	7,775
I.	1.	B.	—	of which in		%	63.4	33.6	29.8
I.	1.	B.	a.	at mobile working age		person	9,989	5,127	4,862
I.	1.	B.	a.	—	of which in | %	38.3	19.7	18.6	
I.	1.	B.	b.	at non-mobile working age		person	6,550	3,637	2,913
I.	1.	B.	b.	—	of which in | %	25.1	13.9	11.2	
I.	1.	C.	At post-working age			person	4,472	1,373	3,099
I.	1.	C.	—	of which in		%	17.1	5.3	11.9

Table 4. Population level in rural areas in 2010 – by sex
SPECIFICATION						Measure unit	POPULATION (by sex in 2010)		
SPECIFICATION						Measure unit	TOTAL	Males	Females
I.	TOTAL					person	10,969	5,441	5,528
I.	—	of which in				%	100	49.6	50.4
I.	1.	BY AGE GROUP							
I.	1.	A.	At pre-working age			person	2,198	1,108	1,090
I.	1.	A.	—	of which in		%	20	10.1	9.9
I.	1.	B.	At working age. grand total			person	6,727	3,675	3,052
I.	1.	B.	—	of which in		%	61.3	33.5	27.8
I.	1.	B.	a.	at mobile working age		person	4,221	2,187	2,034
I.	1.	B.	a.	—	of which in | %	38.5	19.9	18.5	
I.	1.	B.	b.	at non-mobile working age		person	2,506	1,488	1,018
I.	1.	B.	b.	—	of which in | %	22.8	13.6	9.3	
I.	1.	C.	At post-working age			person	2,044	658	1,386
I.	1.	C.	—	of which in		%	18.6	6	12.6

== Villages ==
Apart from the town of Staszów, Gmina Staszów contains the villages and settlements of Czajków Północny, Czajków Południowy, Czernica, Dobra, Gaj Koniemłocki, Grzybów, Jasień, Koniemłoty, Kopanina, Krzczonowice, Krzywołęcz, Kurozwęki, Łaziska, Lenartowice, Łukawica, Mostki, Niemścice, Oględów, Poddębowiec, Podmaleniec, Ponik, Sielec, Smerdyna, Stefanówek, Sztombergi, Wiązownica Duża, Wiązownica Mała, Wiązownica-Kolonia, Wiśniowa, Wiśniowa Poduchowna, Wola Osowa, Wola Wiśniowska, Wólka Żabna, Zagrody and Ziemblice.

== Neighbouring gminas ==
Gmina Staszów is bordered by the gminas of Bogoria, Klimontów, Osiek, Raków, Rytwiany, Szydłów and Tuczępy.
