= Wiśniowa Poduchowna =

- Village
- Location within Poland
- Coordinates: 50°36′13″N 21°13′46″E
- Country: Poland
- Voivodeship: Świętokrzyskie
- County: Staszów
- Gmina: Staszów
- Sołectwo: Wiśniowa Poduchowna
- Elevation: 223.3 m (733 ft)

Population (31 December 2009 at Census)
  - Total: ▲326
- Time zone: UTC+1 (CET)
  - Summer (DST): UTC+2 (CEST)
- Postal code: 28-200
- Area code: +48 15
- Car plates: TSZ

Wiśniowa Poduchowna [viɕˈɲɔva pɔduˈxɔvna] is a village in the administrative district of Gmina Staszów, within Staszów County, Świętokrzyskie Voivodeship, in south-central Poland. It lies approximately 7 km (4 mi) north-east of Staszów and 54 km (34 mi) south-east of the regional capital Kielce.
