= Niemścice =

- Village
- Location within Poland
- Coordinates: 50°34′28″N 21°06′27″E
- Country: Poland
- Voivodeship: Świętokrzyskie
- County: Staszów
- Gmina: Staszów
- Sołectwo: Niemścice
- Elevation: 230.6 m (757 ft)

Population (31 December 2009 at Census)
  - Total: 232
- Time zone: UTC+1 (CET)
  - Summer (DST): UTC+2 (CEST)
- Postal code: 28-200
- Area code: +48 15
- Car plates: TSZ

Niemścice [ɲɛmɕˈt͡ɕit͡sɛ] is a village in the administrative district of Gmina Staszów, within Staszów County, Świętokrzyskie Voivodeship, in south-central Poland. It lies approximately 5 km (3 mi) west of Staszów and 49 km (30 mi) south-east of the regional capital Kielce.
