= Poddębowiec =

- Village
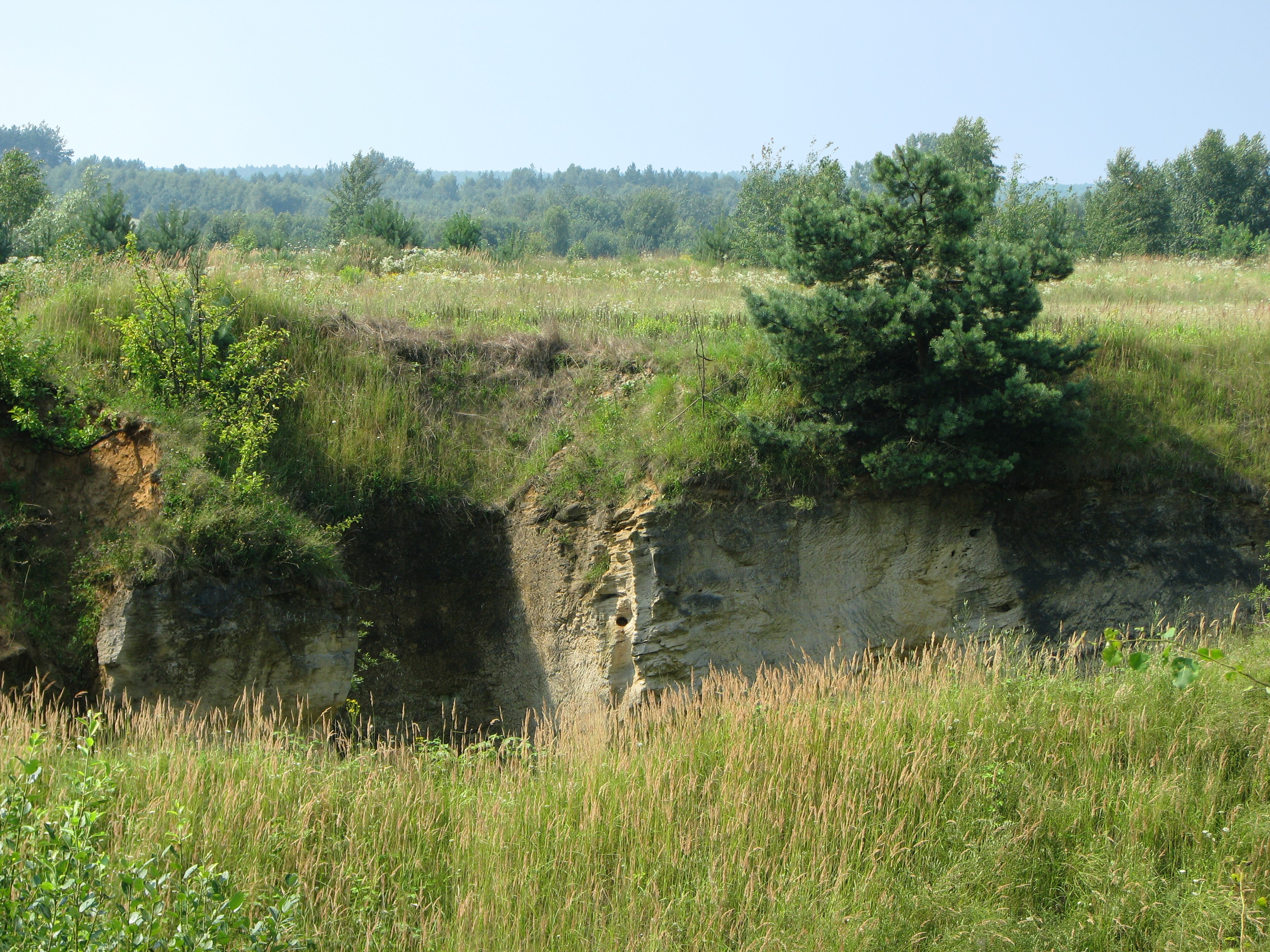
- Quarry

- Location within Poland
- Coordinates: 50°36′59″N 21°10′46″E
- Country: Poland
- Voivodeship: Świętokrzyskie
- County: Staszów
- Gmina: Staszów
- Sołectwo: Poddębowiec
- Elevation: 239 m (784 ft)

Population (31 December 2009 at Census)
  - Total: ▲137
- Time zone: UTC+1 (CET)
  - Summer (DST): UTC+2 (CEST)
- Postal code: 28-200
- Area code: +48 15
- Car plates: TSZ

Poddębowiec [pɔddɛmˈbɔvjɛt͡s] is a village in the administrative district of Gmina Staszów, within Staszów County, Świętokrzyskie Voivodeship, in south-central Poland. It lies approximately 6 km (4 mi) north of Staszów and 50 km (31 mi) south-east of the regional capital Kielce.
