= Karl Stern =

German-Canadian neurologist and psychiatrist (1906–1975)

- Stern, 1950s
- Born: 8 April 1906; Cham, Germany
- Died: 7 November 1975 (aged 69); Montréal, Quebec, Canada
- Occupations: Neurologist, psychiatrist
- Spouse(s): Liselotte von Baeyer, (granddaughter of Adolf von Baeyer)
- Children: Antony, Katherine, Michael, John
- Writing career
- Period: 20th century
- Genres: Autobiography, devotional
- Subjects: Psychiatry, religion
- Notable works: Pillar of Fire (1951), "The Flight from Woman"

Karl Stern (April 8, 1906 - November 11, 1975) was a German Canadian neurologist and psychiatrist, and a Jewish convert to the Catholic Church. Stern is best known for the account of his conversion in Pillar of Fire (1951).

== Life and career ==
Stern was born in the small town Cham in Bavaria in 1906, to socially assimilated Jewish parents. There was no synagogue or rabbi in the town, and although regular services and classes were held under the direction of a cantor, Stern's religious education was minimal. As a teenager he sought to re-engage with the Jewish faith, and began attending an Orthodox synagogue, but he soon became an atheist Zionist.

He studied medicine at the Ludwig-Maximilians-Universität München, the Friedrich Wilhelm University of Berlin, and the University of Frankfurt am Main, and came to specialize in psychiatric research. In the course of undergoing psychoanalysis himself, he regained belief in God and returned to Orthodox Jewish worship. He emigrated from Nazi Germany in 1936, finding work in neurological research in England, and later as lecturer in neuropathology and assistant neuropathologist at the Montreal Neurological Institute, under Wilder Penfield. It was while in London that he began to take an interest in the Catholic faith.

In 1943, after much soul-searching, and ultimately influenced by encounters with Jacques Maritain and Dorothy Day, Stern converted to Christianity and was baptized as a Roman Catholic.

Stern married Liselotte von Baeyer, a bookbinder (died 1970) and they had four children: Antony, a psychiatrist (1937-1967), Katherine Skorzewska, Michael and John. Stern was significantly incapacitated by a stroke in 1970, although he continued working and died in Montreal in 1975.

== Writings ==
=== Books ===
- Pillar of Fire. New York: Harcourt, Brace, 1951.

Much reprinted, most recently by Urbi Et Orbi Communications, 2001. ISBN 1-884660-12-6.
French translation, Le buisson ardent. Paris: Seuil, 1951.
Dutch translation, De vuurzuil. Antwerp: Sheed and Ward, 1951.
German translation, Die Feuerwolke. Salzburg: Müller, 1954.

- The Third Revolution: A Study of Psychiatry and Religion. New York: Harcourt, Brace, 1954.

French translation, La troisième révolution: essai sur la psychanalyse et la religion. Paris: Du Seuil, 1955.
German translation, Die dritte Revolution: Psychiatrie und Religion. Salzburg: Otto Müller, 1956.
Dutch translation, De derde revolutie: psychiatrie en religie. Utrecht: De Fontein, 1958.

- Through Dooms of Love: a novel. New York: Farrar, Straus and Cudahy, 1960.
- The Flight from Woman. New York: Farrar, Straus and Giroux, 1965. :Reissued New York: Paragon House, 1985. ISBN 0-913757-51-9.

German translation, Die Flucht vor dem Weib: zur Pathologie des Zeitgeistes. Salzburg: Otto Müller, 1968.
French translation, Refus de la femme. Montréal: Éditions HMH, 1968.

- Love and Success, and other essays. New York: Farrar, Straus and Giroux, 1975. ISBN 0-374-19258-8.

=== Other writings ===
- Preface to Henri Gratton, Psychanalyses d'hier et d'aujourd'hui comme thérapeutiques, sciences et philosophies: introduction aux problèmes de la psychologie des profondeurs. Paris: Cerf, 1955.
- Essay on St Thérèse of Lisieux, in Saints for Now, edited by Clare Boothe Luce. London and New York: Sheed & Ward, 1952. Reprinted San Francisco: Ignatius Press, 1993. ISBN 0-89870-476-6.

== Works about Stern ==
- Daniel Burston, A Forgotten Freudian, The Passion of Karl Stern. London: Karnac, 2016.
- Bernard Heller, Epistle to an Apostate. New York: Bookman's Press, 1951.
- "Karl Stern", in F. Lelotte (ed.), Convertis du XXème siècle. Vol. 2. Paris and Tournai: Casterman; Brussels: Foyer Notre-Dame, 1954. Reprinted 1963.
- "Karl Stern", in International Biographical Dictionary of Central European Émigrés 1933-1945. Vol. 2, part 2. Edited by Werner Röder and Herbert A. Strauss. Munich: Saur, 1983.
- "Karl Stern", in Charles Patrick Connor, Classic Catholic Converts. San Francisco: Ignatius Press, 2001. ISBN 0-89870-787-0
- "Karl Stern", in Lorene Hanley Duquin, A Century of Catholic Converts. Our Sunday Visitor, 2003. ISBN 1-931709-01-7.
- Robert B. McFarland, "Elective Divinities: Exile and Religious Conversion in Alfred Döblin's 'Schicksalsreise' (Destiny's Journey), Karl Jakob Hirsch's 'Heimkehr zu Gott' (Return to God), and Karl Stern's 'The Pillar of Fire'". Christianity & Literature 57:1 (2007), pp. 35–61.
