= Wiśniowa, Staszów County =

Wiśniowa
- Village
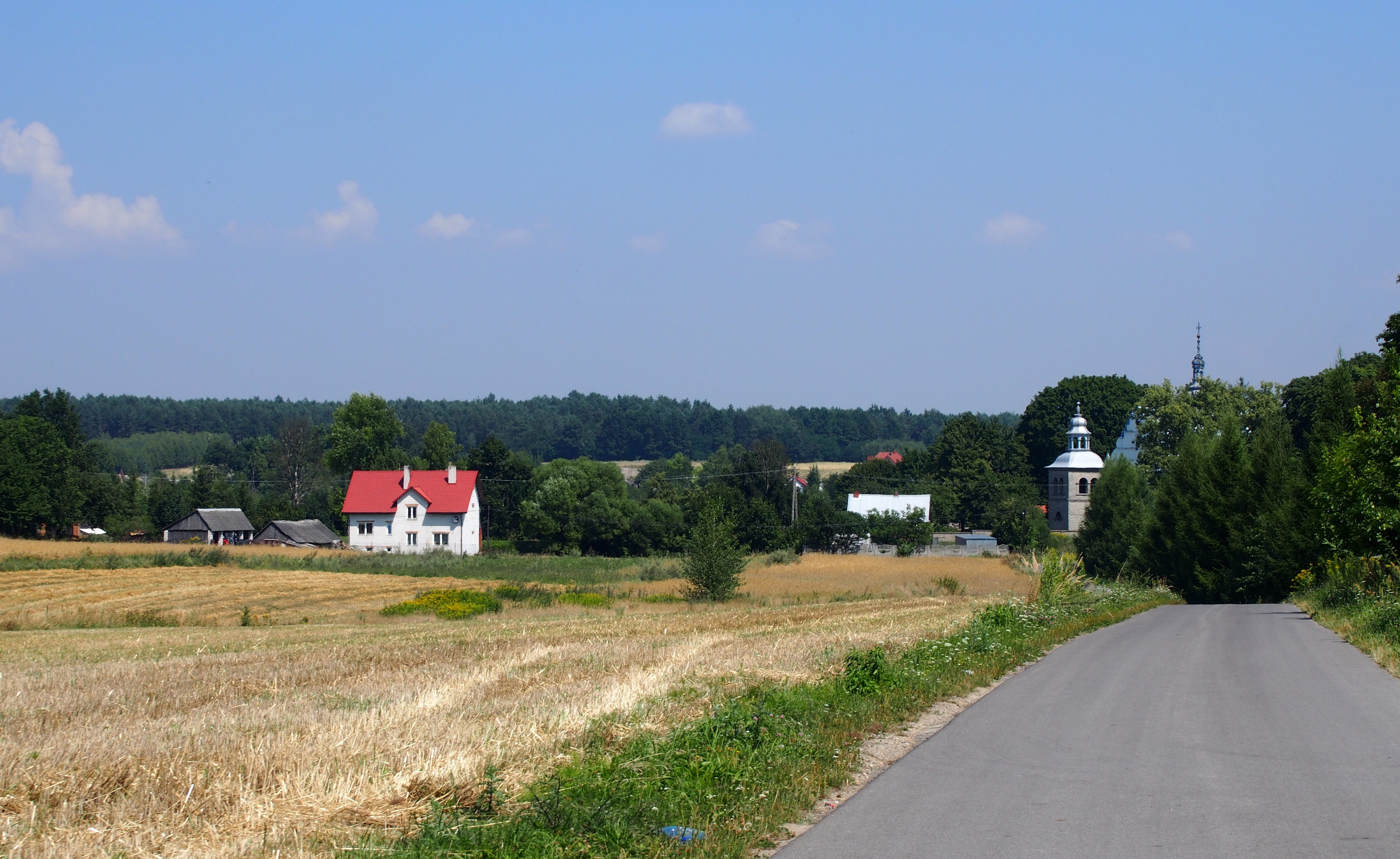

- Location within Poland
- Coordinates: 50°35′34″N 21°15′07″E
- Country: Poland
- Voivodeship: Świętokrzyskie
- County: Staszów
- Gmina: Staszów
- Sołectwo: Wiśniowa
- Elevation: 209.8 m (688 ft)

Population (31 December 2009 at Census)
  - Total: ▲627
- Time zone: UTC+1 (CET)
  - Summer (DST): UTC+2 (CEST)
- Postal code: 28-200
- Area code: +48 15
- Car plates: TSZ

Wiśniowa [viɕˈɲɔva] is a village in the administrative district of Gmina Staszów, within Staszów County, Świętokrzyskie Voivodeship, in south-central Poland. It lies approximately 8 km (5 mi) north-east of Staszów and 56 km (35 mi) south-east of the regional capital Kielce.

== See also ==
- The Lesser Polish Way
