= Wolfgang Gedeon =

German author and former politician

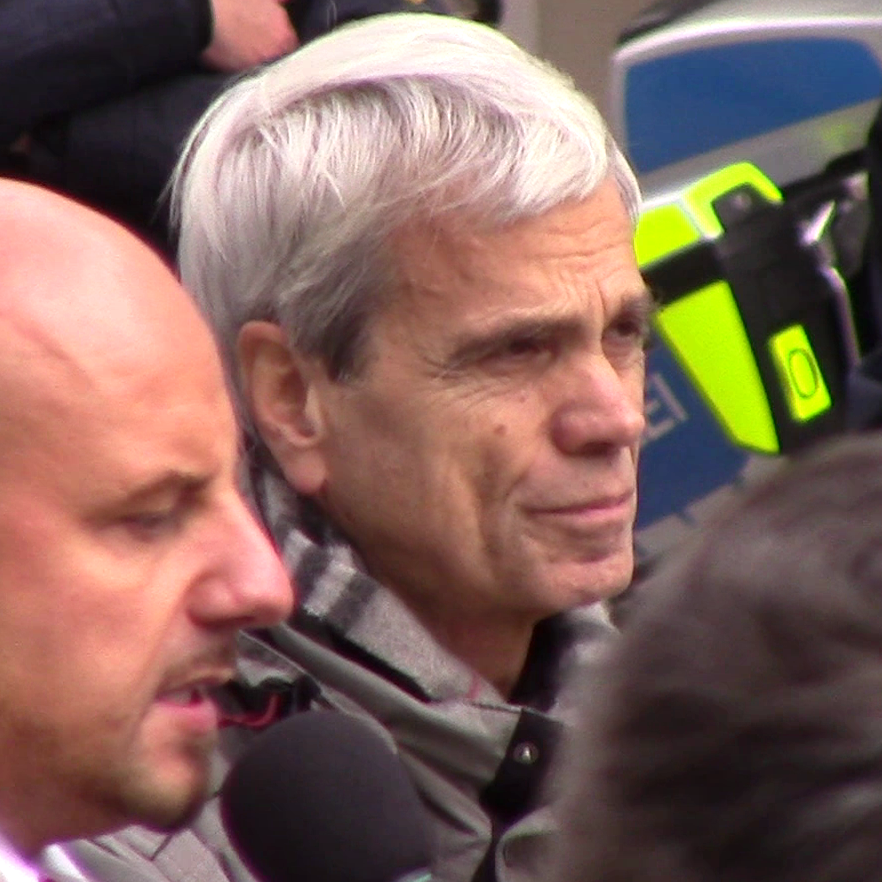
- Gedeon at a protest in 2018

Member of the Landtag of Baden-Württemberg for Singen
- In office 11 May 2016 – 11 May 2021
- Preceded by: Hans-Peter Storz
- Succeeded by: Bernhard Eisenhut
- Constituency: Second Mandate

Personal details
- Born: 23 April 1947 (age 79) Cham, Bavaria, West Germany
- Known for: Politician
- Website: wolfgang-gedeon.de

Wolfgang Michael Gedeon (born 1947) is a German far-right author and former politician of the Alternative for Germany (AfD).

In March 2016, the retired physician and author of several books was elected a deputy of the Baden-Württemberg state parliament. Soon thereafter, scholars and the media widely denounced his controversial books as antisemitic and trivializing the Holocaust. Fellow party members turned against him, the state party's vice chair calling him the "prototypical antisemitic conspiracy theorist", while others insisted on further investigations. In July 2016, the party's parliamentary caucus broke in two, though the AfD national leadership eventually forced him to temporarily stay off the party's caucus. Gedeon however kept his parliamentary mandate and remains a regular member and first speaker of the party's local chapter.

== Early life and education ==
Wolfgang Gedeon was born into a Roman Catholic milieu in Cham, Germany, where he attended the local gymnasium. Following his Abitur in 1966, he studied medicine at Würzburg University and, from 1969 on, at LMU Munich, where in 1972 he received his Staatsexamen. A year later he acquired his doctorate with a thesis in the field of gynaecology. Following a brief period as a trainee in a surgical department in Regensburg, he specialized as a general practitioner, opening his own medical practice in Gelsenkirchen.

== 1970s and 1980s ==
In the early 1970s, ahead of the Sino-Albanian split, Gedeon became involved with the anti-revisionist Communist Party of Germany/Marxists–Leninists (Central Committee) (KPD/ML-ZK). Gedeon was involved in the 1971 protests against fare increases in public transport, nationally known as the Rote-Punkt-Aktion. A leading cadre of the party's local organization in Gelsenkirchen, he was particularly notorious for selling the party's publication Roter Morgen in front of the factory gates of local heating systems manufacturer Seppelfricke. According to a former comrade, most of the factory's workers chose him as their general practitioner. His doctor's office was decorated with photographs from Albania, and had copies of Roter Morgen and of Dritëro Agolli's Commissar Memo available, until he left the KPD/ML in the mid-eighties. While Gedeon initially remained active in Germany's anti-nuclear and peace movement as a member of the International Physicians for the Prevention of Nuclear War (IPPNW), he gradually turned to pendulum dowsing and other esoteric practices.

== AfD politician ==
In 2006, Gedeon retired and moved to Rielasingen-Worblingen near Konstanz. In April 2013, he joined the Alternative for Germany (AfD) and was appointed first speaker of the party's local chapter in the Konstanz district. Gedeon, who is associated with the party's hard right wing, entered the Baden-Württemberg parliament in the state's 2016 regional election, where the AfD received a record result of 15.1% from scratch.

=== Accusations of antisemitism ===
In June 2016, a number of books authored by Gedeon came under crossfire following a report by the Amadeu Antonio Foundation. Gedeon was accused of blaming Jews for antisemitic resentments in his 2012 book Der grüne Kommunismus und die Diktatur der Minderheiten ("Green Communism and the dictatorship of minorities"), where Gedeon suggests that "Jews themselves brought about sufficient justification for the hostilities they had to face," a line of reasoning that the critic at Amadeu Antonio Foundation considered one of the most perfidious while also most common antisemitic patterns. Political scientist Armin Pfahl-Traughber, an expert on antisemitism and right-wing extremism who worked for the Verfassungsschutz and the Bundestag followed up with further evidence. Several passages in the second volume of Gedeon's trilogy Christlich-europäische Leitkultur, published in 2009 under the pseudonym "W. G. Meister", made clear that Gedeon was a proponent of antisemitic conspiracy theories, who repudiates all evidence of The Protocols of the Elders of Zion being a forgery.

Frankfurter Allgemeine Zeitung learned that Gedeon considers the convicted neo-Nazi Holocaust deniers Horst Mahler and Ernst Zündel as mere "dissidents", an assessment he repeatedly voiced in both works, which were all printed by German vanity publisher R. G. Fischer. AfD Baden-Württemberg's vice chair Marc Jongen confessed in the German New Right's newspaper Junge Freiheit that Gedeon's Leitkultur trilogy made him shiver the more he studied it, summarizing that Gedeon sees the influence of Judaism behind every intellectual or political step that helped build the modern world with its secular Rechtsstaat, democracy and liberal market economy, and its free and mature citizens. Gedeon literally denigrates all of these achievements as manifestations of "individual or general societal degeneration", or a regression behind Christendom which he considers as "essentially antijudaistic." All in all, Jongen characterizes Gedeon as a prototypical antisemitic conspiracy theorist, nonwithstanding his quibbling dissociation from (racial) antisemitism.

Historian Marcus Funck from the Berlin-based Center for Research on Antisemitism identified antisemitism on three levels: primarily, ideologemes straightly derived from the historical antisemitism of the 19th and the early 20th century; secondly, imaginations of a Zionist world conspiracy, in Gedeon's books also featuring clear anti-American elements; and on a third level a secondary antisemitism in form of the relativization of the Holocaust, where Gedeon characterizes the Holocaust remembrance as a "civil religion."

In March 2020, he was thrown out of the party, but remained in contact with former colleagues. On 5 July, Gedeon was forced to temporarily stay off the party's caucus. The controversy led to the state party being split into two camps and caucuses.

== Personal life ==
Gedeon is married and has three children.
