= Łukawica, Świętokrzyskie Voivodeship =

Łukawica
- Village
- Location within Poland
- Coordinates: 50°36′51″N 21°17′41″E
- Country: Poland
- Voivodeship: Świętokrzyskie
- County: Staszów
- Gmina: Staszów
- Sołectwo: Łukawica
- Elevation: 225.1 m (739 ft)

Population (31 December 2009 at Census)
  - Total: ▼265
- Time zone: UTC+1 (CET)
  - Summer (DST): UTC+2 (CEST)
- Postal code: 28-200
- Area code: +48 15
- Car plates: TSZ

Łukawica [wukaˈvit͡sa] is a village in the administrative district of Gmina Staszów, within Staszów County, Świętokrzyskie Voivodeship, in south-central Poland. It lies approximately 11 km (7 mi) north-east of Staszów and 58 km (36 mi) south-east of the regional capital Kielce.
