= Krzczonowice, Staszów County =

Krzczonowice
- Village
- Location within Poland
- Coordinates: 50°30′39″N 21°05′59″E
- Country: Poland
- Voivodeship: Świętokrzyskie
- County: Staszów
- Gmina: Staszów
- Sołectwo: Krzczonowice
- Elevation: 193.4 m (635 ft)

Population (31 December 2009 at Census)
  - Total: ▼268
- Time zone: UTC+1 (CET)
  - Summer (DST): UTC+2 (CEST)
- Postal code: 28-200
- Area code: +48 15
- Car plates: TSZ

Krzczonowice [kʂt͡ʂɔnɔˈvit͡sɛ] is a village in the administrative district of Gmina Staszów, within Staszów County, Świętokrzyskie Voivodeship, in south-central Poland. It lies approximately 8 km (5 mi) south-west of Staszów and 54 km (34 mi) south-east of the regional capital Kielce.
