= Wiązownica-Kolonia =

- Colony
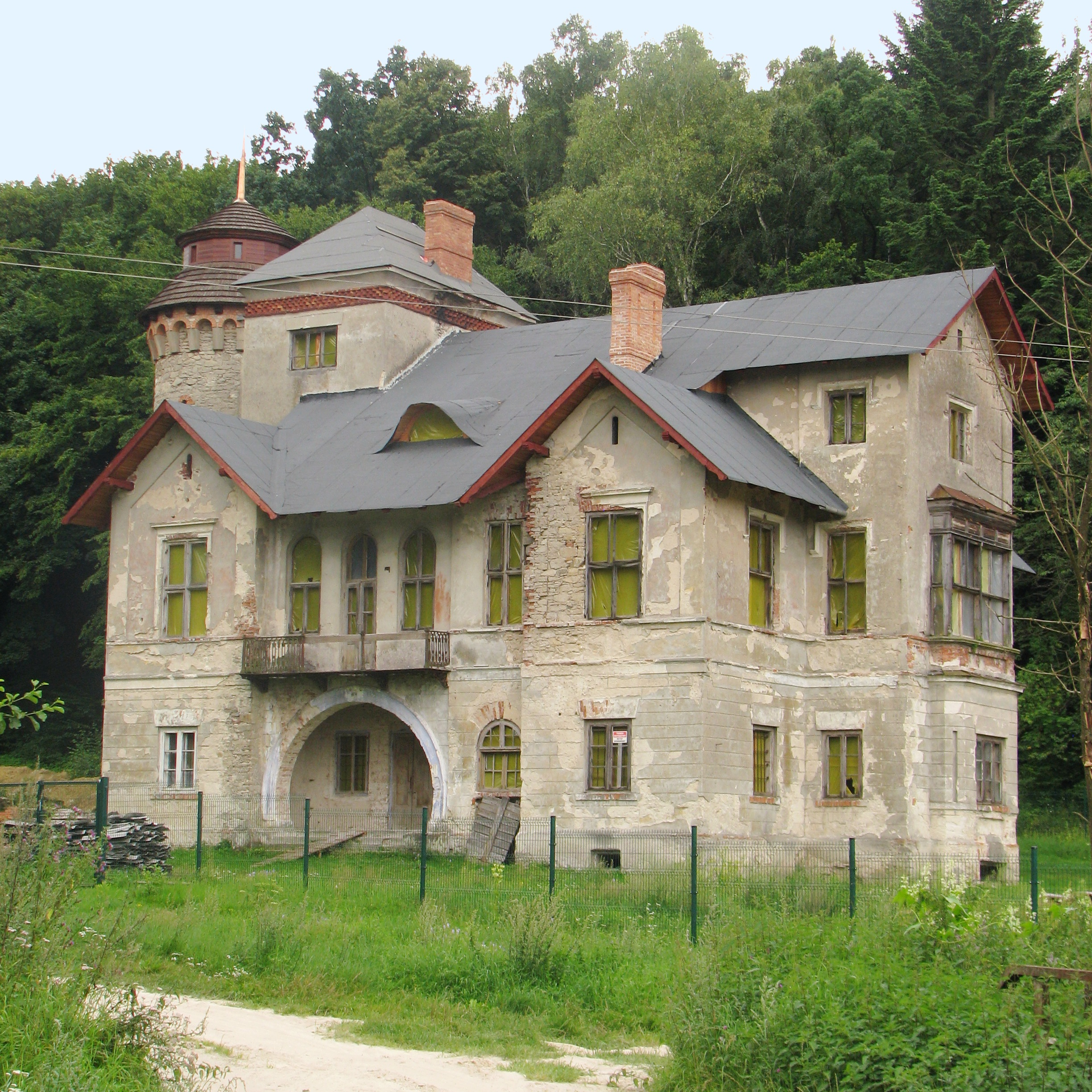
- Palace

- Location within Poland
- Coordinates: 50°35′10″N 21°24′03″E
- Country: Poland
- Voivodeship: Świętokrzyskie
- County: Staszów
- Gmina: Staszów
- Sołectwo: Wiązownica-Kolonia
- Elevation: 188.4 m (618 ft)

Population (31 December 2009 at Census)
  - Total: ▲615
- Time zone: UTC+1 (CET)
  - Summer (DST): UTC+2 (CEST)
- Postal code: 28-200
- Area code: +48 15
- Car plates: TSZ

Wiązownica-Kolonia [vjɔ̃zɔvˈnit͡sa kɔˈlɔɲa] is a colony in the administrative district of Gmina Staszów, within Staszów County, Świętokrzyskie Voivodeship, in south-central Poland. It lies approximately 17 km (11 mi) east of Staszów and 64 km (40 mi) south-east of the regional capital Kielce.
