= Kopanina, Świętokrzyskie Voivodeship =

Kopanina
- Village
- Location within Poland
- Coordinates: 50°35′44″N 21°10′08″E
- Country: Poland
- Voivodeship: Świętokrzyskie
- County: Staszów
- Gmina: Staszów
- Sołectwo: Kopanina
- Elevation: 206.3 m (677 ft)

Population (31 December 2002 at Census)
  - Total: 116
- Time zone: UTC+1 (CET)
  - Summer (DST): UTC+2 (CEST)
- Postal code: 28–200
- Area code: +48 15
- Car plates: TSZ

Kopanina [kɔpaˈnina] is a village in the administrative district of Gmina Staszów, within Staszów County, Świętokrzyskie Voivodeship, in south-central Poland. It lies approximately 4 km (2 mi) north of Staszów and 51 km (32 mi) south-east of the regional capital Kielce.
