= Lenartowice, Świętokrzyskie Voivodeship =

Lenartowice
- Village
- Location within Poland
- Coordinates: 50°30′12″N 21°05′14″E
- Country: Poland
- Voivodeship: Świętokrzyskie
- County: Staszów
- Gmina: Staszów
- Sołectwo: Lenartowice
- Elevation: 187.4 m (615 ft)

Population (31 December 2009 at Census)
  - Total: ▼53
- Time zone: UTC+1 (CET)
  - Summer (DST): UTC+2 (CEST)
- Postal code: 28-225
- Area code: +48 41
- Car plates: TSZ

Lenartowice [lɛnartɔˈvit͡sɛ] is a village in the administrative district of Gmina Staszów, within Staszów County, Świętokrzyskie Voivodeship, in south-central Poland. It lies approximately 9 km (6 mi) south-west of Staszów and 55 km (34 mi) south-east of the regional capital Kielce.
