= Cham, Germany =

Cham
- Town
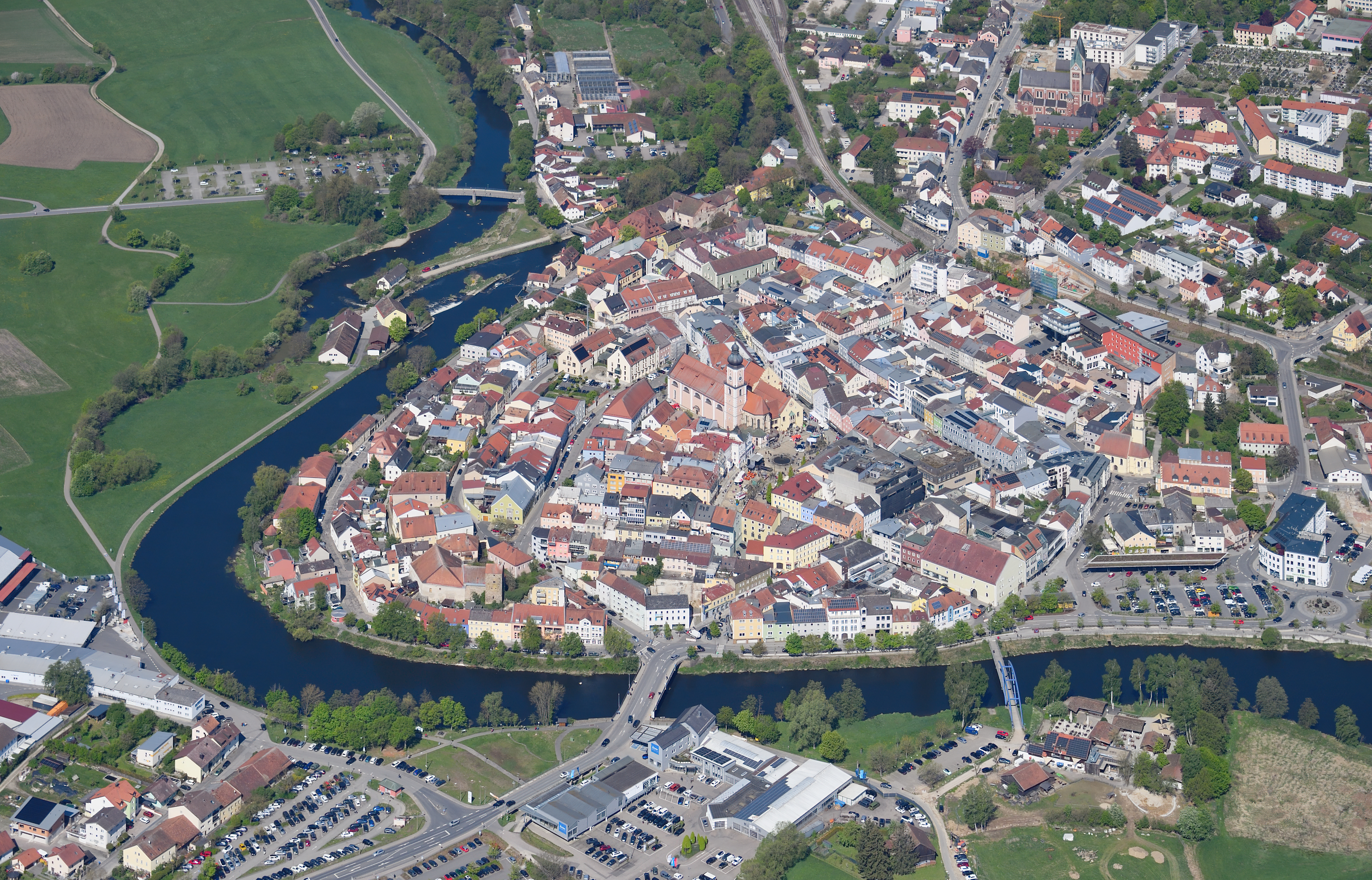
- Aerial view of Cham

- Coat of arms

- Location of Cham within Cham district
- Interactive map of Cham
- Location within Germany Location within Bavaria
- Coordinates: 49°13′N 12°39′E
- Country: Germany
- State: Bavaria
- Admin. region: Oberpfalz
- District: Cham
- Subdivisions: 53 Stadtteile

Government
  - Mayor (2020–26): Martin Stoiber (CSU)

Area
  - Total: 80.69 km^{2} (31.15 sq mi)
- Elevation: 370 m (1,210 ft)

Population (2025-12-31)
  - Total: 17,617
  - Density: 218.3/km^{2} (565.5/sq mi)
- Time zone: UTC+01:00 (CET)
  - Summer (DST): UTC+02:00 (CEST)
- Postal codes: 93413
- Dialling codes: 0 99 71
- Vehicle registration: CHA
- Website: www.cham.de

Cham (German pronunciation: [kaːm]; Czech: Kouba) is the capital of the district of Cham in the Upper Palatinate in Bavaria in Germany.

== Location ==
Cham lies within the Cham-Furth lowland, which is bordered on the south by the Bavarian Forest and on the north by the Oberpfälzer Wald. The city lies on the Regen River, which joins the Danube at Regensburg.

== Etymology ==
The name Cham is of Celtic origin and probably means "bend" or "curvature". In fact, a few kilometers from the city, a winding stream called the Chamb flows into the Regen; it probably gave its name to Cham, the first settlement at the bend of the larger river. Alternatively, the name may have derived from Kamm (comb). The city's coat of arms contains a comb. A partner city, also named "Cham" in Switzerland, is actually pronounced with an initial "ch" sound (Ach-Laut), whereas Bavarian Cham is pronounced with a /k/.

== History ==
Monks from Regensburg founded the Marienmünster, the first and oldest church in the Bavarian forest, at Chammünster in the 8th century. The first reference to Cham as a city appears in 976. An imperial castle of the Holy Roman Empire stood on the Galgenberg (German: "gallows hill"), providing protection for the trade route into Bohemia. Cham was granted its own currency in around 1000, the Cham Denar. The 12th century saw the town's location shifted to its current place. The Hussite Wars of the 15th century inflicted great hardships on the townspeople. In 1742, the Pandur troops of Franz Freiherr von der Trenck overran and destroyed the city.

Cham's first railway connection came in 1861. On April 18, 1945, a British air raid on the western part of Cham caused 63 deaths. The arrival of numerous German war refugees from Silesia and the Sudetenland swelled Cham's population from 5,860 to over 10,000.

The father of the French resistance fighter Jeannette Guyot, Jean-Marie Guyot, who likewise was a member of the resistance, was arrested in early 1944 and transported to Cham, where he died.

== International relations ==
Cham is twinned with:

- Cham, Switzerland
- Klatovy, Czech Republic
- Gainsborough, (United Kingdom) Great Britain
- Zele, Belgium

== Notable people ==
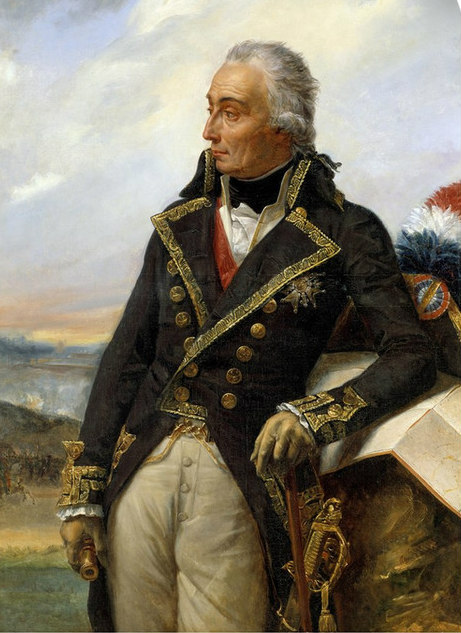
Nicolas Luckner

- Anne of Bohemia (1323–1338), a sister of Emperor Charles IV, later Duchess consort of Austria, Styria and Carinthia
- Nicolas Luckner (1722–1794), Marshal of France, to whom the Marseillaise was dedicated
- Karl Stern (1906–1975), professor of neurology and psychiatry, author; a street in Cham is named after him.
- Fritz Zängl (1914–1942), German skier, born in Katzbach, now Cham
- Ernie Stautner (1925–2006), German-born American football coach and poker player
- Wolfgang Gedeon (born 1947), physician, author and politician (AfD)
- Max Deml (born 1957), publisher, writer, entrepreneur
- Gerhard Hopp (born 1981), politician
- Christoph Janker (born 1985), football defender
- Jo Lindner (1991–2023), social media influencer
- Leony (born 1997), singer-songwriter
