= Bavarian Forest =

Region in Bavaria, Germany

Coordinates: 49°00′N 12°40′E

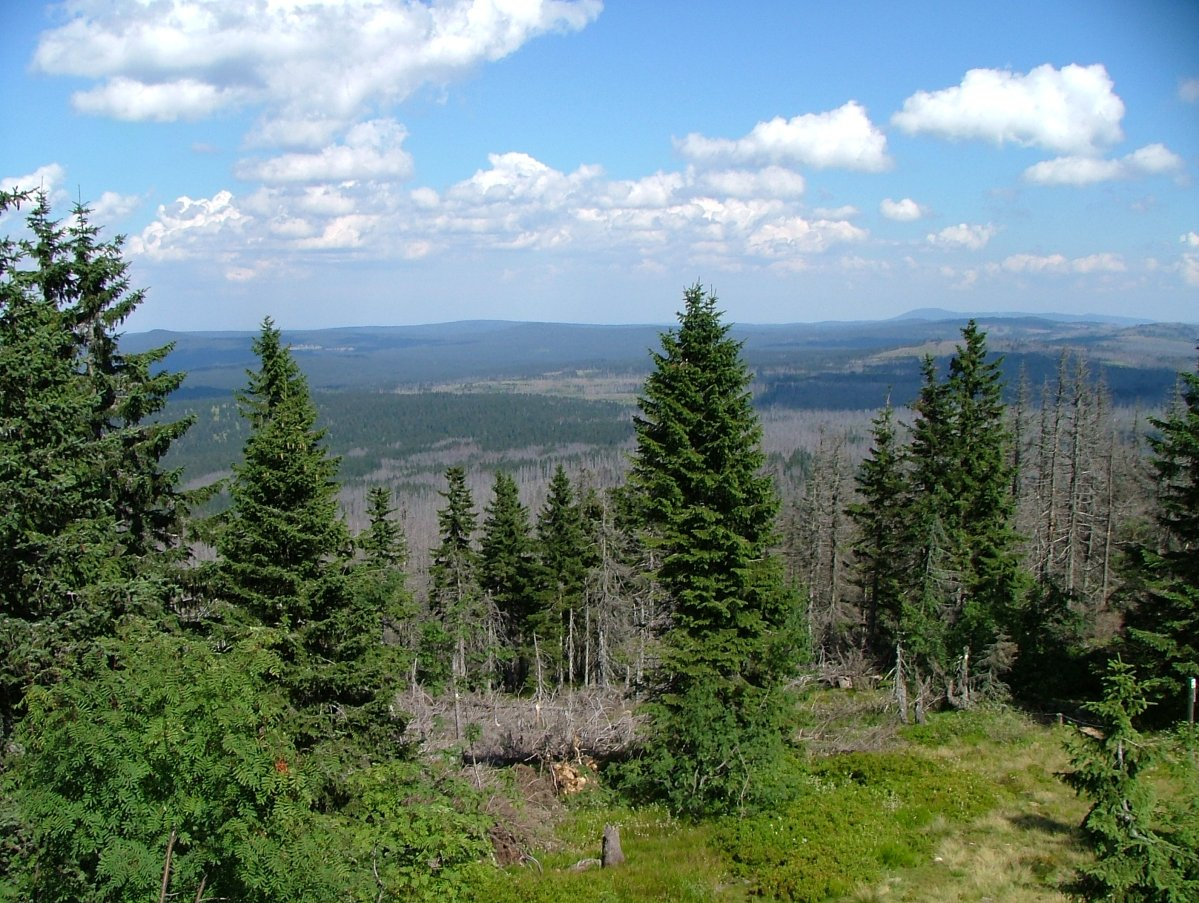
- Effects of bark beetle in the Bavarian Forest

Highest point
- Peak: Großer Arber (Great Arber)
- Elevation: 4,776 ft (1,456 m)

Naming
- Native name: Bayerischer Wald (German); Boarischa Woid_(Bavarian)

Geography
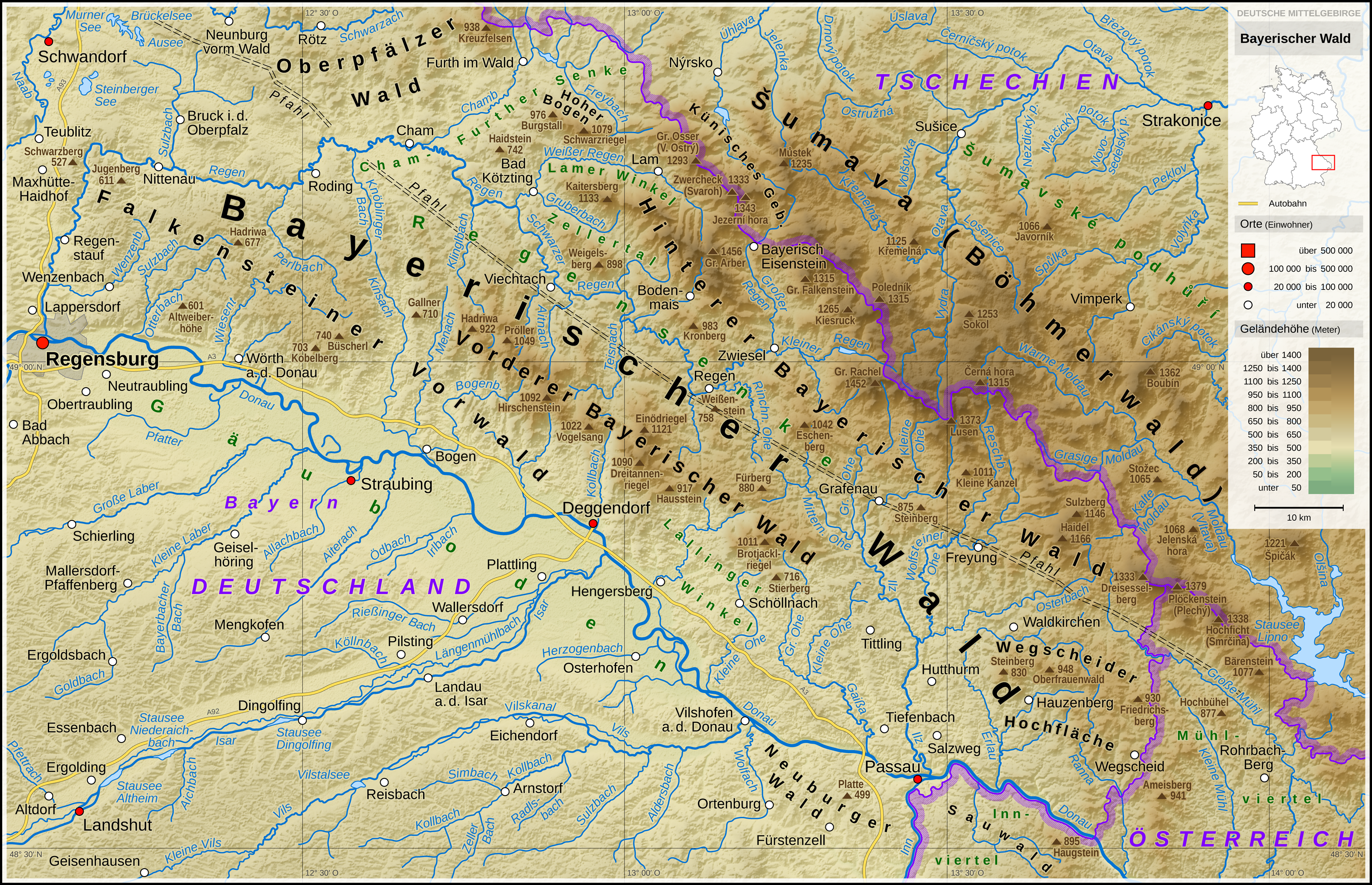
- Topography of the Bavarian Forest
- Country: Germany
- Region: Bavaria
- Parent range: Central Uplands; Bohemian Massif

Geology
- Orogeny: Variscan
- Rock type(s): Metamorphic Gneiss and Granite rocks

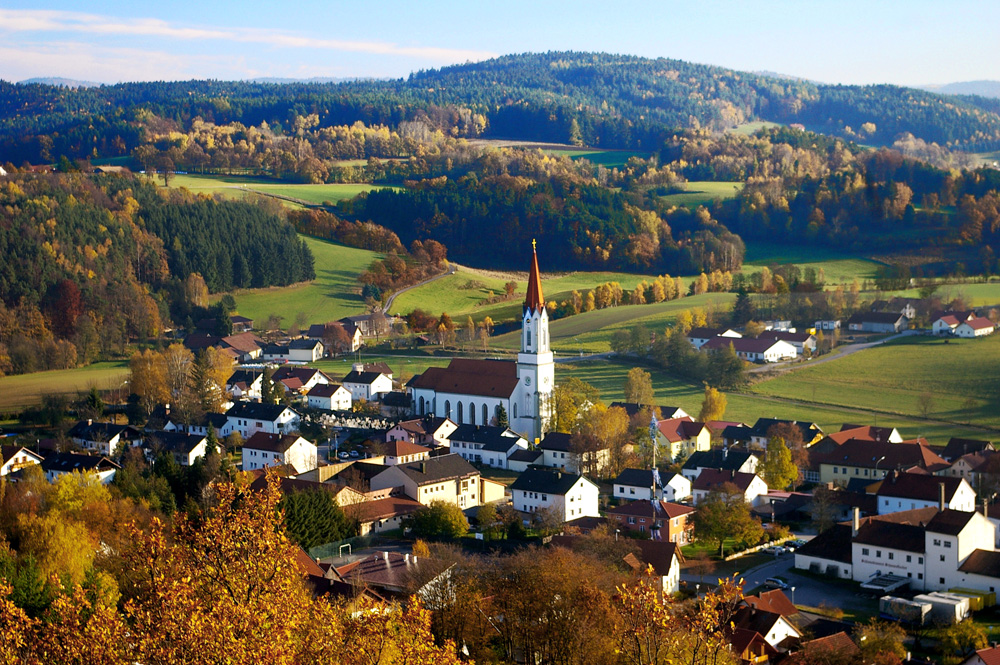
The village of Zell in the Bavarian Forest

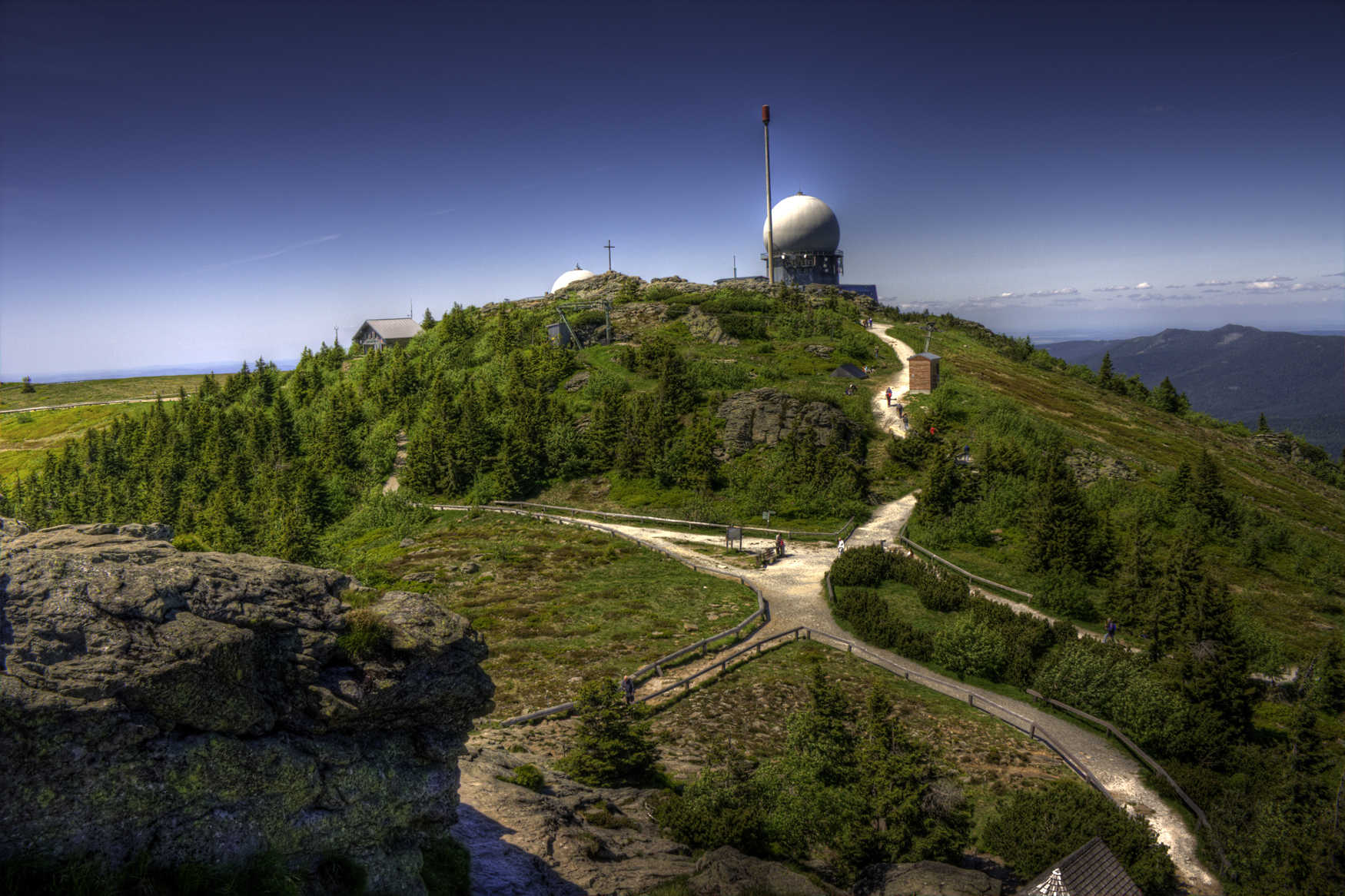
Summit of the Großer Arber with its summit cross and radome

The Bavarian Forest (German: Bayerischer Wald [ˈbaɪʁɪʃɐ ˈvalt] or Bayerwald [ˈbaɪɐvalt]; Bavarian: Boarischa Woid) is a wooded, low-mountain region in Bavaria, Germany, that is about 100 kilometres long. It runs along the Czech border and is continued on the Czech side by the Bohemian Forest (Czech: Šumava). Most of the Bavarian Forest lies within the province of Lower Bavaria, but the northern part lies within the Upper Palatinate. In the south it reaches the border with Upper Austria.

Geologically and geomorphologically, the Bavarian Forest is part of the Bohemian Forest - the highest of the truncated highlands of the Bohemian Massif. The area along the Czech border has been designated as the Bavarian Forest National Park (240 km^{2}), established in 1970 as the first national park in Germany. Another 3,008 km^{2} has been designated as the Bavarian Forest Nature Park, established 1967, and another 1,738 km^{2} as the Upper Bavarian Forest Nature Park, established in 1965. The Bavarian Forest is a remnant of the Hercynian Forest that stretched across southern Germania in Roman times. It is the largest protected forest area in central Europe.

The highest mountain in the region is the Großer Arber ("Great Arber", 1,456 m). The main river is the Regen, which is formed by the confluence of the White and Black Regen and flows out of the mountains towards the city of Regensburg.

== Overview ==
Together with the adjacent Upper Palatine Forest on the far side of the Cham-Furth Depression, and the Neuburg Forest south of Passau, the Bavarian Forest forms the largest contiguous area of woodland in Bavaria and, together with the Bohemian Forest and the Sauwald (its southeastern continuation towards Upper Austria), it forms one of the largest contiguous forests in Europe.

The Bavarian Forest is drained mainly by the Regen and Ilz rivers into the Danube, a small catchment near the Czech Republic drains into the Elbe via the Moldau.

The highest mountains of the Bavarian Forest are the Great Arber at 1,456 m and the Great Rachel (1,453 m). In the eastern part of the mountains, Germany's first national park, the Bavarian Forest National Park, was established in 1970. It was expanded in 1997 and, together with the Bohemian Forest National Park (Sumava National Park) in the Czech Republic, is one of the largest protected areas in Europe.

In older cartographic and lexical works, the term "Bavarian Forest" refers only to the mountainous region of the Danube Hills, also known as the Anterior Bavarian Forest (Vorderer Bayerischer Wald) or Vorderer Forest (Vorderer Wald), between the Danube and the Regen, which has its highest elevation in the Einödriegel. The "High Forest" or Hinterer Forest (Hinterer Bayerischer Wald) between the Regen and the Bohemian border, including the mountains of the Arber, Rachel and Lusen, used to be part of the Bohemian Forest. The linguistic usage of the German-Bavarian authorities, the impact of tourism, and the presence formerly of the Iron Curtain contributed to the fact that the term "Bavarian Forest" was increasingly extended to mean the entire low mountain region on the German side of the border between Bavaria and Bohemia. As a result of political developments after 1989, most recently the accession of the Czech Republic to the Schengen area, however, there is a discernible trend to see the low mountain range on the German-Czech border as a unit, especially in terms of tourism.

Tourism is important to the Bavarian Forest. Sharing the natural environment are walkers, the forestry industry and several ski resorts. Furthermore, the Bavarian Forest is known for its glassblowing in the area of Zwiesel and is also known in the field of geoscience as a result of the fundamental station of Wettzell at Bad Kötzting.

=== Geomorphology ===
The heart of the Bavarian Forest (in its broader sense) is divided into the Rear or High Bavarian Forest (Hinterer Bayerischer Wald) in the centre of the Bohemian Forest, the Regen valley and the Anterior Bavarian Forest (Vorderer Bayerischer Wald). In addition, there are the foothills of the two main ridges to the southeast and those of the Anterior Bavarian Forest to the northwest. Almost all of the crest-like mountain ridges run from northwest to southeast; apart from that the most important local landscapes are generally characterised by their natural regional and geomorphological nature:

==== High Bavarian Forest and Regen valley ====
The centre of the Bohemian Forest lies between Zwiesel in the west and Vimperk in the east. It is a low-relief plateau, which rises almost everywhere to above 1,000 m. Northwest, towards the Großer Falkenstein (1,315 m), the relief energy rises; on the far side of the Great Regen valley, this line continues, crest- or even arête-like into the Kunisch Mountains with the Seewand/Zwercheck. (up to 1,343 m) and Osser (up to 1,293 m), which are located directly on the German-Czech border. The lower-lying Fahrenberg (893 m) finally leads to the Hoher Bogen (up to 1,079 m) that descends into the Cham-Furth Depression.

However, the highest peaks of the low mountain range are found on a second ridgeline, southwest of the main ridge, and which also runs from northwest to southeast. The Arber (up to 1,456 m) is linked to the Seewand to the north by a mountain ridge; to the northwest the ridgeline crosses the Schwarzeck (1,236 m) and runs up to the Kaitersberg (1,133 m); the upper valley of the White Regen, the so-called Lamer Winkel, separates this ridge from that of the Kunisch Mountains. To the southeast of the Arber, this ridge is initially interrupted by the Zwiesel Basin, in which nestles the town of Zwiesel, but continues on the far side of the basin, with the Rachel (up to 1,453 m), the Lusen (1,373 m) and the Dreisesselberg (1,333 m), the other highest mountains of the Bavarian Forest and in the whole of the Bohemian Forest too. The crest continues beyond the borders of Bavaria, along the border between the Czech Republic and Austria, crossing the mountains of the Plöckenstein (1,379 m) and Hochficht (1,338 m).

The Zeller Valley (Zellertal), which stretches from Bad Kötzting via Bodenmais and northeast of Langdorf to Bettmannsäge and continues in relief terms as far as Spiegelau, separates a third, slightly lower ridgeline, which bounds the High Bavarian Forest to the southwest. Immediately to the southwest of this valley, the ridgeline runs from the Wurzer Spitz (817 m) via the Weigelsberg (898 m) and the Wolfgangriedel (876 m) to the Kronberg (984 m) and, behind the valley of the Black Regen, over the Eschenberg (1,043 m) to the Kreuzberg (788 m) at Oberkreuzberg.

To the southwest of this third ridge are the rolling hills or Hügelland of the Regen Depression borders. Many of the most important settlements of the inner Bavarian Forest such as Viechtach, Teisnach, Regen, Rinchnach and Kirchdorf im Wald are located here along the course of the Black Regen. The quartz lode known as the Pfahl runs roughly through the centre of the depression, following the main Hercynian direction.

==== Anterior Bavarian Forest or Danube Hills ====
To the south-west of the Regen depression is the Anterior Bavarian Forest (also called the Danube Hills), which is up to 1,121 m high. Its crest also runs roughly south-eastwards, but is clearly divided into individual ridges, each of which runs in a different direction.

In the far northwest are the Elisabethszell Mountains near the village of Elisabethszell, the line of which runs away to the southeast. At the Hadriwa they reach a height of 922 m. Immediately to the east are the Hirschenstein Mountains which are similarly oriented. Beginning at the Zeller Höhe (850 m), the northernmost mountain of the Anterior Bavarian Forest overall, this range climbs to 1,092 m) at the Hirschenstein. Southeast of the Hirschenstein lie the Vogelsangwald woods and the Vogelsang (1,022 m), which comprises only one ridge; it runs from north to south. On the northern extension of this ridge in the Regen valley lies the Hornbergwald forest, which reaches 844 m at the Abendberg and thus clearly towers above the floor of the basin.

Immediately east of the Vogelsang is the Grafling Saddle (Graflinger Paßsenke), which follows the valleys of the Kollbach and Teisnach rivers from Gotteszell in the north to Grafling in the south. It is the most prominent gap in the Anterior Bavarian Forest and is crossed by the Bundesstraße 11 which climbs up to a height of 583.7 m. Immediately to the east of the pass are the Riegel Mountains (Riegelbergen) with the Einödriegel (1,121 m) to the north and the Breitenauriegel (1,116 m) to the south of the highest point of the Anterior Bavarian Forest. South of it and separated by the state road, St 2135, is a chain of summits, the Hausstein Mountains (Haussteinberge) and Leopoldswald, running eastwards. The Hausstein reaches a height of 917 m, the Fürberg in the far east climbing to 880 m.

The most southerly mountain range, the Sonnenwald, is also a chain of individual peaks running from west to east; it is only connected to the Leopoldswald southwest of the Fürberg by a narrow ridge. In its western half, the Brotjacklriegel reaches 1,011 m, in the east the Aschenstein climbs to a height of 944 m. Even the mountains at the western and eastern ends of the mountain chain rise clearly above the 800 m line. To the south of the Brotjacklriegel, the isolated Stierberg (716 m), southwest of Zenting, bounds the Lallinger Winkel (see below) markedly in the east. It is usually considered part of the Passau Vorwald (see below).

==== Falkensteiner Vorwald ====
The westernmost part of the Bavarian Forest is the Falkensteiner Vorwald, which adjoins the Anterior Bavarian Forest. It has an unspectacular, humpy relief. Of the few mountains exceeding 700 m in height, the Gallner (709 m) is the most spectacular. It is located immediately west of the Elisabethszell mountains and is still marked by the relief of the Anterior Bavarian Forest. Even higher but clearly less prominent are an unnamed hill northwest of Zinzenzell at 720 m and a hill southeast of Wiesenfelden that reaches 740 m. In the south near the Danube, in the Waxenberger Forst, the Kobelberg reaches a height of 703 m.

Between Roding and Wiesent, the Falkensteiner Vorwald is divided centrally by a slight depression which follows the south-southwesterly course of the Regen near Roding. In the north it is used by Perlbach and in the south by the Wiesent. To the west of this depression, the Hadriwa is the highest point, reaching 677 m. All the mountains mentioned so far, except the Gallner, are situated around the market municipality of Falkenstein which gives its name to the forest-covered mountains.

The western part of the Vorwald transition in the south and on this side of the Regen into the Jurassic rocks of the Franconian Jura; Regenstauf being located at the boundary between the rock formations. Below Nittenau, the Regen breaks through the Vorwald impressively in a 90° bend and various smaller loops. The main summit in this high-relief part of the landscape, is the Jugendberg (611 m) immediately southwest of Nittenau, but more spectacular are the slopes of the 664 m high Gailenberg above the bend in the Regen. On the right-hand, western side of the Regen the Schwarzberg reaches at height of 538 m immediately east of Maxhütte-Haidhof.

In the north of the western part of the Falkensteiner Vorwald, there is a second, somewhat less prominent Regen water gap : the Reichenbach Regen valley (Reichenbach Regental) which begins at the bend in the Regen below Roding, runs through Walderbach and ends directly below Reichenbach. By contrast, the wider Regen valley section between the two water gaps from Treidling to the town of Nittenau, as well as the Roding Regen valley, belong to the adjoining Upper Palatine Hills, while the valley section by Cham is part of the Cham-Furth Depression.

==== Southeastern Bavarian Forest ====
To the southeast and adjacent to the Regen Depression and Anterior Bavarian Forest is the Passauer Vorwald and, beyond it, the Abteiland ("Abbey Land"), which on average is only a little hillier than the Regen valley. In the north of the region are the towns of Grafenau and Freyung, to the south is the Neuburg Forest, south of the Danube between Vilshofen and Passau. In the east, roughly from Waldkirchen, the Abbey Country transitions into the Wegscheid Plateau, which flows seamlessly into the Mühlviertel region of Lower Austria. This reaches a height of 948 m in the Frauenwald. To the west the Passauer Vorwald, south of the High Bavarian Forest and opposite its northern and northeastern perimeter mountains, descends into the Lallinger Winkel (Deggendorfer Vorwald) around 400 metres lower.

=== Geological structure ===
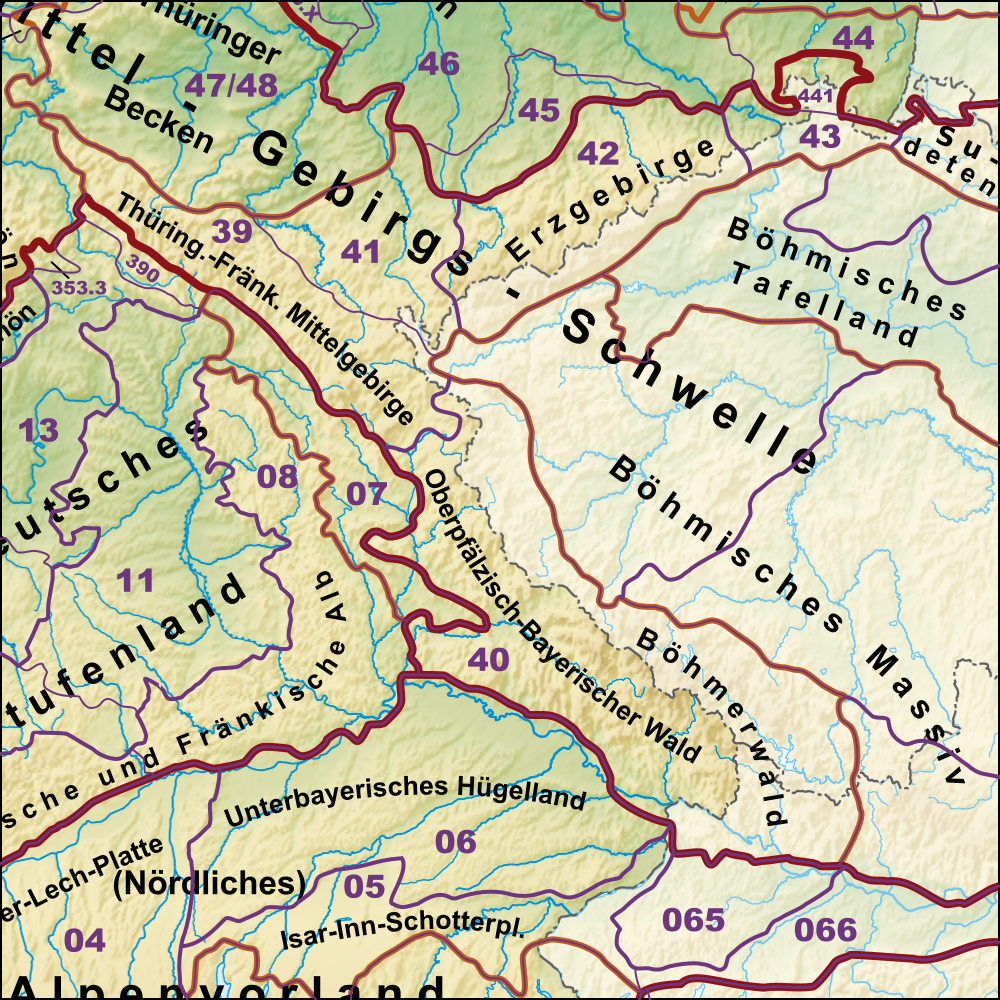
The major unit group of the Upper Palatine-Bavarian Forest (40) and its neighbouring regions

The Bavarian Forest is continued, initially northwest, then northeast, by the Upper Palatine Forest, Fichtel Mountains, Ore Mountains and Sudetes. Geologically, as the southwestern edge of the Bohemian Massif, it is indistinguishable from the Bohemian Forest on the other side of the Czech border and from the Sauwald on Austrian soil. Together with the Upper Palatinate Forest it forms the main unit group known as the Upper Palatine-Bavarian Forest.

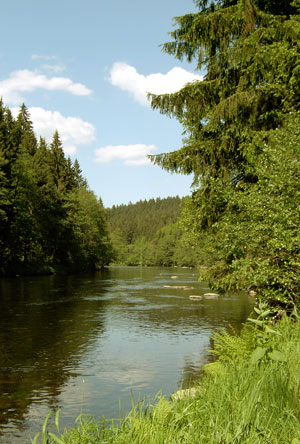
The River Regen

For the sake of simplicity, a distinction is not made between the Bohemian Forest (originally the Inner Bavarian Forest) and the Bavarian Forest. Instead, the common local name of "Bavarian Forest" is used for the entire area of the low mountain range on the German side, as the term "Bohemian Forest" has become synonymous with the areas in the Czech Republic. A distinction is only made between the Anterior Bavarian Forest and the High Bavarian Forest, with the lineament of the Bavarian Pfahl being regarded as the boundary line between them. In the north–south direction, a distinction is made between the Upper and Lower Forest.

The Bavarian Forest is the rump of a Palaeozoic mountain chain, whose bedrock is classified as Late Proterozoic to Silurian. After several phases of deformation and metamorphosis the mostly sedimentary, but also plutonic and volcanic, source rocks were metamorphosed over millions of years into the present-day gneisses. These gneisses were intruded by mighty granite rock especially in the Carboniferous and Early Permian. The Kunisch Mountains in the north are formed of schist, whilst the gabbro-amphibolite massif around Eschlkam and Neukirchen beim Heiligen Blut with the Hoher Bogen form the southernmost foothills.

An important line that divides the Bavarian Forest into two parts is the approximately 150-kilometre-long fault line of the Bavarian Pfahl. Originally created as a large-scale fault during the Upper Devonian to Upper Carboniferous, it was reactivated by fracture tectonics in the outgoing Palaeozoic and early Mesozoic to form a herringbone crack system (Fiederspaltensystem), which was filled with quartz by the penetration of hydrothermal solutions. Due to the strength of the rock, this quartz wall protrudes up to 30 metres above the surrounding area for long distances. North of the Pfahl is found mainly gneiss, south of it granite and migmatites tend to predominate.

Between Regensburg and Passau, there is a marked difference in height between the forested mountains to the northeast and the Danube plain ("Gäuboden") to the southwest. This dividing line between the Tertiary Hill Country and the Bavarian Forest is marked by the Danube Edge Fault (Donaurandbruch), a geological disruption between the sunken crystalline basement, lying beneath the Tertiary and Quaternary deposits of the molasse basin, and the still visible part northwest of this line, which belongs to the Bavarian Forest.

Quite striking too, is the difference in height between the Danube Plain, 300 to 350 m, and the highest peaks of the Anterior Forest, such as the Einödriegel at 1,121 m}, a difference of 800 metres in height over only a few kilometres of horizontal distance. Due to the uplift of the Bavarian Forest, which also affected the Neuburg Forest and the Sauwald, there was an antecedent incision of the rivers Inn and Danube into this area of the crystalline basement which led to the formation of a narrow valley zone from Pleinting down the Danube into Austria and south of Passau, where the Inn has formed a deeply incised riverbed.

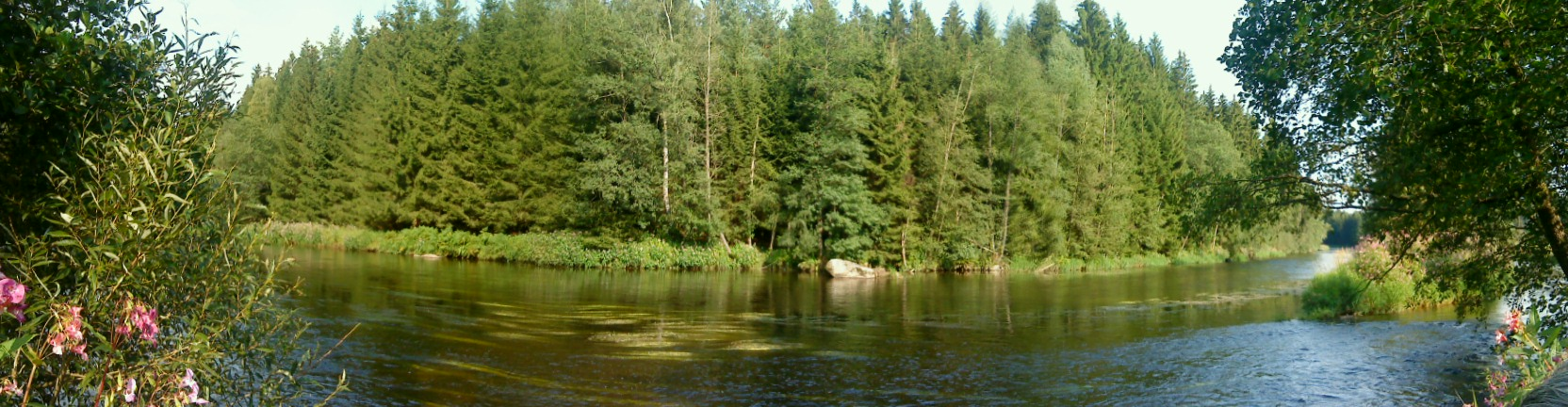
Panorama of the River Regen

=== Ice-Age landforms ===
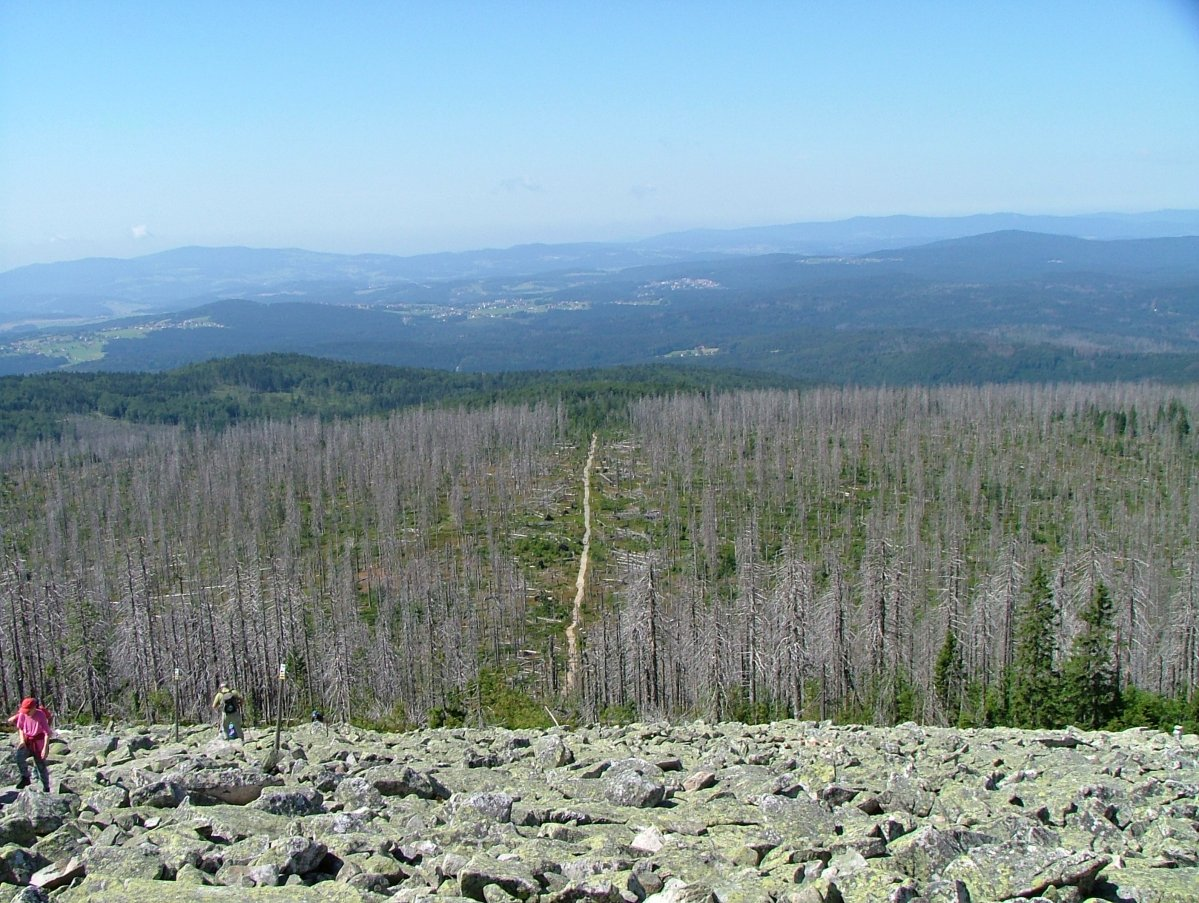
View from the summit of the Lusen of the Sommerweg ascent in the (south-)west

Whilst the Anterior Bavarian Forest only exceeds 1,000 m in a few places (for example, the Brotjacklriegel 1,016 m, Einödriegel 1,121 m, Breitenauriegel 1,114 m, Vogelsang 1,022 m, Hirschenstein 1,092 m and Pröller 1,048 m), most of the summit regions in the High Bavarian Forest are over 1300 up to 1,400 m (Plöckenstein 1,378 m, Dreisesselberg 1,333 m, Lusen 1,371 m, Großer Rachel 1,453 m, Kleiner Rachel 1,399 m, Kaitersberg 1,133 m, Großer Falkenstein 1,315 m, Großer Osser 1,293 m, Zwercheck 1,333 m, Großer Arber 1,456 m).

In particular, those regions of the High Bavarian Forest were covered by snow and ice fields during the Ice Age that also left their traces. Here, on the vast plateaux there were rather extensive firn fields rather than long glacial snouts. The thickness of the glacier ice at 1,050 m was about 125 metres. Where the glaciers made their way into the valley, one can still find glacial landforms such as cirques, caroids (Karoide) and cirque lakes (Großer Arbersee, Kleiner Arbersee, Rachelsee) as well as moraine banks.

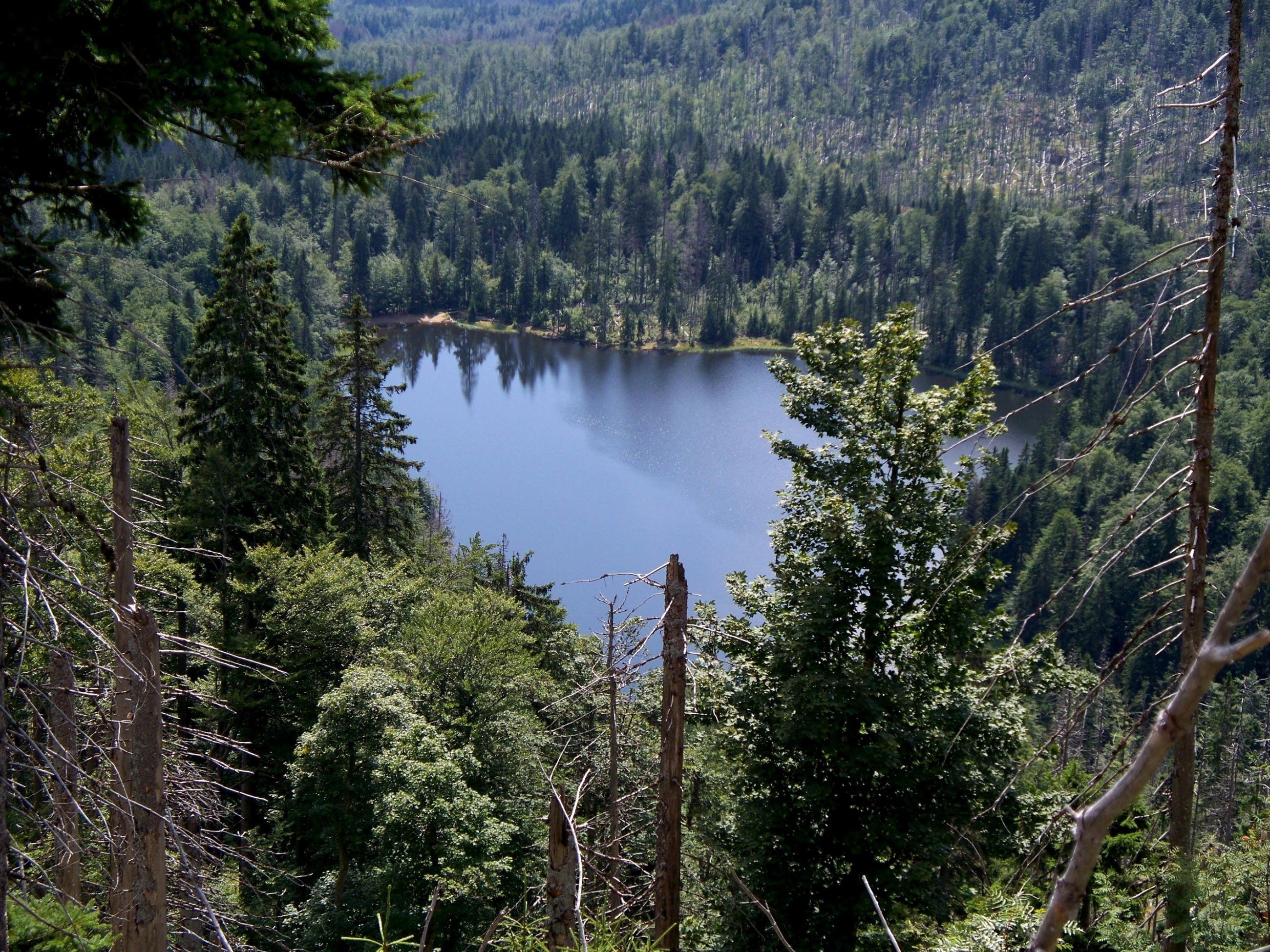
The Rachelsee

The toe of the glacier, for example near the Grosser Arbersee, was located at a height of 850 metres, the snout of the northern glacier down to the small Arbersee at a height of about 830 metres. Accordingly, there was a considerable difference in height of more than 600 metres from the summit regions to the terminal moraines. Other glacial tongues flowed down from the Grosser Rachel. Here too, there are cirques and caroids, which suggest ice-age glaciation.

== Places of interest ==
Amongst the places of interest in the Bavarian Forest are:

- National Park Information Centre in Neuschönau
- National Park Information Centre in Ludwigsthal

Nature

- The Pfahl, a 150 km long rock formation
- Teufelstisch ("Devil's Table") near Bischofsmais
- Buchberger Leite between Freyung and Ringelai
- Höllbachgspreng on the Großer Falkenstein
- The Schachten, former pasture land in the national park, between the Falkenstein and the Rachel
- Saußbach Gorge near Waldkirchen
- Valley of the Ilz
- Kleiner and Großer Arbersee lakes
- Wildlife park in Ludwigsthal
- Bavarian Forest Animal Park in Lohberg
- Open-air animal park near Neuschönau
- Frauenau Reservoir

Observation towers

- Canopy walkway in the Bavarian Forest National Park near Neuschönau

Culture

- Gabreta Celtic village near Ringelai
- Bavarian Forest Museum Village by the Dreiburgensee lake
- Finsterau Open-Air Museum
- Weißenstein Castle ruins near Regen with the "Glass Forest" (Gläserner Wald)
- Hunting and Fishing Museum at Schloss Wolfstein in Freyung
- Agricultural Museum in Regen
- Forest Museum in Zwiesel
- Frauenau Glass Museum in Frauenau
- Church of the Assumption of the Virgin Mary in Frauenau
- Wolfstein Gallery in Freyung
- Fürstenzeche Historic Silver and Fluospar mine in Lam
- Mine on the Silberberg near Bodenmais
- Baptist Kitzlinger Ski Jumps in Breitenberg
- Church of the Sacred Heart in Ludwigsthal
- Former abbey church at Rinchnach

== Mountains ==
The following is a list of the mountains in the Bavarian Forest, sorted alphabetically with heights given in metres (m) above sea level (NN):

- Almberg (1,139 m)
- Alzenberg (1,100 m)
- Arber, Großer (1,456 m)
- Arber, Kleiner (1,384 m)
- Aschenstein (945 m)
- Bernhardsnagel (896 m)
- Bistand (865 m)
- Büchelstein (831 m)
- Breitenauriegel (1,114 m)
- Brotjacklriegel (1,011 m)
- Burgstall (976 m), see Hoher Bogen
- Dreisesselberg (1,333 m)
- Dreitannenriegel (1,092 m)
- Eckstein (1,073 m), see Hoher Bogen
- Eschenberg (1,043 m)
- Einödriegel (1,121 m)
- Enzian (1,285 m)
- Falkenstein, Großer (1,315 m)
- Falkenstein, Kleiner (1,190 m)
- Farrenberg (1,203 m)
- Friedrichsberg (934 m)
- Fürberg (880 m)
- Geißkopf (1,097 m)
- Geißlstein (920 m)
- Geißriegel (1,046 m)
- Grandelberg (1,010 m)
- Gsengetstein (952 m)
- Guntherstein (796 m)
- Hahnenbogen (1,257 m)
- Hahnenriegel (1,108 m)
- Haibühler Spitz (1,047 m)
- Haidel (1,167 m)
- Haidstein (742 m)
- Harlachberger Spitz (913 m)
- Hausstein (917 m)
- Hennenkobel (965 m)
- Hessenstein (878 m)
- Heugstatt (1,261 m)
- Hindenburgkanzel (1,049 m)
- Hirschberg (1,039 m)
- Hirschenstein (1,095 m)
- Hochberg (942 m)
- Hochstein (Arnbruck) (1,132 m)
- Hochzellberg (1,208 m)
- Hoher Bogen (1,079 m)
- Hoher Filzberg (1,279 m)
- Hoher Stein (1,042 m) - see Kaitersberg
- Hohlstein (1,196 m)
- Hörndl (1,015 m)
- Kaitersberg (1,132)
- Kanzel (1,011 m)
- Käsplatte (979 m)
- Kiesruck (1,265 m)
- Knogl (1,056 m)
- Kreuzfelsen (999 m)
- Kronberg (984 m)
- Lackenberg (1,337 m)
- Lichtenberg (1,030 m)
- Lusen (1,373 m)
- Mittagsplatzl (1,340 m)
- Mittagstein (1,034 m)
- Mühlriegel (1,080 m)
- Oberfrauenwald (948 m)
- Ödriegel (1,156 m)
- Osser, Großer (1,293 m)
- Osser, Kleiner (1,266 m)
- Plattenhausenriegel (1,376 m)
- Bayerischer Plöckenstein (1,365 m)
- Predigtstuhl (1,024 m)
- Pröller (1,048 m)
- Rachel, Großer (1,453 m)
- Rachel, Kleiner (1,399 m)
- Rauchröhren (1,045 m), see Kaitersberg
- Rauher Kulm (1,050 m)
- Riedelstein, Großer (1,132 m)
- Riesberg, Lindberg (934 m)
- Riesberg, Viechtach (882 m)
- Riesberg, Rattiszell (602 m)
- Rollmannsberg (1,042 m)
- Rote Höhe (1,050 m)
- Ruhmannsberg (863 m)
- Rukowitzberg (1,269 m)
- Schwarzeck (1,238 m)
- Schwarzkopf (1,060 m)
- Schwarzriegel (1,079 m), see Hoher Bogen
- Scheuereckberg (1,196 m)
- Siebensteinkopf (1,263 m)
- Silberberg (955 m)
- Staffelberg (793 m)
- Steinberg (830 m)
- Steinbühler Gesenke (1,044 m) - see Kaitersberg
- Steinfleckberg (1,341 m)
- Sternknöckel (818 m)
- Sulzberg (1,146 m)
- Teufelstisch (901 m)
- Vogelsang (1,022 m)
- Wagensonnriegel (959 m)
- Wagnerspitze (1,125 m)
- Waldhäuserriegel (1,151 m)
- Weigelsberg (898 m)
- Wolfgangriegel (876 m)
- Zwercheck (1,333 m)

== See also ==
- Bavarian Forest Club
