= Hochstein =

Hochstein may refer to:

- Hochstein (surname)
- Hochstein (Arnbruck), a mountain of Bavaria, Germany
- Hochstein (Eifel), a volcanic conic in Rhineland-Palatinate, Germany
- Hochstein (Elstra), a mountain of Saxony, Germany
- Hochstein (Lawalde), a mountain of Saxony, Germany
- Hochstein (rocks), a rock formation in Rhineland-Palatinate, Germany
- Hochstein Ridge, a ridge of Antarctica
- Hochstein School of Music & Dance in Rochester, New York
