= Ruhmannsberg =

Mountain near Hauzenberg, Germany

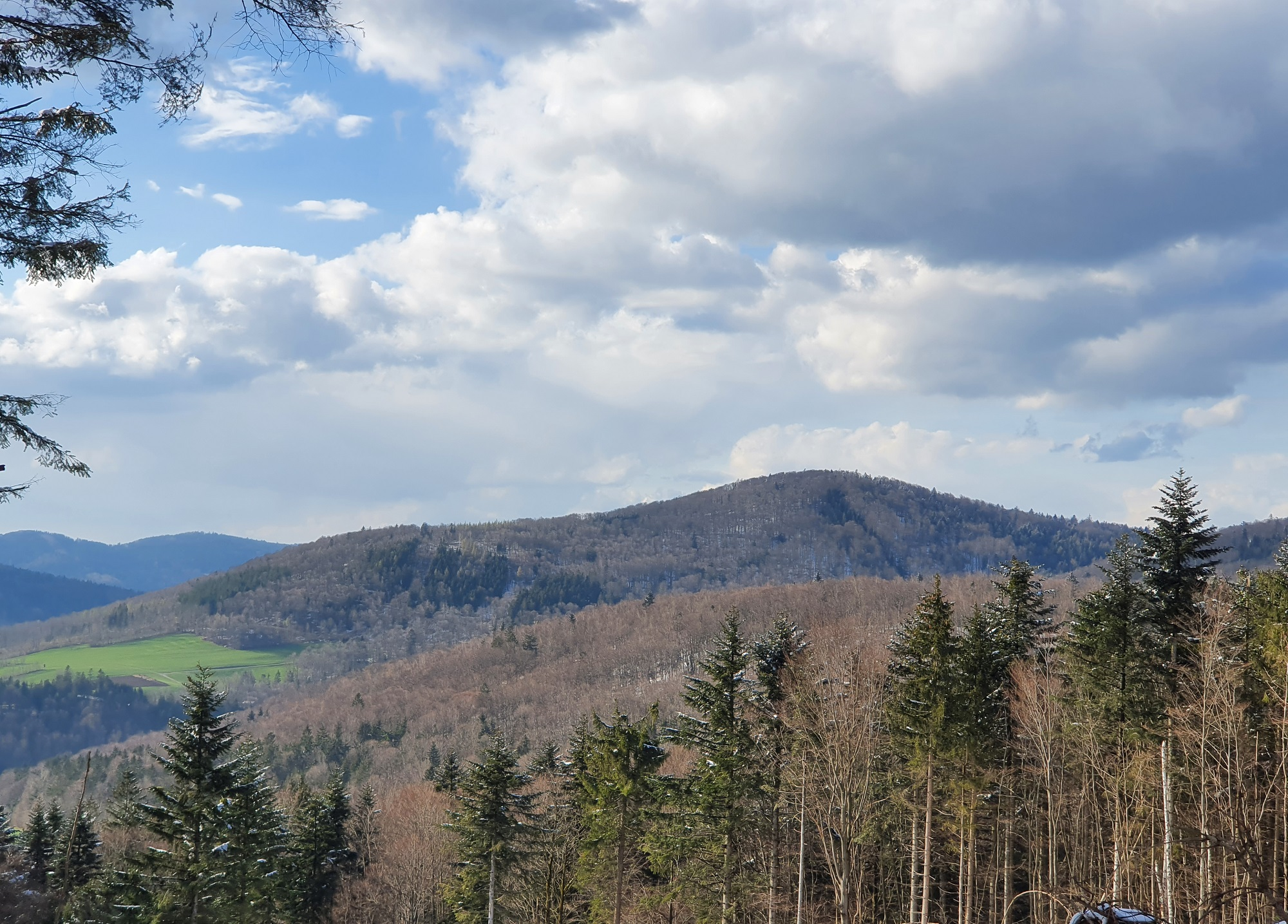

Highest point
- Elevation: 862.1 m above sea level (NN) (2,828 ft)
- Coordinates: 48°38′50″N 13°41′08″E

Geography
- Location within Bavaria
- Location: Passau, Lower Bavaria, Germany
- Parent range: Frauenwaldkamm, Bavarian Forest

The Ruhmannsberg is a mountain near Hauzenberg, a town in the Lower Bavarian county of Passau. Its summit is 863 metres high. At the foot of the mountain lie the villages of Kollersberg, Germannsdorf, Röhrendobel and Ruhmannsdorf. Nearby is the mountain of Staffelberg. On the Ruhmannsberg are many footpaths and forest tracks. The mountain is covered by woods and meadows.
