= Oberfrauenwald =

Mountain in Germany

Coordinates: 48°41′06″N 13°39′28″E

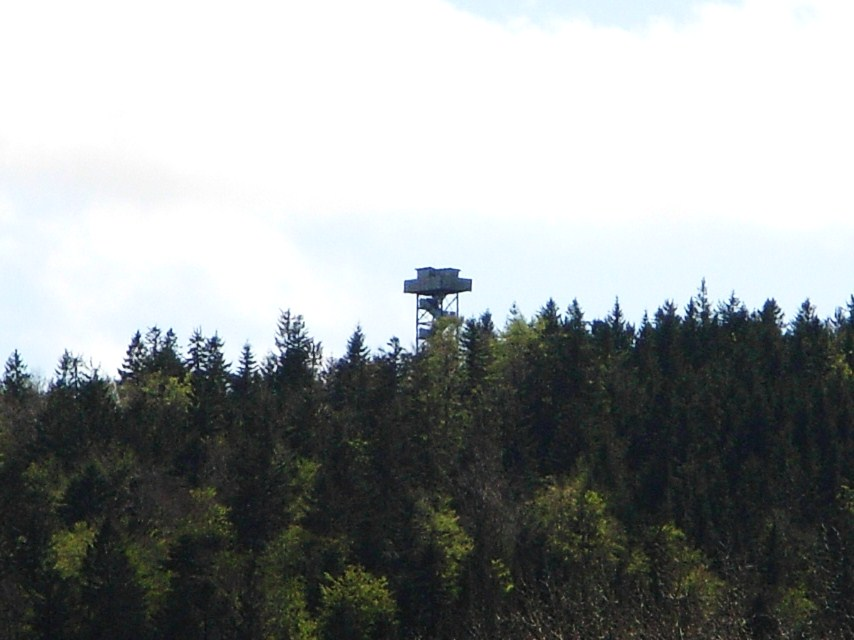
- The observation tower at the Oberfrauenwald

Highest point
- Elevation: 945 m (3,100 ft)

Geography
- Location: Bavaria, Germany

Oberfrauenwald is a 947.7 m (3,109 ft) high wooded mountain in the southern Bavarian Forest in Bavaria, Germany. It is positioned between the cities of Waldkirchen and Hauzenberg. The district borders between Passau and Freyung-Grafenau run over the mountain's peaks.

In 2001, a 27-meter high observation tower was erected at the top of the mountain. In 2013 a panoramic webcam was also added.

A hiking trail up the mountain starts in the small village of Oberfrauenwald. The peak can also be reached via a 15-minute walk from the car park of the mountain rescue service which is located close to the summit of the mountain.
