= Plattenhausenriegel =

Mountain in Germany

Coordinates: 48°57′51″N 13°26′57″E

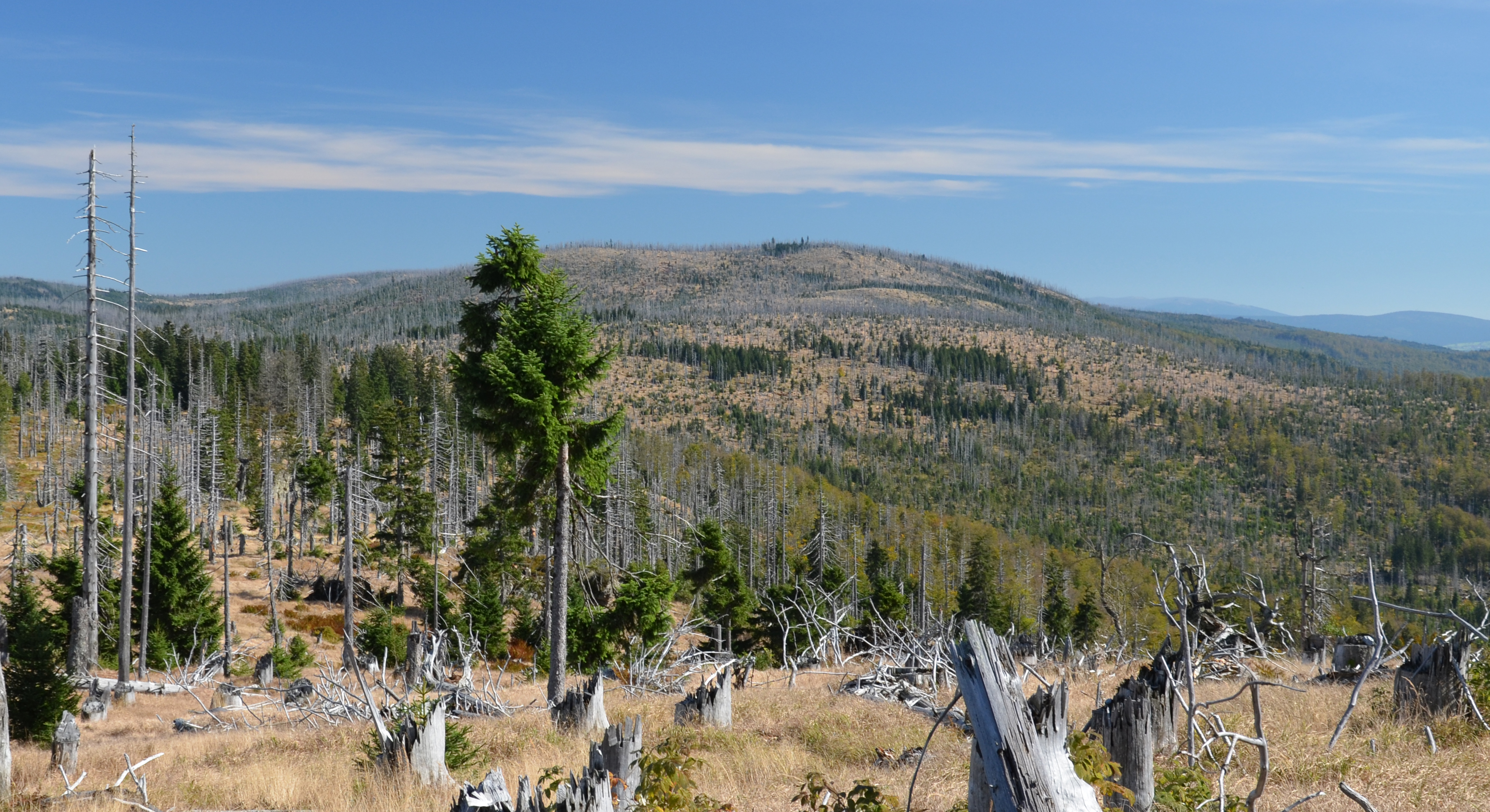
- Plattenhausenriegel mountain in Bavaria, Germany

Highest point
- Elevation: 1,372 m (4,501 ft)
- Prominence: 151 m (495 ft)
- Isolation: 4.4 km (2.7 mi)

Geography
- Location: Bavaria, Germany; Czech Republic

Plattenhausenriegel (Czech: Blatný vrch) is a mountain of the Bavarian Forest; (German: Bayerischer Wald) and Bohemian Forest, (Czech: Šumava) on the border between Germany and the Czech Republic
