= Haidel =

Mountain in Germany

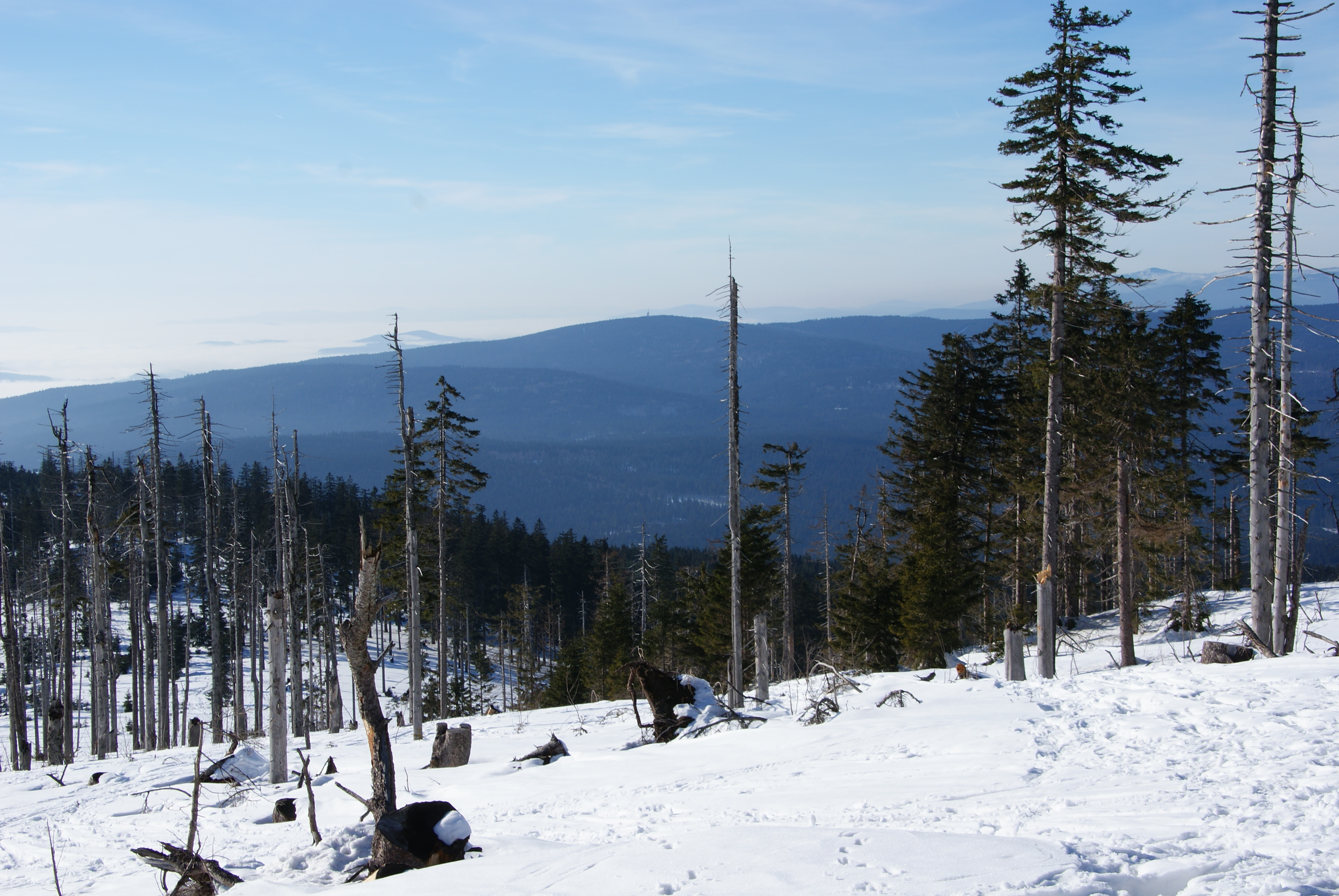
- View of Haidel

Highest point
- Elevation: 1,167 m (3,829 ft)
- Coordinates: 48°49′N 13°40′E

Geography
- Location within Germany Location within Bavaria
- Location: Bavaria, Germany
- Parent range: Bavarian Forest

Haidel is a mountain in the Bavarian Forest, Bavaria, Germany.

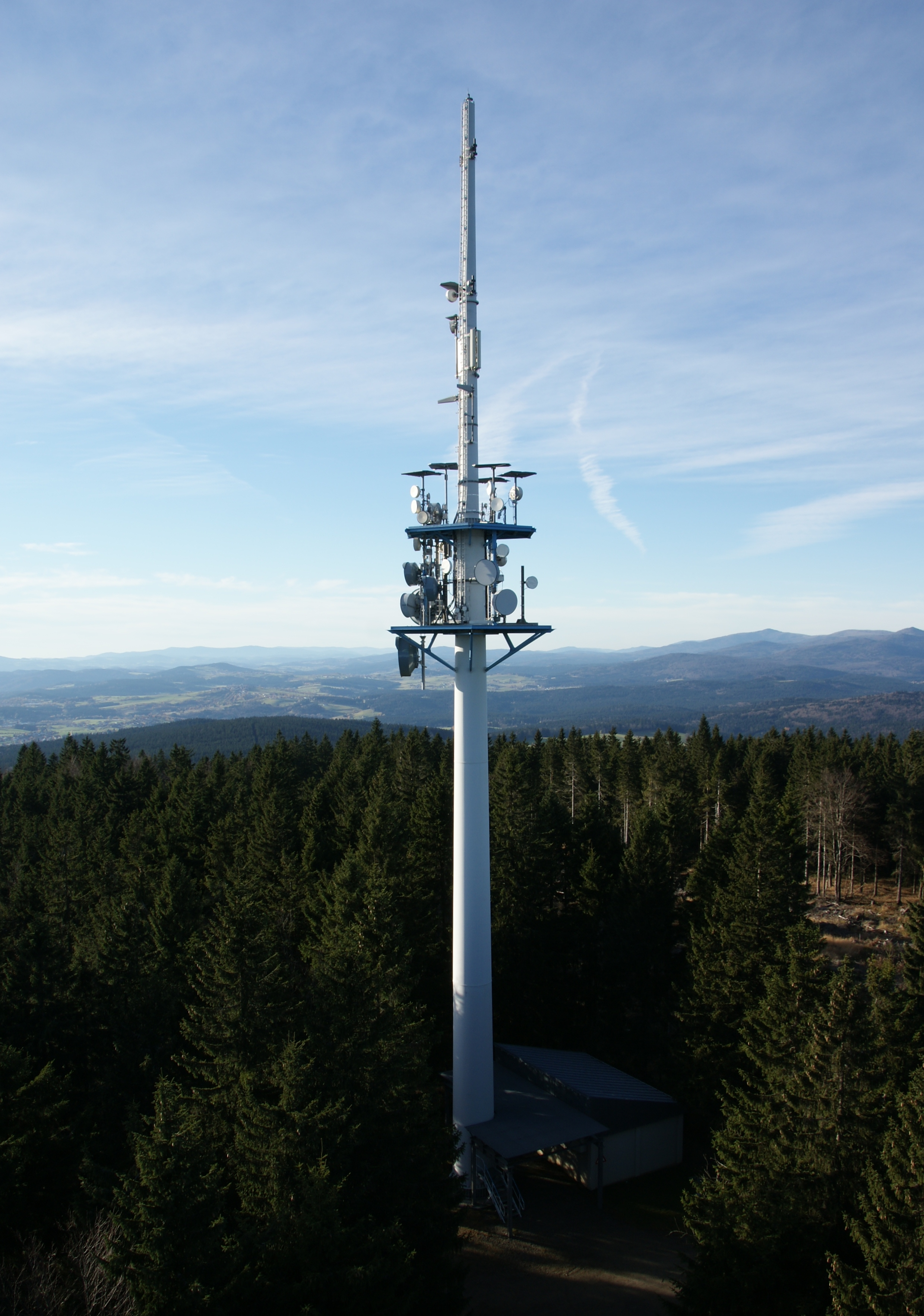
Telecommunication tower on the Haidel

== Haidel Tower ==
In 1925, a severe storm passed through the forest on Haidel, destroying the view of the Bavarian Forest and Bohemian Forest to the Alps from the summit. In order to prevent future disasters from destroying the view again, a 15-meter-high observation tower was built in 1934, though, it would be taken down in 1948 due to its state of disrepair.
