= Bienstand =

Mountain in Germany

- Location within Bavaria

Highest point
- Elevation: 865 m (2,838 ft)
- Coordinates: 48°53′39″N 13°23′37″E

Geography
- Location: Bavaria, Germany
- Parent range: Bavarian Forest

Geology
- Rock type: gneiss

The Bienstand, in several histories and novels called the Bistand, is a low mountain ridge, 865 m high, in the Bavarian Forest between the villages of Sankt Oswald-Riedlhütte and Grafenau, immediately south of the clearly higher mountains of the Rachel and Lusen, which lie within the Bavarian Forest National Park. Its name probably comes from the Middle High German ("bien"="near" and "stand"="forest pasture", see also Kirchlinger Stand) and means "near the forest pasture".

== Description ==
On the flat summit plateau stands a great wooden cross. The view to the south is open and, on föhn days extends to the chain of the Alps from the Dachstein to the Kaiser Mountains. Several waymarked footpaths lead up to the Bienstand from the surrounding villages; the nearest being Reichenberg and Höhenbrunn.
