= Mittagsplatzl =

Mountain in Germany

Coordinates: 49°05′37″N 13°08′34″E

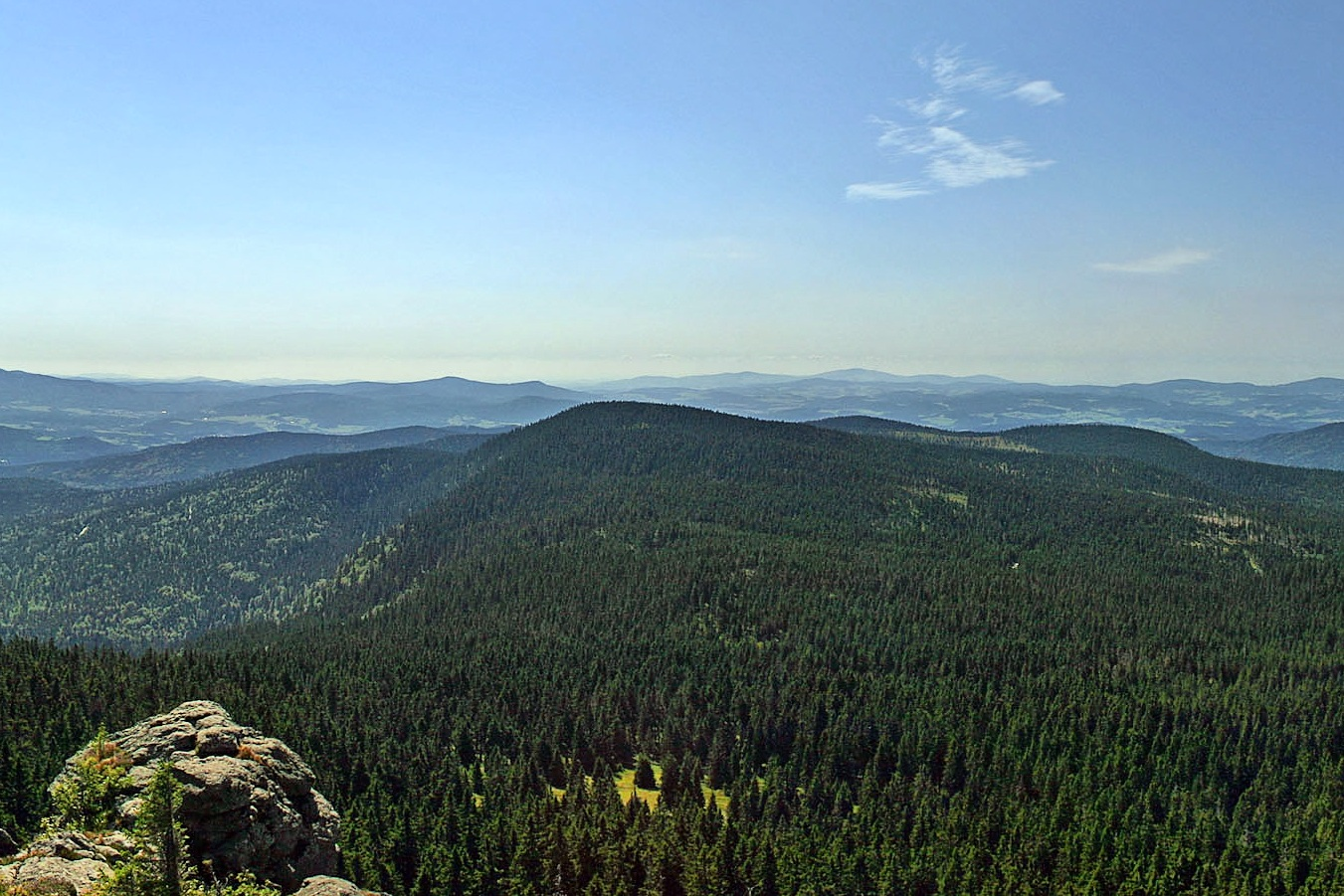
- Mittagsplatzl in Bavaria, Germany

Highest point
- Elevation: 1,340 m (4,400 ft)

Geography
- Location: Bavaria, Germany

Mittagsplatzl is a mountain and vantage point in the Bavarian Forest just south of the Bigger Arber and high above the Bigger Arber Lake.

There is a view of the Bigger Arber Lake, the Bohemian Forest, and the Bigger Falkenstein in the Bavarian Forest National Park. Mittagsplatzl is nestled around the town of Bodenmais, in Southern Germany.

Several marked hiking trails lead up from Bodenmais, including one from the Bigger Arber Lake through the Seewald, but this is rocky and only accessible to hikers.
