= Rachelsee =

Lake in Sankt Oswald-Riedlhütte, Bavaria, Germany

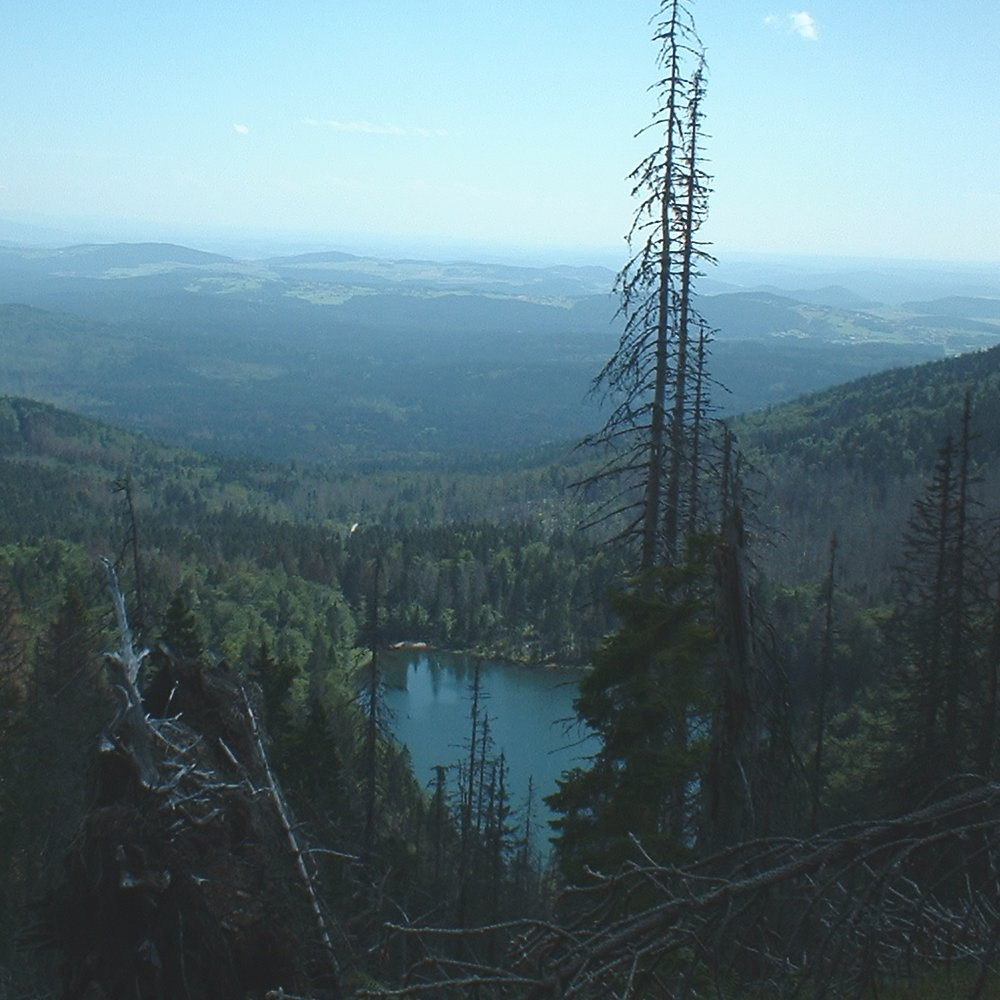

- Location within Bavaria
- Location: Bavarian Forest, Bavaria
- Coordinates: 48°58′31″N 13°24′07″E
- Primary outflows: Seebach
- Catchment area: 0.58 km^{2} (0.22 sq mi)
- Basin countries: Germany
- Max. length: 350 m (1,150 ft)
- Max. width: 205 m (673 ft)
- Surface area: 5.7 ha (14 acres)
- Average depth: 3.2 m (10 ft)
- Max. depth: 13.5 m (44 ft)
- Water volume: 180,000 m^{3} (6,400,000 cu ft)
- Surface elevation: 1,071 m (3,514 ft)

Rachelsee is a lake located in the Bavarian Forest, Bavaria, Germany. It lies at an elevation of 1071 metres and has a surface area of 5.7 hectares.
