= Alzenberg =

Mountain in Germany

- Location within Bavaria

Highest point
- Elevation: 1,146 m (3,760 ft)
- Coordinates: 48°53′44″N 13°37′35″E

Geography
- Location: Freyung-Grafenau, Bavaria, Germany
- Parent range: Bavarian Forest

Geology
- Rock type(s): gneiss, granite

The Alzenberg (1,100 m) is a mountain in the Bavarian Forest, northeast of the town of Freyung and lies in the Bavarian Forest National Park about two kilometres from the German-Czech border. It is almost entirely wooded.

The nearest settlement is the village of Mitterfirmiansreut in the municipality of Philippsreut. Neighbouring mountains are the Almberg (1,140 m) to the south and, in Czechia, the Strážný (1,115 m) to the northeast.
