= Waldhäuserriegel =

Mountain in Germany

Coordinates: 48°55′29″N 13°29′03″E

Highest point
- Elevation: 1,151 m (3,776 ft)

Geography
- Location: Bavaria, Germany

Waldhäuserriegel (1,151 m) is a mountain of Bavaria, Germany. It is located northeast of the city of Grafenau and lies in the protected Core Zone of the Bavarian Forest National Park, only two kilometers from the border between Germany and the Czech Republic. The summit is above the tree line, but the slopes are almost completely covered in coniferous alpine forest.

The nearest settlement is the district of Waldhäuser in the community of Neuschönau. The nearest mountains are Lusen (1,373 m) to the northeast and Hohlstein to the east (1,196 m).
