= Dreiburgensee =

Lake in Bavaria, Germany

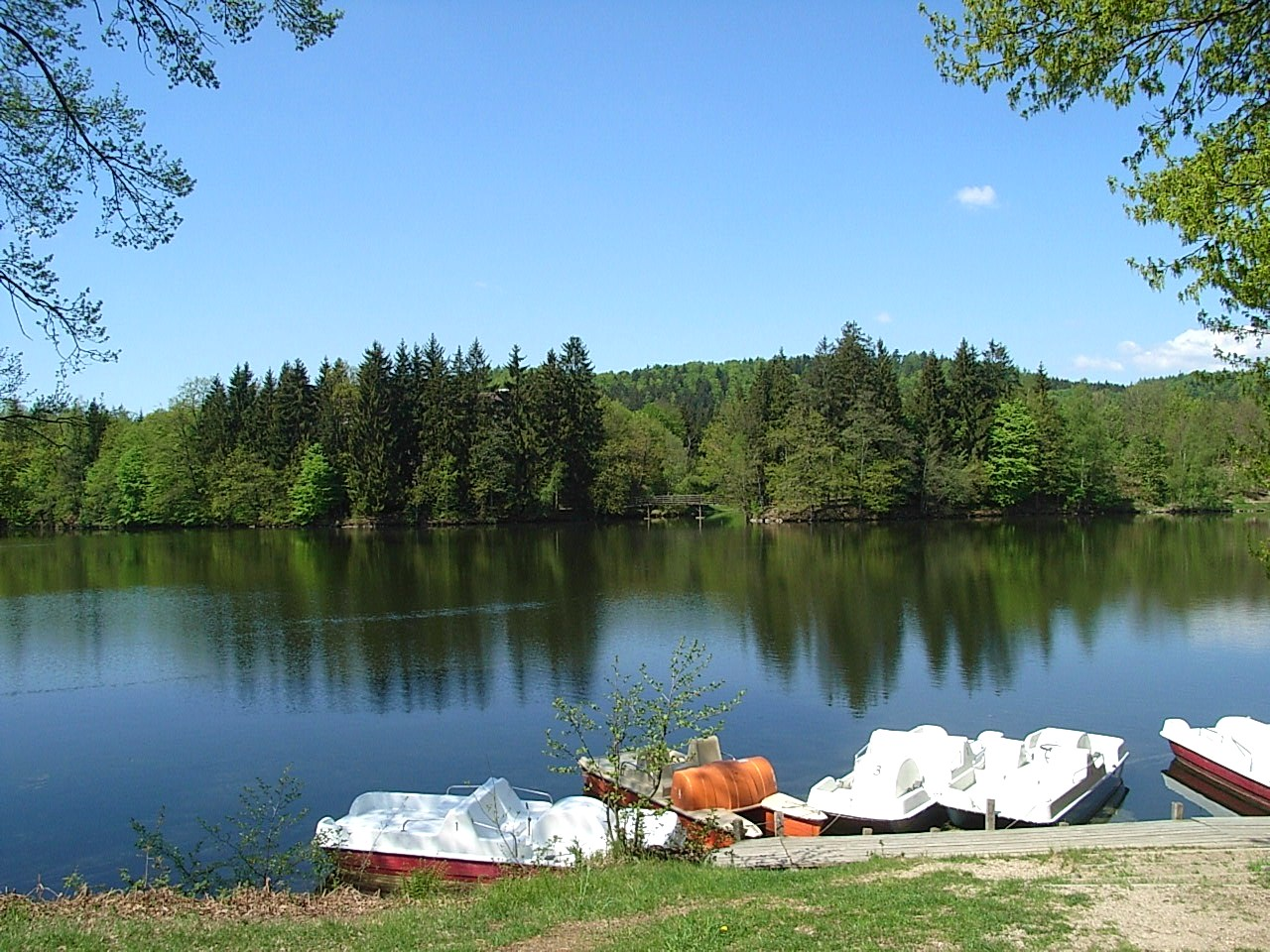

- Location within Bavaria
- Location: Bavarian Forest, Bavaria
- Coordinates: 48°44′38″N 13°21′9″E
- Primary inflows: Edtbach, Langbach
- Primary outflows: Lodermühlbach
- Basin countries: Germany
- Surface area: 0.8 km^{2} (0.31 sq mi)
- Max. depth: 7 m (23 ft)
- Surface elevation: 440 m (1,440 ft)

Dreiburgensee is a lake in the Bavarian Forest, Bavaria, Germany. It lies at an elevation of 440 metres and has a surface area of 0.8 km^{2}.
