= Wagensonnriegel =

Mountain in Germany

Coordinates: 48°56′58″N 13°16′58″E

Highest point
- Elevation: 959 m (3,146 ft)

Geography
- Location: Bavaria, Germany

Wagensonnriegel is a mountain of Bavaria, Germany.
