= Lichtenberg (Bavarian Forest) =

Mountain in Germany

Coordinates: 48°50′19″N 13°44′25″E

Lichtenberg (Bayerischer Wald)

Geography
- Location: Bavaria, Germany

Lichtenberg (Bayerischer Wald) is a mountain of Bavaria, Germany.
