= Hoher Filzberg =

Mountain in Germany

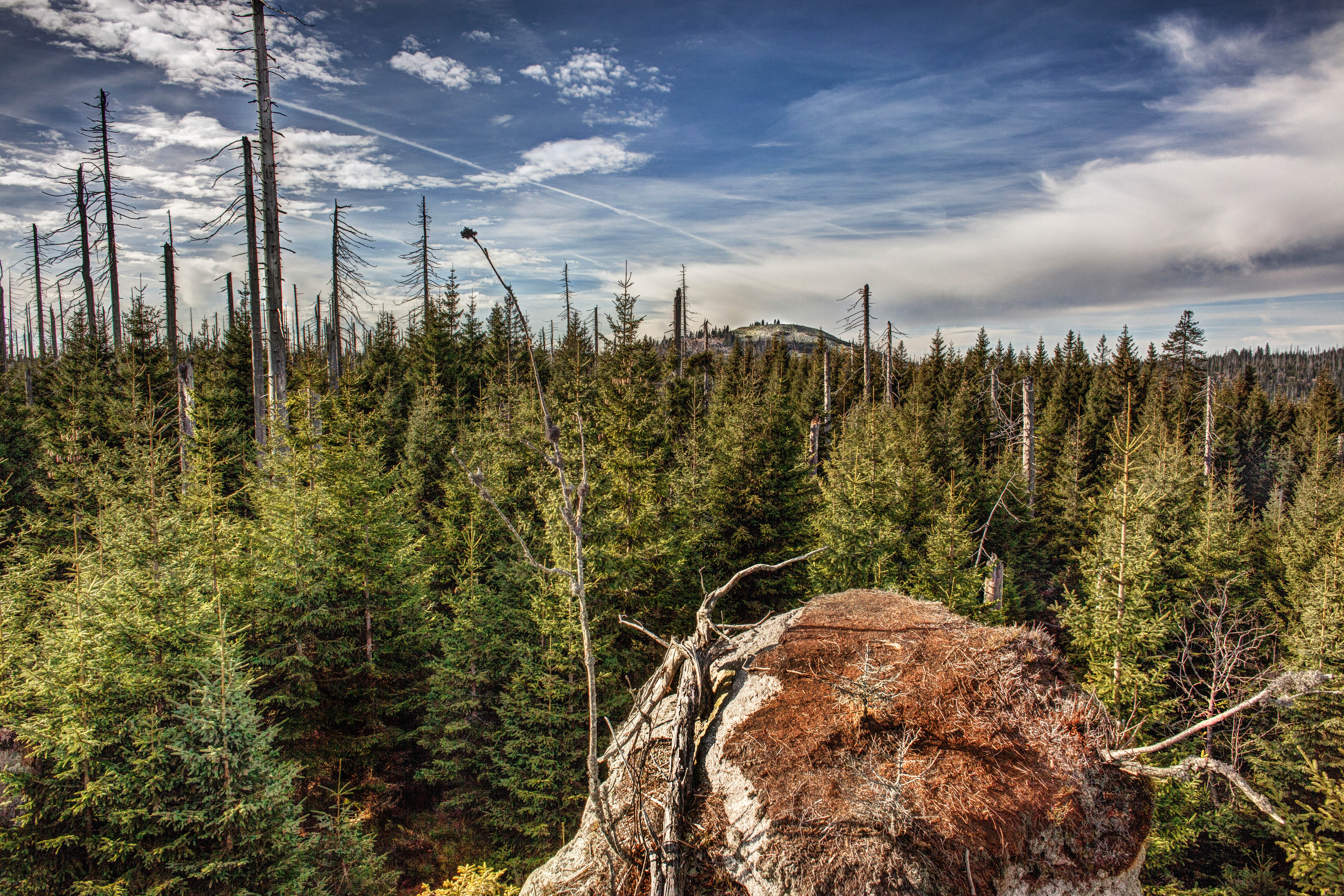

Highest point
- Elevation: 1,279 m (4,196 ft)
- Coordinates: 48°56′11″N 13°31′17″E

Geography
- Location: Bavaria, Germany
- Country: Germany
- States: Bavaria
- Parent range: Watzmann; Hochkalter; Hoher Göll

Geology
- Mountain type(s): Mountain – an elevation standing high above the surrounding area with small summit area, steep slopes and local relief of 300 m or more

Hoher Filzberg is a mountain of Bavaria, Germany.

Hoher Filzberg is a prominent mountain located in the Bavarian Alps, specifically in the Berchtesgaden Alps range of Bavaria, Germany. With an elevation of 1,279 meters (4,196 feet) above sea level, it offers stunning panoramic views of the surrounding alpine landscapes.
