= Hessenstein =

Mountain in Germany

Coordinates: 48°54′53″N 13°18′15″E

Highest point
- Elevation: 878 m (2,881 ft)

Geography
- Location: Bavaria, Germany

Hessenstein is a mountain of Bavaria, Germany. The nearest town is Klingenbrunn, Germany.

A wooden summit cross stands atop the rocky peak, accessible only by a short climb. The view extends south and west towards the ridge of the Vorderer Bayerischer Wald (Front Bavarian Forest). Several short hiking trails lead up to the Hessenstein from the surrounding villages.

The Hessenstein is designated as a geotope (272R026) by the Bavarian State Office for the Environment. The summit area of the Hessenstein consists of coarse-grained gneiss, forming an imposing summit cliff with advanced spheroidal weathering . The coarse-grained gneiss contains garnet.
