= Rollmannsberg =

Mountain in Germany

Coordinates: 48°47′45″N 13°48′03″E

Highest point
- Elevation: 1,042 m (3,419 ft)

Geography
- Location: Bavaria, Germany

Rollmannsberg is a mountain of Bavaria, Germany.
