= Schwarzkopf (Bavarian Forest) =

Mountain in Germany

Coordinates: 48°51′23″N 13°39′19″E

Highest point
- Elevation: 1,060 m (3,480 ft)

Geography
- Location: Bavaria, Germany

Schwarzkopf is a mountain of Bavaria, Germany.
