= Siebensteinkopf =

Mountain in Bavaria, Germany

Coordinates: 48°57′53″N 13°34′31″E

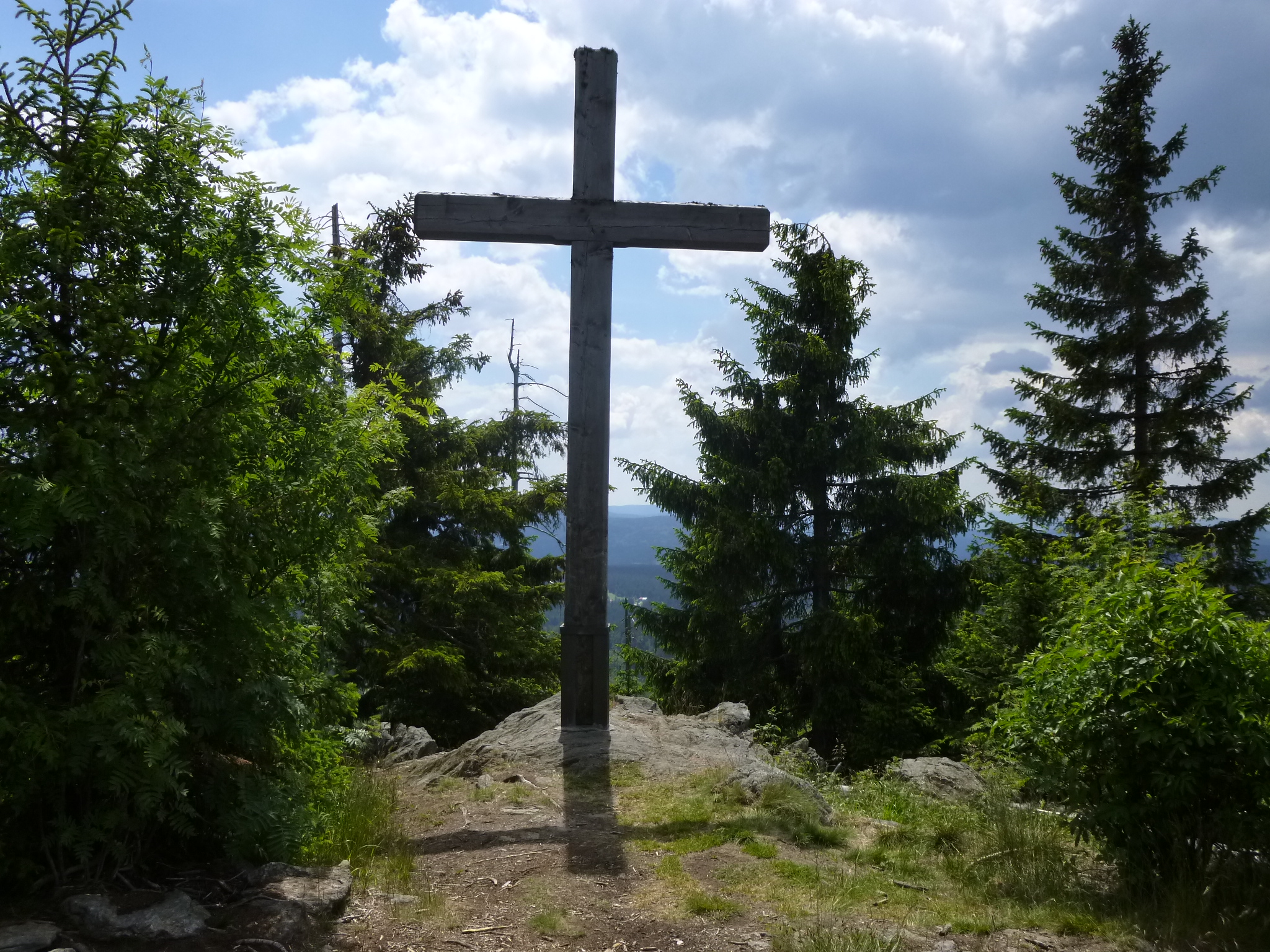
- Summit cross on the Siebensteinkopf

Highest point
- Elevation: 1,263 m (4,144 ft)

Geography
- Location: Bavaria, Germany

Siebensteinkopf is a mountain in Bavaria, Germany.
