= Scheuereckberg =

Mountain in Germany

Coordinates: 49°04′03″N 13°19′52″E

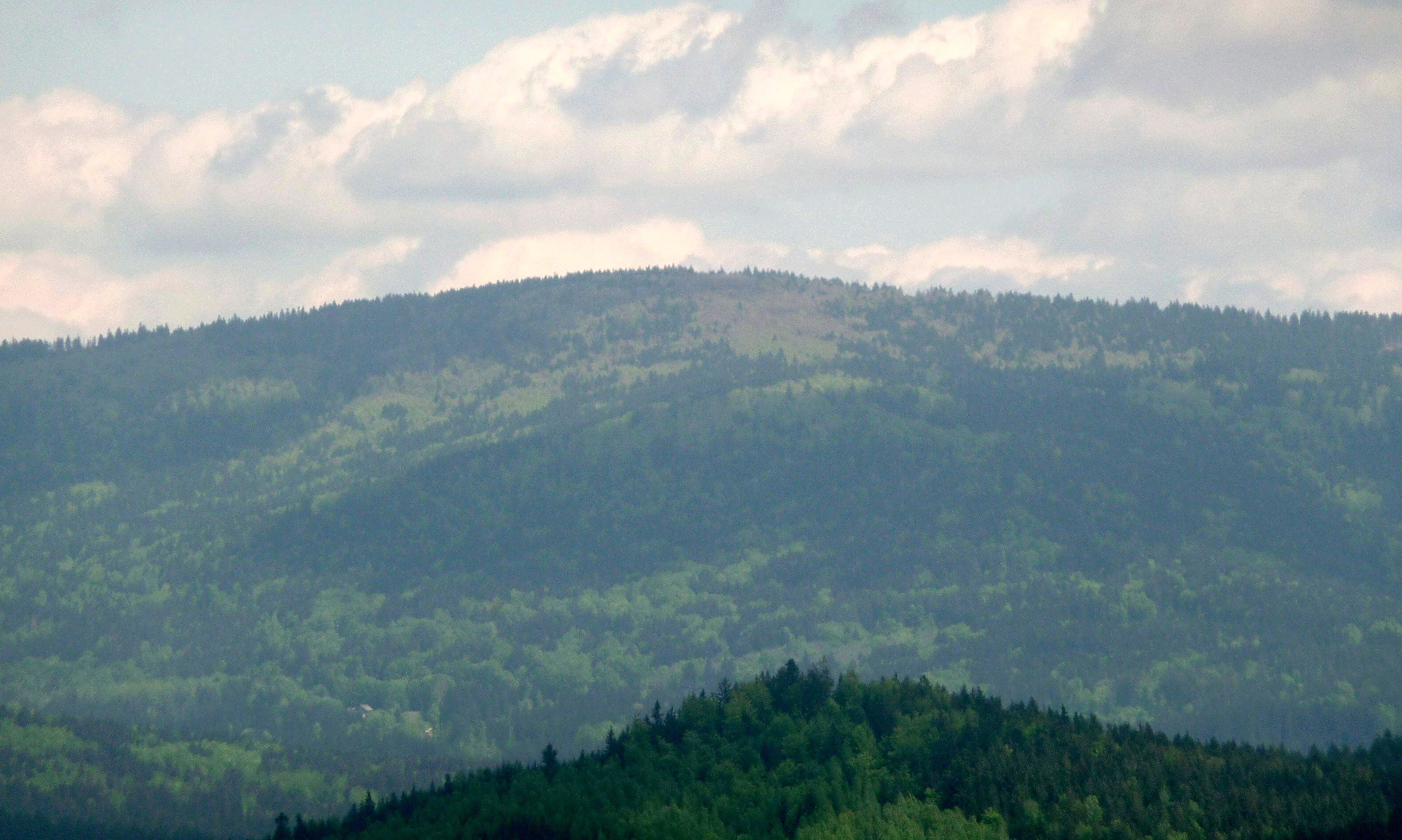
- The Scheuereckberg from Rabenstein.

Highest point
- Elevation: 1,193 m (3,914 ft)

Geography
- Location: Bavaria, Germany

Scheuereckberg is a mountain of Bavaria, Germany.
