= Kiesruck =

Mountain in Germany

Coordinates: 49°03′N 13°21′E

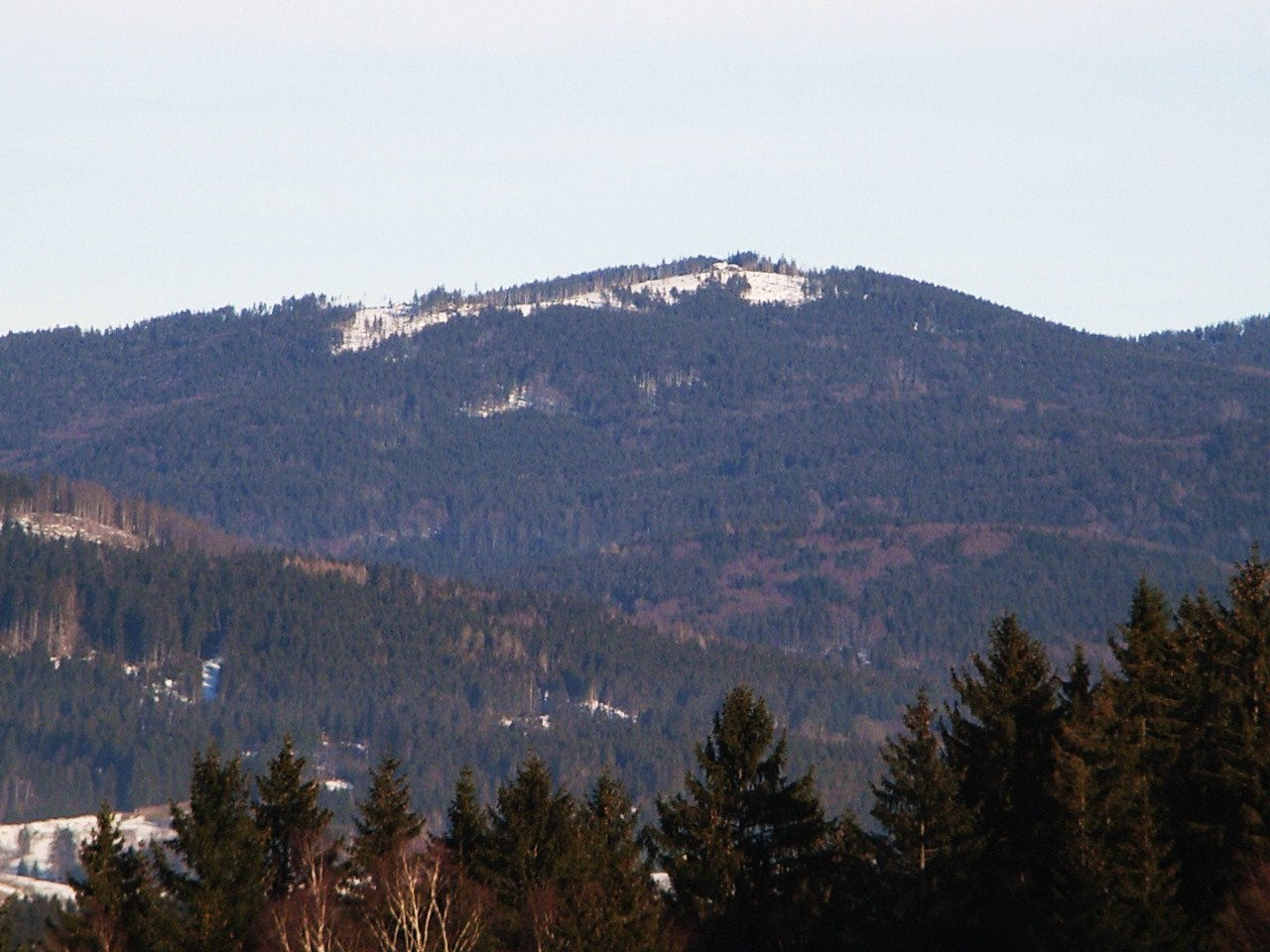

Highest point
- Elevation: 1,265 m (4,150 ft)

Geography
- Location: Bavaria, Germany

Kiesruck is a Mountain in Bavaria, Germany, lying between Falkenstein and Rachel mountains. Access to the mountain is prohibited from mid-November to mid-July, in an effort to protect threatened species which reside in the area; and as such, no marked hiking trail to its summit exists.
