= Hirschberg (Lower Bavaria) =

Mountain in Germany

Coordinates: 49°01′17″N 13°21′08″E

Hirschberg (Niederbayern)

Highest point
- Elevation: 1,039 m (3,409 ft)

Geography
- Location: Bavaria, Germany

Hirschberg (Niederbayern) is a mountain of Bavaria, Germany. It is located in the district government of Lower Bavaria and the federal state of Bavaria , in the southeastern part of the country, 400 km south of the state capital Berlin.

Hirschberg is 1,039 meters above sea level, or 37 meters above the surrounding terrain. It is about 0.56 km wide at its base.
