= Zwiesel Forest Museum =

Museum in Germany

Coordinates: 49°00′51″N 13°13′52″E

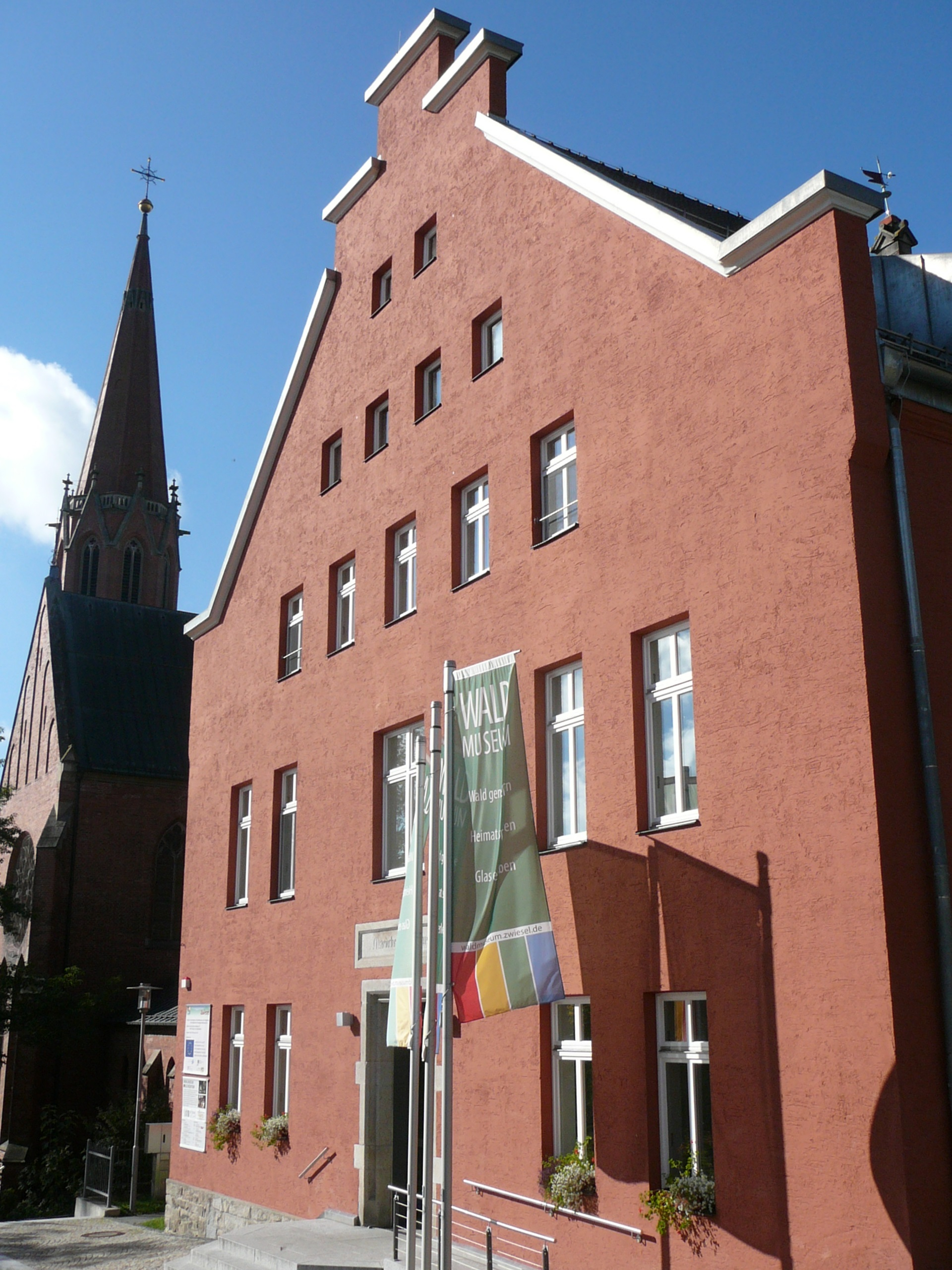
The forest museum in Zwiesel

The Zwiesel Forest Museum (German: Waldmuseum Zwiesel) in the town of Zwiesel on Kirchplatz 3 is a cultural and natural history museum in the Lower Bavarian county of Regen. It is housed in a building formerly part of a girls' school run by an English sister. The exhibition is elaborated in German and Czech. The building also serves as the cultural centre for the town of Zwiesel.

== General ==
In the late 19th century a wave of museums were founded in Bavaria, which also affected Zwiesel. From 1904, documents and artefacts from the history of Zwiesel were collected and, one year later, a municipal museum was established, which was housed on the upper floor of the local mortuary. The collection grew steadily and the existing premises became too small. In 1924, the museum found a new home in the former community brewery and later in the fire brigade equipment house on the town square.

In the 1960s, its thematic focus changed. Oberforstrat Konrad Klotz (1905-1994), head of the Zwiesel forestry office, and Georg Priehäußer (1894-1974) worked towards a new concept for the museum. In 1966 they succeeded in establishing the first German forest museum in Zwiesel. The flora and fauna of the forest, as well as the subject of "wood", became the central features. These areas were supplemented by municipal and regional history as well as by the theme of "glass" for Zwiesel, which was indispensable given the centrality of glassmaking in the town.

Unusual exhibits such as the trunk details of a 400-year-old fir tree or a jungle diorama were integrated into the concept.

In 2014, the contents and design of the Forest Museum were revised once again and moved to the former girls' school on Kirchplatz, which is located right next to the neo-Gothic church of St. Nicholas.

== Literature ==
- Waldmuseum Zwiesel, Ein Führer durch das Museum, Herausgeber Waldmuseum der Stadt Zwiesel
