= Kronberg (Lower Bavaria) =

Mountain in Germany

Kronberg (Niederbayern)
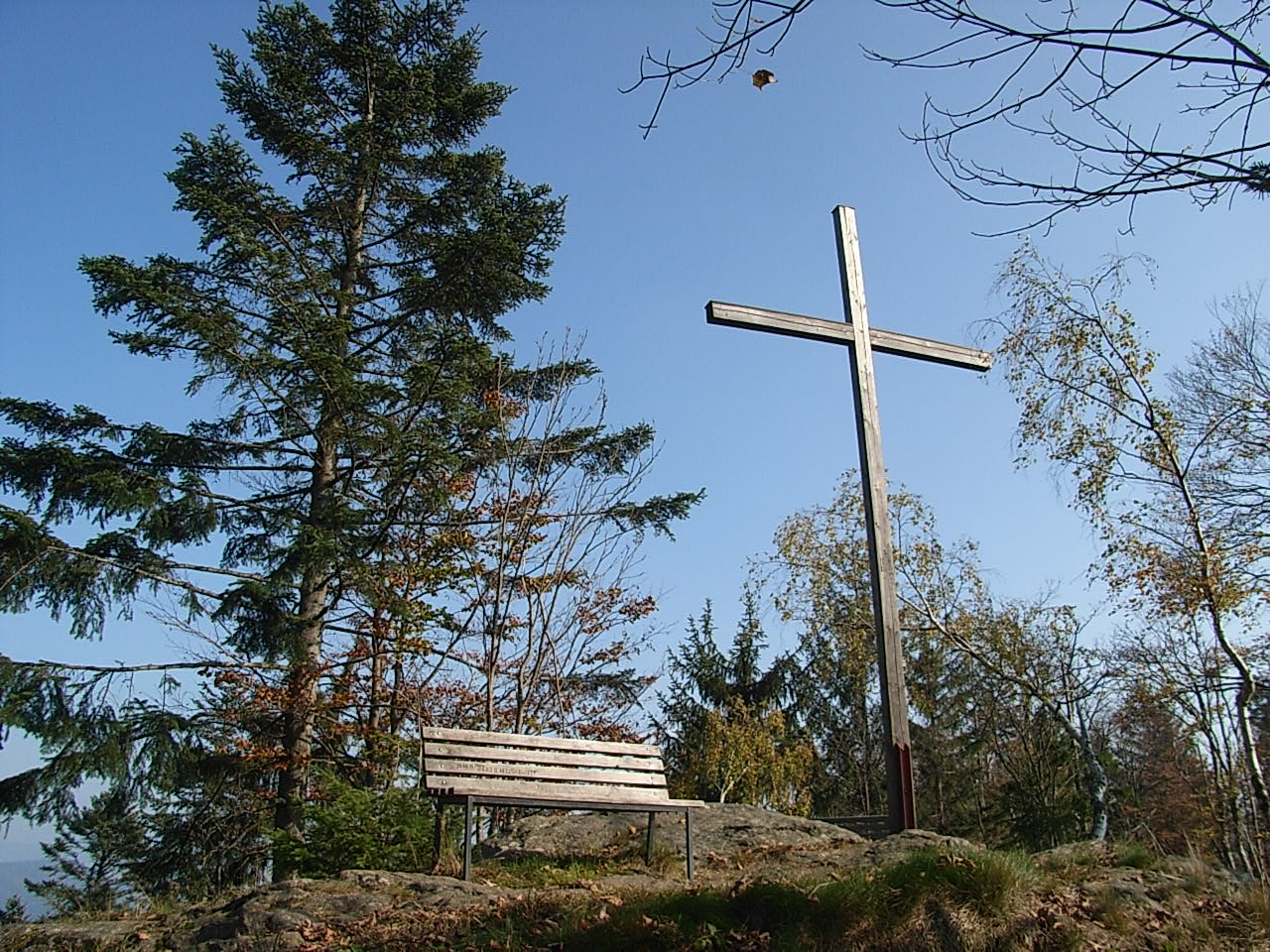
- Summit of the Kronberg, with (left) Abies alba

Highest point
- Elevation: 983 m (3,225 ft)
- Coordinates: 49°2′13″N 13°6′19″E

Geography
- Location within Bavaria
- Location: Bavaria, Germany
- Parent range: Bayerischer Wald

Kronberg (Niederbayern) is a mountain of Bavaria, Germany.
