= Hochzellberg =

Mountain in Germany

Coordinates: 49°04′40″N 13°08′02″E

Highest point
- Elevation: 1,208 m (3,963 ft)

Geography
- Location: Bavaria, Germany

Hochzellberg is a mountain of Bavaria, Germany. Various activities can be done there, such as mountaineering, hiking or backcountry skiing.
