= Hindenburgkanzel =

Mountain in Germany

Coordinates: 49°08′50″N 13°09′26″E

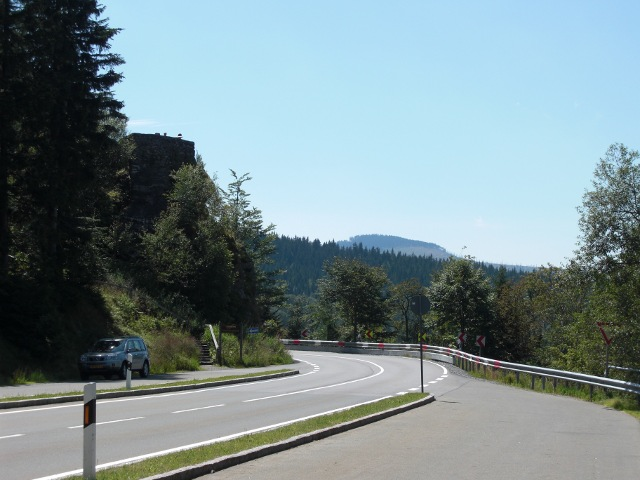
- View Hindenburgkanzel as seen from the road at the base

Highest point
- Elevation: 1,062 m (3,484 ft)

Geography
- Location: Bavaria, Germany

' Hindenburgkanzel' is a mountain of Bavaria, Germany.
