= Steinfleckberg =

Mountain in Germany

Coordinates: 48°57′10″N 13°31′21″E

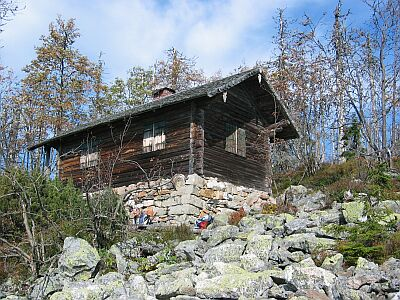
- The hut on Steinfleckberg.

Highest point
- Elevation: 1,341 m (4,400 ft)

Geography
- Location: Bavaria, Germany

Steinfleckberg is a mountain of Bavaria, Germany.
