= Rauher Kulm (Lower Bavaria) =

Mountain in Germany

Coordinates: 48°56′53″N 12°53′56″E

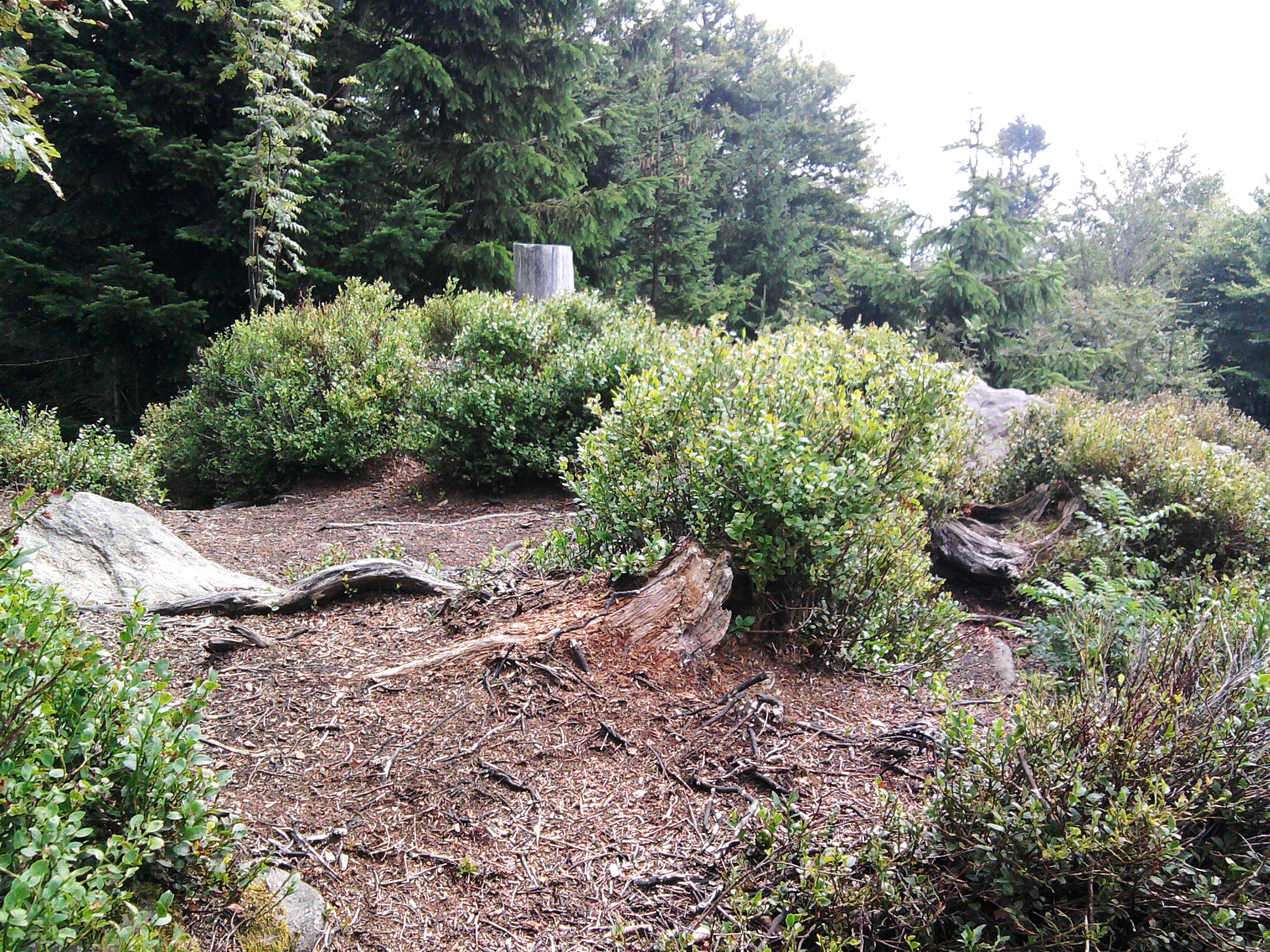

Highest point
- Elevation: 1,050 m (3,440 ft)

Geography
- Location: Bavaria, Germany

Rauher Kulm is a mountain of Bavaria, Germany.
