= Käsplatte =

Mountain in Germany

Coordinates: 49°02′N 12°48′E

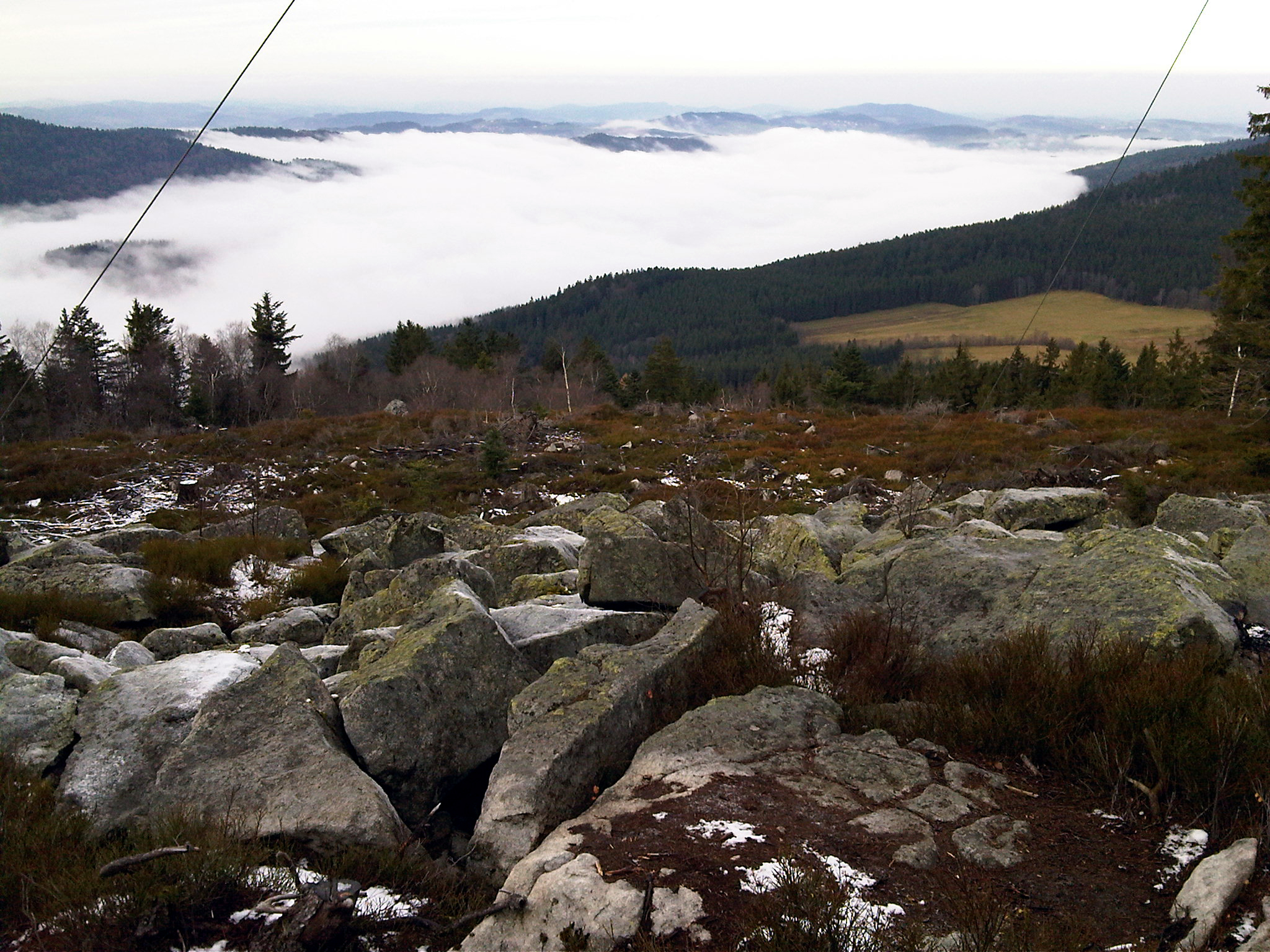
- View of Käsplatte Mountain.

Highest point
- Elevation: 978 m (3,209 ft)

Geography
- Location: Bavaria, Germany

Käsplatte is a mountain of Bavaria, Germany.
