= Kanzel (Bavarian Forest) =

Mountain in Germany

Coordinates: 48°53′15″N 13°31′55″E

Kanzel (Bayerischer Wald)
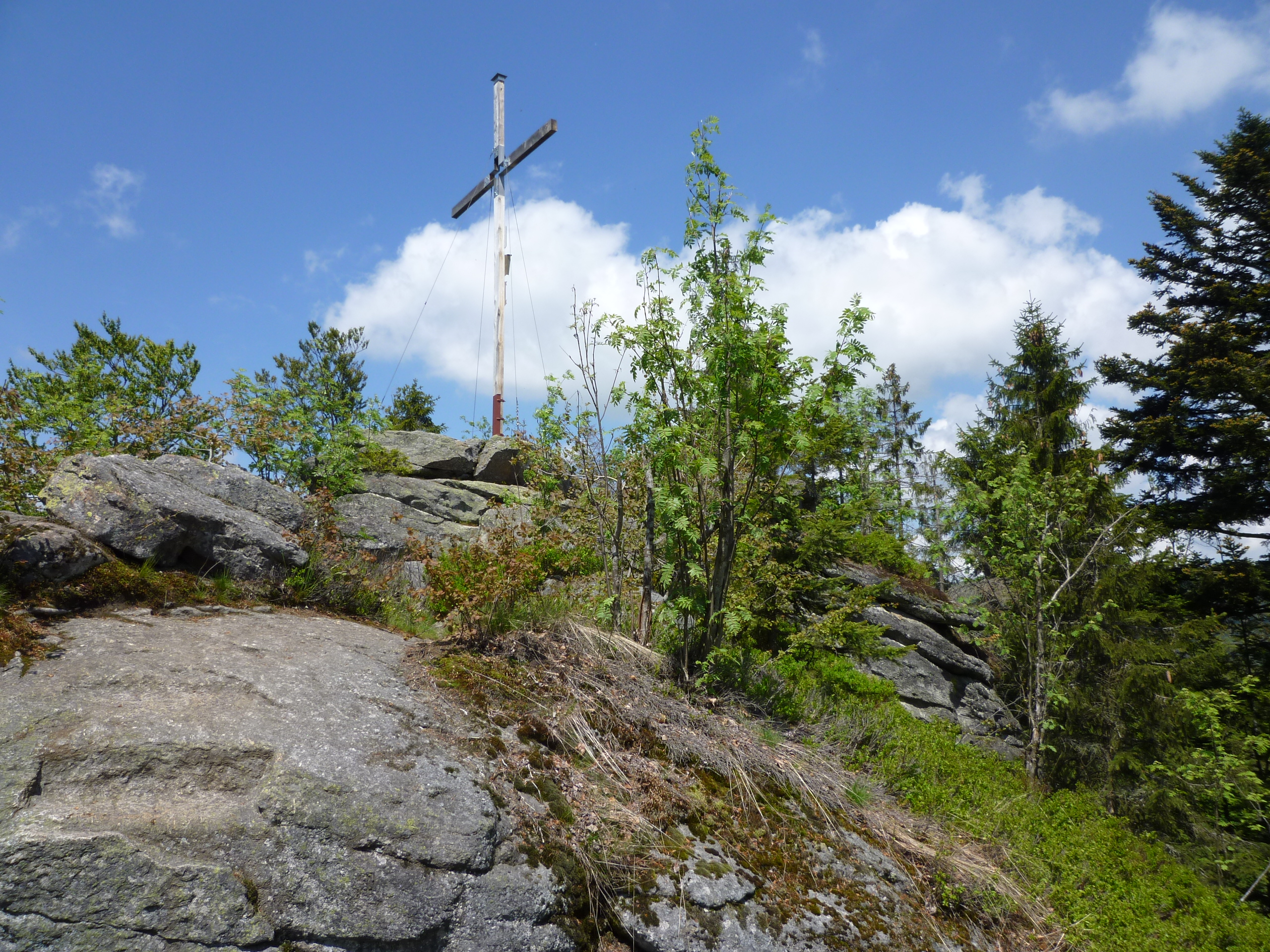
- Cross at the summit of Kanzel

Highest point
- Elevation: 1,011 m (3,317 ft)

Geography
- Location: Bavaria, Germany

Kanzel (Bayerischer Wald) is a mountain of Bavaria, Germany.
