= Weigelsberg =

Mountain in Germany

Coordinates: 49°06′N 12°58′E

Highest point
- Elevation: 898 m (2,946 ft)

Geography
- Location: Bavaria, Germany

Weigelsberg is a mountain of Bavaria, Germany.
