= Pröller =

Mountain in Germany

Coordinates: 49°01′23″N 12°49′14″E

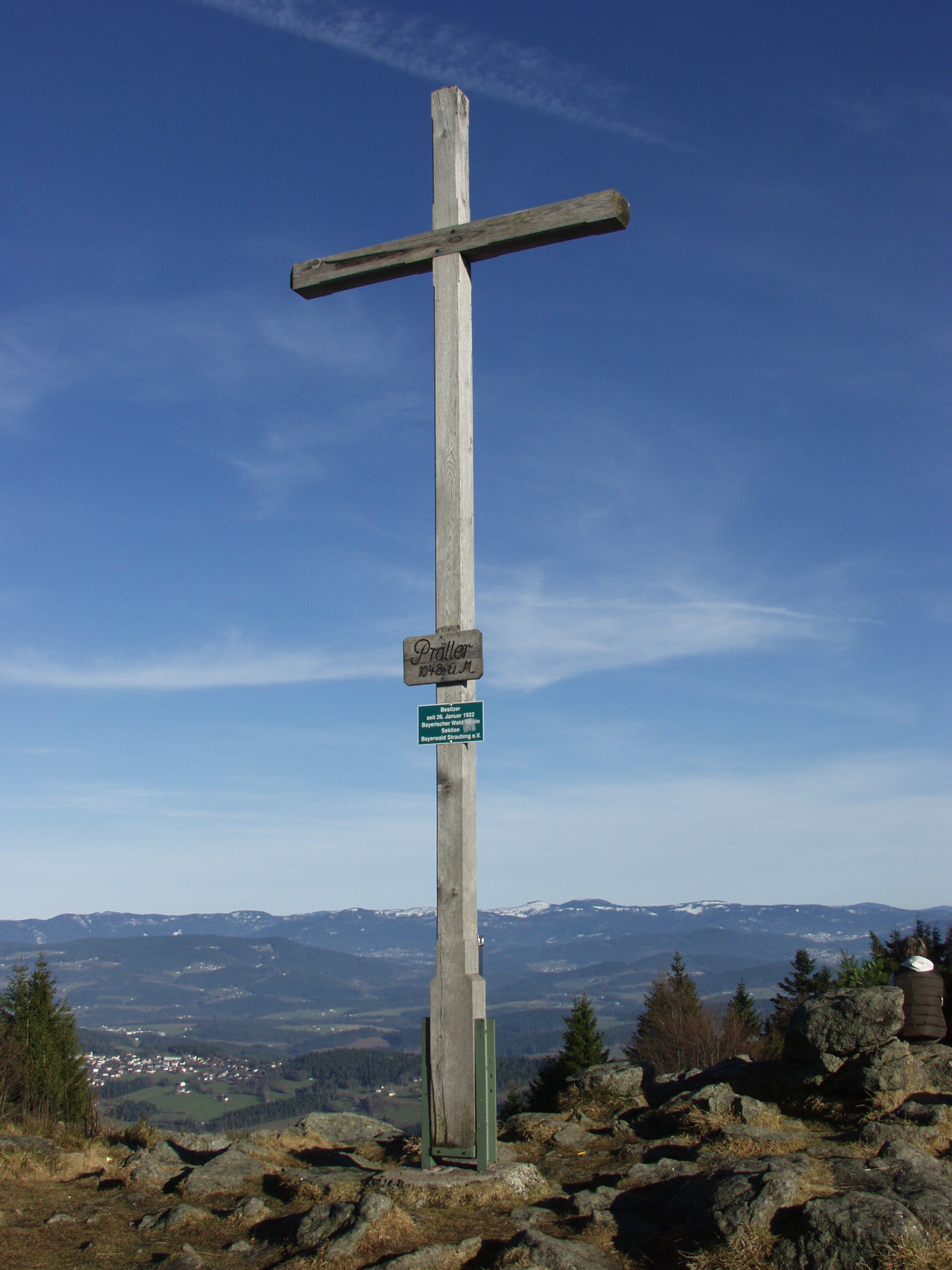
- Summit cross on the Pröller

Highest point
- Elevation: 1,048 m (3,438 ft)

Geography
- Location: Bavaria, Germany

Pröller is a mountain of Bavaria, Germany.
