= Steinberg (Lower Bavaria) =

Mountain in Germany

Coordinates: 48°40′56″N 13°35′15″E

Highest point
- Elevation: 830 m (2,720 ft)

Geography
- Location: Bavaria, Germany

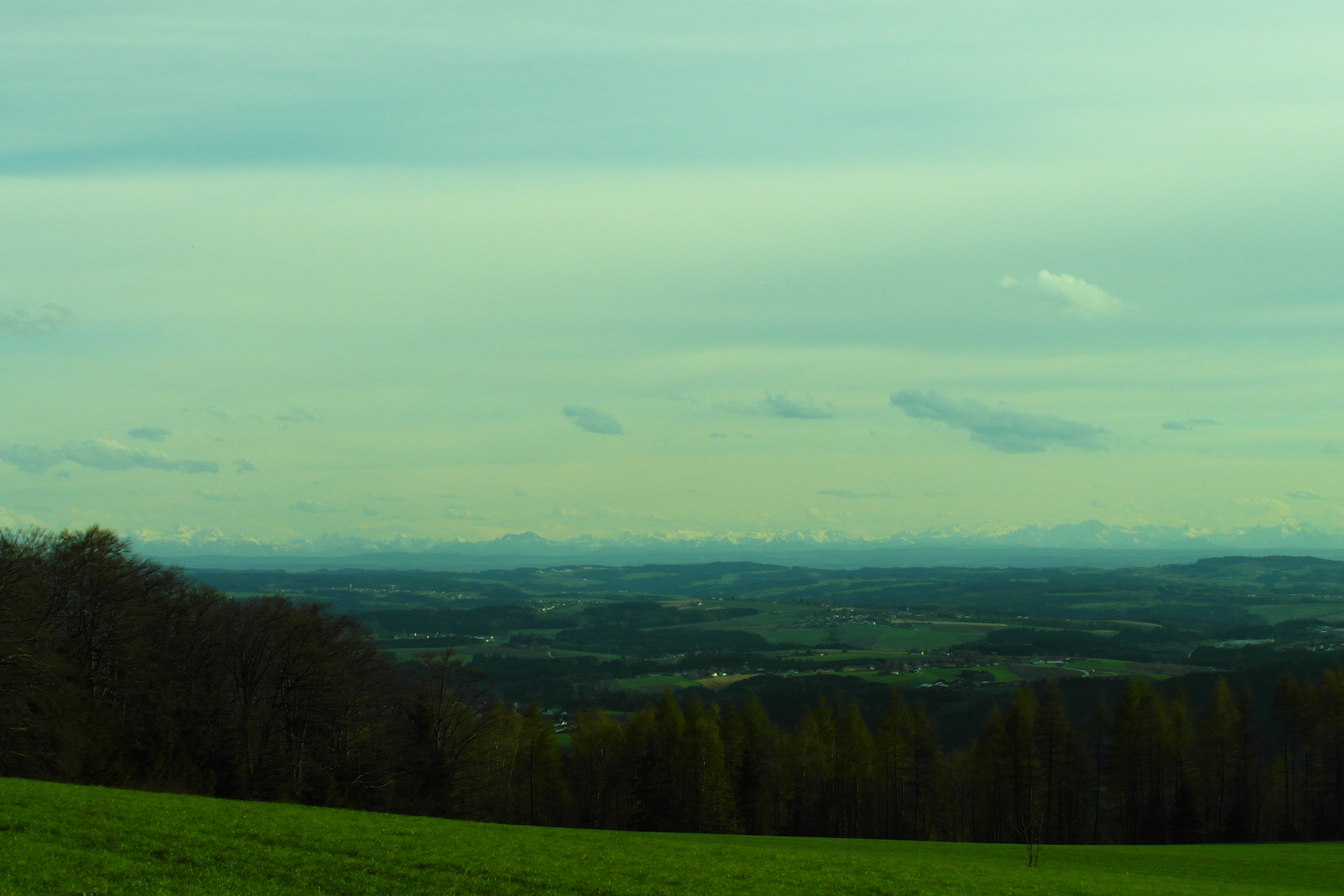
View of the Alpine chain of Steinberg from Totes Gebirge to Kaisergebirge

Steinberg (German pronunciation: [ˈʃtaɪ̯nˌbɛʁk]) is a mountain of Bavaria, Germany.
