= Hahnenbogen =

Mountain in Germany

Coordinates: 49°02′46″N 13°21′57″E

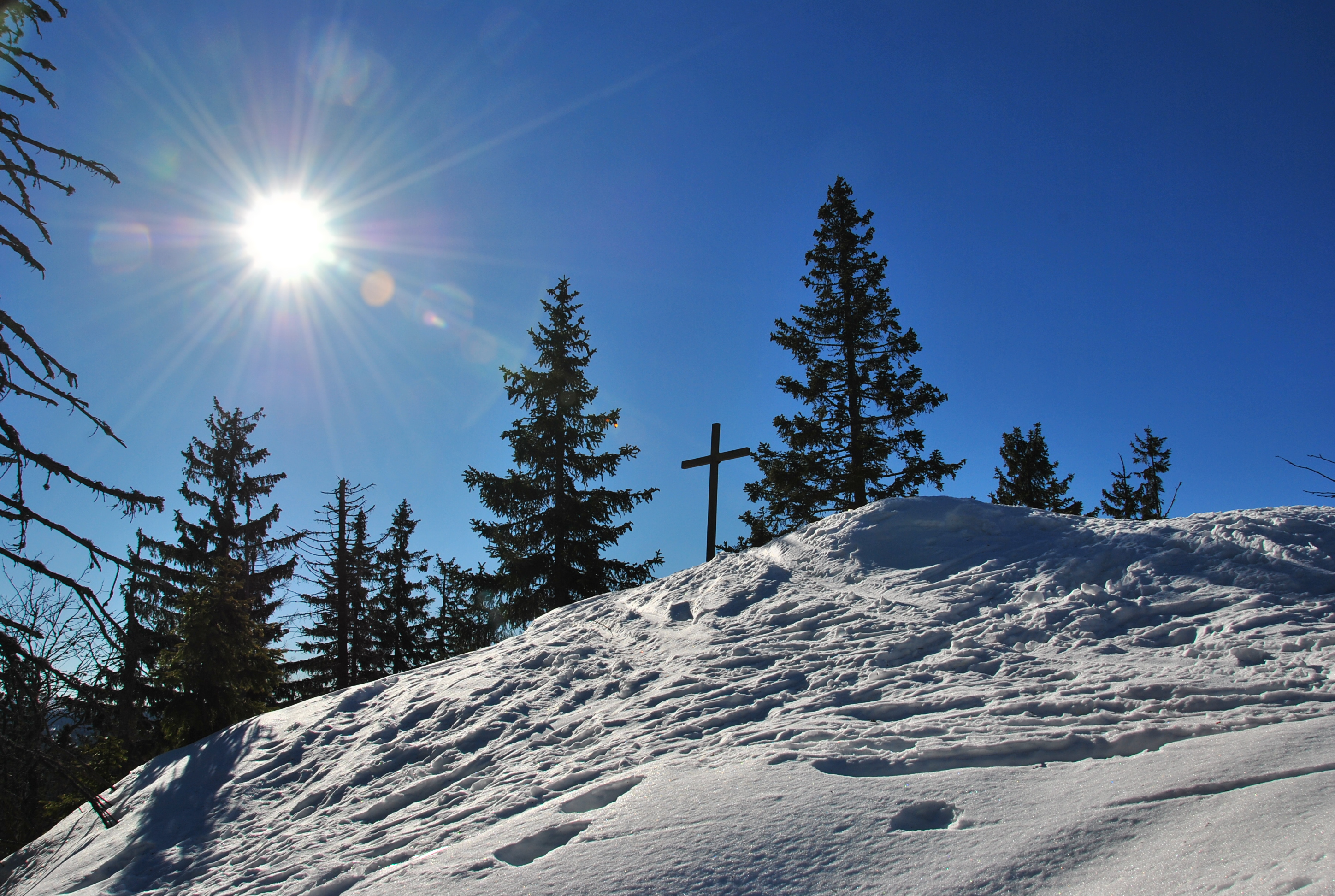
- Summit of Hahnenbogen in the Bavarian Forest

Highest point
- Elevation: 1,257 m (4,124 ft)

Geography
- Location: Bavaria, Germany

Hahnenbogen is a mountain of Bavaria, Germany.
