= Hochberg (Lower Bavaria) =

Mountain in Germany

Coordinates: 49°06′27″N 13°12′26″E

Hochberg (Niederbayern)

Highest point
- Elevation: 943 m (3,094 ft)

Geography
- Location: Bavaria, Germany

Hochberg (Niederbayern) is a mountain of Bavaria, Germany.
