= Knogl =

Mountain in Germany

Coordinates: 48°59′45″N 12°51′30″E

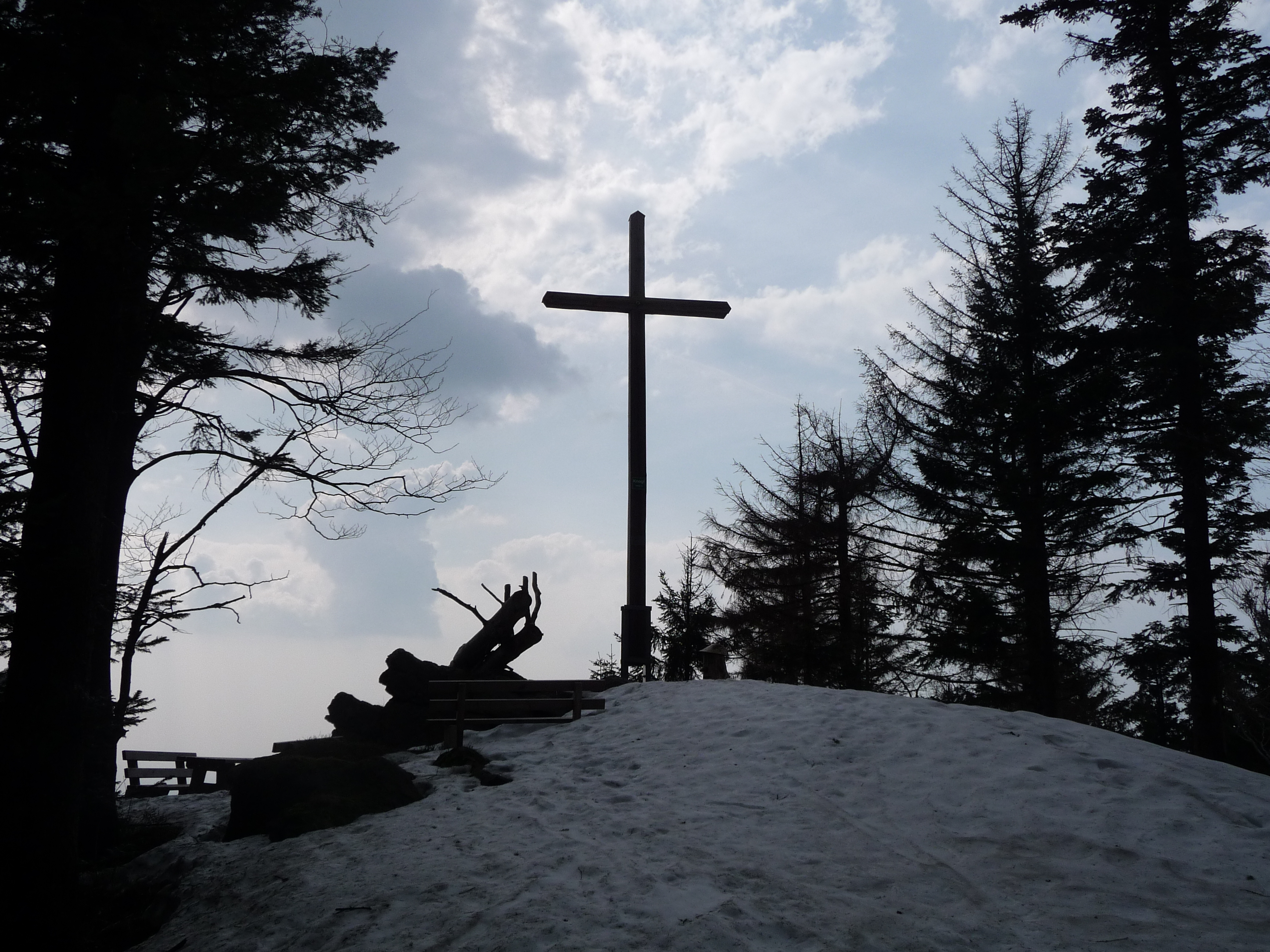
- Knogl summit

Highest point
- Elevation: 1,056 m (3,465 ft)

Geography
- Location: Bavaria, Germany

Knogl is a mountain of Bavaria, Germany.
