= Hochstein (surname) =

Hochstein is a surname. Notable people with the surname include:

- Amos Hochstein (born 1973), American-Israeli politician
- Barbara Hochstein, German–New Zealand radiologist
- David Hochstein (1892–1918), American classical violinist
- Erik Hochstein (born 1968), German swimmer
- Grant Hochstein (born 1990), American figure skater
- Russ Hochstein (born 1977), American football player
