= Hohlstein =

Mountain in Germany

Coordinates: 48°54′55″N 13°31′48″E

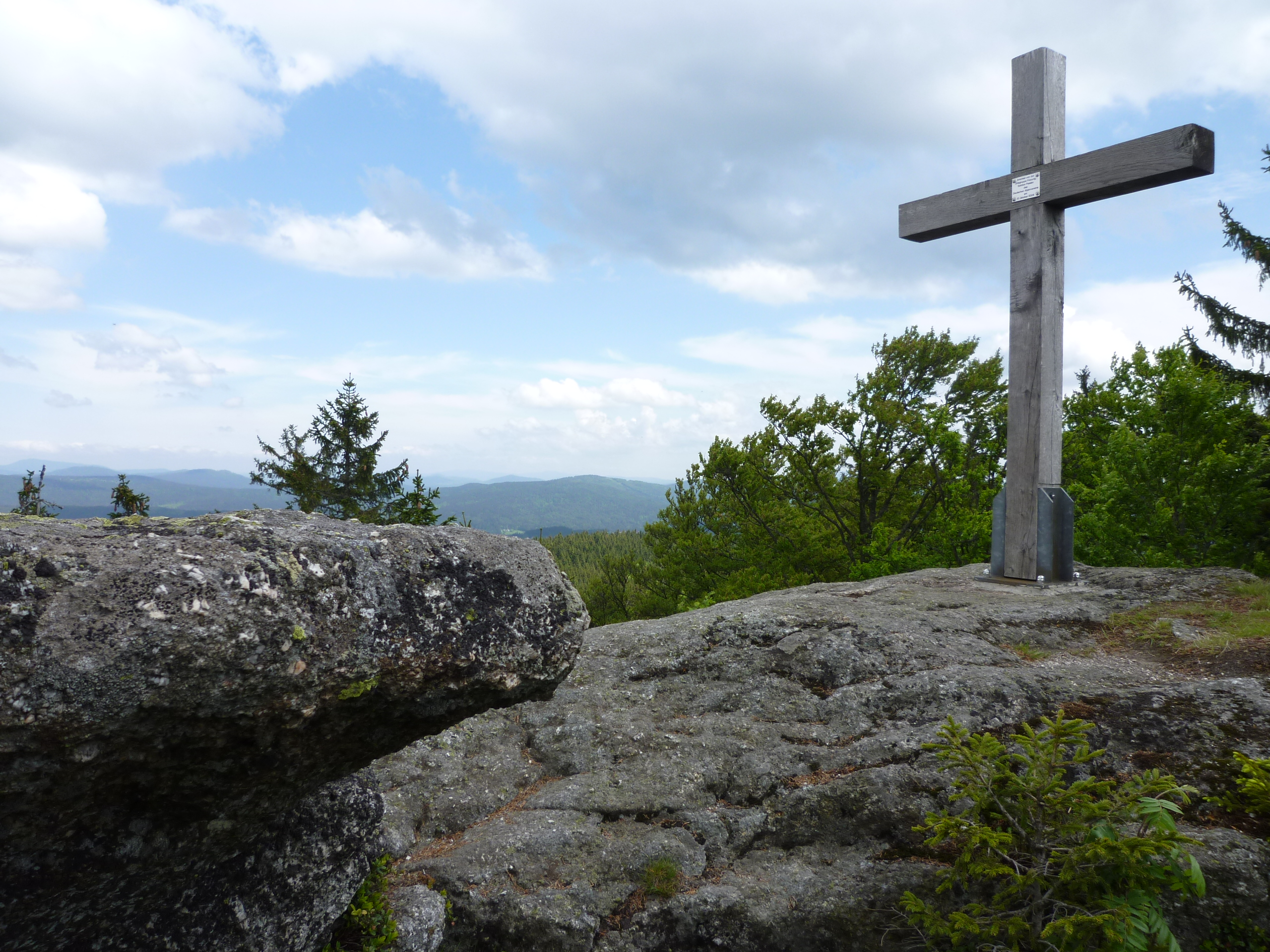
- Hohlstein

Highest point
- Elevation: 1,196 m (3,924 ft)

Geography
- Location: Bavaria, Germany

Hohlstein is a mountain of Bavaria, Germany.
