= Staffelberg (Lower Bavaria) =

Mountain in Germany

Coordinates: 48°39′04″N 13°39′05″E

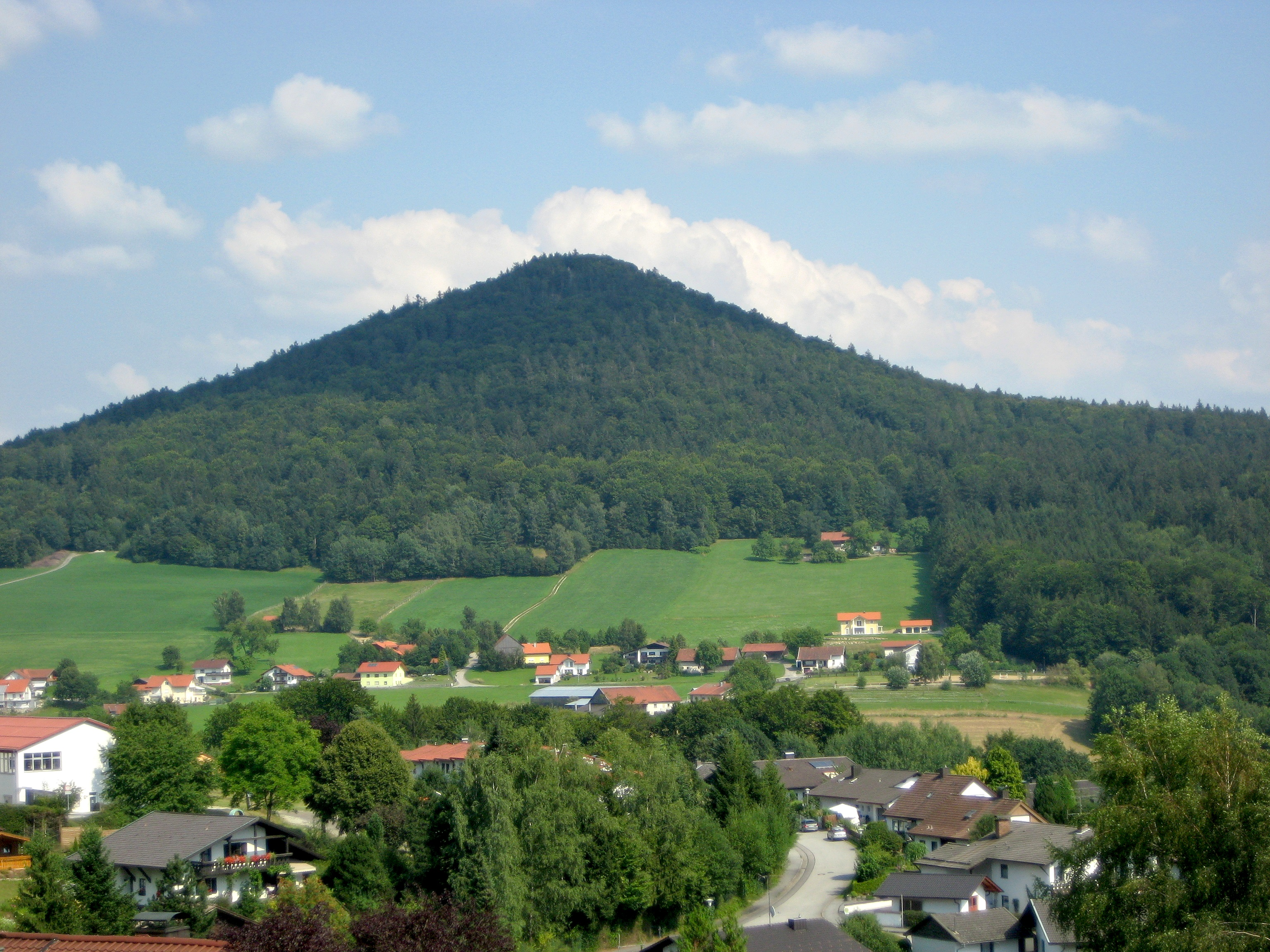

Highest point
- Elevation: 793 m (2,602 ft)

Geography
- Location: Bavaria, Germany

The Staffelberg is a mountain in Lower Bavaria, Germany.
