= Hochstein (Arnbruck) =

Mountain in Germany

Coordinates: 49°07′25″N 13°03′51″E

Highest point
- Elevation: 1,134 m (3,720 ft)

Geography
- Location: Bavaria, Germany

Hochstein (Arnbruck) is a mountain of Bavaria, Germany.
