= Almberg =

Mountain in Germany

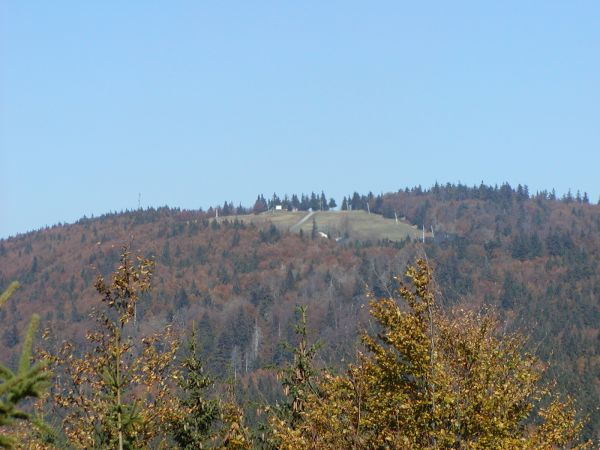
- The Almberg seen from the Grandelberg

Highest point
- Elevation: 1,139 m (3,737 ft)
- Coordinates: 48°53′23″N 13°38′38″E

Geography
- Location within Bavaria
- Location: Hinterschmiding
- Parent range: Bavarian Forest

Geology
- Rock type: granite

Almberg is a mountain in the Bavarian Forest range in Germany. It is 1,139 m (3,737 ft) high and lies in the municipality of Hinterschmiding, near the border between Germany and the Czech Republic.

== Skiing ==
Its mountainsides are mainly used for skiing. On its eastern side is Mitterfirmiansreut, a village whose main focus is winter sports with five ski lifts, a chair lift and an extensive Nordic skiing network. The Almberg star party takes place annually there.

In 2010, on the approach to the village of Alpe, an artificial lake was built with a storage volume of about 28,000 cubic metres, which is used to feed the ski cannon in the ski centre.

== View ==
The summit plateau offers an all-round view over the Bavarian Forest National Park including Rachel and Lusen. On clear autumn days when there is a föhn wind, the Northern Limestone Alps are visible from the Totes Gebirge to the Zugspitze.
