= Kleiner Rachel =

Mountain in Germany

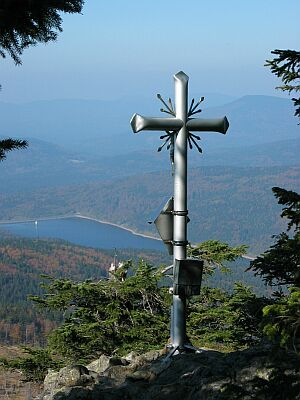
- Summit cross on the Kleiner Rachel with a view of the Frauenau Dam

Highest point
- Elevation: 1,399 m (4,590 ft)
- Prominence: 650 m (2,130 ft)
- Coordinates: 48°59′1″N 13°22′45″E

Geography
- Location: Frauenau, Bavaria, Germany
- Parent range: Bavarian Forest

Geology
- Rock type: Gneiss

The Kleiner Rachel (lit. 'little Rachel') is a mountain in the Bavarian Forest range in Bavaria, Germany. It is located in the Bavarian Forest National Park, about 1.8 km (1.1 mi) west of the Czech–German border. It has an altitude of 1,399 m (4,590 ft) above sea level, making it the third highest mountain of the Bavarian Forest.

It lies about 900 m northwest of the Großer Rachel (1,453 m) but is far less frequently climbed. A summit cross stands with a summit register on the rocks just below the highest point. From the cross, there are views of the town of Zwiesel, the Großer Arber, the Großer Falkenstein, and the Frauenau Dam.

The Kleiner Rachel is only accessible on foot. There are hiking trails from the Oberfrauenau, the Klingenbrunn railway station, and the Großer Rachel. However, the path to the summit cross is unmarked and requires pathfinding. Furthermore, it is subject to trail use regulations (Wegegebot) as an unmarked path and, according to current national park ordinances, may only be accessed between July 15 and November 15.
