= Schachten =

Schachten (singul.) are ancient areas of pasture in the Bavarian Forest in Germany, some of which are still used today.

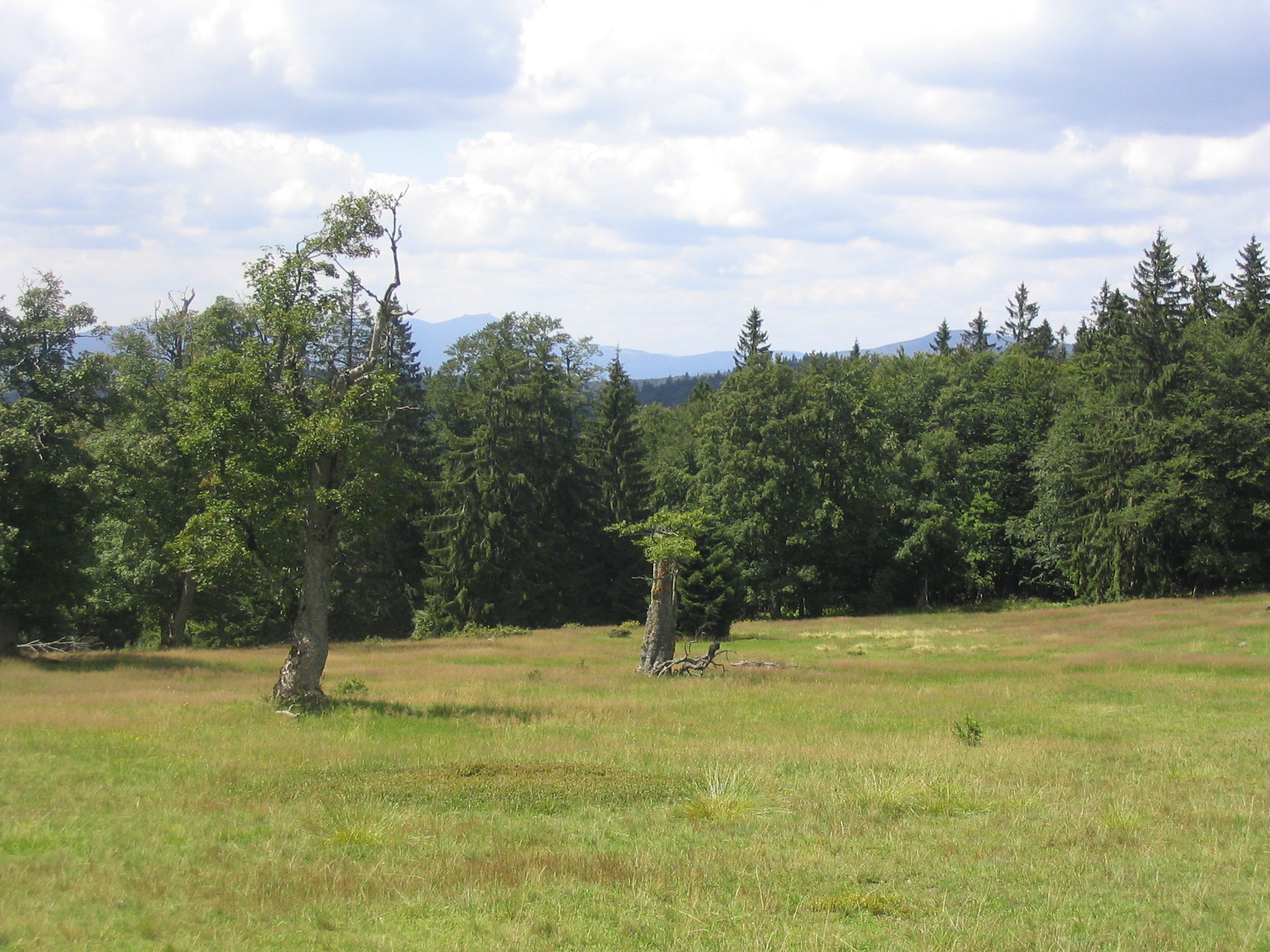
The Ruckowitzschachten at Rukowitzberg. In the background are the mountains of Großer Arber and Zwercheck

== Description ==
Similar to the alms or alpine pastures of the Alps, Schachten are treeless forest meadows. These open areas, often covering several hectares, were used by the herdsmen as places to stay for the night and for halts on a journey. Individual trees were left in place on these meadows to provide shady resting places for the animals. These isolated trees grew, unsheltered and are often gnarled by wind and weather. These forest clearings are especially interesting because they are the only open areas in these huge forests and often have good views. In the north of the Bavarian Forest they are often just called Wiesen ("meadows"), which in the region between the mountains of Großer Falkenstein and Großer Rachel they are exclusively referred to as Schachten; further south and southeast they are called Plätze.

The Schachten flora is less species rich than the alms of the Alps. Rarities include martagon lily, Hungarian gentian, willow gentian, wolf's bane, mountain ragwort and various monkshoods.

== History ==
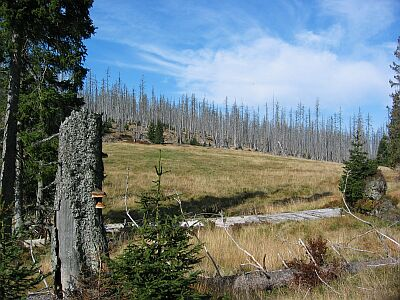
The Kirchlinger Stand at the Steinfleckberg

The term first appeared in 1608 in a report to Duke Maximilian of Bavaria. In 1613 there is a report for the first time of forest clearing grazing on the Rukowitzberg. Until the 1950s, or later in many places, cattle, mainly young bulls, were kept during the summer months (June to September) in the highlands of the Bavarian Forest. There were sometimes legal disputes between different villages over grazing and pannage rights. The herdsmen were permanently employed by the respective village and had a right to live with their families in a local herdsman's house, which they built themselves. Some of them had a legendary reputation, especially Matthias Stormberger, hero of the novel, Mühlhiasl - Der Waldprophet by Paul Friedl, who lived in Rabenstein and was often identified as the forest prophet, Mühlhiasl. Hans Watzlik created a literary monument to another fabled forest herdsman from the Lusen area in his novel Der wilde Eisengrein.

In 1956, when the grazing of cattle in these highland clearings had ended, the Ministry of Forestry decided to reforest the Schachten areas. In the early 1960s, work began on cutting down the old sheltering trees and planting spruce forests. These measures met with considerable resistance, not least from the Bavarian Forest Club. On 17 September 1968, the Regensburg Forestry Division announced that no Schachten had been planted since 1964 and that they would not be afforested in the future. Today these areas will be preserved in order to recall the old way of life in the highlands of the Bavarian Forest.

Some of the Schachten in the Arber area are still grazed. In 1848, there were 139 entitled farmers, in 1948 there were more than a hundred, in 1993 still three. In 2013, in uninterrupted tradition, 21 calves, cows and oxen of the three remaining rights holders, part-time farmers, moved from one Schachten to the next with their herdsman. The six Schachten used for this purpose are now fenced in.

== Literature ==
- Ingeborg Seyfert: Die Schachten des Bayerischen Waldes. Verlag Morsak, Grafenau 1975, ISBN 3-87553-058-6.
- Walther Zeitler, Konrad Jäger, Reinhold Weinberger: Perlen im Waldmeer. Schachten und Hochmoore im Bayerischen Wald. Neue Presse Verlags-GmbH, 2. Auflage, Passau 1995, ISBN 3-924484-65-1.
- Marita Haller: Leitochs’ Peter mag die Höhenluft. In: Der Bayerwald-Bote vom 7. August 2013, S. 21.
