= Lusen (Bavaria) =

Mountain in Germany

- Luzný
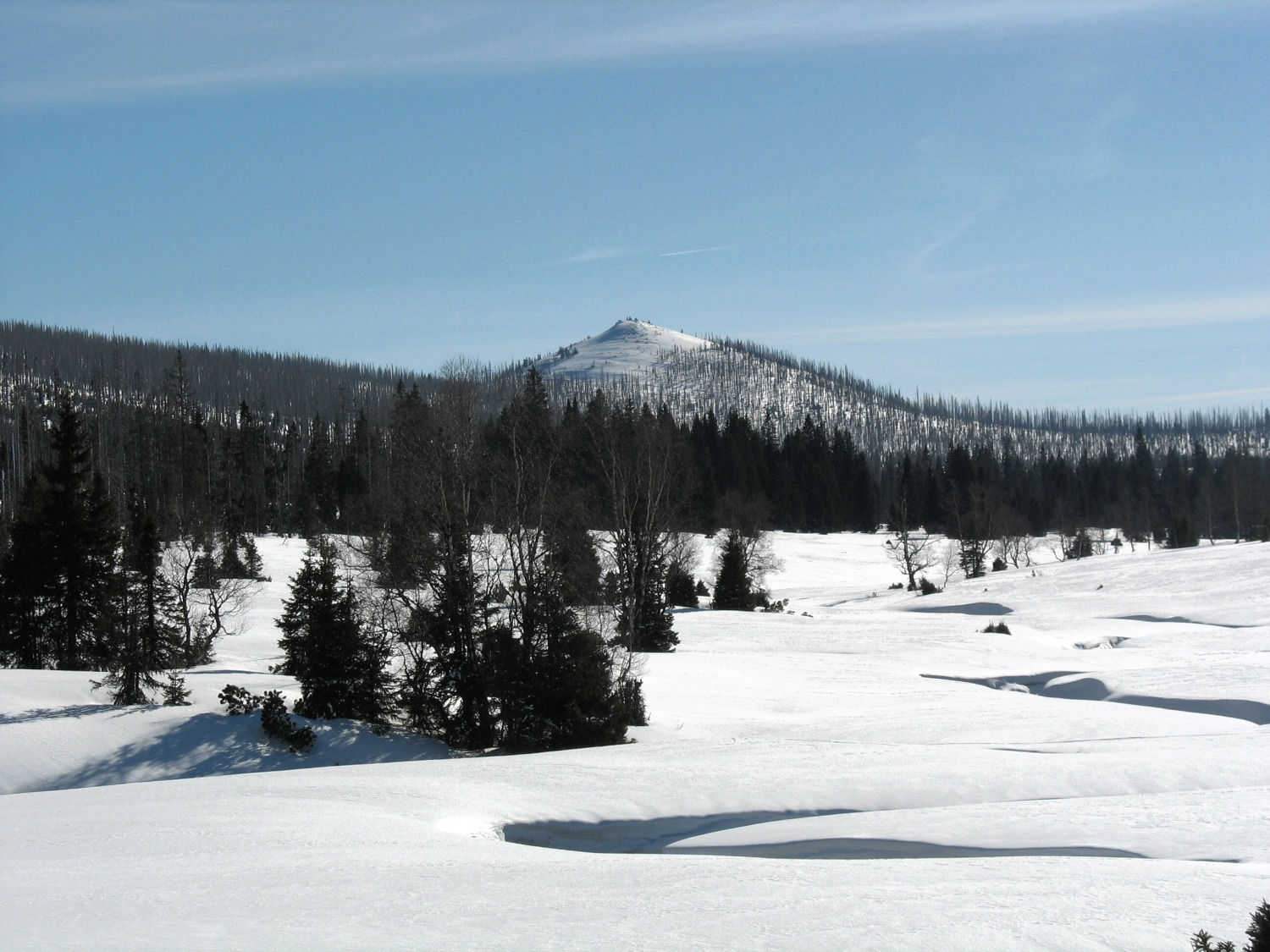
- Lusen seen from Czechia

Highest point
- Elevation: 1,373 m (4,505 ft)
- Coordinates: 48°56′23″N 13°30′25″E

Naming
- Language of name: Lusen: German; Luzný: Czech

Geography
- Location within Bavaria
- Location: Freyung-Grafenau, Bavaria, Germany
- Parent range: Bavarian/Bohemian Forest

Geology
- Rock age: 320 million years
- Mountain type: Granite

Lusen (Czech: Luzný) is a 320 million years old granite mountain located in Bavaria (Germany), being the highest one in the district Freyung-Grafenau with a peak of 1373 metres. It is the sixth-highest mountain in the Bavarian Forest National Park/Bohemian Forest, behind the Großer Rachel, Kleiner Rachel, Kleiner Arber, Plattenhausenriegel and Großer Arber. Its location is south of the Czech Republic–Germany border. The mountain itself is located in the Bavarian Forest National Park and streams forming on the north side become tributaries of the Vydra.

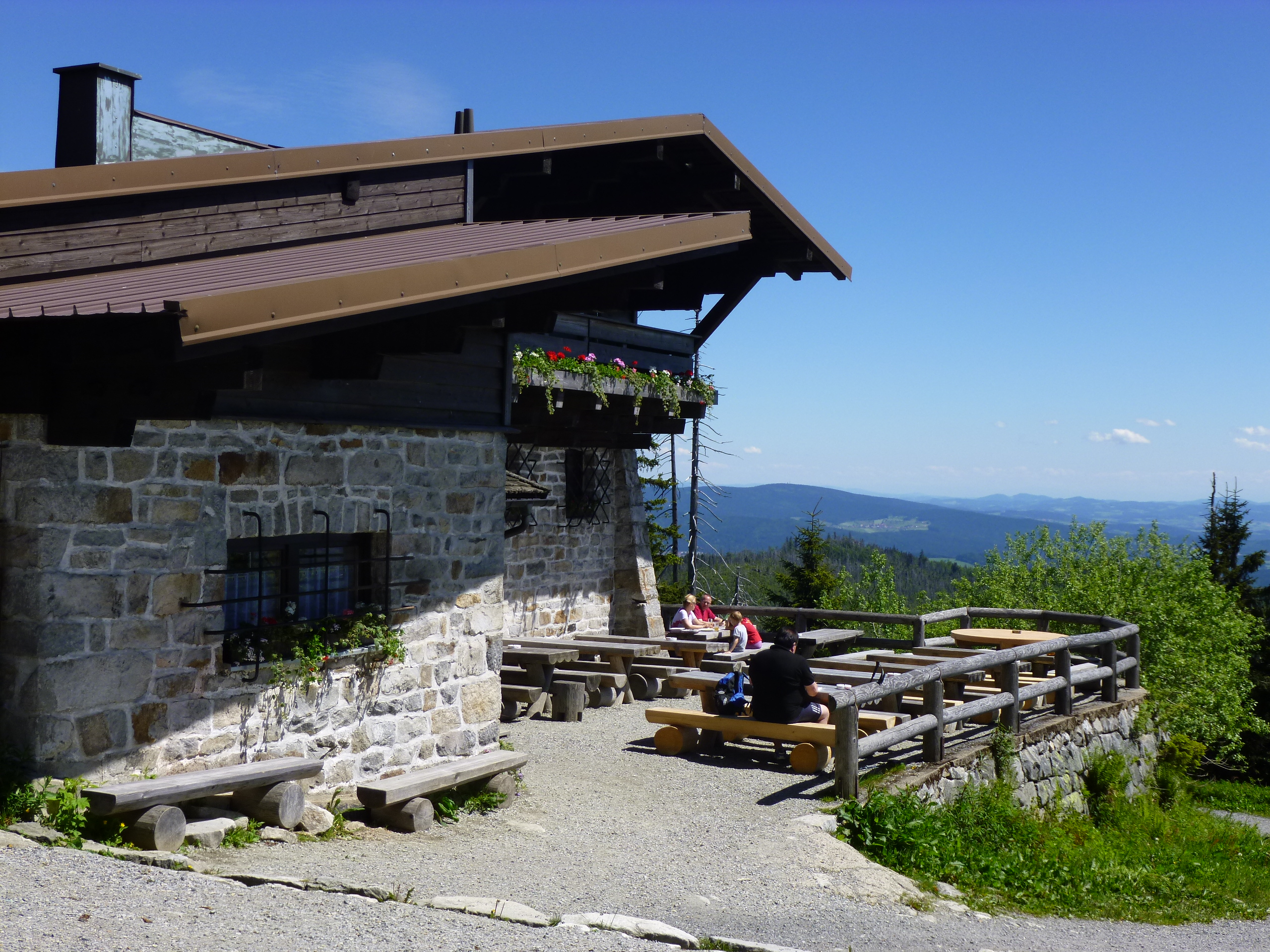
The Lusenschutzhaus

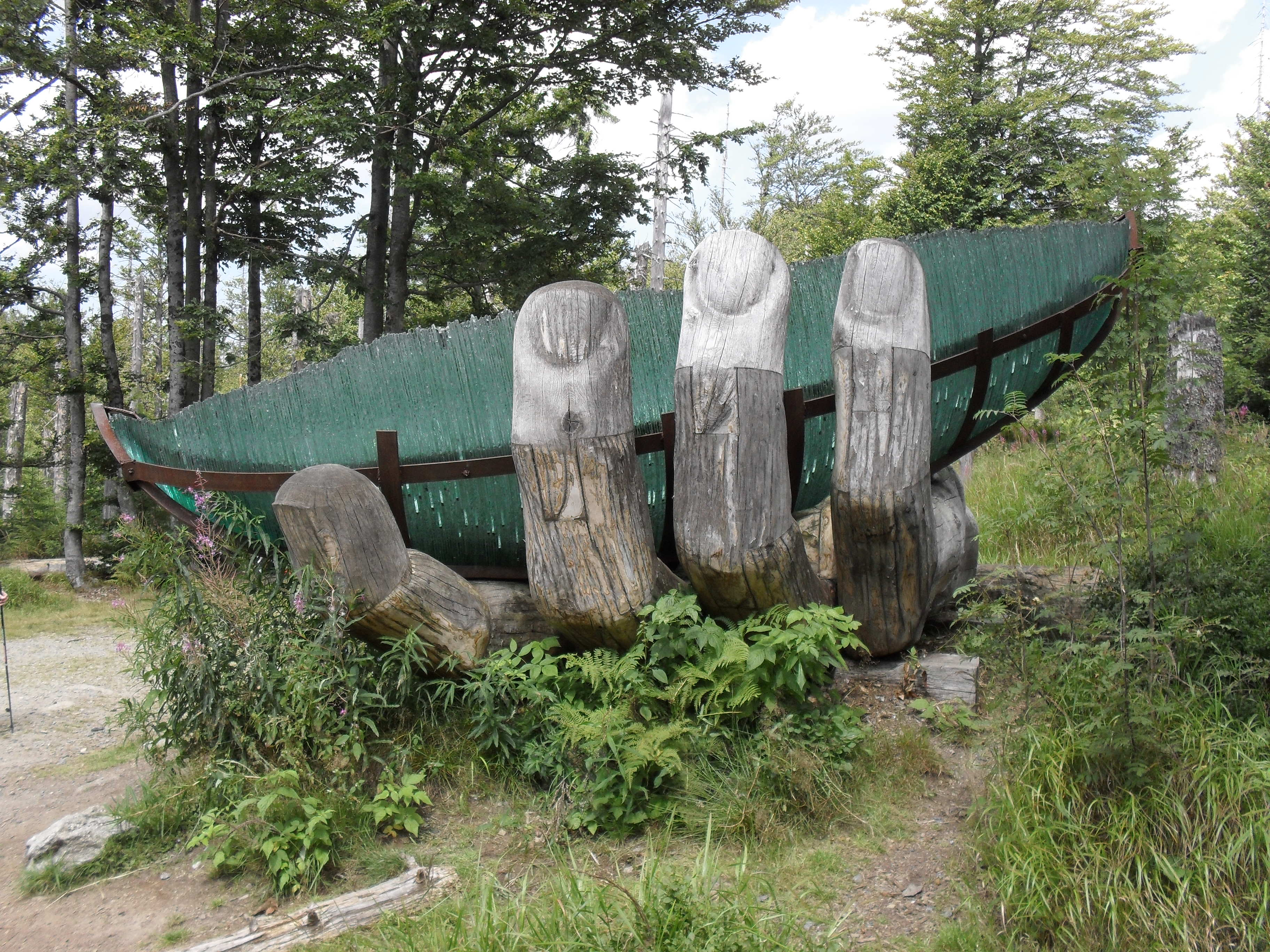
"GlasArche" - a glass vessel made by German glassmaker, hand carved Czech carvers.

== Description ==
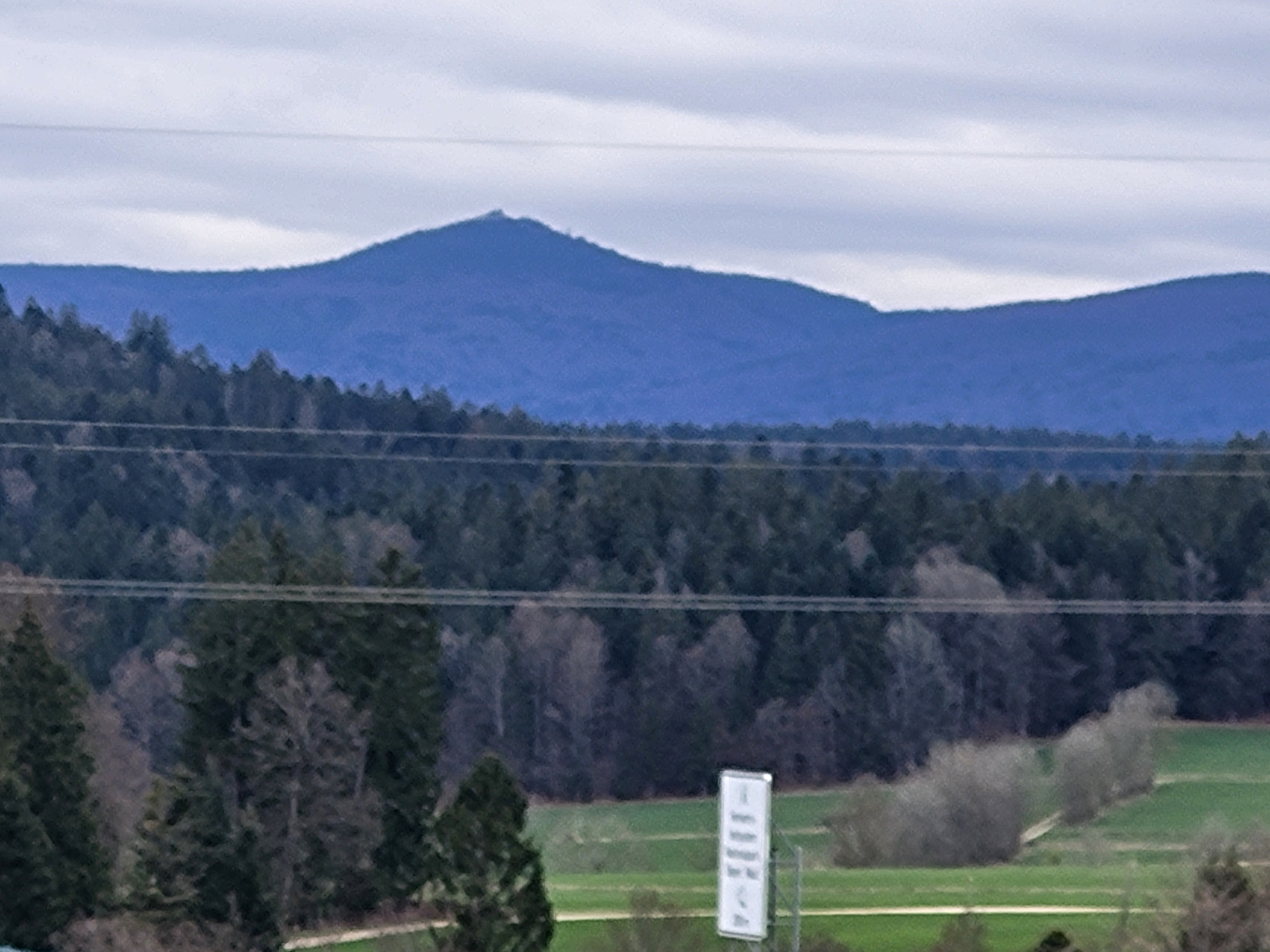
Lusen from Freyung

The mountain was already being called Lusen on the oldest known map of Bavaria from 1523, by Johannes Aventinus. According to modern sources, the name derives from the Celts. In 1947, the big cross on the peak was built by the Catholic youth Sankt Oswald-Riedlhütte, later renovated in 1992 because of a lightning strike. The statue of Jesus was later added in 2008. Right next to the mountain, there is a building called the Lusenschutzhaus from 1938, that offers accommodation, including when its winter.

== Hikes ==
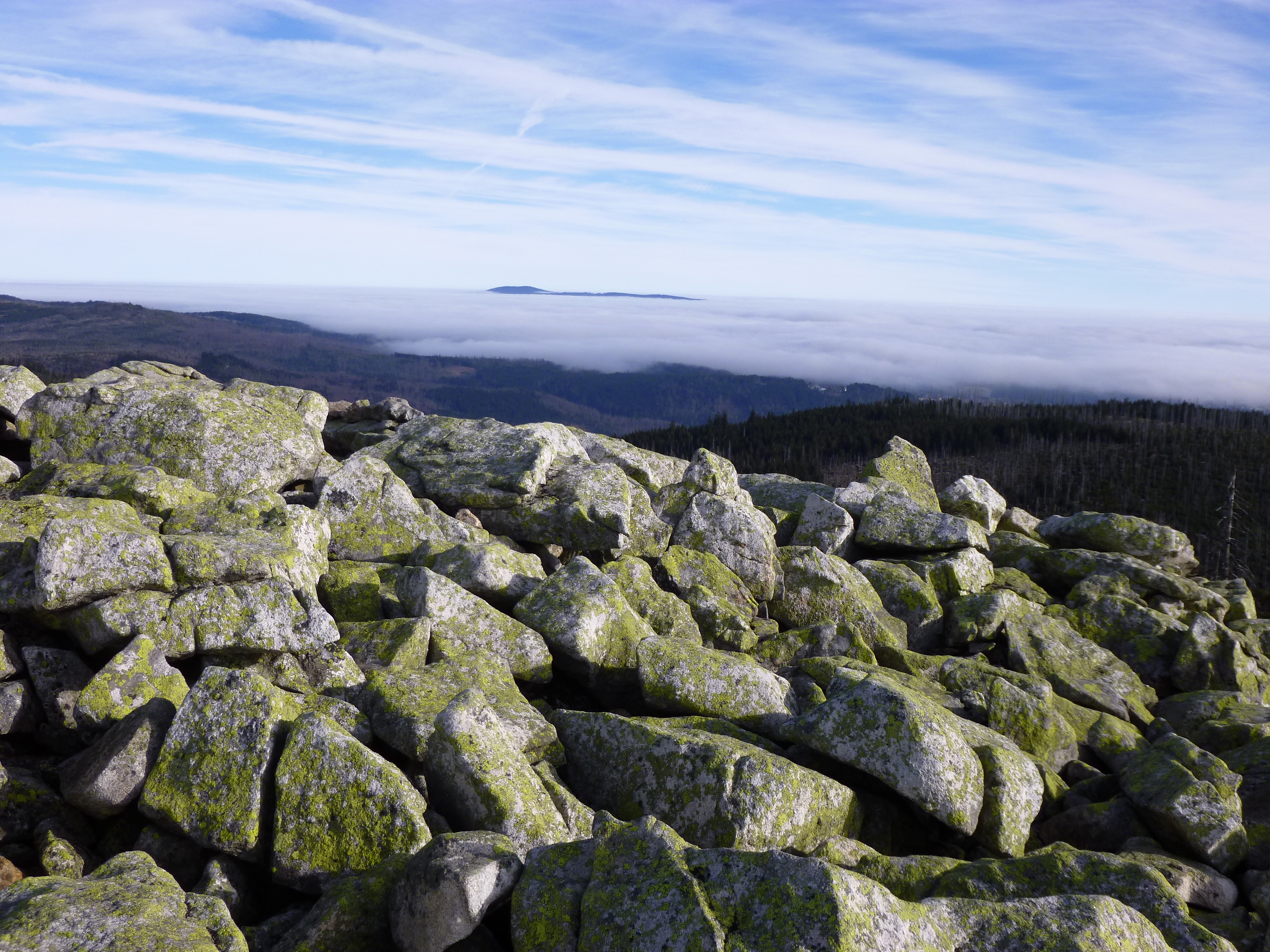
Nature seen when standing on the Blockmeer

The most popular tour begins just above Waldhäuser at the Waldhausreibe forester's lodge (1100 m above sea level), which can be reached during the day in summer with the buses that go through the national park. There, one can choose between two hiking trails, those being: the summer trail and the winter trail. At the Waldhausreibe, both are signposted and take 1 hour 15 minutes, but reasonably experienced hikers can manage these trails in 45 minutes at most. More ambitious hikers choose the Fredenbrücke (850 m above sea level) below Waldhäuser as their starting point, which can also be reached with same buses, and climb via Martinsklause, Teufelsloch and finally also via the summer trail to Lusen in around two hours. One way up to the mountain is called the Blockmeer, filled with granite stones.

== Damage by bark beetle ==
Until the 90s, almost the entire way to climb up the Lusen was through shady coniferous forest. After 1995, however, due to unusually warm weather, large parts of the old mountain spruce forest were starting to get damaged by bark beetle. In the Lusen area and to the north of it, the damage occurred almost uniformly over around 4000 hectares. In keeping with the principle of the concept of the Bavarian forest national park, no artificial defense measures were taken. The viewer from the Lusen summit was therefore presented with a picture in which the dead conifers dominated. The national park administration has decided not to remove any dead wood from the affected area and support "let nature be nature". Under the protection of the dead trees, a new forest grew back into a "wild forest" that is unique in Europe. The natural forest that is now gradually emerging, rich in tree species, is likely to be ecologically far superior to the usual monotonous timber forests. The “Hochwaldsteig” adventure trail on the Sommerweg provides insights into this natural forest development.
