= Frauenau Dam =

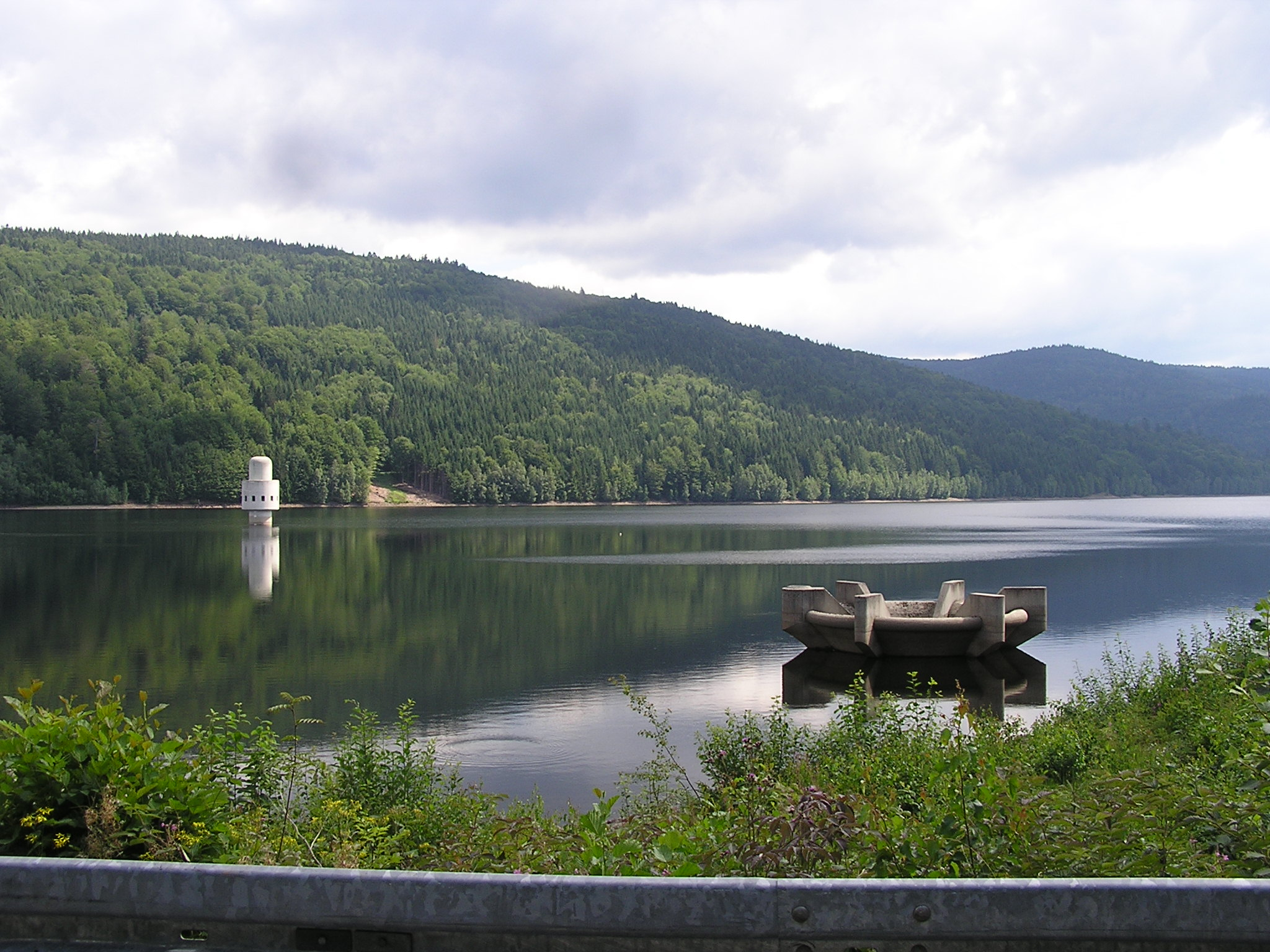
- Interactive map of Frauenau Dam
- Official name: Trinkwassertalsperre Frauenau
- Coordinates: 49.0137°N 13.3334°E
- Construction began: 1976–1983

Dam and spillways
- Impounds: Little Regen, Hirschbach
- Height (foundation): 84.7 or 86 m
- Height (thalweg): 70.5 m
- Length: 640 m (2,100 ft)
- Elevation at crest: 770.8 m
- Width (crest): 9 m
- Dam volume: 2.5 Mm³

Reservoir
- Total capacity: 21.7 Mm³
- Active capacity: 20.8 Mm³
- Catchment area: 30.4 km²
- Surface area: 94 ha
- Normal elevation: 767 m

Power Station
- Installed capacity: 617 kW

The Frauenau Dam (German: Trinkwassertalsperre Frauenau or Trinkwasserspeicher Frauenau) in the Bavarian Forest, in Germany, was built in 1983 to ensure the drinking water supply to large parts of Lower Bavaria.

== Description ==
Because there was a shortage of groundwater in the Bavarian Forest due to the geological situation there, in the years 1976 to 1983 a water storage reservoir was built near Frauenau and Zwiesel, that was fed by the Kleiner Regen and Hirschbach rivers which rose in the unsettled area on the Czech border between the Falkenstein and Rachel.

== See also ==
- List of dams in Germany
- List of tallest dams

== Literature ==
- Trinkwassertalsperre Frauenau, Heft 17 in der Schriftenreihe Wasserwirtschaft in Bayern, Oberste Baubehörde im Bayer. Innenministerium, 1984, ISSN 0721-6416.
- Talsperren in der Bundesrepublik Deutschland, Peter Franke, Wolfgang Frey, DNK - DVWK 1987, ISBN 3-926520-00-0
