= Kleiner Falkenstein =

Mountain in Germany

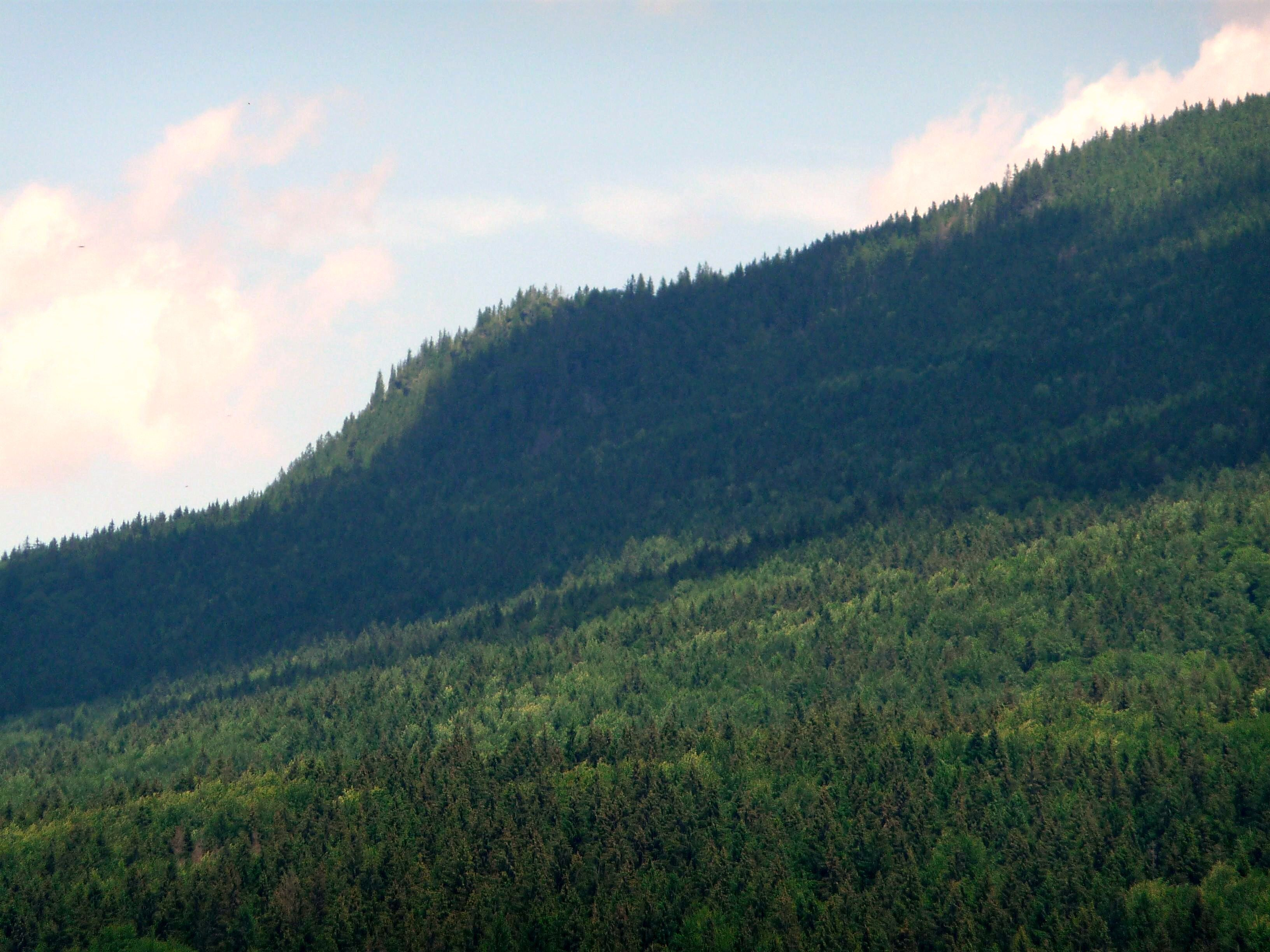

Highest point
- Prominence: 1,190 m (3,900 ft)
- Coordinates: 49°5′19″N 13°16′24″E

Geography
- Location within Bavaria
- Location: Bavaria, Germany

Kleiner Falkenstein is a mountain of 1190 metres in Bavaria, Germany. It is located in the Bavarian Forest National Park, just below the Großer Falkenstein.

From its rocky summit there are good views of the Großer Arber, the Osser, the Zwiesler Winkel and beyond to Bohemia. Many peregrine falcons nest in the rock face below the summit.

The nature reserve Kleiner Falkenstein was established by Reg. the Government of Lower and the Upper Palatinate, 31 October 1939. It was about 17 hectares and in 1997 was an extension of the Bavarian Forest National Park.
