= Church of the Assumption of the Blessed Virgin Mary, Frauenau =

Roman Catholic church in Bavaria, Germany

Coordinates: 48°59′22″N 13°18′00″E

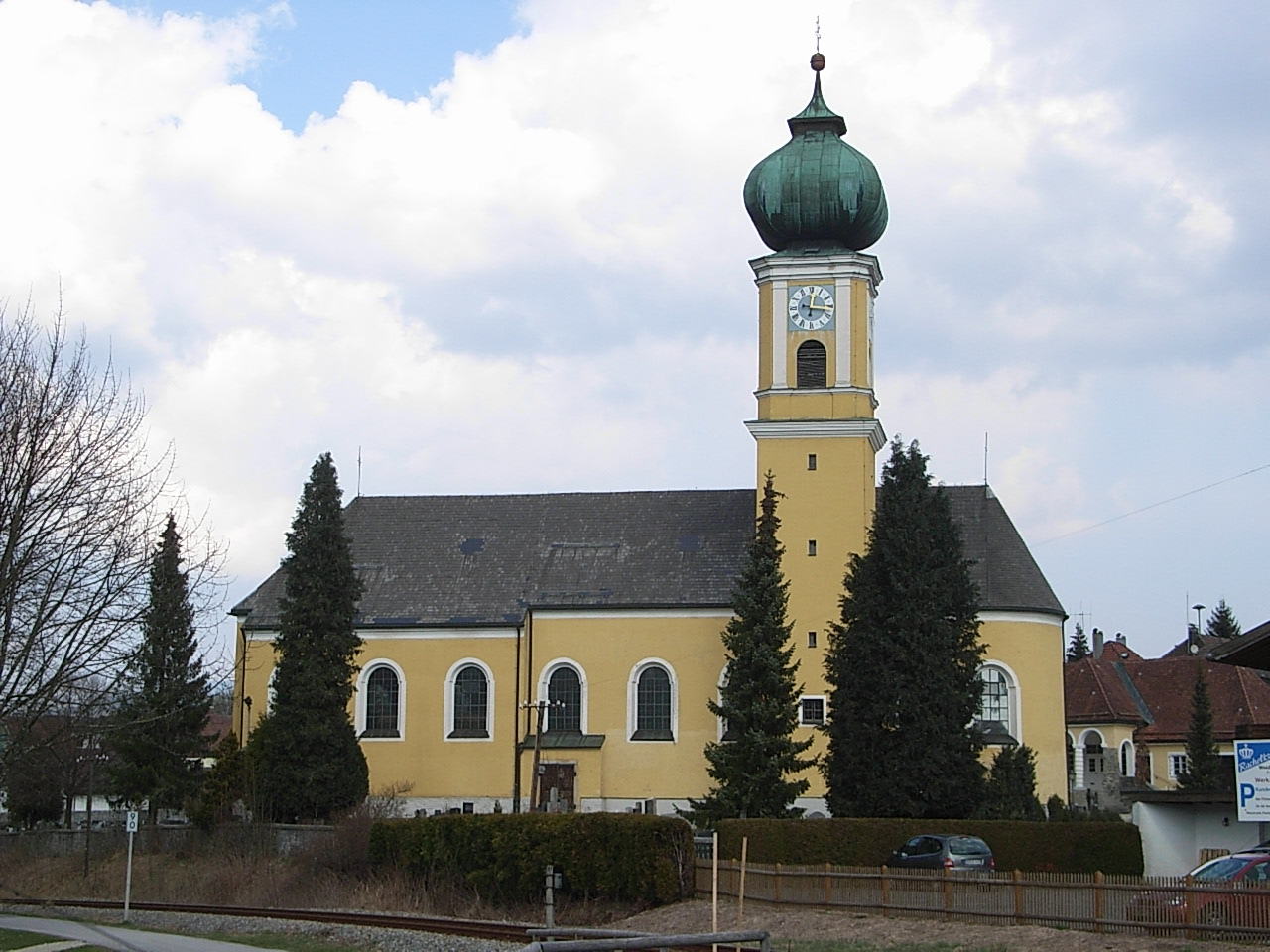
The parish church of Frauenau

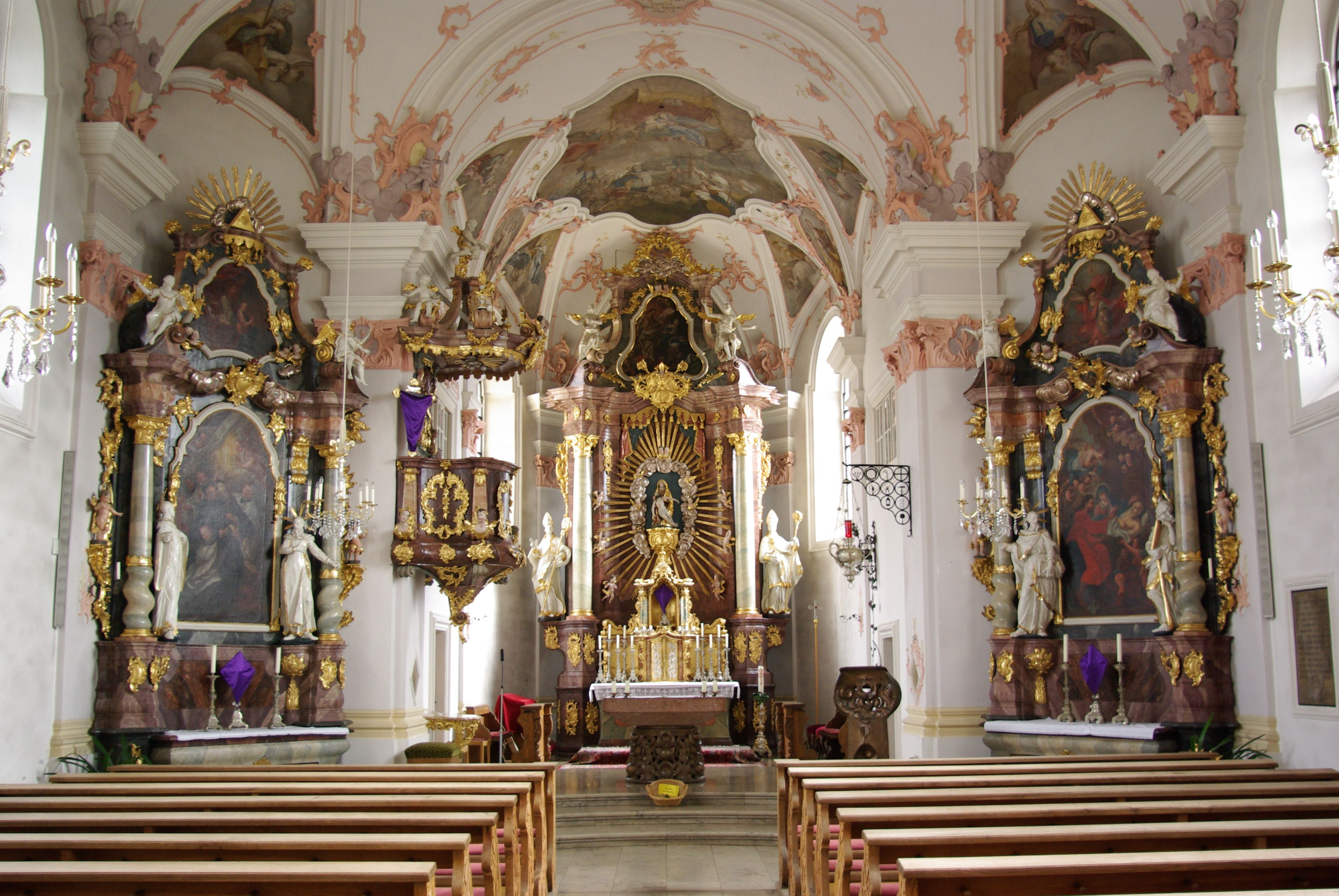
The interior of the church

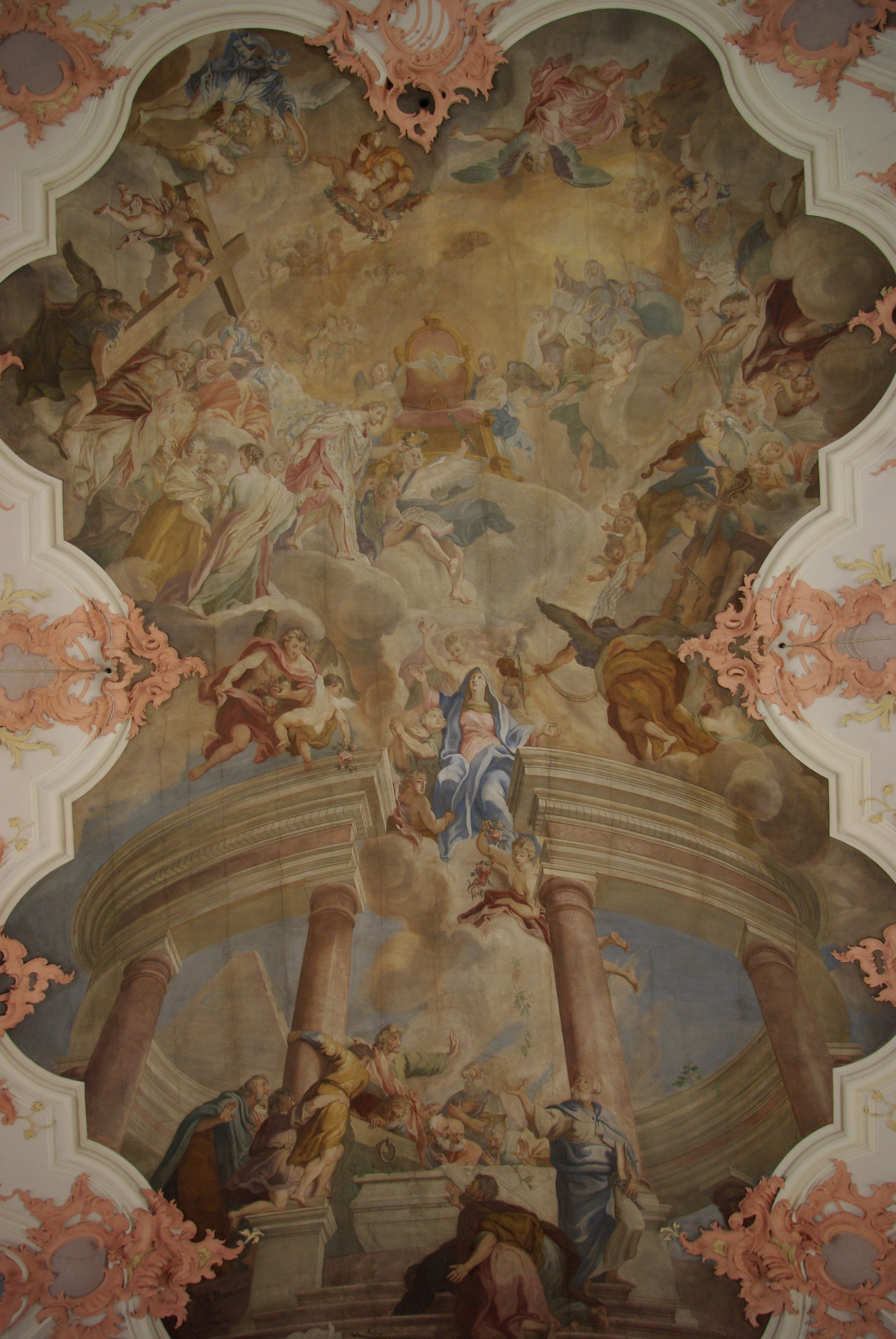
The ceiling mural

The Church of the Assumption of the Virgin Mary (German: Mariä Himmelfahrt) is the Roman Catholic parish church of the town of Frauenau in the county of Regen in the Bavarian Forest in Germany.

== History ==
Saint Hermann (of Niederaltaich) lived from 1324 until his death in 1326 as a hermit in a monastic cell in the ancient forest. His successor, Hartwig of Degenberg, built a chapel for a miraculous figure, "Our Dear Lady" (Unserer lieben Frau), the Blessed Virgin Mary. The region of "Our Dear Lady of Au" (Unsere liebe Frau Au) belonged to Niederaltaich Abbey on the River Danube. From the 14th century to the late 18th century, the miraculous image of the "Dolorous Mother of God" (schmerzhafte Muttergottes) was the destination of a pilgrimage. As early as 1352, Frauenau was therefore elevated to a parish and, in 1396, a Gothic church was built. Its architect was Hans Krumenauer (father of Stephan Krumenauer), who was also involved in the cathedral in Passau. From 1759 to 1767 a new church was built in the rococo style. The church was consecrated on 15 August 1767 and placed under the protection of Mary, the Mother of God. Until secularisation in 1803, the parish of Frauenau was managed by Niederaltaich Abbey and Priory of Rinchnach. In 1927 the church was extended to the west.

== Literature ==
- Roman Eder: Frauenau, Chronik eines Bayerwalddorfes. Vol. II. 1999.
- Kirchenführer Frauenau. Kath. Pfarramt Frauenau, 1993.
- 650 Jahre Pfarrei Frauenau. Kath. Pfarrkirchenstiftung Frauenau, 2003.
- Herbert Schindler: Große bayerische Kunstgeschichte. 1997.
- Der Landkreis Regen. Lkr. Regen, 1982.
- Raimund Kreutzer: Zu unserer lieben Frauen Aue. BBZ No. 186 p. 24, 2017.
