= Hinterschmiding (Verwaltungsgemeinschaft) =

- Verwaltungsgemeinschaft
- Location of Hinterschmiding within Freyung-Grafenau district
- Interactive map of Hinterschmiding
- Location within Germany Location within Bavaria
- Coordinates: 48°49′N 13°36′E
- Country: Germany
- State: Bavaria
- Admin. region: Lower Bavaria
- District: Freyung-Grafenau
- Seat: Hinterschmiding
- Subdivisions: 2 municipalities

Area
  - Total: 31.25 km^{2} (12.07 sq mi)

Population (2025-12-31)
  - Total: 3,022
  - Density: 96.70/km^{2} (250.5/sq mi)
- Time zone: UTC+01:00 (CET)
  - Summer (DST): UTC+02:00 (CEST)
- Website: www.vg-hinterschmiding.de

Hinterschmiding is a Verwaltungsgemeinschaft (municipal association) in the district Freyung-Grafenau in Bavaria, Germany. Its seat is in Hinterschmiding.

It consists of the following municipalities:

1. Hinterschmiding
2. Philippsreut
