= Grandelberg =

Mountain in Germany

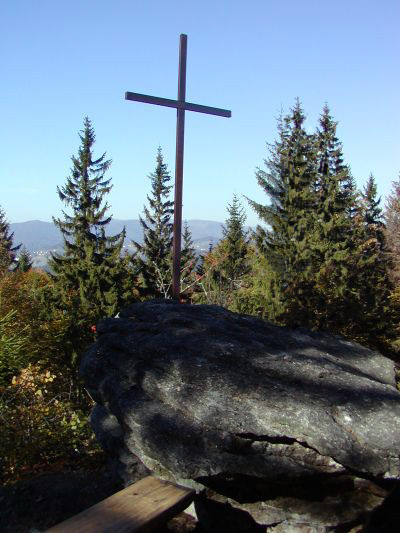
- The summit cross on the Grandelberg

Highest point
- Elevation: 1,110 m (3,640 ft)
- Coordinates: 48°51′12″N 13°37′52″E

Geography
- Location within Bavaria
- Location: Bavaria, Germany
- Parent range: Bavarian Forest

Geology
- Rock type: Gneiss

The Grandelberg, also known locally as the Schönbuchetfelsen, is one of the less well-known viewing mountains in the eastern Bavarian Forest in Germany. It is 1,110 metres high and located about 20 kilometres north of Freyung.

The Grandelberg is the local mountain of the village of Annathal (Howareidla), who erected a summit cross here in 2003. Because no waymarked footpath leads to the summit, it is only climbed by locals, unlike the nearby Almberg.

There are three large crags on the Grandelberg, hence its local name of "Schönbuchetfelsen" ("Schönbuchet Rocks"). Schönbuchet is the name of the woodland around the Grandelberg. The crag with the summit cross has a very good view of the village of Annathal.

Care is recommended when climbing the crags in wet weather.
