= Vorderschmiding =

Village in Bavaria

Coordinates: 48°49′N 13°35′E

Vorderschmiding is a village in the district of Freyung-Grafenau in Bavaria in Germany. It is part of the municipality of Hinterschmiding
