= Latschensee =

Lake in Bavaria, Germany

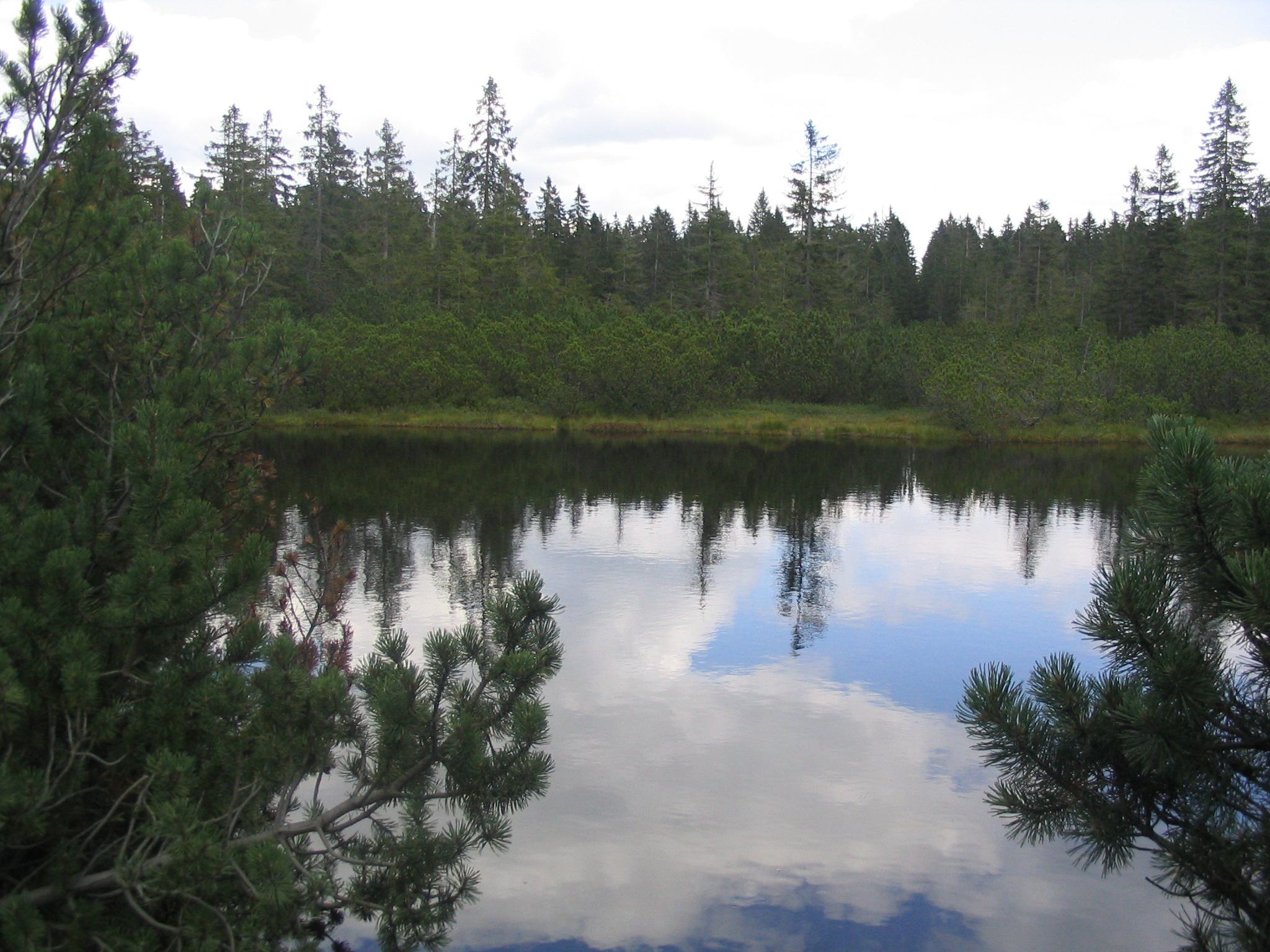

- Location within Bavaria
- Location: Bavarian Forest, Bavaria
- Coordinates: 49°01′31″N 13°23′52″E
- Primary outflows: none
- Basin countries: Germany
- Max. length: 45 m (148 ft)
- Max. width: 35 m (115 ft)
- Surface area: 0.1 ha (0.25 acres)
- Max. depth: 2 m (6 ft 7 in)
- Surface elevation: 1,150 m (3,770 ft)

Latschensee is a lake in the Bavarian Forest, Bavaria, Germany. It lies at an elevation of 1150 meters and has a surface area of 0.1 hectares.

The lake is located in the Bavarian Forest National Park (Nationalpark Bayerischer Wald), which is Germany's first national park and part of the largest single forest area in Central Europe.

Latschensee is a popular destination for hikers and outdoor enthusiasts, featuring a boardwalk that leads to a scenic overview. The lake, also referred to as a bog pond, is surrounded by spruce and other trees, grasses, moss and dwarf shrubs.
