= Philippsreut =

- Municipality
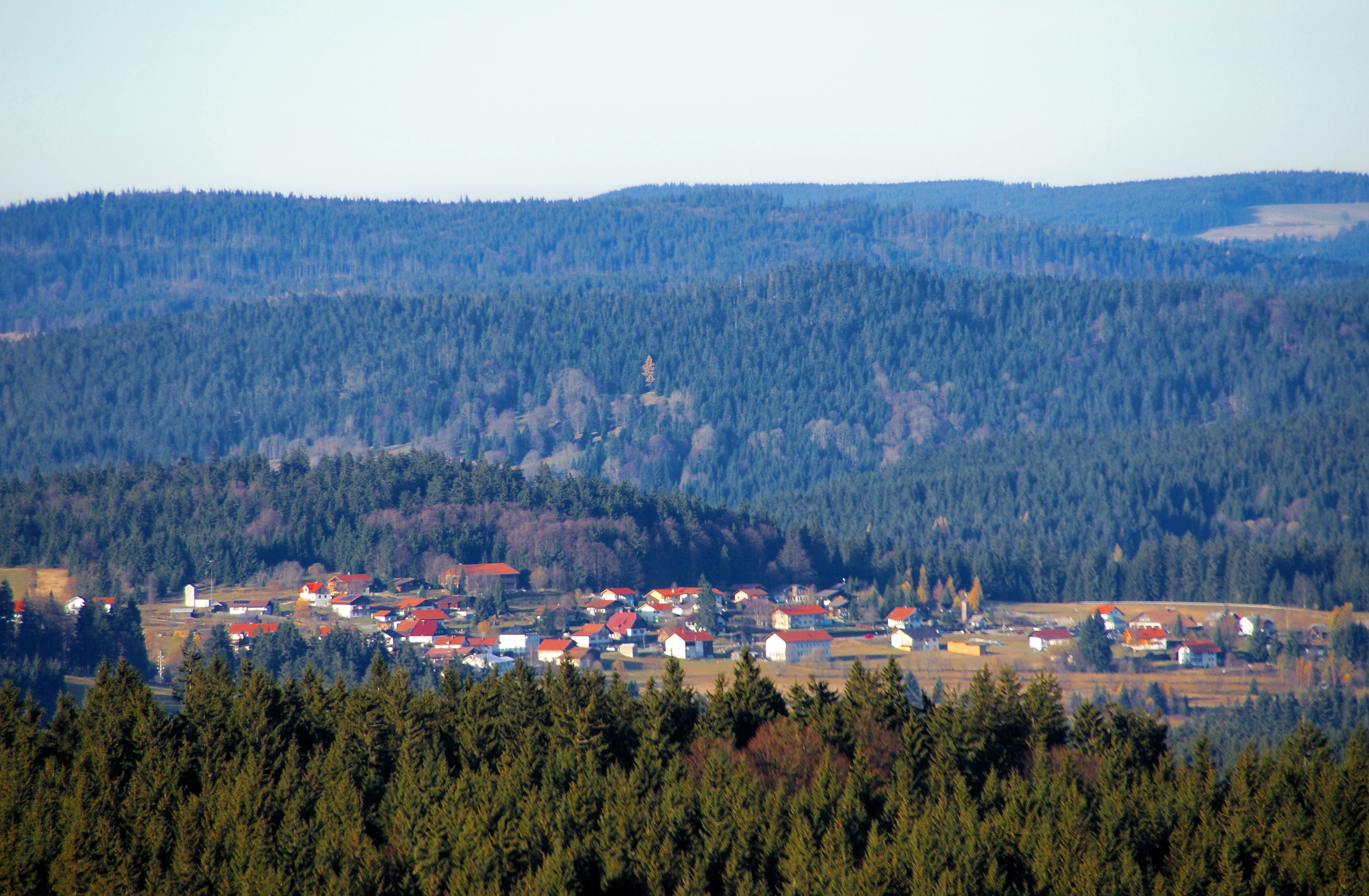
- Philippsreut as seen from the Haidel

- Coat of arms

- Location of Philippsreut within Freyung-Grafenau district
- Interactive map of Philippsreut
- Location within Germany Location within Bavaria
- Coordinates: 48°52′N 13°41′E
- Country: Germany
- State: Bavaria
- Admin. region: Niederbayern
- District: Freyung-Grafenau
- Municipal assoc.: Hinterschmiding

Government
  - Mayor (2020–26): Helmut Knaus (FW)

Area
  - Total: 10.16 km^{2} (3.92 sq mi)
- Elevation: 840–1,139 m (2,756–3,737 ft)

Population (2025-12-31)
  - Total: 622
  - Density: 61.2/km^{2} (159/sq mi)
- Time zone: UTC+01:00 (CET)
  - Summer (DST): UTC+02:00 (CEST)
- Postal codes: 94158
- Dialling codes: Philippsreut 08550/ Mitterfirmiansreut 08557/
- Vehicle registration: FRG
- Website: www.philippsreut.de

Philippsreut is a municipality in the district of Freyung-Grafenau in Bavaria, Germany. It lies on the border with the Czech Republic.

The village was founded in 1692 by Johann Philipp von Lamberg, Bishop of Passau, originally under the name Kleinphilippsreut ("Small Philip's Glade"), which name lasted until 1936. In times of founding it used to be a drinking station on the middle branch of the so-called "Golden Trail" (German: Goldener Steig), an important medieval trade route connecting Bavaria and Bohemia. When trade on the Golden Trail gradually disappeared (during the first half of the 18th century), the village remained a poor mountainous settlement, whose inhabitants lived – like the other peoples in the Bavarian/Bohemian Forest – mainly from logging and glassmaking. Today, main source of livelihood is tourism.

Despite its small size and remote location, Philippsreut has good transport connections: here ends the Bundesstraße (federal highway) B12 and is continued on the Czech side by the silnice I/4 (road of 1st class) which heads towards Prague.
