= Bavarian Forest National Park =

National Park in Bavaria, Germany

Bavarian Forest National Park (Nationalpark Bayerischer Wald)
- IUCN category II (national park)
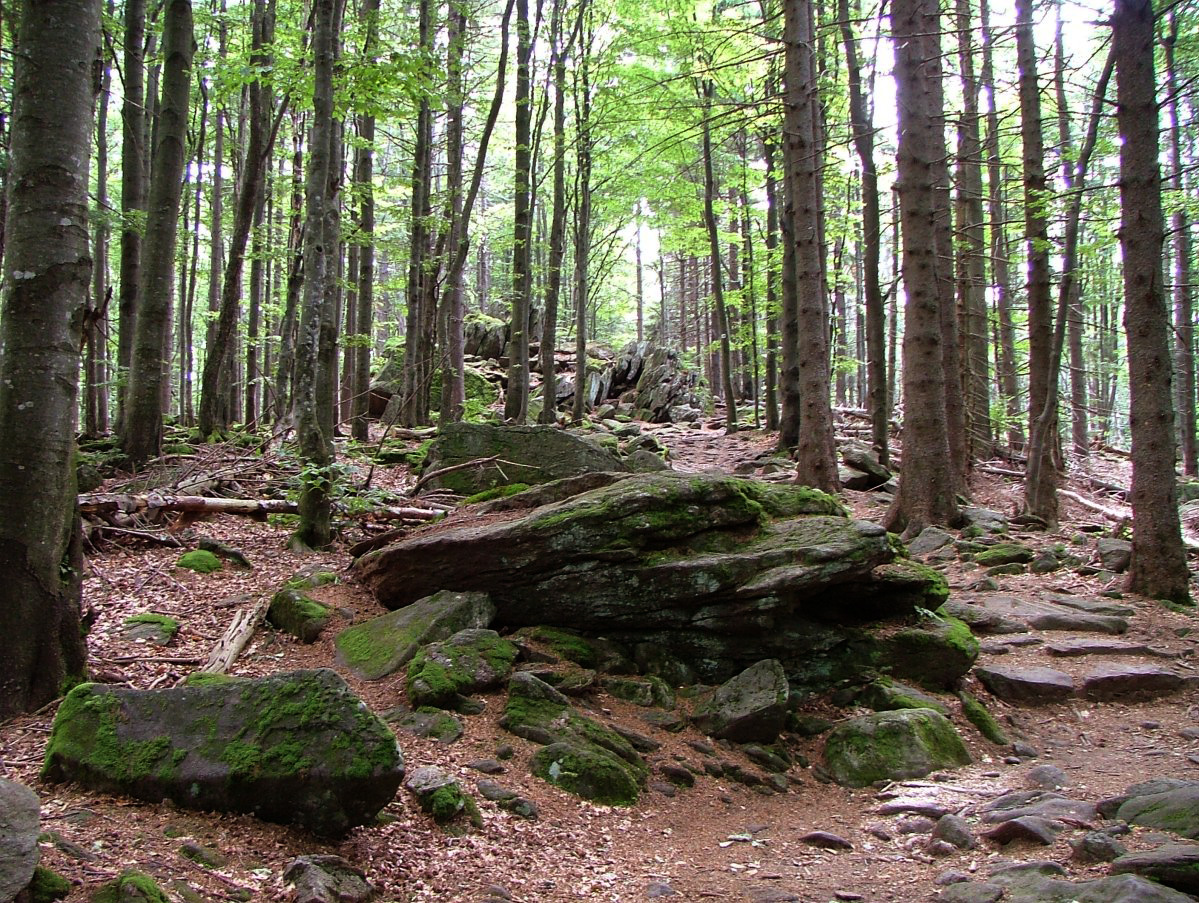
- Landscape typical of the Bavarian Forest National Park: rocky granite bedrock and mixed forest of Norway spruce and common beech

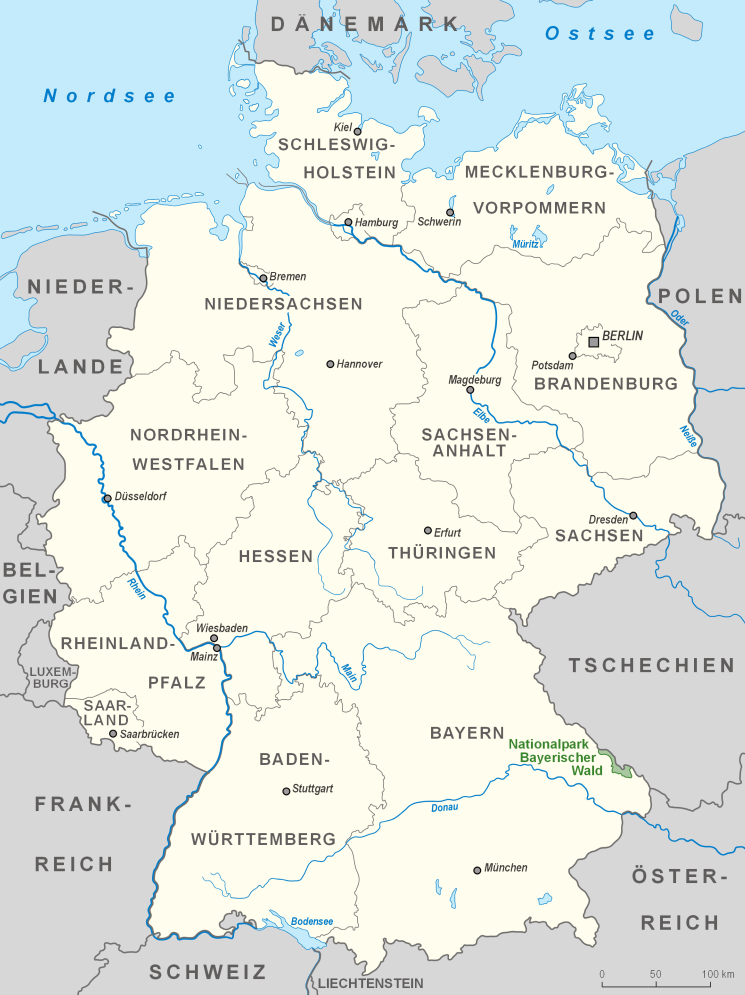
- Location: Webseiten des Nationalparks; Freyunger Straße 2; 94481 Grafenau
- Coordinates: 48°58′N 13°23′E
- Area: 24,217 ha (93.50 sq mi)
- Established: 7 Oct 1970

The Bavarian Forest National Park (German: Nationalpark Bayerischer Wald) is a national park in the Eastern Bavarian Forest immediately on Germany's border with the Czech Republic. It was founded on 7 October 1970 as the first national park in Germany. Since its expansion on 1 August 1997 it has covered an area of 24,250 hectares. Together with the neighbouring Czech Bohemian Forest the Bavarian Forest forms the largest contiguous area of forest in Central Europe.

== Description ==
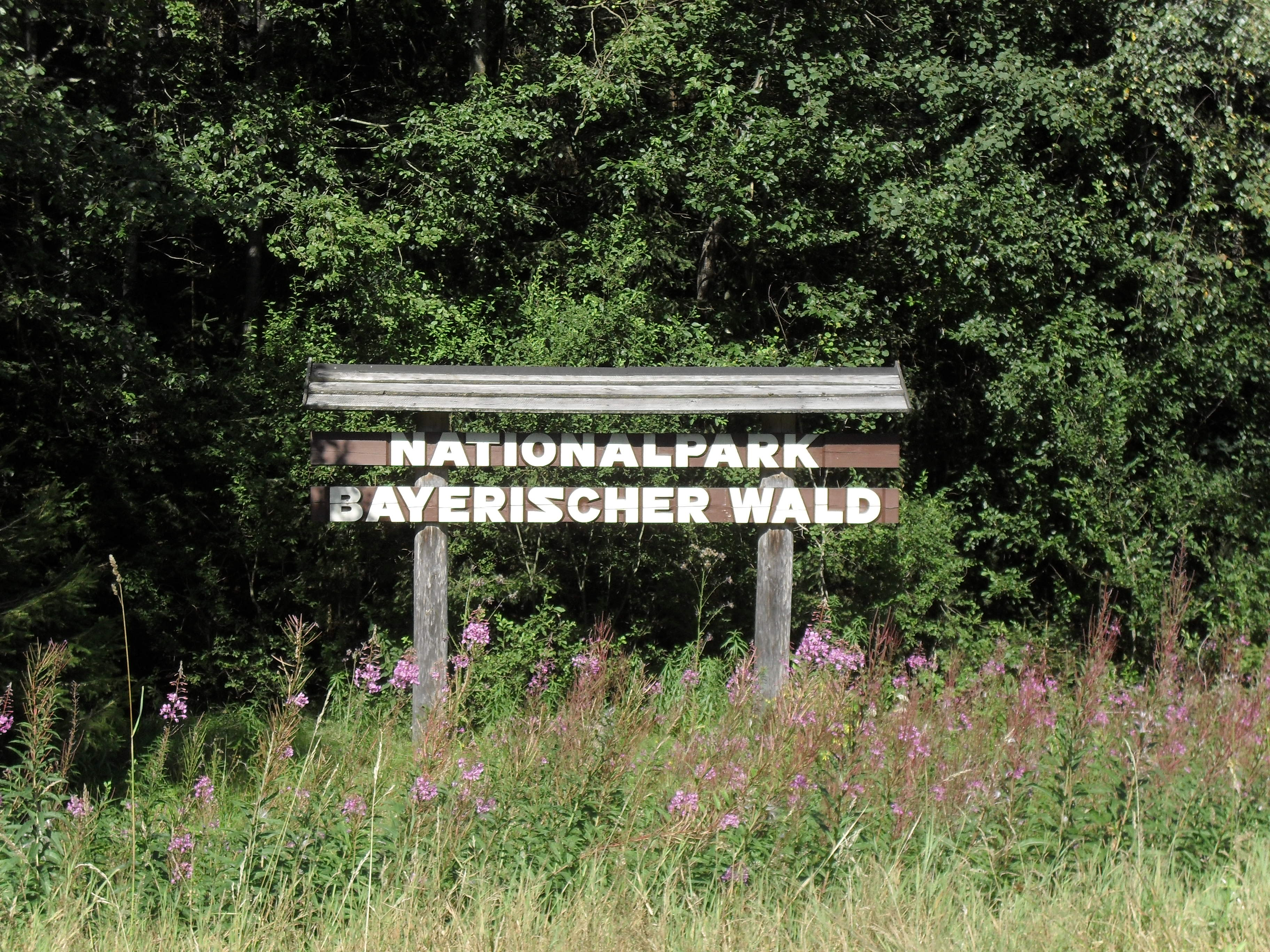
Bavarian Forest National Park

Especially protected are the Norway spruce–dominated highland forests, mixed mountain forests of European silver fir, European beech and spruce trees and water meadow spruce woods in the valleys. Although a few remnants of ancient forest remain, the National Park area is still heavily influenced by the former forestry industry. Since nature is now left to take its course again, there is no human intervention when there are catastrophic events such as large scale bark beetle infestation. This resulted in the death of a portion of the high elevation forests in the 1990s and triggered controversial discussions amongst the residents of the National Park, which highlighted differing attitudes to the wilderness. As the result of a compromise, bark beetle is now fought in the buffer area.

The highest peaks in the National Park are the Großer Falkenstein (1,305 m (4,281 ft)), the Lusen (1,373 m (4,505 ft)) and the Großer Rachel (1,453 m (4,767 ft)). In addition to the forests, there are also ecologically valuable raised bogs with bog lakes such as the Latschensee and former high meadows, the so-called Schachten, which spread even further on the Czech side of the border in the Bohemian Forest.

With over 700,000 visitors per year, the National Park is an important economic factor in the economically underdeveloped region of the Bavarian Forest.

== Geography ==
The National Park runs along the main ridge of the Bavarian Forest from the Großer Falkenstein (1,305 m) in the northwest past the Großer Rachel (1,453 m) to the Lusen (1,373 m) in the southeast.

According to the classification of the major natural regions of Germany it is part of the Rear Bavarian Forest (Hinterer Bayerischer Wald) in the Upper Palatine-Bavarian Forest.

On the other side of the border in the Czech Republic, the Bavarian Forest National Park is bounded by the Šumava National Park which is 68,064 hectares in area.

The national park is located in the eastern part of Bavaria in the counties of Regen and Freyung-Grafenau along the border with the Czech Republic and covers an area of 24,250 hectares of forest covering the low mountain range of the Bavarian Forest. It borders on the municipalities of (from north to south): Bayerisch Eisenstein, Zwiesel, Lindberg, Frauenau, Spiegelau, Sankt Oswald-Riedlhütte, Neuschönau, Hohenau and Mauth. Parts of the National Park are located on the territory of the respective communities and parts also lie in unparished areas.

There are many enclaves in the national park, especially around the edges:

- Zwieslerwaldhaus at the foot of the Großer Falkenstein belongs to the municipality Lindberg.
- Schleicher and Kreuzstraßl belong to Lindberg.
- Neuhütte and Jägerfleck in Spiegelau
- Guglöd, belongs to St. Oswald-Riedlhütte
- Waldhäuser on the Lusen, is part of Neuschönau, the largest enclave in the national park
- Altschönau, is part of Neuschönau.
- Sagwasser-Säge and Weidhütte form a joint functional enclave belonging to Hohenau and which is joined to the rest of the country, but can only be accessed on a road passing through the national park.
- Glashütte is part of Hohenau.

In addition, there are several other enclaves that comprise just one or a few small plots. These numerous enclaves, especially in the Altgebiet make the border very long there, and the buffer zone, where bark beetle control is allowed, extends far into the interior of the park (see below for more details).

== Ecology ==
=== Mammals ===
The park is home to many rare mammals such as the Eurasian lynx (Lynx lynx), wildcat (Felis silvestris), beaver (Castor fiber), Eurasian otter (Lutra lutra), western barbastelle (Barbastella barbastellus), Bechstein's bat (Myotis bechsteini) and the greater mouse-eared bat (Myotis myotis). Also present are red deer, of which two-thirds of the population overwinter in an enclosure, in order to prevent excessive grazing to the land. Even moose have been recorded in the park, from a population in the Lipno Reservoir, Czech Republic.

Lynx were eradicated from the National Park in around 1850, but in the 1970s five to ten were released into the park, along with another 17 released in the Šumava national park a decade later. This resulted in an initially strong increase in the lynx population in the region, but between 1995 and 2008, the population decreased significantly. This was possibly due to the illegal killing of the animals on both the Czech and Bavarian sides. Brown bears are not found in the wild in the park.

In 2016, a pair of wolves was discovered in the park.

=== Birds ===
Many rarely seen species of birds are found in the national park. These include capercaillie, hazel grouse, peregrine falcon, European honey-buzzard, black stork and Eurasian pygmy owl.

=== Insects ===
In the national park over 1800 beetle species have currently been identified, including 14 ancient woodland specialist species. Very rare insect species such as Tragosoma depsarium, a longhorn beetle which can only be found in forests rich in dead wood.

=== Plants ===
Rare and endangered plant species which are found in the national park include the Hungarian gentian, Swertia perennis and the mosses Buxbaumia viridis and Dicranum viride.

== Literature ==
- Kjirsten Coleman, Jörg Müller, Claudia Kuenzer: Remote Sensing of Forests in Bavaria: A Review, Remote Sensing, 6(10), 1805, 2024
- Hans Bibelriether, Hartmut Strunz: Unterwegs im Nationalpark Bayerischer Wald. Ein Führer für Wanderer und Naturfreunde. Wald erleben, Natur verstehen. Morsak, Grafenau 1990, 213 S., ISBN 3-87553-353-4
- Hans Bibelriether, Hannes Burger: Nationalpark Bayerischer Wald. Süddeutscher Verlag und Morsak-Verlag, München und Grafenau 1983, 175 S., ISBN 3-7991-6193-7 und ISBN 3-87553-202-3
- Marco Heurich, Hans Jehl: Waldentwicklung im Bergwald nach Windwurf und Borkenkäferbefall. Grafenau 2001. 182 S. ISBN 3-930977-26-5
- Marco Heurich, Markus Neufanger: Die Wälder des Nationalparks Bayerischer Wald. Ergebnisse der Waldinventur 2002/2003 im geschichtlichen und waldökologischen Kontext. Nationalpark Bayerischer Wald: Wissenschaftliche Reihe, Heft 16. Nationalparkverwaltung Bayerischer Wald, Grafenau 2005, 176 S., ISBN 3-930977-28-1
- Stefan Nüßlein: Zur Waldentwicklung im Nationalpark Bayerischer Wald 1999. Buchdrucker-Massenvermehrung und Totholzflächen im Rachel-Lusen-Gebiet. Berichte aus der Bayerischen Landesanstalt für Wald und Forstwirtschaft, Nr. 25. Bayerische Landesanstalt für Wald und Forstwirtschaft (LWF), Freising 2000, 47 S.
- Wolfgang Scherzinger: Artenschutzprojekt Auerhuhn im Nationalpark Bayerischer Wald von 1985–2000. Nationalpark Bayerischer Wald: Wissenschaftliche Reihe, Heft 15. Nationalparkverwaltung Bayerischer Wald, Grafenau 2003, 130 S., ISBN 3-930977-27-3
- Wolfgang Scherzinger, Michael Held: Wilde Waldnatur: der Nationalpark Bayerischer Wald auf dem Weg zur Waldwildnis. Nationalparkverwaltung Bayerischer Wald, Passau 2000, 43 S. Online verfügbar
- Karl Friedrich Sinner, Günter Moser: Waldwildnis grenzenlos. Nationalpark Bayerischer Wald. Buch- und Kunstverlag Oberpfalz, Amberg 2006, 128 S., ISBN 978-3-935719-37-7 oder ISBN 3-935719-37-X
- Hubert Weinzierl, Hans Bibelriether, Georg Sperber: Nationalpark Bayerischer Wald. Verlag Morsak, Grafenau, 1972, 184 S., ISBN 387553-010-1

== Filmography ==
- Nationalpark Bayerischer Wald. Dokumentarfilm, 45 Min., Deutschland, 1987, von Robert Anzeneder und Jens-Uwe Heins, Produktion: Komplett-Media-GmbH, Grünwald (ISBN 3-89672-488-6), Kurzbeschreibung des NDR
- Natur erleben im Nationalpark Bayerischer Wald – Neuer Film, der sich mit dem Ökosystem Wald beschäftigt, DVD, Informationen und Vorschau hier: http://www.nationalparkfilm.de

== See also ==
- Bavarian Forest National Park in the natural region division: D 63 Upper Palatine-Bavarian Forest, including 403 Hinterer Bayerischer Wald
- Bavarian Forest Club
