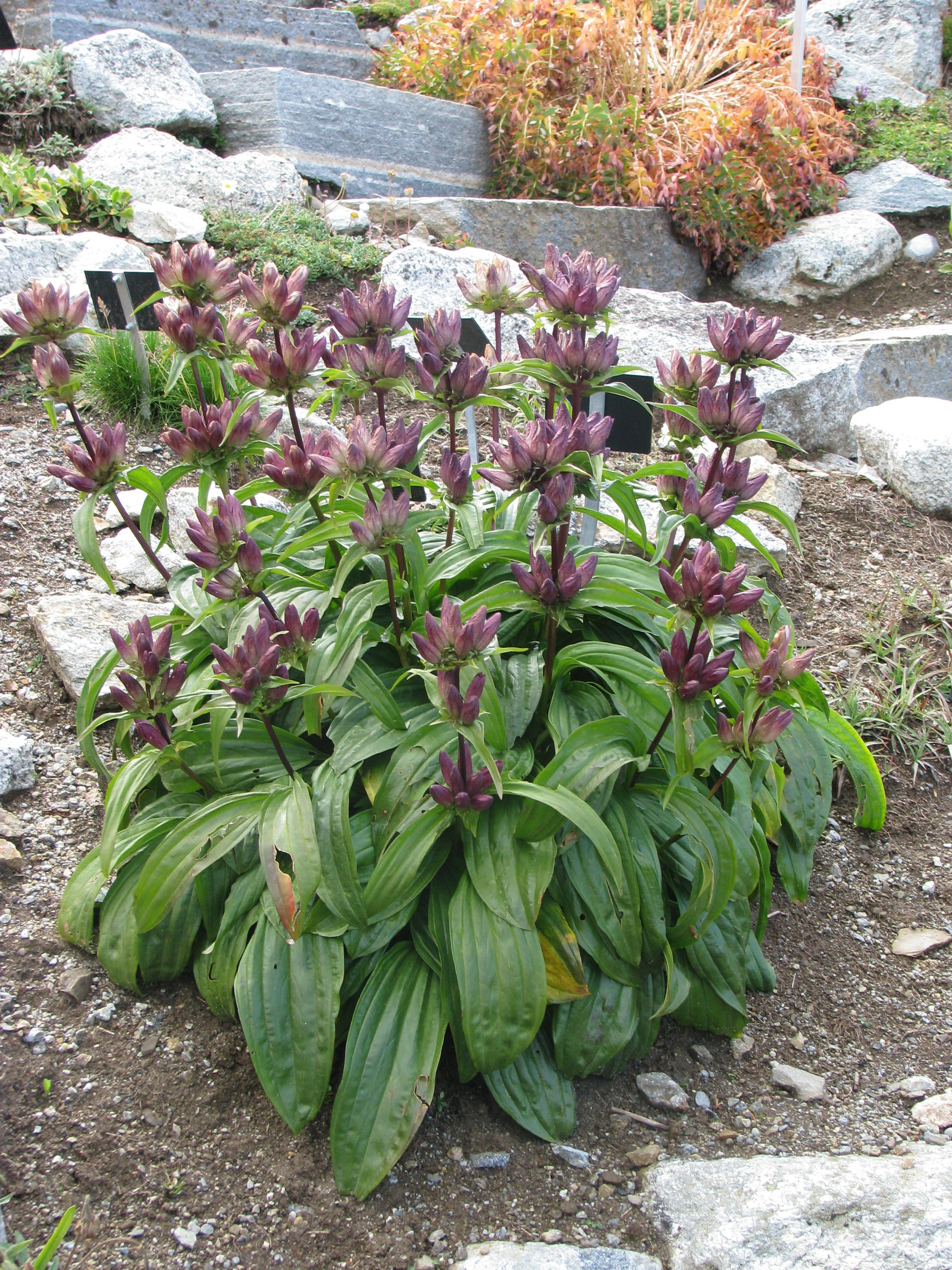

Conservation status
- Near Threatened (IUCN 3.1)

Scientific classification
- Kingdom: Plantae
- Clade: Tracheophytes
- Clade: Angiosperms
- Clade: Eudicots
- Clade: Asterids
- Order: Gentianales
- Family: Gentianaceae
- Genus: Gentiana
- Species: G. pannonica

Binomial name
- Gentiana pannonica Scop.

Synonyms
- List: Gentiana purpurea var. pannonica (Scop.) Gaudin; Pneumonanthe pannonica (Scop.) F.W.Schmidt; Coilantha pannonica G.Don; Gentiana punctata Jacq.; Gentiana purpurea Schrank; Gentiana semifida Hoffmanns. ex Rchb.

= Gentiana pannonica =

Hungarian gentian

Species of plant

Gentiana pannonica, the Hungarian gentian or brown gentian, is a species of flowering plant in the family Gentianaceae.

== Description ==
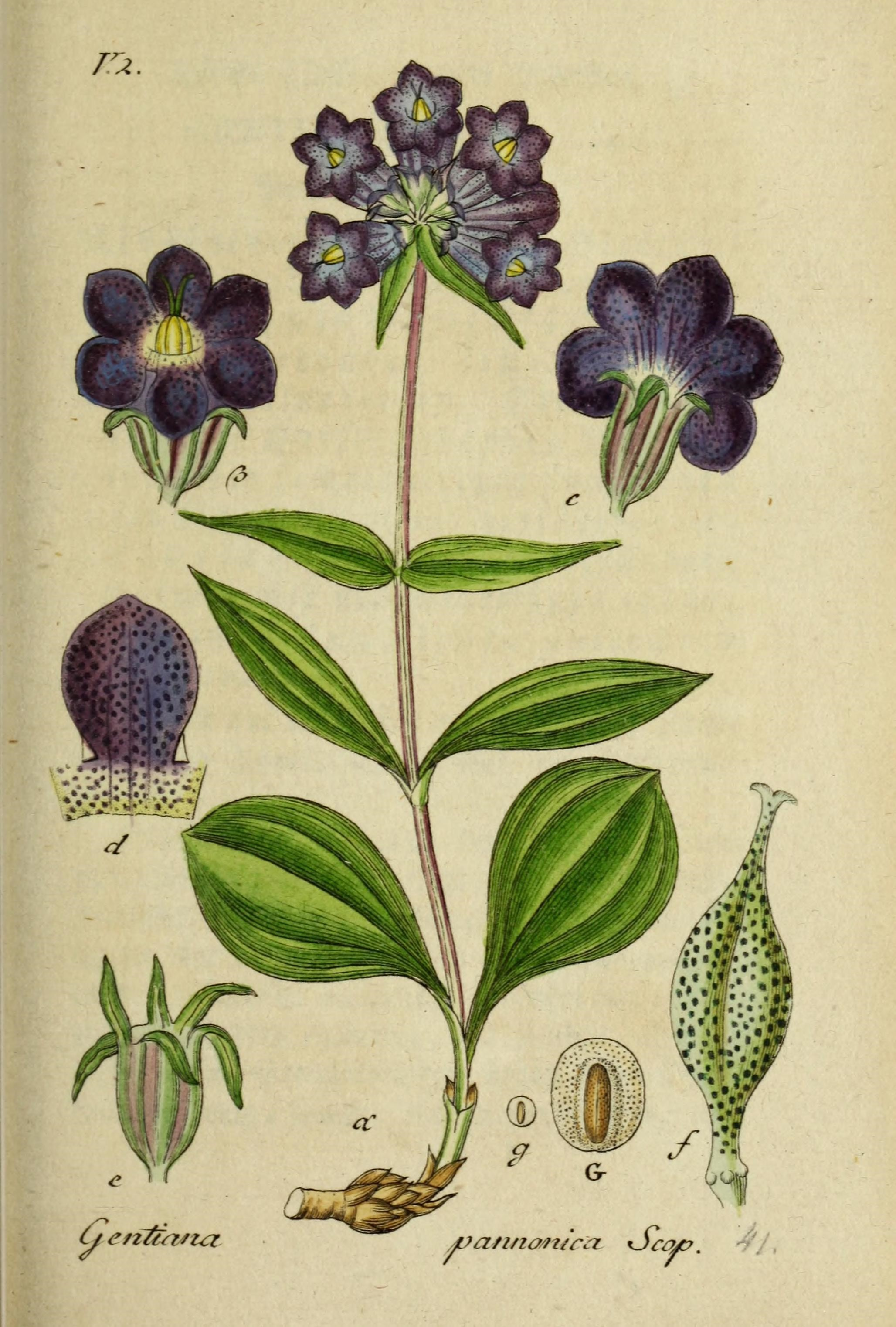
Illustration from Deutschlands Flora in Abbildungen nach der Natur

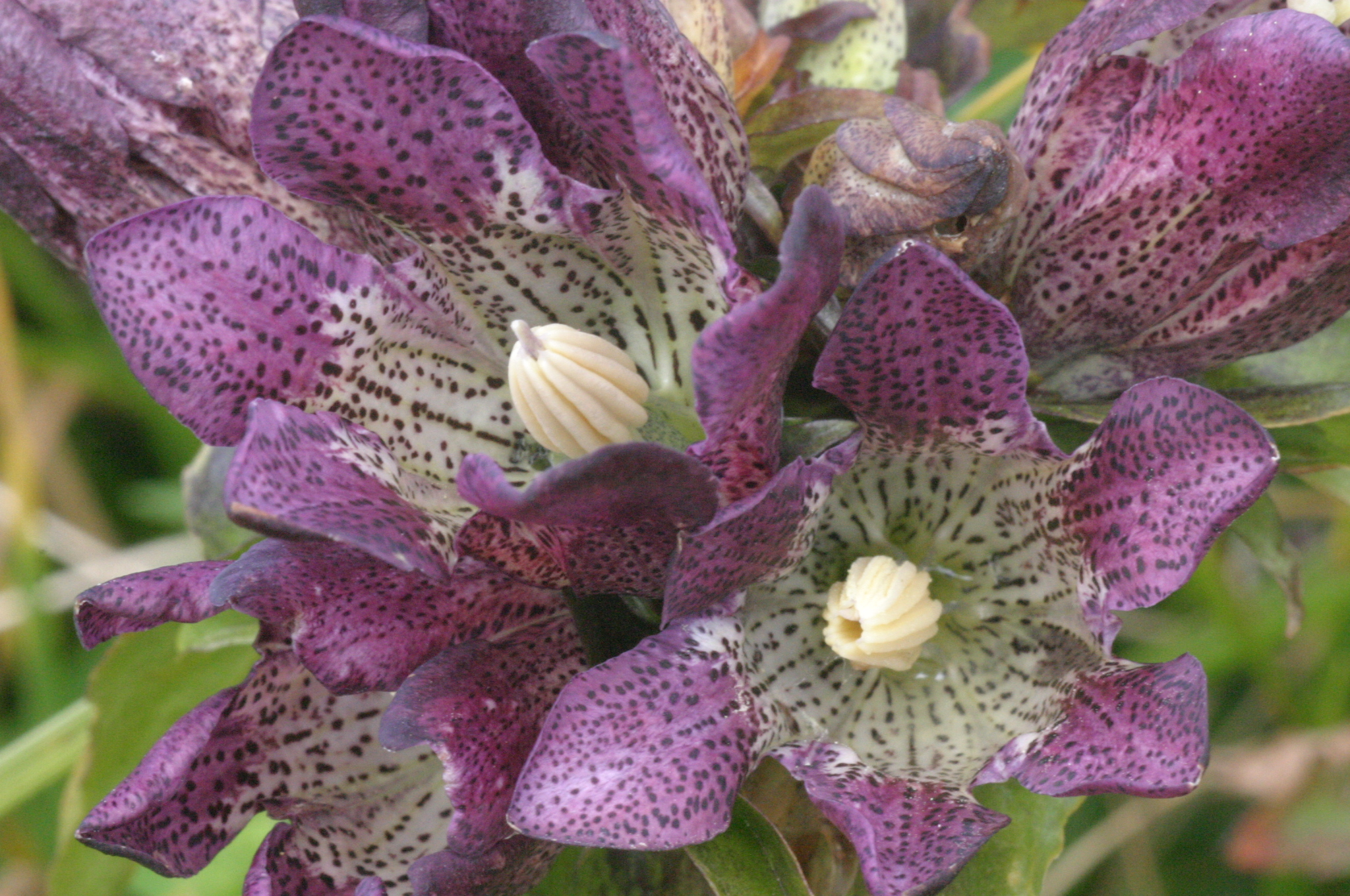
Flower detail

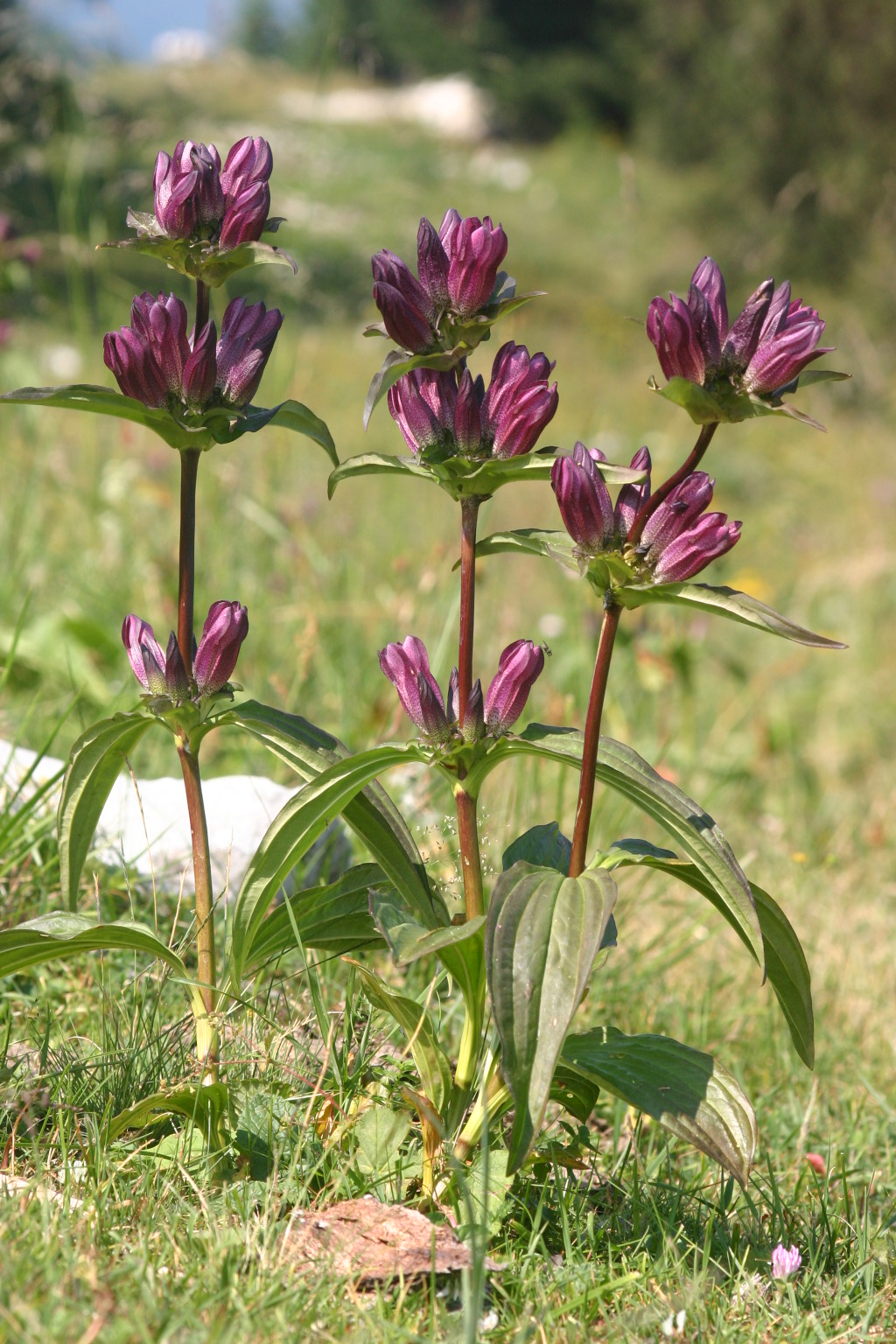
Habit: leaves and flowers opposite

=== Description ===
The Hungarian gentian is a perennial, herbaceous plant, which grows to a height of 20 to 60 centimetres. All the above-ground parts of the plant are hairless. Its stem is upright and strong.

The five to seven-veined leaves are decussate. The lower leaves are petiolate and elliptic in shape; the upper ones are sessile and lanceolate.

The Hungarian gentian flowers from July to September. Its flowers are located in the upper leaf axils or grouped at the end of the stem.

The hermaphroditic flowers are radially symmetrical with double perianths. The green sepals are fused. The calyx is bell-shaped and has five to eight outward curving teeth. The bell-shaped corolla is 25 to 50 millimetres long. It is wider at the top and, towards the middle, has five to nine petals. The corolla tip is ovate. On their outer side, the petals are red and violet with black and red spots, the inside is usually yellowish.

Its chromosome count is 2n = 40.

== Taxonomy ==
The first publication of Gentiana pannonica was by Giovanni Antonio Scopoli. The species epithet pannonica derives from the Roman province of Pannonia.

== Similar species ==
The Hungarian gentian is very similar to the purple gentian (Gentiana purpurea).

== Distribution and habitat ==
=== Range ===
The Hungarian gentian is found in the Eastern Alps, Bergamasque Alps, Carpathians and Transylvania. The western boundary of the gentian (Allgäu, eastern Switzerland) is coincident with the eastern boundary of the purple gentian.

In Austria the Hungarian gentian is scattered to moderately common (e.g. on the Krippenstein/Dachstein). It does not occur in Vienna or the Burgenland. In Germany it occurs in the alms of the Bavarian Forest, including within the Bavarian Forest National Park.

=== Habitat ===
The Hungarian gentian thrives best on calcareous soil, but also on soils poor in calcium. It occurs in Central Europe in perennial meadows and cirques, bogs and mountain pine bush. The Hungarian gentian is a character species of the Nardion community, but also occurs in plant communities of the sub-group rhododendro-vaccinienion.

== Uses and conservation ==
The Hungarian gentian is an old medicinal herb and is used like the yellow gentian. Because it was intensively used in former times, its stocks shrank to just small residual populations. As a result, the IUCN placed it in the "near threatened" category. For the conservation of this species habitat management plans were created or adjusted.
