= Hinterschmiding =

- Municipality
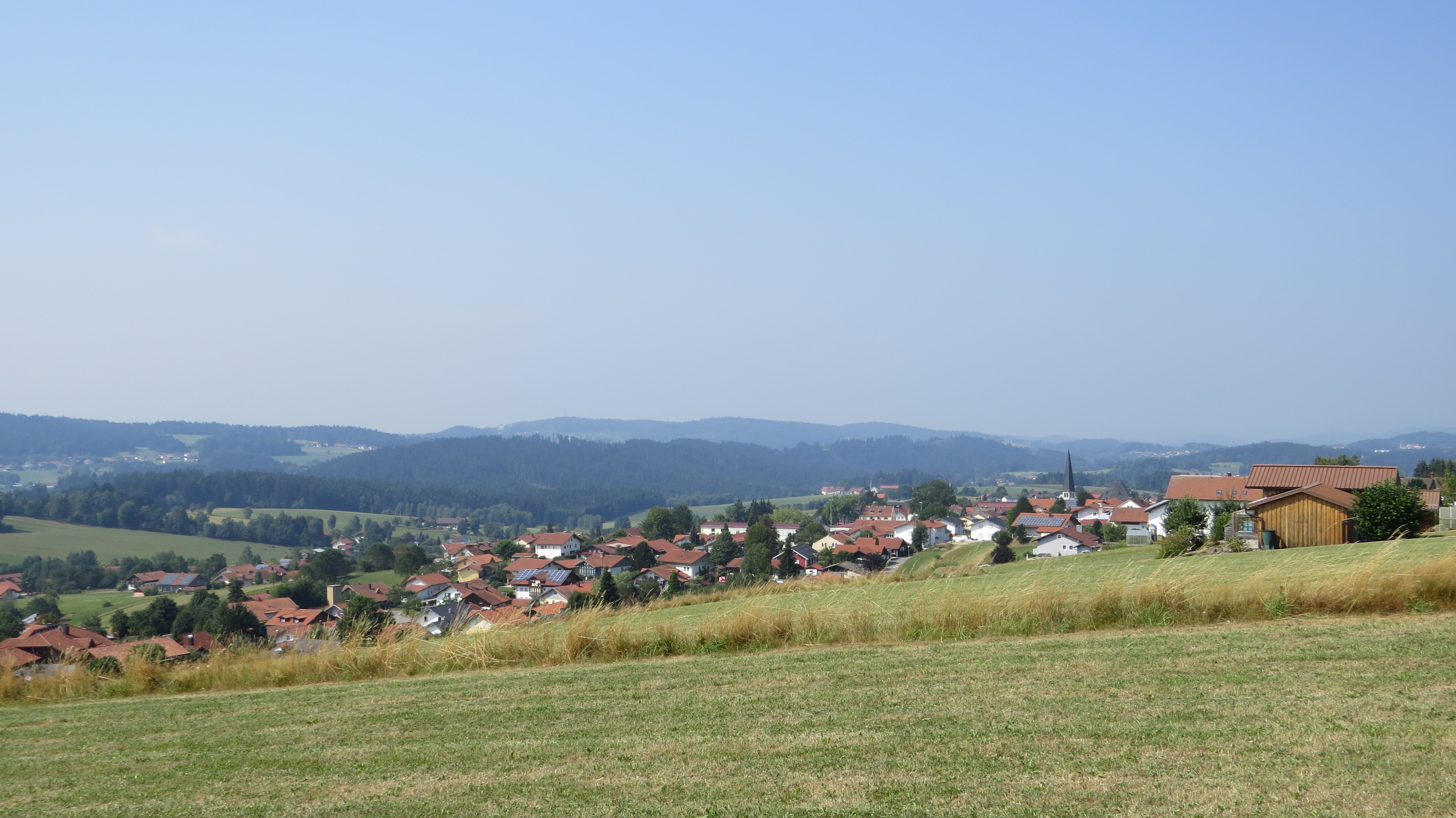
- Hinterschmiding seen from the east

- Coat of arms

- Location of Hinterschmiding within Freyung-Grafenau district
- Interactive map of Hinterschmiding
- Location within Germany Location within Bavaria
- Coordinates: 48°49′N 13°36′E
- Country: Germany
- State: Bavaria
- Admin. region: Niederbayern
- District: Freyung-Grafenau
- Municipal assoc.: Hinterschmiding

Government
  - Mayor (2020–26): Fritz Raab

Area
  - Total: 21.04 km^{2} (8.12 sq mi)
- Elevation: 635–900 m (2,083–2,953 ft)

Population (2025-12-31)
  - Total: 2,400
  - Density: 110/km^{2} (300/sq mi)
- Time zone: UTC+01:00 (CET)
  - Summer (DST): UTC+02:00 (CEST)
- Postal codes: 94146
- Dialling codes: 08551
- Vehicle registration: FRG
- Website: www.hinterschmiding.de

Hinterschmiding is a municipality in the district of Freyung-Grafenau in Bavaria in Germany. Populated places within the municipality include Vorderschmiding.
