= Lackenberg =

Mountain in Germany

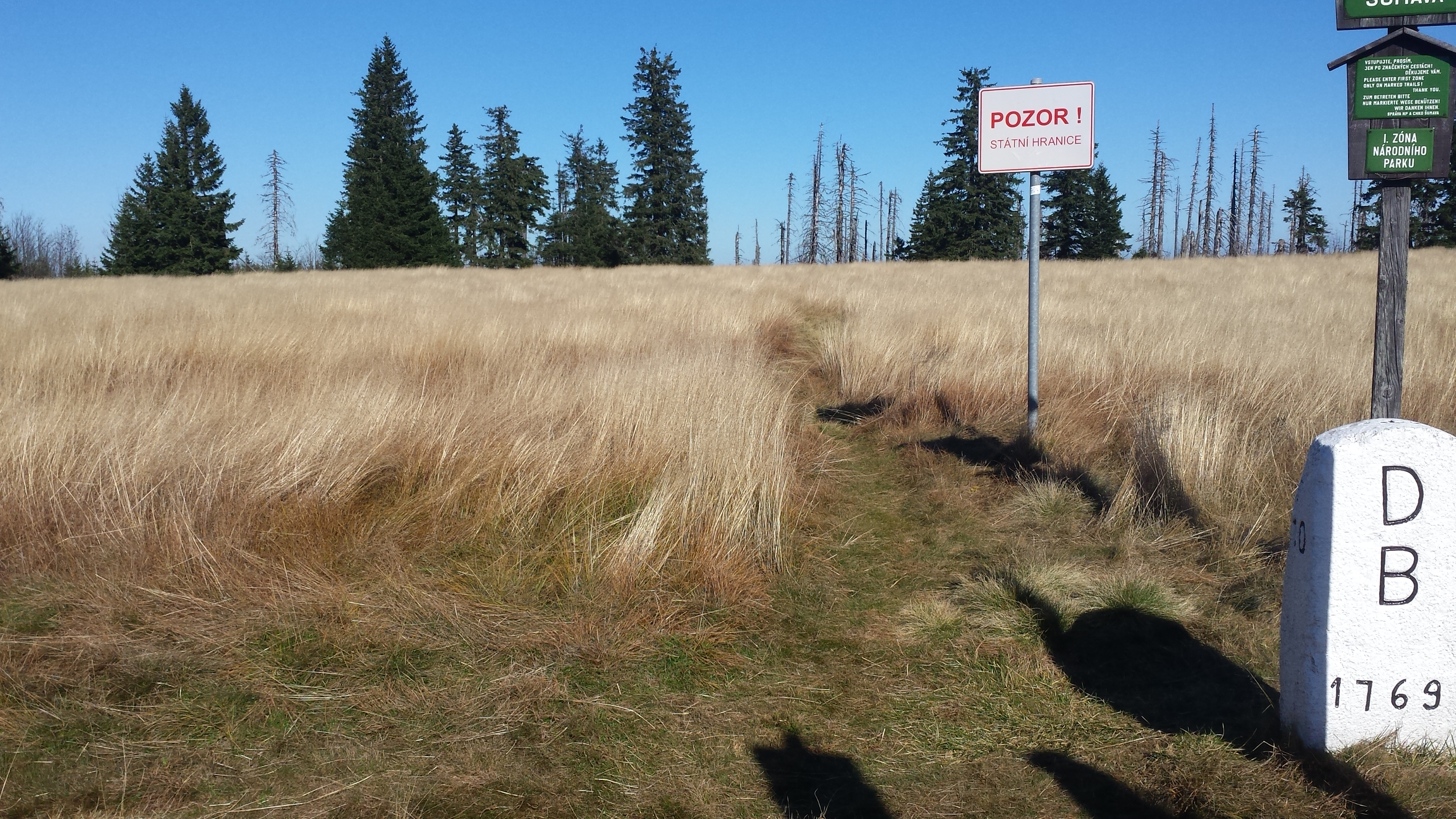

Highest point
- Elevation: 1,337 m (4,386 ft)
- Prominence: 263 m (863 ft)
- Isolation: 14.2 km (8.8 mi)
- Coordinates: 49°06′17″N 13°18′46″E

Geography
- Location: Bavaria, Germany; Czech Republic

Lackenberg (Czech: Plesná or Debrník) is a mountain of the Bavarian Forest (German: Bayerischer Wald) and Bohemian Forest, (Czech: Šumava) on the border between Germany and the Czech Republic.
