= Rukowitzberg =

Mountain in Germany

Coordinates: 49°05′41″N 13°16′57″E

Highest point
- Elevation: 1,269 m (4,163 ft)

Geography
- Location: Bavaria, Germany

Rukowitzberg is a mountain of Bavaria, Germany.
