= Großer Falkenstein =

Mountain in Germany

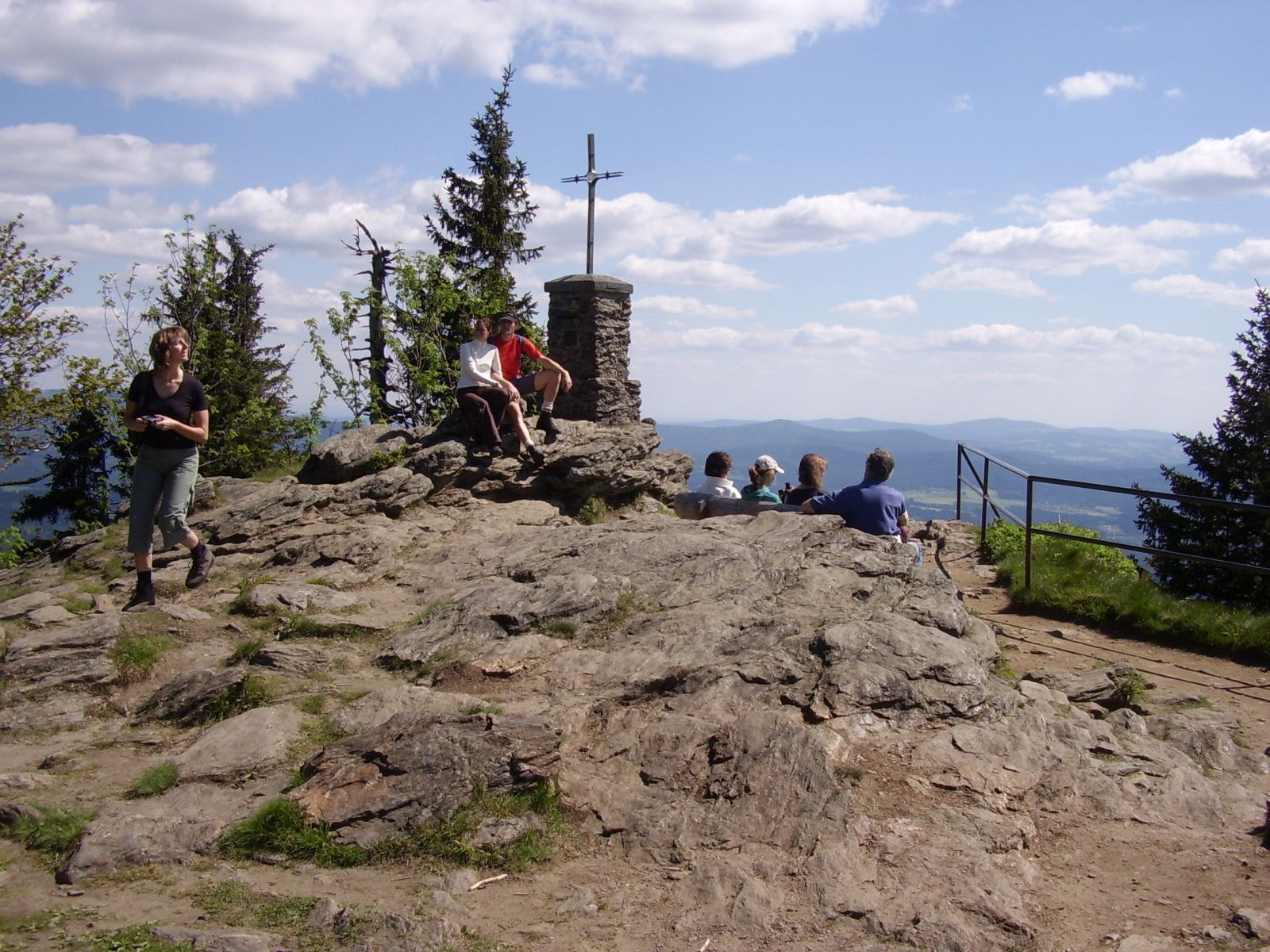

Highest point
- Elevation: 1,315 m (4,314 ft)
- Isolation: 2.3 km → Lackenberg
- Coordinates: 49°5′3″N 13°16′48″E

Geography
- Location within Bavaria
- Location: Bavaria, Germany
- Parent range: Bavarian Forest

Geology
- Rock type: Gneiss

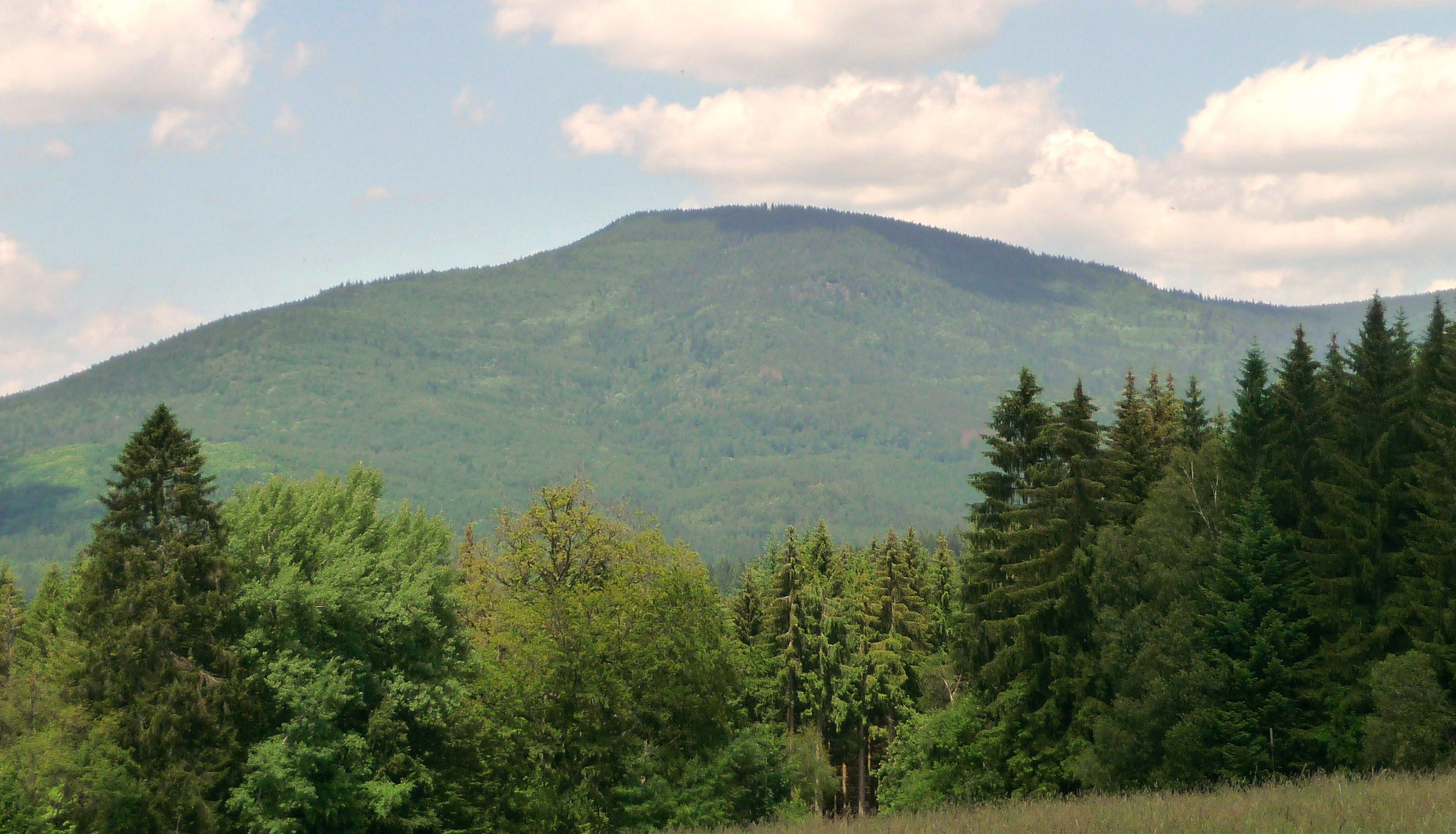
The Großer Falkenstein seen from the Jungmaierhütte

The Großer Falkenstein or Great Falkenstein, is a mountain, 1,315 metres (4,314 ft) high, in the Bavarian Forest about five kilometres southeast of Bayerisch Eisenstein in the Falkenstein-Rachel region of the Bavarian Forest National Park.

== Views ==
From the summit cross there are extensive views to the west and south of the Großer Arber, the Großer Osser, the town of Zwiesel and the Großer Rachel.

To the west and 125 metres (410 ft) lower is the Kleiner Falkenstein, also a worthwhile viewing point.

== Ascent ==
An ascent to the summit is possible in around 2 hours following the trails marked Heidelbeere, Eibe, Silberblatt and Esche from the start points of Zwieslerwaldhaus, Kreuzstraßl and Scheuereck. Worth seeing is the so-called Höllbachgspreng, an area of rocky terrain with a gorge and stream that has several waterfalls and numerous runnels descending to the Höllbachschwelle, a small lake. The path through this area is very challenging and should only be attempted by experienced hikers.

== Mountain hut ==
At the summit is a mountain hut owned by the Zwiesel branch of the Bavarian Forest Club, which is open daily during the summer and at weekends in winter. It has overnight accommodation. The hut, the Falkenstein-Schutzhaus, was built in autumn 1932 to plans by Straubing town architect, Oskar Schmidt, handed over on 7 January 1933 to the public and formally opened on 15 and 16 June 1933 as part of a field mass by the Ludwigsthal parish priest, Maier. At that time it already had 30 bedspaces.

On 12 September 1975, after 2 years of renovation and extension work, the hut was reopened at an event attended by 2,000 people. Since then it has had 60 bedspaces.

In January 2018 the members of the Bavarian Forest Club voted for the demolition and rebuilding of the mountain hut.

== Geotope ==
The summit crag of the Großer Falkenstein has been designated as an important geotope (Geotope no.: 276R022) by the Bavarian State Office for the Environment.
