= Frauenau =

- Municipality
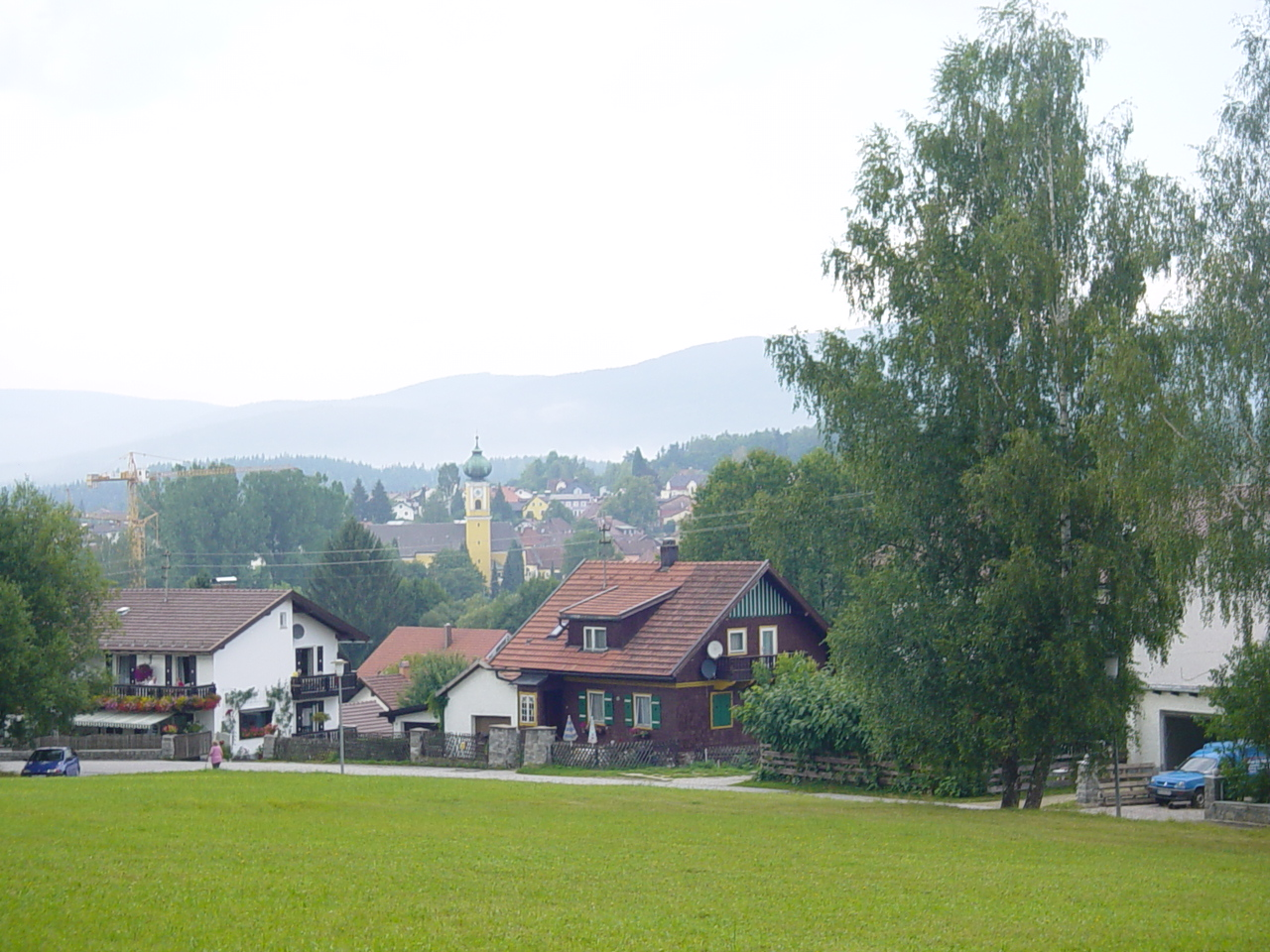
- Frauenau

- Coat of arms

- Location of Frauenau within Regen district
- Interactive map of Frauenau
- Location within Germany Location within Bavaria
- Coordinates: 48°59′N 13°18′E
- Country: Germany
- State: Bavaria
- Admin. region: Niederbayern
- District: Regen

Government
  - Mayor (2020–26): Fritz Schreder

Area
  - Total: 60.14 km^{2} (23.22 sq mi)
- Elevation: 616 m (2,021 ft)

Population (2025-12-31)
  - Total: 2,657
  - Density: 44.18/km^{2} (114.4/sq mi)
- Time zone: UTC+01:00 (CET)
  - Summer (DST): UTC+02:00 (CEST)
- Postal codes: 94258
- Dialling codes: 09926
- Vehicle registration: REG
- Website: www.frauenau.de

Frauenau is a municipality in the district of Regen, in Bavaria, Germany. It is known for its artificial lake, which is used as a water supply of the area around Deggendorf and Passau.

== See also ==
- Church of the Assumption of the Blessed Virgin Mary, Frauenau
