= Großer Rachel =

Mountain in Germany

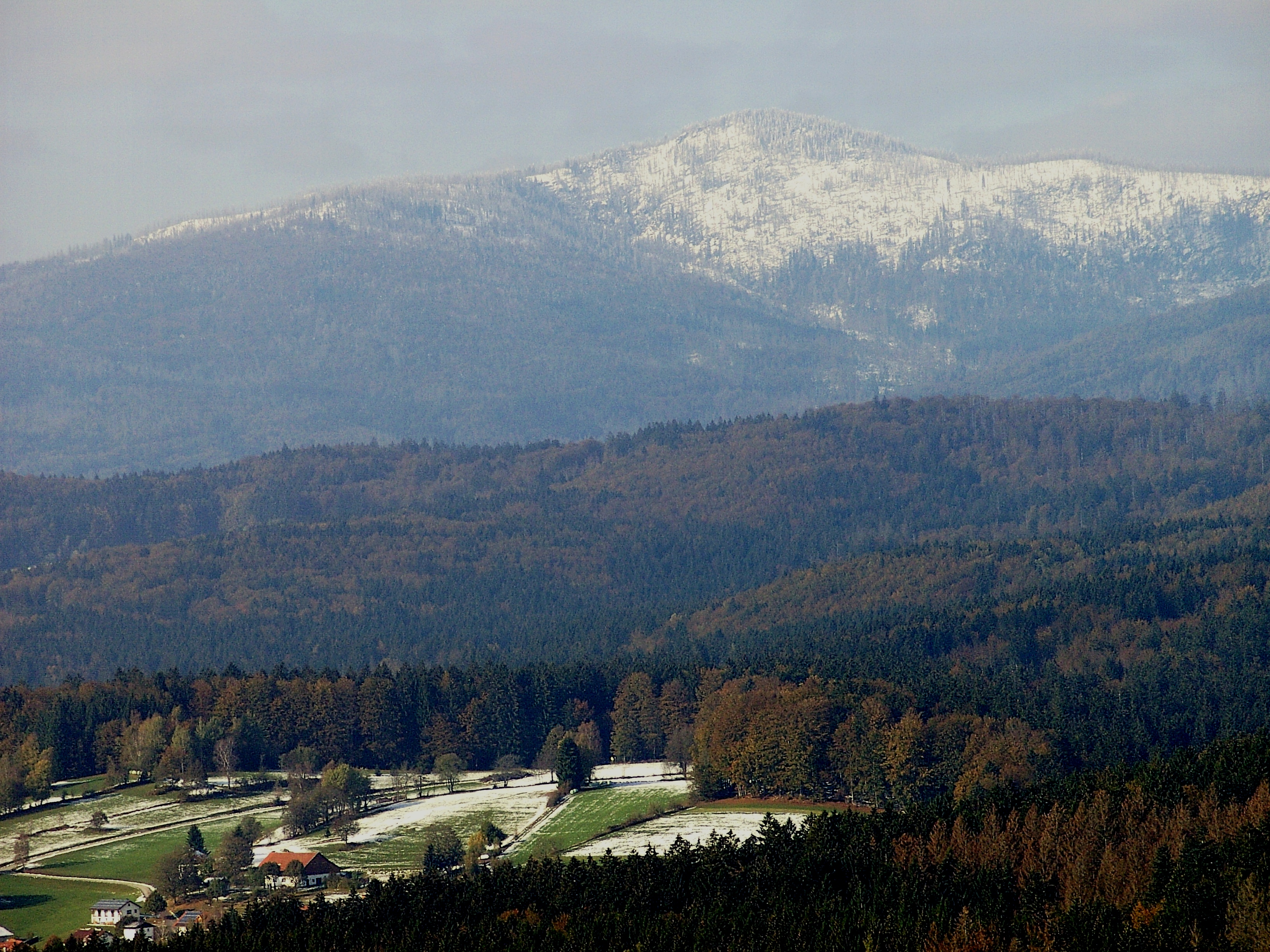
- The Großer Rachel in the autumn

Highest point
- Elevation: 1,452 m above sea level (NHN) (4,764 ft)
- Prominence: 496 m ↓ S of Nový Brunst
- Isolation: 23.8 km → Großer Arber
- Coordinates: 48°58′42″N 13°23′22″E

Geography
- Location within Bavaria
- Location: Regen, Freyung-Grafenau, Lower Bavaria
- Parent range: Bavarian Forest

Geology
- Rock type: gneiss

The Großer Rachel or Great Rachel is a mountain, 1,452 m above sea level (NHN); it is the second highest summit in the Bavarian Forest and Bohemian Forest after the Großer Arber and the highest mountain in the Bavarian Forest National Park. Together with the Kleiner Rachel or Little Rachel, 900 metres to the northwest, it forms the mountain of Rachel (Czech: Roklan).

== Description ==
On its rocky summit stands an impressive wooden cross and a Bergwacht (mountain rescue) hut. The panorama extends from the Osser and Arber to the northwest to the Dreisesselberg to the southeast; when there are föhn winds or temperature inversion conditions, the chain of the Alps can be seen from the Totes Gebirge to the Zugspitze. However, recently this all-round view is being obscured by the growth of spruce in the summit region. The Great Rachel is a popular destination. Walkers can stop at the Waldschmidthaus below the summit and order food and drink; since 2011 it has not been possible to overnight here due to fire regulations.

As on the neighbouring Lusen, large parts of the Rachel forest fell victim to bark beetle in 1995. According to the thinking of the National Park authorities, no defensive measures were taken nor were dead trees removed. Instead, nature was left to itself and instead of the former, monotonous spruce forests, mixed forest is returning.

Southeast of the summit is the lake of Rachelsee, about 400 metres below. The Rachel Chapel is also situated on the slopes of the mountain. To the north-east of the mountain in the Czech Republic, in the Rachel Forest (Roklanský les) lie the source areas of the Little Regen and the Great Müllerbach/Roklanský potok.

The Rachel is the local mountain of Frauenau and Spiegelau. Its summit can only be reached on foot. Mountain bikes are not allowed on the trails. The shortest way is from the Gfäll car park to the summit in 1 1/2 hours. Further starting points are Oberfrauenau, the railway station at Klingenbrunn and the Racheldienst Hut car park. Access to the two car parks mentioned is closed from 15 May to 2 November between 8 am and 6 pm and they can then only be reached by the buses of the Regional Bus Ostbayern. In winter, the mountain can often only be climbed with touring skis or snowshoes because of the metre-high snow. A direct ascent from the Czech side is no longer possible, as the traditional starting point, the Rachel Hut (Roklanská hájenka) is in the core zone of the Bohemian Forest National Park and thus out-of-bounds.

== Geotope ==
The summit crags of the Großer Rachel are designated as an important geotope by the Bavarian State Office for the Environment (Geotope no.: 276R029).

== Panoramas ==
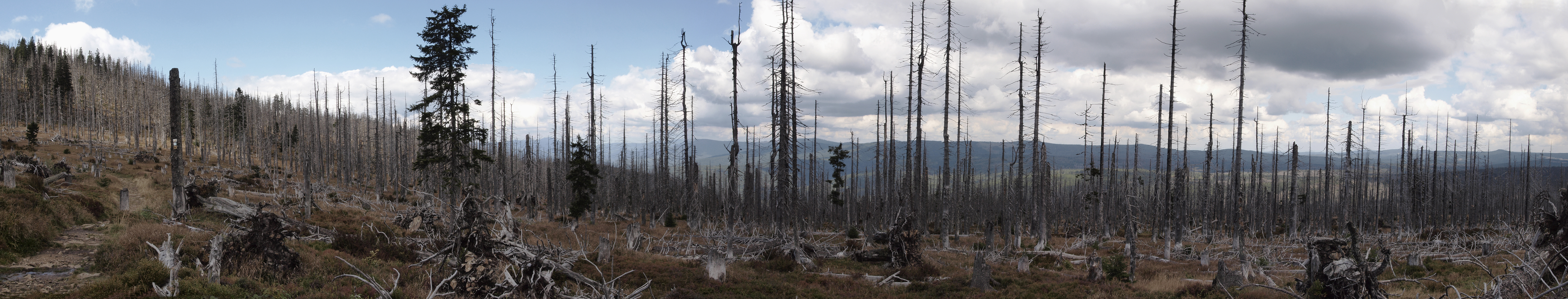
The eastern side of the Großer Rachel
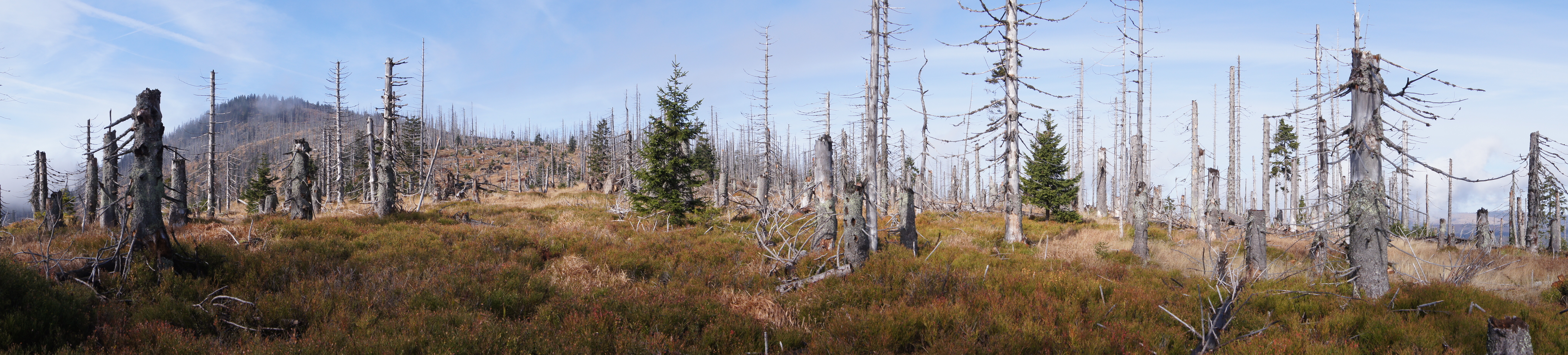
View of the eastern side of the Rachel

== Gallery ==
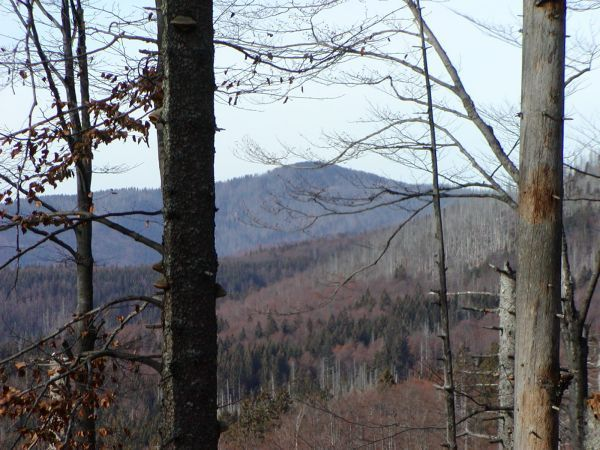
View of the Großer Rachel

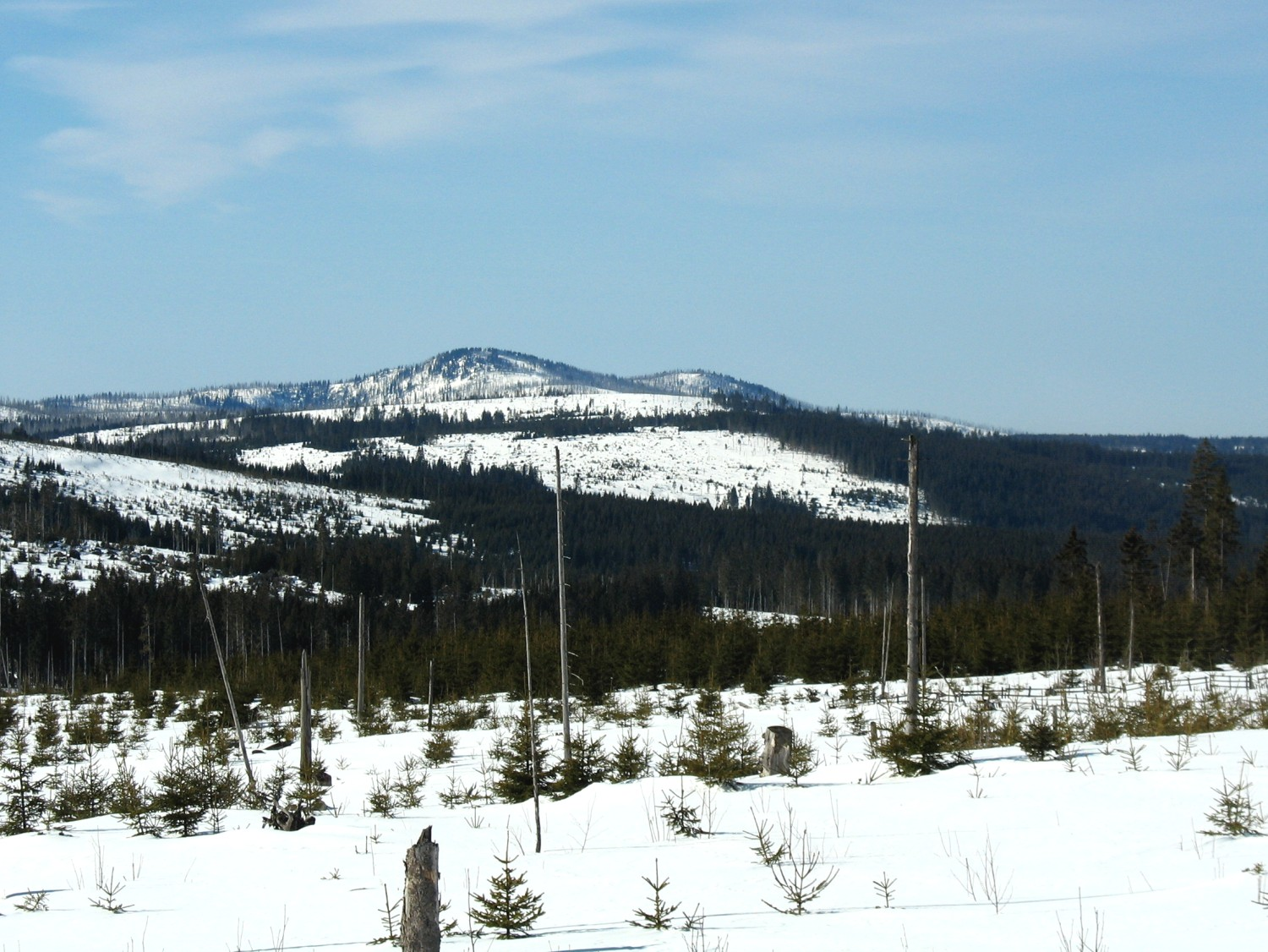
View of the Rachel from the Černá hora

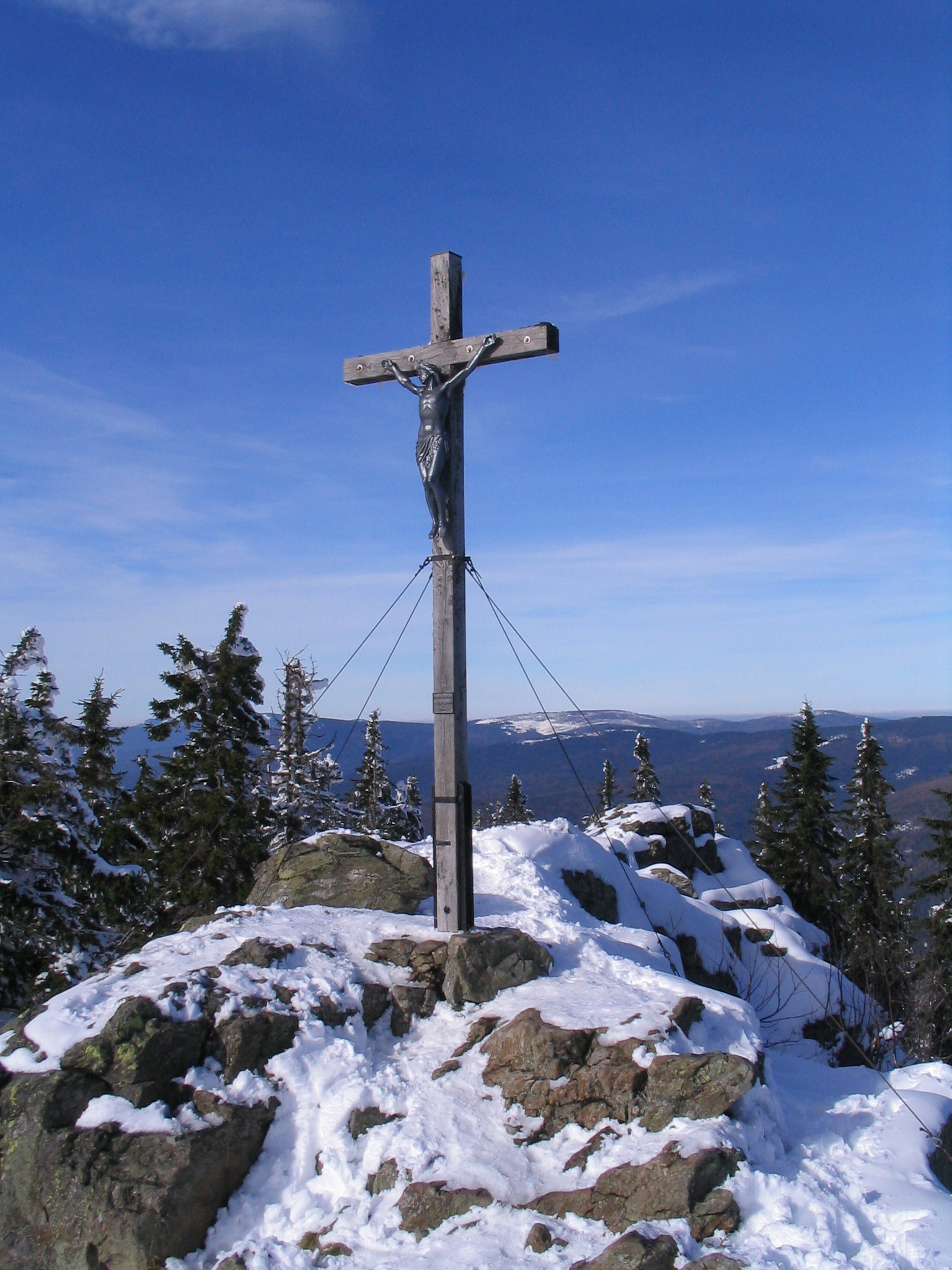
Summit cross of the Großer Rachel

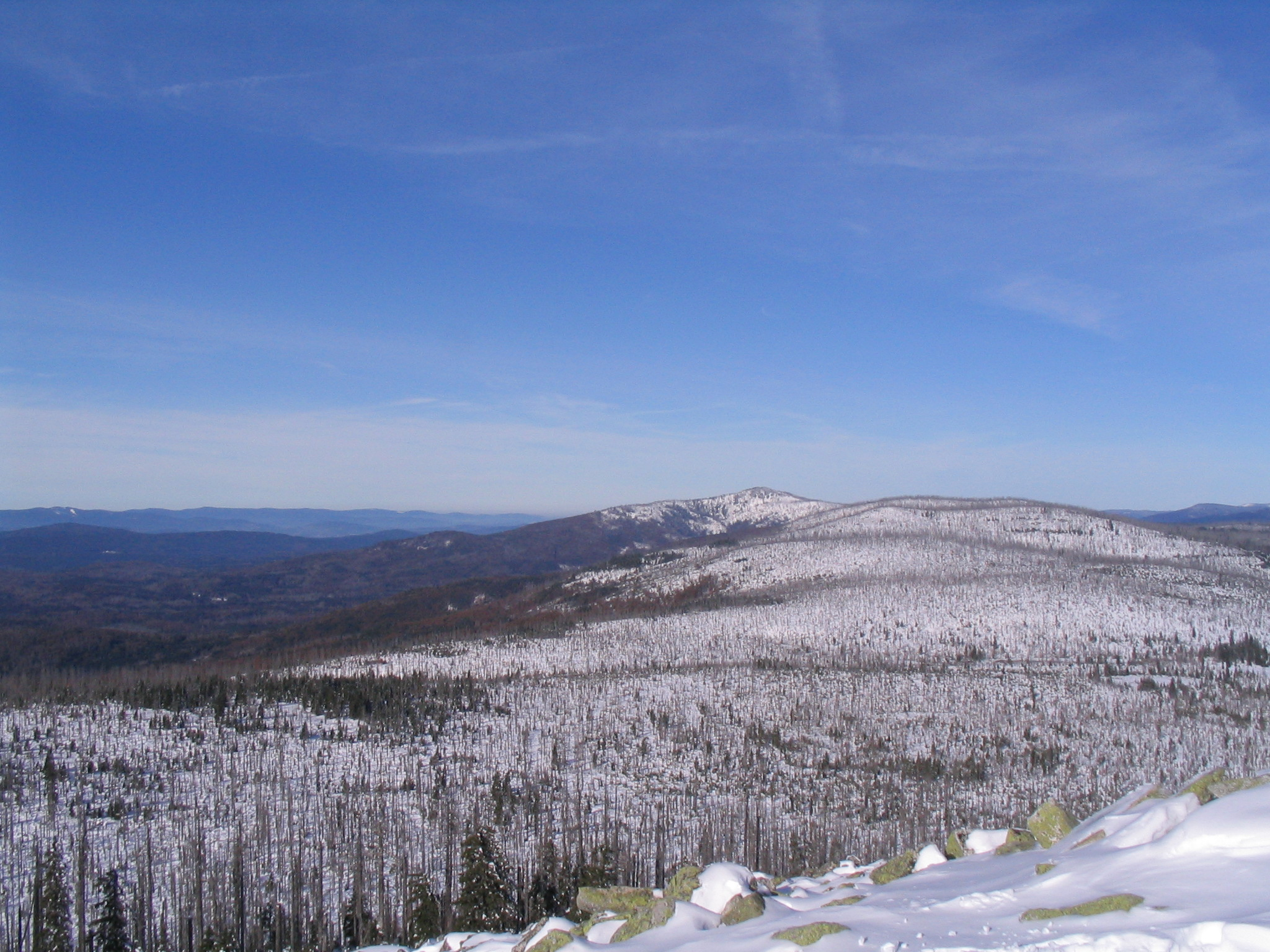
View from Lusen of the Großer Rachel
