= Flinzbach =

River in Germany

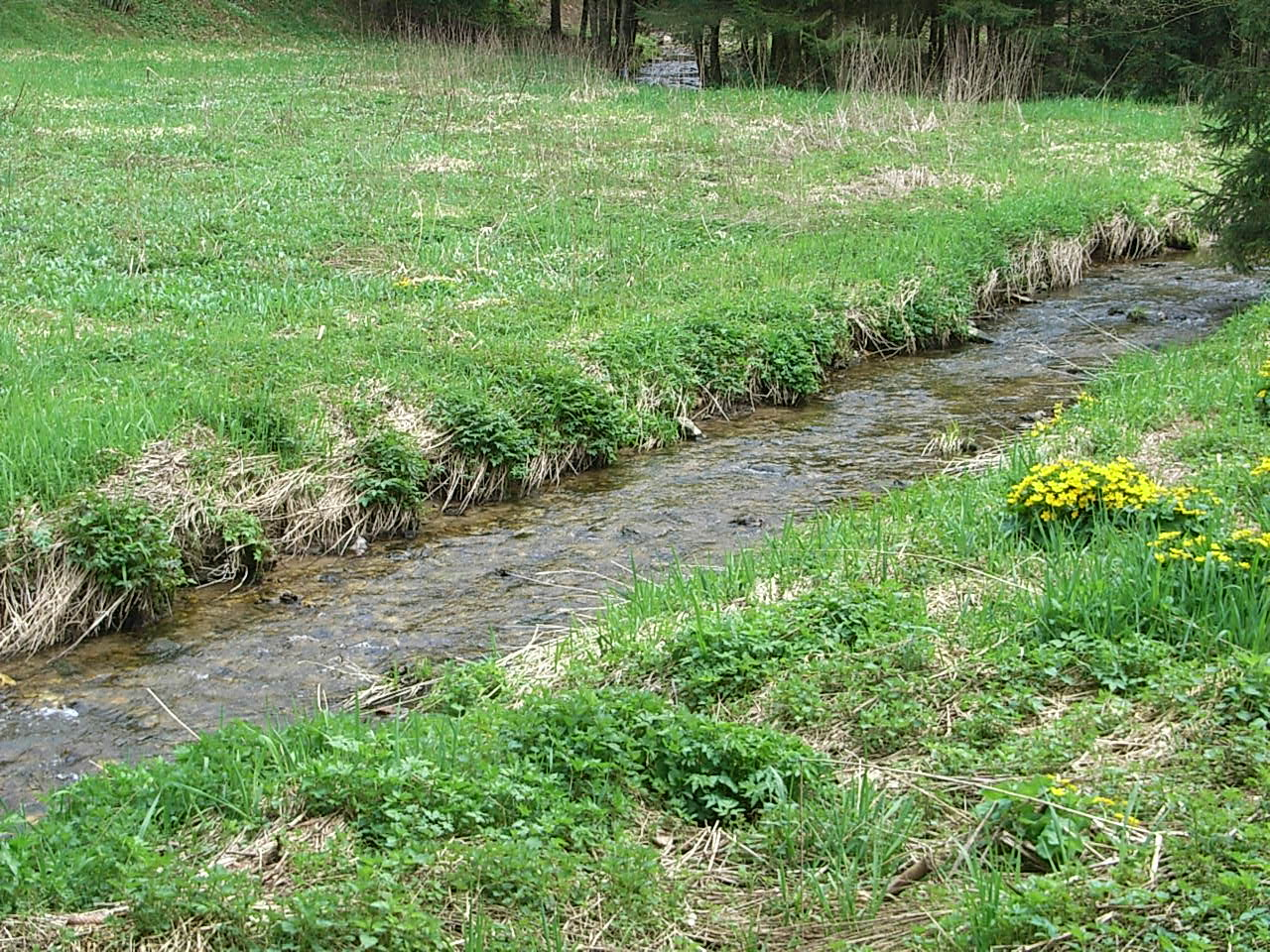
- The Flinzbach at Kaikenried (a part of Teisnach)

Location
- Country: Germany
- State: Bavaria

Physical characteristics
- Mouth
  - location: Teisnach
  - coordinates: 49.0175°N 12.9947°E

Basin features
- Progression: Teisnach→ Regen→ Danube→ Black Sea

Flinzbach is a river of Bavaria, Germany. It flows into the Teisnach near Patersdorf.

== See also ==
- List of rivers of Bavaria
