= Weißenstein Castle (Lower Bavaria) =

Castle in Lower Bavaria, Germany

Ruine Weißenstein
- Weißenstein
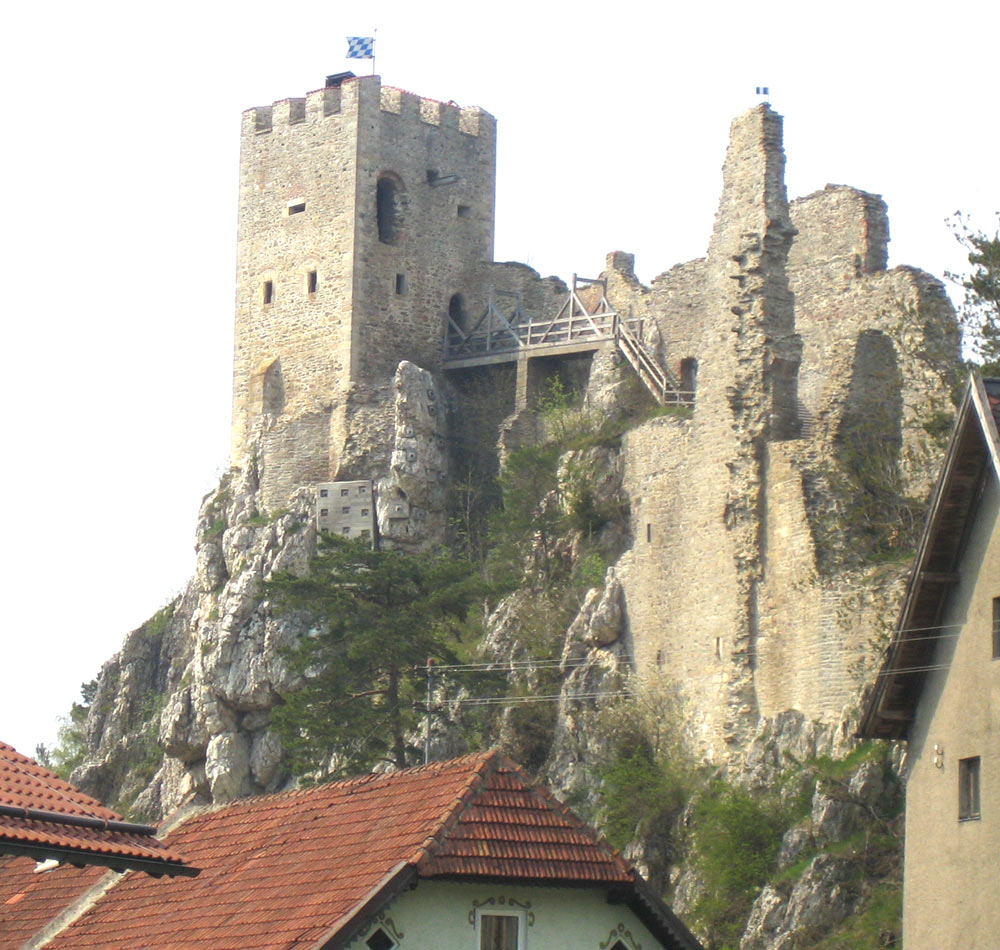
- The ruins of Weißenstein – view of the southeast corner of the tower house and adjacent curtain wall

Site information
- Type: hill castle, rock location
- Code: DE-BY
- Condition: ruin

Location
- Coordinates: 48°57′3.24″N 13°8′29.04″E
- Height: 758 m above sea level (NN)

Site history
- Built: c. 1100

Garrison information
- Occupants: counts

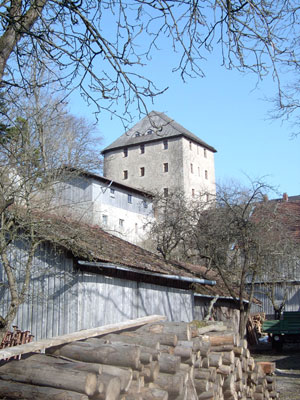
The Fressende Haus

Weißenstein Castle (German: Burgruine Weißenstein) is a ruined rock castle at a height of 758 metres on a quartz ridge, the Pfahl ("Burgberg") in the municipality of Weißenstein in the borough of Regen in the county of Regen in Bavaria.

== History ==
The castle was built around 1100 by the counts of Bogen. After this dynasty died out in 1242, the castle fell to the Duke of Bavaria. In 1308, the Bavarian Duke Otto and Stephen of Lower Bavaria enfeoffed Lord Eberwein of Degenberg with the castle. In 1339/40, the castle became the property of the Degenbergs.

When the Degenbergs rose up against Duke Albert IV, in the Böckler War, ducal troops under George of Lerchenfeld appeared in front of the castle on 9 December 1468. Shortly before Christmas, Weißenstein Castle was captured and burned down. However, the Degenbergs rebuilt it and remained here until their extinction in 1602 when Hans Sigmund of Degenberg died.

The castle fell to Elector Maximilian I who established the seat of the electoral Pfleger here. In 1633, during the Thirty Years' War, the castle was ravaged by the Swedish. In 1740, the south side of the castle collapsed, in 1742 Franz von der Trenck and his Pandurs finally destroyed the castle.

Since then, the castle has been in ruins, while the official residence and farm buildings have been restored. In 1762 a tower-like building was added, which also served as the so-called a "grain box" for the tithes of the subjects. In 1918, the writers, Clara Nordstrom and Siegfried von Vegesack, bought the house and made it their home. They would rent out rooms to artists and tourists. They called it Das Fressende Haus ("The House that Eats"), due to its high costs. This is also the title of his novel published in 1932.

== Description ==
The ruin, an elongated complex on a rock terrace, is separated from its domestic buildings. Besides some masonry, the square tower house has survived. The castle ruins of Weißenstein have been owned by the town of Regen since 1996. From 1991 to 1995 the ruin was renovated and is now accessible to the public.

Since 1985, the Fressende Haus has housed a museum and literary archive on the poet, Siegfried von Vegesack. In addition, sacred art, equipment for flax and linen production and a large collection of snuff are exhibited here. Occasionally poetry readings and other events take place here.

Below the ruins is an 1836 chapel with a baroque altar and numerous votive tablets.

== Nature reserve ==
The Pfahl Nature Reserve near the Ruins of Weissenstein (Naturschutzgebiet Pfahl bei der Ruine Weißenstein) was created by the governments of Lower Bavaria and Upper Palatinate on 18 April 1940 (RegAnz. Ausg. 112/114). It covers an area of 6 hectares and extends over the rocky area including the ruins. This measure prevents all quarrying of quartz on the Pfahl. The castle hill is more densely covered in trees than the rest of the Pfahl due to centuries of fertilisation with waste. Sycamore, elder, birch and ash thrive here.

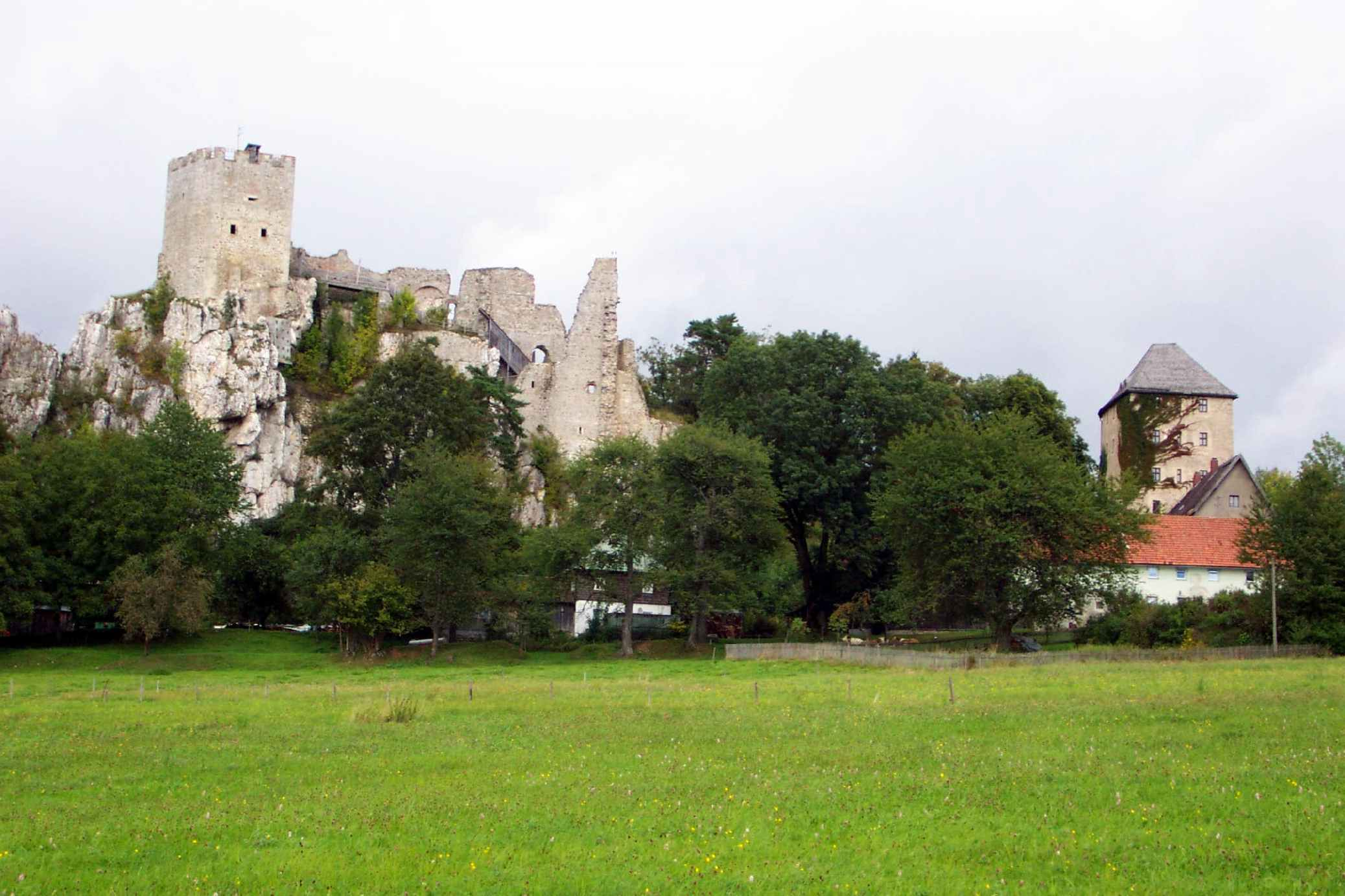
View of the ruins from the south

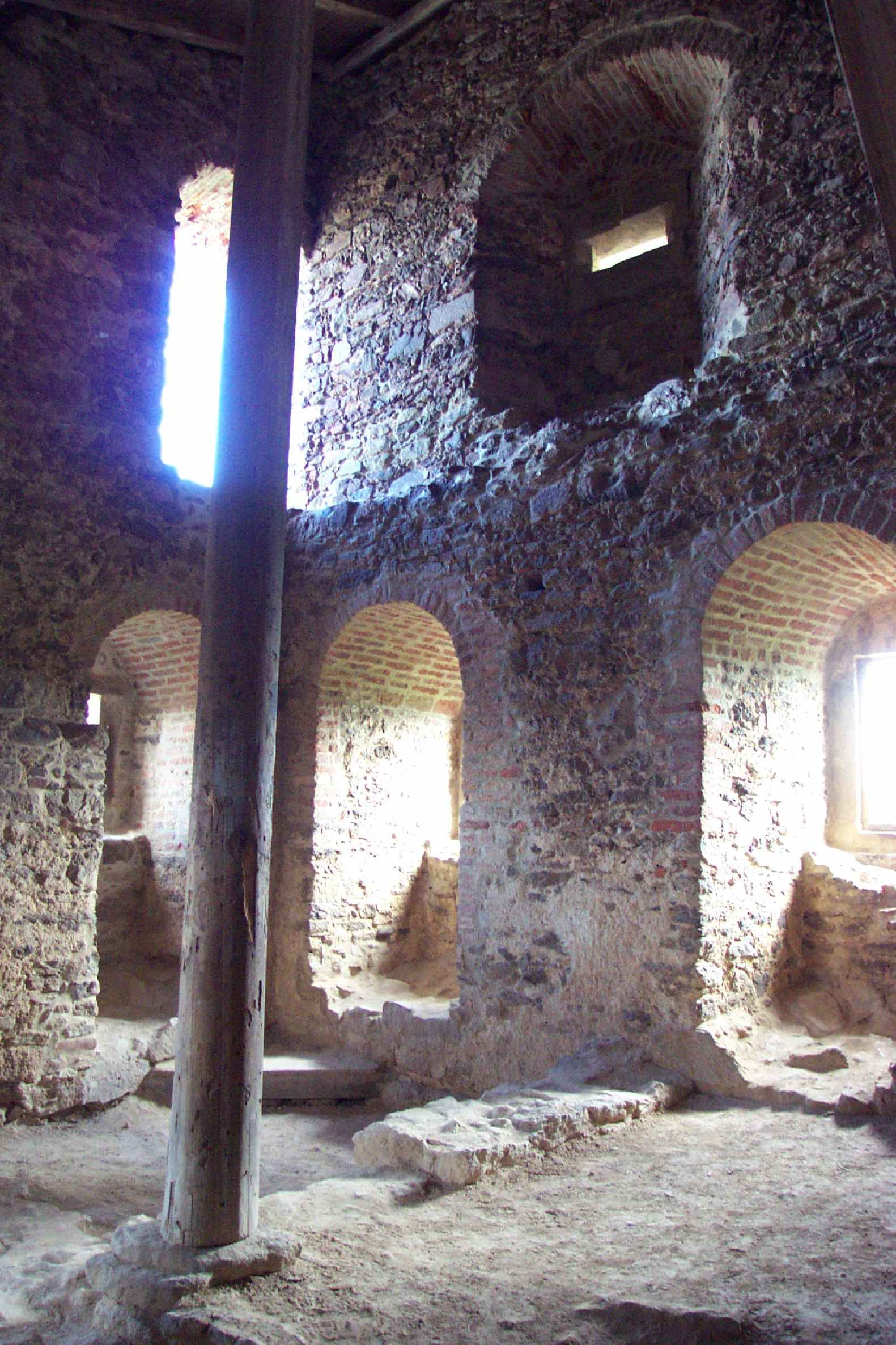
Inside the tower house

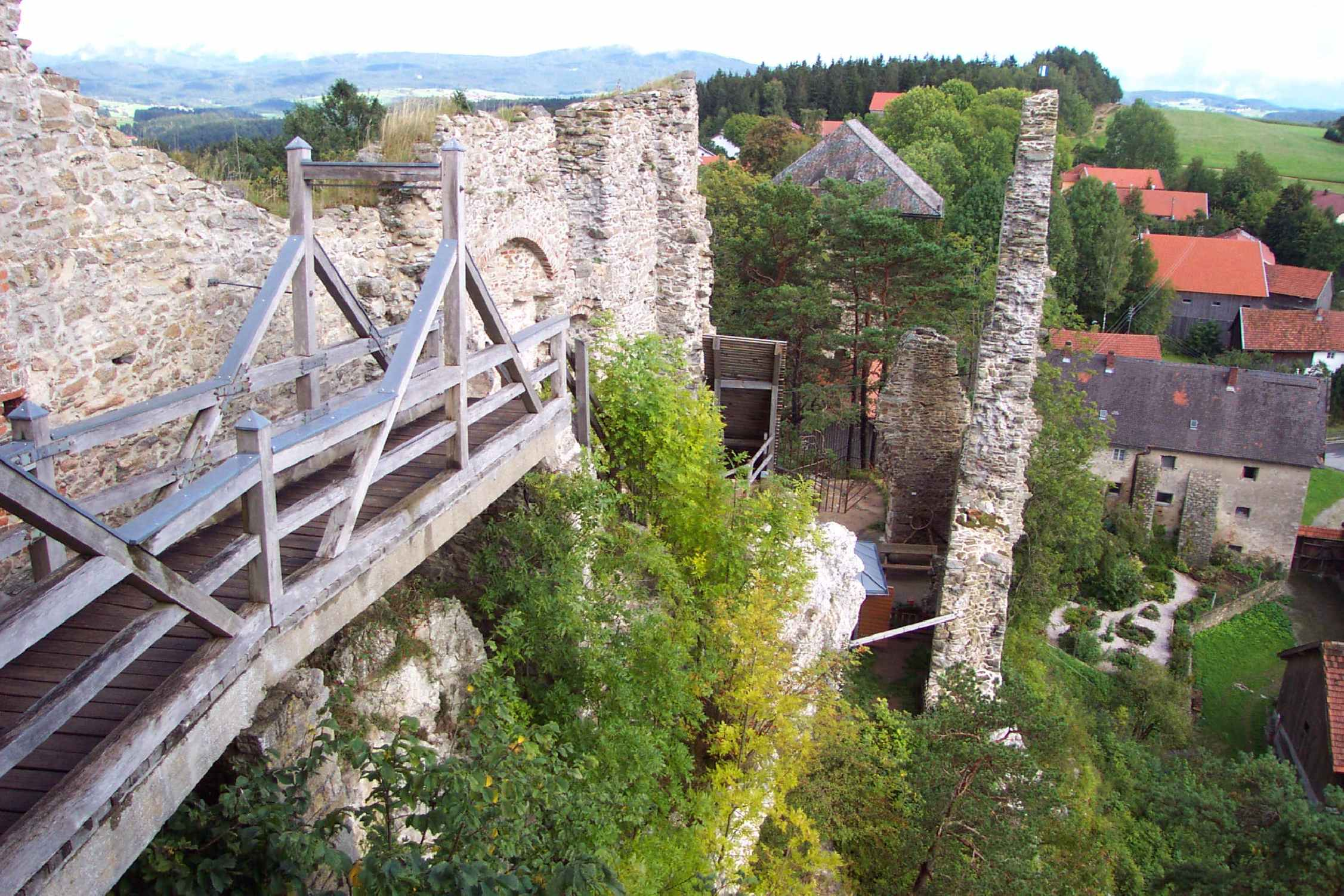
View from the tower house of the ruins

== Legend ==
According to a legend, a knight's wife wanted to drown her seven newborn children. The knight returned and prevented this and had his children raised in Rinchnach Monastery, but did not tell his wife. The children returned to the castle as grown men. When the lord of the castle asked what should happen to a person who had his or her own children killed, his wife replied that the person should be walled in alive. Thereupon she was walled in and is still to be seen today as a "white woman" in the ruins.
