= Pfahl (Bavarian Forest) =

Coordinates: 49°05′2″N 12°51′36″E

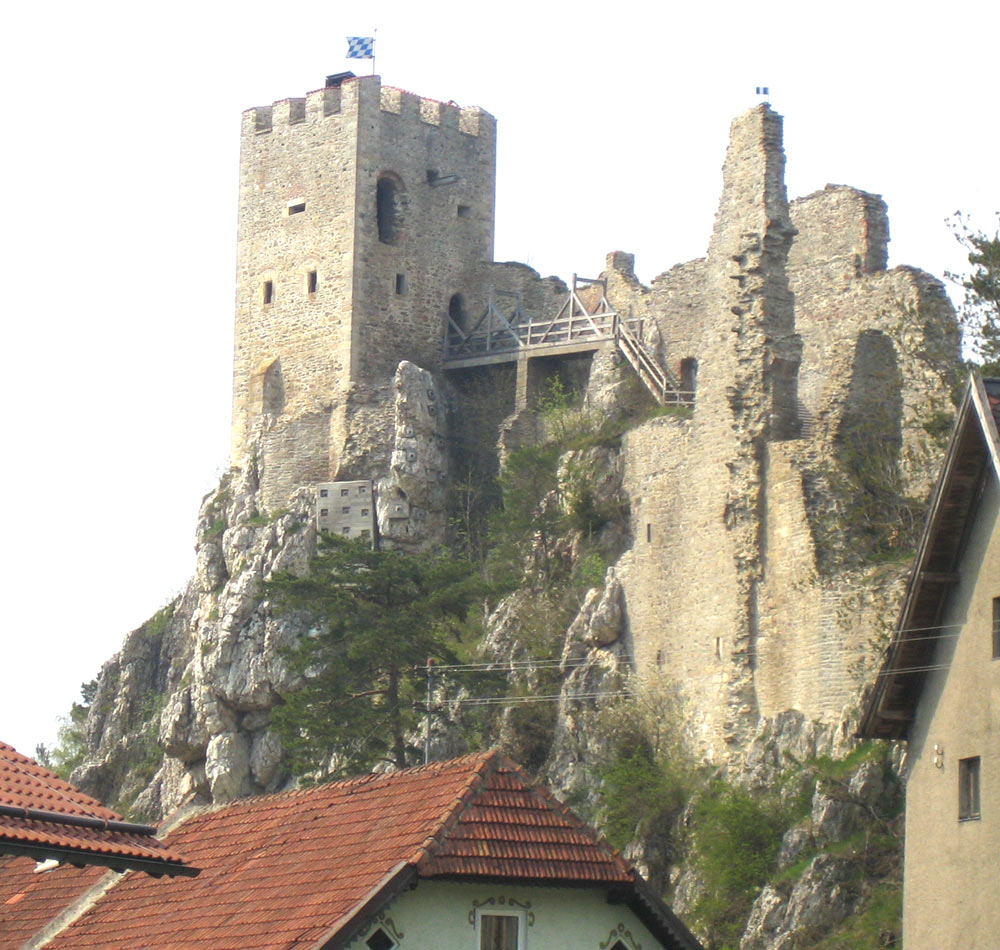
Ruins of Weißenstein Castle, built on the Pfahl

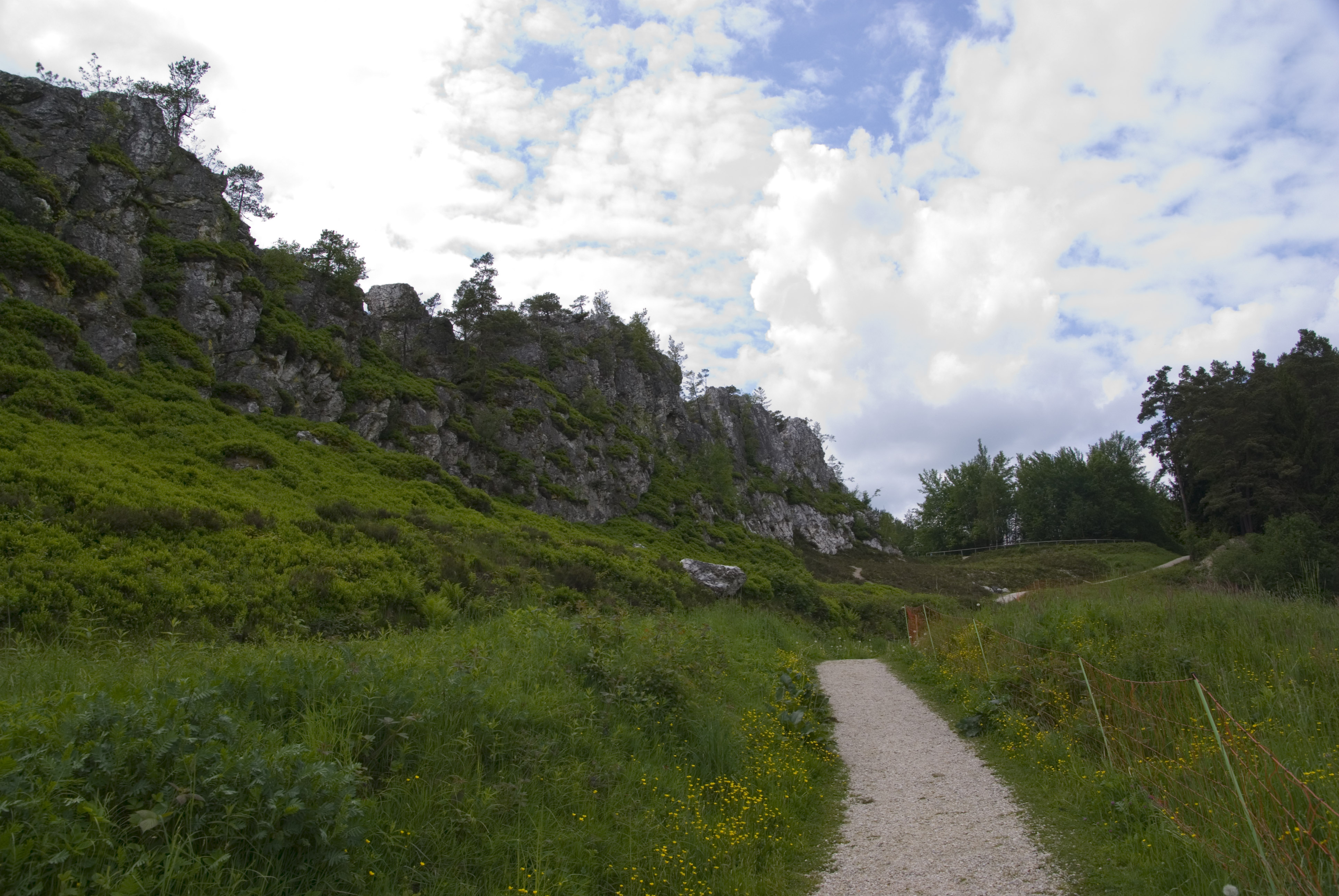
The Pfahl near Viechtach

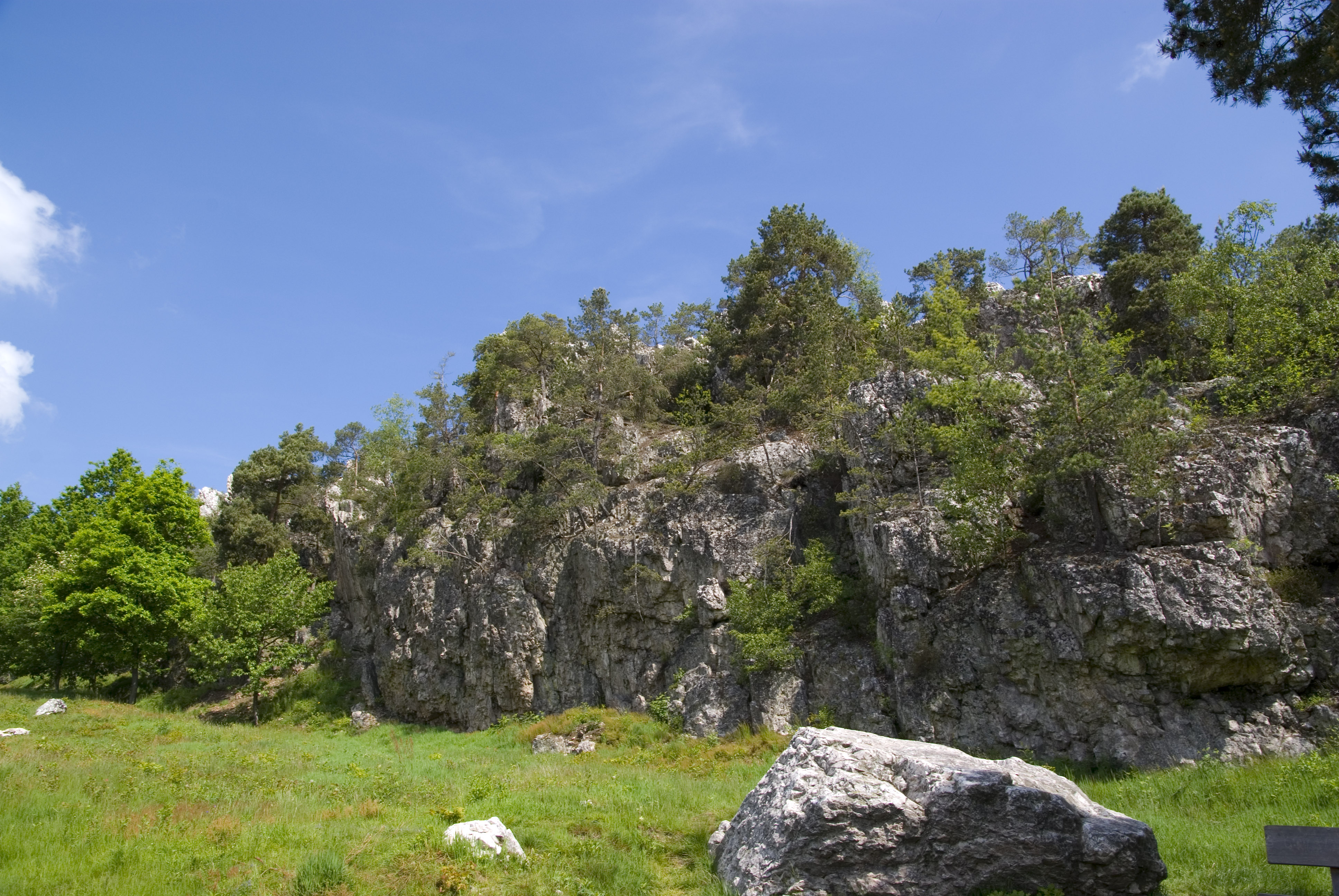
The Pfahl near Viechtach

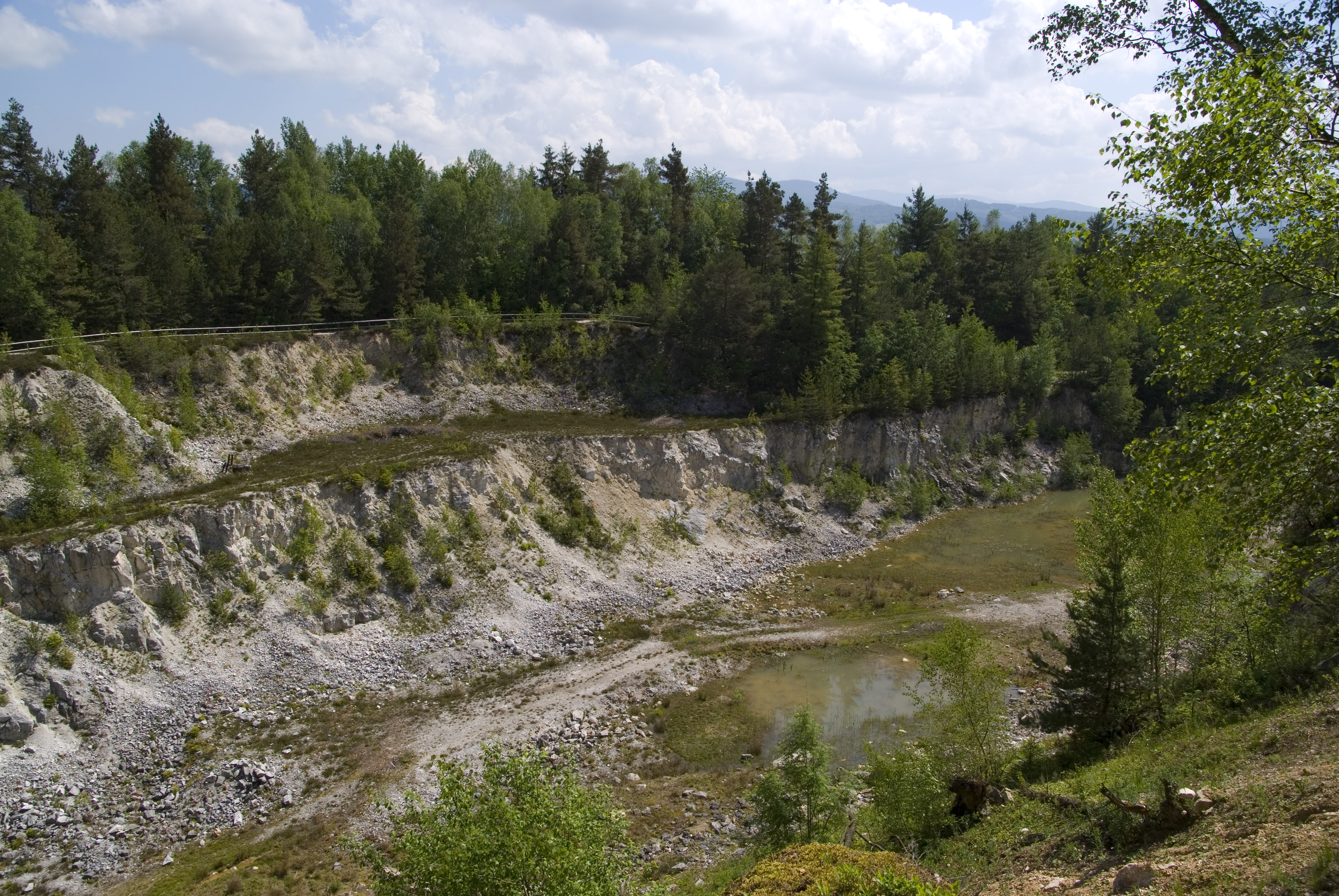
Quartz quarry on the Pfahl near Viechtach

The Pfahl is a 150-kilometre-long quartz vein that runs through the northeastern Bavarian Forest in Germany. From a geomorphological point of view, it represents a residual ridge that has been formed by weathering and erosion over millions of years.

== Formation ==
The Pfahl consists of quartz that was deposited as a hydrothermal vein about 275 million years ago within the existing fault structure. The Pfahl was probably active as a fault several times. Because the rock of the Pfahl was harder than the surrounding rock, it was left standing like a wall as softer rocks were eroded. Today the Pfahl forms a residual ridge 150 kilometres long and 10 to 40 metres high. The shining white quartz of the Pfahl consists of up to 98% silicic acid; any yellowish to reddish or grey coloration is caused by iron compounds and impurities (Pfahlschiefer). The interpretation of the actual Pfahl fault as a suture is disputed; but it has been confirmed that it separates various magmatic rocks.

== Course ==
The Pfahl begins in the northwest in the Upper Palatinate, southeast of Schwarzenfeld, passes the town of Cham to the southwest and runs in a southeasterly direction via Viechtach, Regen, Grafenau and Freyung and into Upper Austria's Mühlviertel. The quartz only outcrops in a few places (and not at all southeast of Freyung); otherwise the Pfahl is only recognisable as a ridge. In Weißenstein near Regen it reaches a height of 758 metres above sea level; on this summit stand the ruins of Weißenstein Castle. The quartz formations are most easily visible near Viechtach (west of the town) and here they rise up to 30 metres above the ground. With a few exceptions the Pfahl has survived as a continuous geological formation.

Through the Zellertal valley between Bad Kötzting and Bodenmais another Pfahl-like slate zone runs parallel to the actual Pfahl and in which the quartz does not immediately outcrop. This 'secondary pfahl' is called the Rundingen Pfahl Zone (Rundinger-Pfahlzone). Its southeastern outcrop lies near Bettmannsäge southwest of Zwiesel. There is another secondary pfahl in the southeast of the Bavarian Forest, the Aicha-Hals Secondary Pfahl (Aicha-Halser-Nebenpfahl), which is responsible for the double bend on the Ilz near Hals as well as a bend in the River Danube to the north just behind Passau. There is yet another one between Kirchberg vorm Wald and Gerlesberg.

== Natural region divisions ==
The longest section of the Pfahl runs through the Regen Depression. Here there are several, individual, southeast-running residual ridges that are repeatedly interrupted by basins and transverse valleys. From a natural regional perspective, the Pfahl is divided into the following sub-divisions as follows (from NW to SE):

- to 404 Regen Depression (Regensenke)
  - 404.2 Pfahl
    - 404.25 Thierlstein Pfahl (Thierlsteiner Pfahl), SW of Cham; on the main chain up to 448.9 m, on its southwest uplands up to 469.9 m
    - 404.24 Moosbach Pfahl (Moosbacher Pfahl), up to 639 m
    - 404.23 Viechtach Pfahl (Viechtacher Pfahl), up to 583 m
    - 404.22 Patersdorf Pfahl (Patersdorfer Pfahl), up to 648 m
    - 404.21 March Pfahl (Marcher Pfahl), on its southwest highlands up to 784.6 m
    - 404.20 Weissenstein Pfahl (Weißensteiner Pfahl), at Weißenstein Castle 758 m

Southeast and on the far side of the Regen Depression, in the Abteiland, the sections of the Pfahl are geomorphologically less obvious and do not form their own natural regions. One notable geotope there is the Buchberger Leite.

=== National geotope ===
In 2006 the Pfahl was added to the list of 77 outstanding national geotopes in Germany.

== Literature ==
- Bayerisches Landesamt für Umwelt: Ein Bild von einer Störung! Großer Pfahl. In: Hundert Meisterwerke - Die schönsten Geotope Bavarias, Augsburg, 2012, ISBN 978-3-936385-89-2, pp. 72f.
