= Bauernhausmuseum Lindberg =

Coordinates: 49.0355°N 13.2522°E

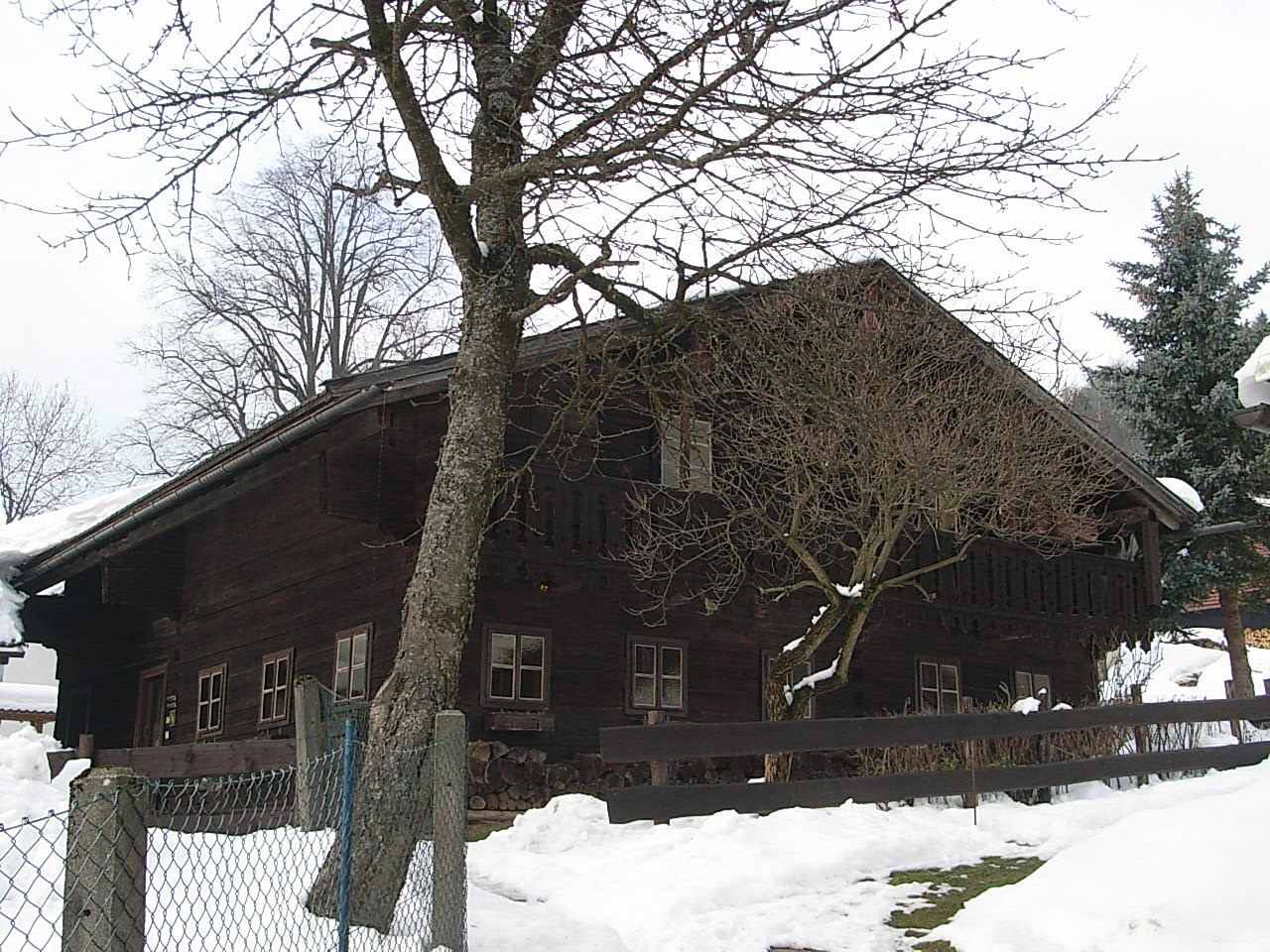
- Lindberg, Farmhouse Museum. Kuchlerhof farmstead (17th century) from south-east.
- Location: Lindberg, Germany
- Type: Open-air museum

The Bauernhausmuseum (Farmhouse Museum) is an open-air museum located in the village of Lindberg in Germany. It consists of three buildings: the museum house, the "Zur Bärenhöhle" inn and the chapel.

It is the only open-air museum in Lower Bavaria, which can be visited at its original, centuries-old square. Both houses were not disassembled, not transported, not reassembled, but were inhabited until 1974.

The museum consists of ten exhibition rooms. Four are on the ground floor, four on the upper floor, the attached stable and the ground above the stable.

The two large rooms show changing exhibitions.

The chapel on the museum grounds is one of the last wooden chapels in the Bavarian Forest. The wood of the chapel comes from a single tree trunk

One of the few glass bells in the Bavarian Forest is hanging in the tower.

Inside the chapel, old votive panels adorn the walls.

The caplet is two-armed and shows St. Sebastian on the left and St. Leonhard on the right. On the shingled outer wall of the chapel there are many old tombstones.

The museum chapel is consecrated; services, baptisms and weddings can be celebrated there. An old Bavarian inn, "Zur Bärenhöhle", is located in the old mining house and is part of the museum.

In 1831, the then owner, Bernhard Gschwendner, was given permission to sell the extraction house and almost two hectares of land.

Until 1974 this building was operated as a secondary agricultural activity.

Today, in three old rooms and the beer garden under shaded trees, the inn offers enough space for a cozy stop before, during or after the visit to the museum.
