= Achslach =

- Municipality
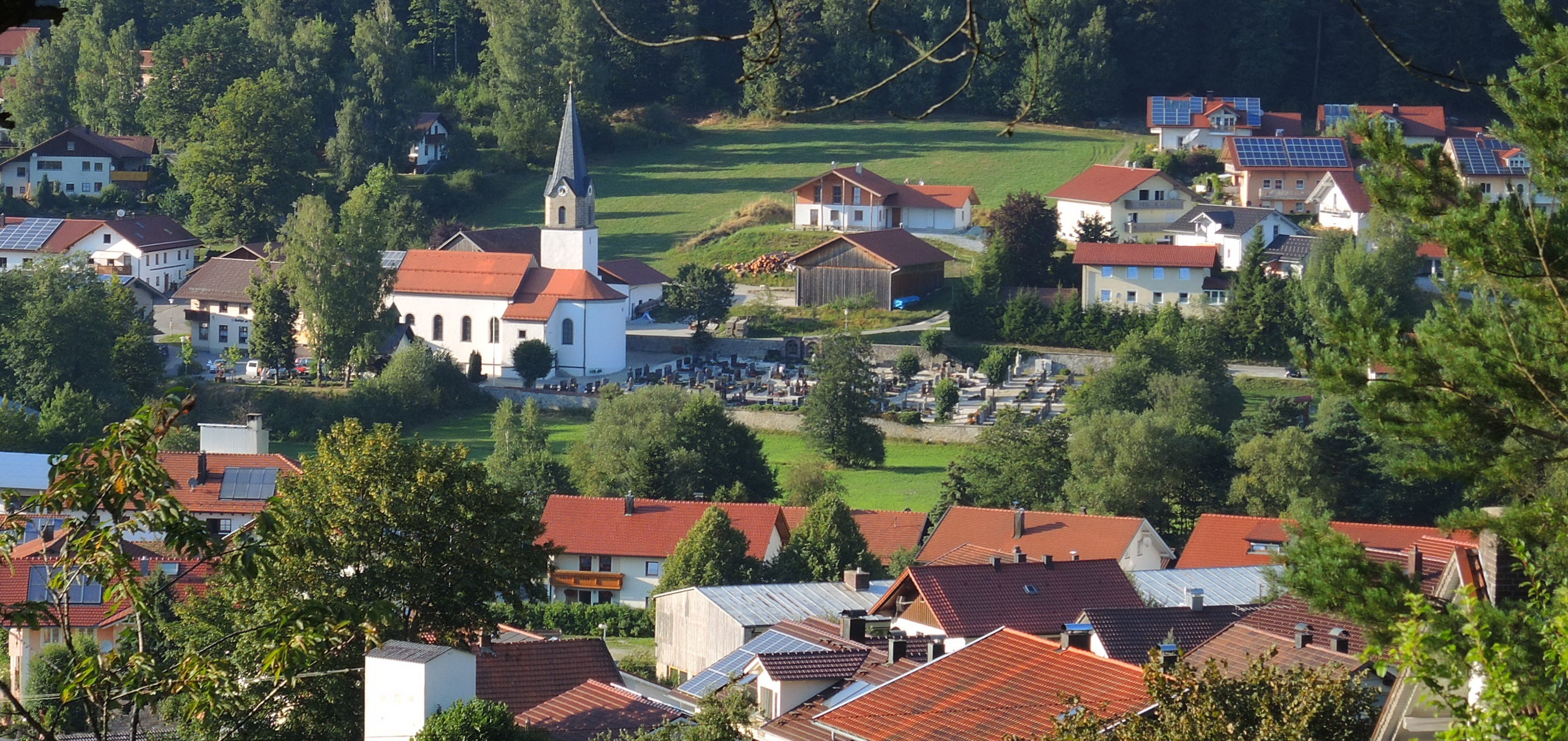
- Achslach

- Coat of arms

- Location of Achslach within Regen district
- Interactive map of Achslach
- Location within Germany Location within Bavaria
- Coordinates: 48°58′N 12°56′E
- Country: Germany
- State: Bavaria
- Admin. region: Niederbayern
- District: Regen
- Municipal assoc.: Ruhmannsfelden

Government
  - Mayor (2020–26): Gabriele Wittenzellner

Area
  - Total: 30.05 km^{2} (11.60 sq mi)
- Elevation: 600 m (2,000 ft)

Population (2025-12-31)
  - Total: 957
  - Density: 31.8/km^{2} (82.5/sq mi)
- Time zone: UTC+01:00 (CET)
  - Summer (DST): UTC+02:00 (CEST)
- Postal codes: 94250
- Dialling codes: 09929
- Vehicle registration: REG
- Website: www.achslach.de

Achslach (Bavarian: Oxla) is a municipality in the district of Regen in Bavaria in Germany.

== Population development ==
- 1840: 956
- 1900: 955
- 1939: 965
- 1950: 1180
- 1970: 1024
- 1991: 1241
- 2005: 1080
- 2015: 902
