= Eck (brewery) =

German brewery

Brauerei Gasthof ECK
- Interactive map of Brauerei Gasthof ECK
- Location: Eck 1, Böbrach, Bavaria, Germany
- Coordinates: 49°3′6″N 13°1′50″E
- Opened: 1462
- Key people: Gerd Schönberger
- Annual production volume: 1,000 hectolitres (850 US bbl)
- Website: brauerei-eck.de

Brauerei Gasthof ECK is a traditional brewery in Böbrach, Bavaria, Germany

== History ==
The Hof zu Eck was mentioned for the first time around 1300. It belonged to the ministry of Böbrach, court and mill to the minstrel of Böbrach, and was awarded to the chancellor Ruger von Arnbruck on the basis of Leibrecht. In 1326, Heinrich Horenberger was mentioned as a successor to the estate and the use of the farm and the mill at Eck.

One of the closest owners of the court to Eck, from the second half of the fifteenth century, who was still to be found, was Georg Marchel with his wife. It is mentioned in the description of the court at Eck in the hall book of the box office Viechtach, laid out in 1577. It is said that the dukes Johann and Sigmund of Bavaria issued a letter of succession to the court at Eck, and the gift and bribe justice on Monday after Michaeli 1462 (4 October 1462). The owner of the farm and brewery was Leonhard Vogel in 1577. This is said to have the above-mentioned letter of 4 August 1462.

== Beers and inns ==
Today, the brewery produces approx. 1000 hl dark beer (Wilderer Dunkel, Poacher Dark), which comes naturally in the inn to the pub and is distributed over the brewery Falter Regen. The inn has 20 guest rooms, meeting rooms and about 600 seats.

== Building ==
The property consists of guest house buildings (16th century), brewery buildings (complete reconstruction 1970), Hofkapelle (early 18th century), mansion house (17th century) and a new horticulture building with gabled roof from 1985.

== See also ==
- List of oldest companies
