= Teisnach (river) =

River in Bavaria, Germany

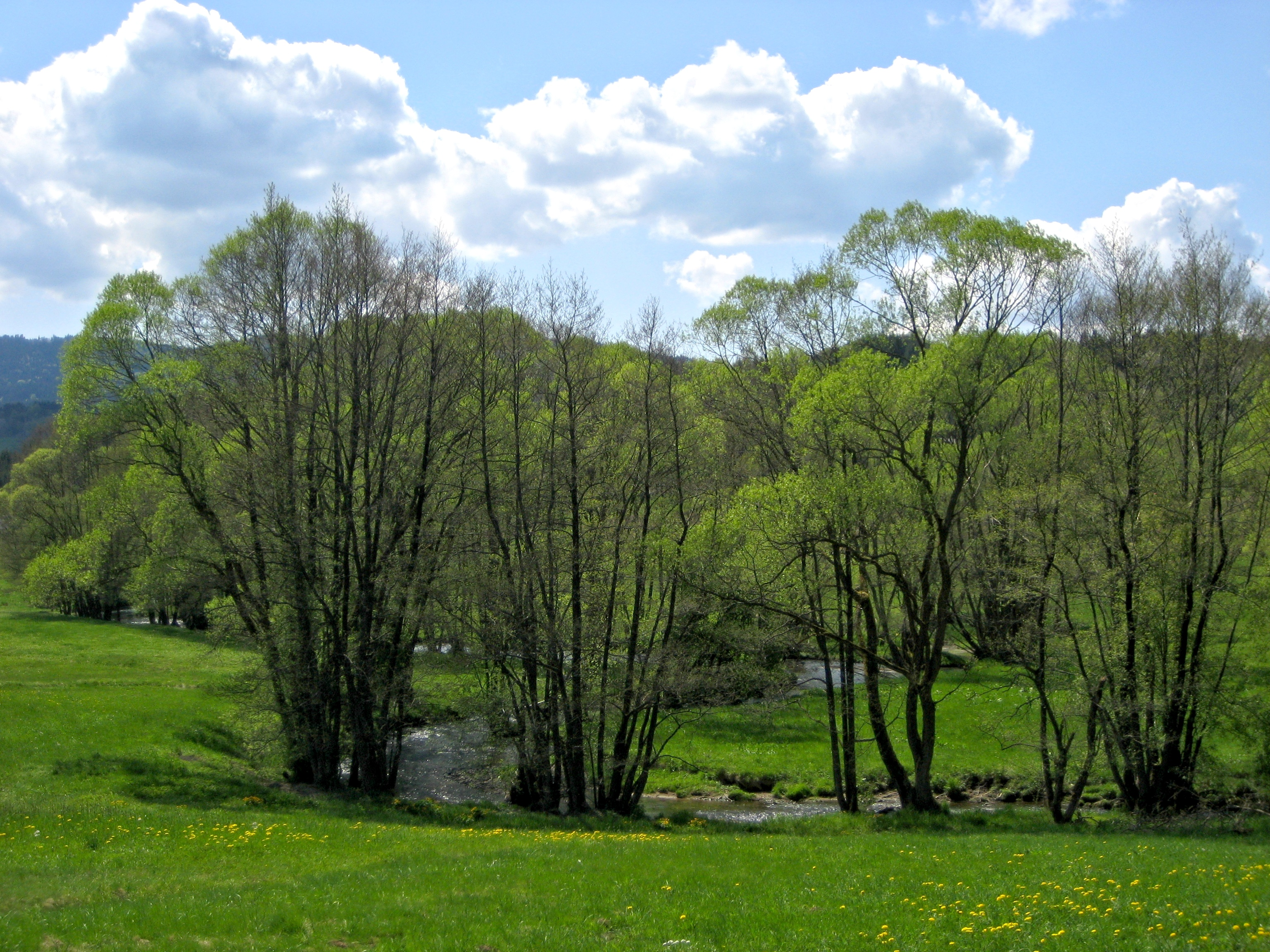
- Teisnach near Ruhmannsfelden

Location
- Country: Germany
- State: Bavaria

Physical characteristics
- Source
  - location: Confluence of Wolfertsrieder Bach and Achslacher Bach
- Mouth
  - location: Schwarzer Regen
  - coordinates: 49.0421°N 12.9932°E
  - elevation: 448 m (1,470 ft)
- Length: 23.8 km (14.8 mi)

Basin features
- Progression: Regen→ Danube→ Black Sea

Teisnach is a river of Bavaria, Germany. It flows into the Schwarzer Regen, the upper course of the Regen, in the town Teisnach.

== See also ==
- List of rivers of Bavaria
