= Buswartehobel =

Coordinates: 48.964°N 12.999778°E

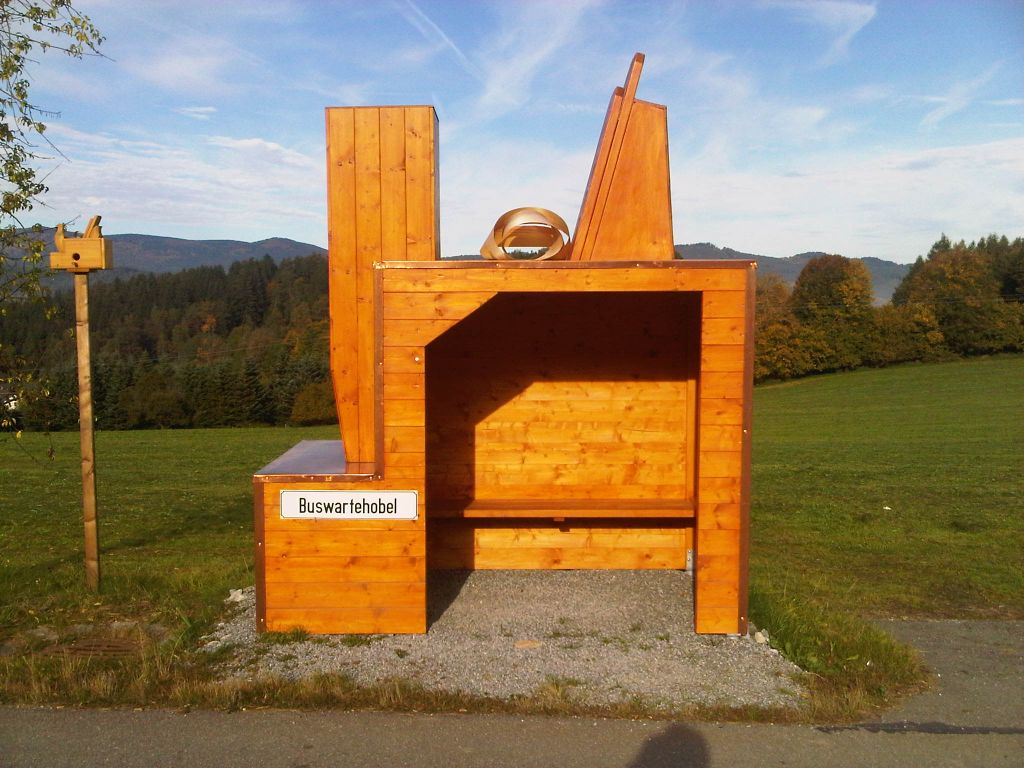
Buswartehobel and Vogelhobel

The Buswartehobel (German for Bus stop plane or literally Bus waiting plane) is a plane-shaped bus shelter in Zachenberg in the Bavarian Forest. It is located at the municipality connection road (Gemeindeverbindungsstraße) between Zachenberg and Köckersried, a short distance after the end of the village of Zachenberg.

For more than twenty years, a conventional bus shelter stood at this location. As it was in a decayed and leaky condition, it needed replacement. A local carpenter created the Buswartehobel. Directly adjoining is the Vogelhobel (bird plane), a plane-shaped nest box.
