= Böbrach =

- Municipality
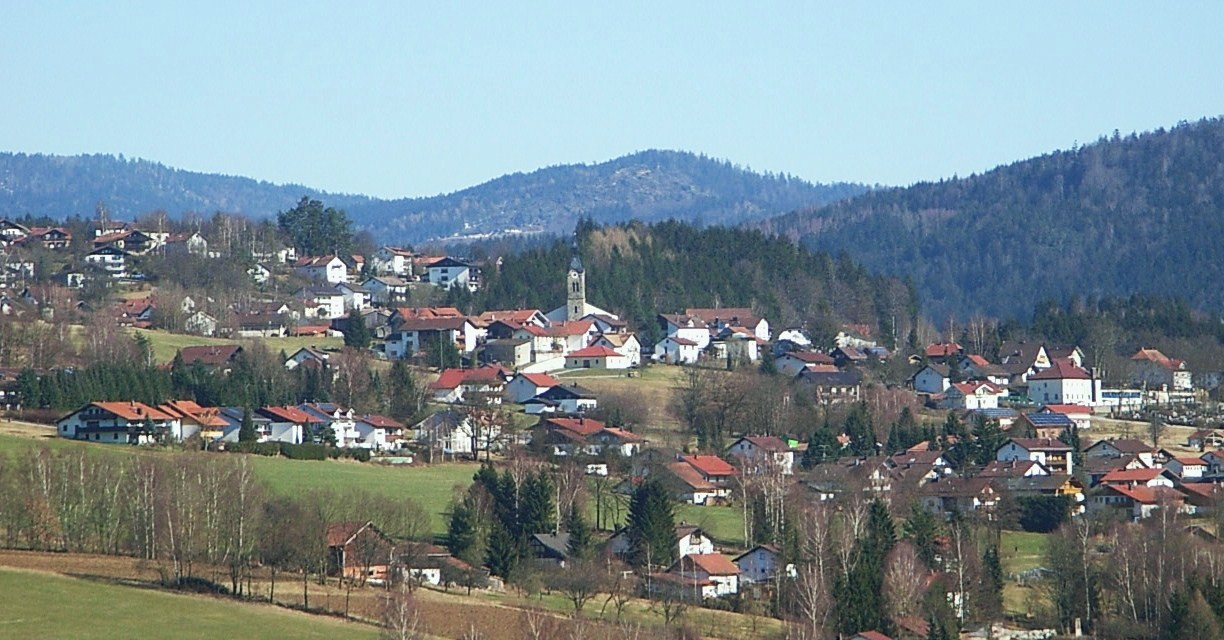
- Böbrach

- Coat of arms

- Location of Böbrach within Regen district
- Interactive map of Böbrach
- Location within Germany Location within Bavaria
- Coordinates: 49°4′N 13°2′E
- Country: Germany
- State: Bavaria
- Admin. region: Niederbayern
- District: Regen

Government
  - Mayor (2020–26): Gerd Schönberger (CSU)

Area
  - Total: 27.55 km^{2} (10.64 sq mi)
- Elevation: 576 m (1,890 ft)

Population (2025-12-31)
  - Total: 1,553
  - Density: 56.37/km^{2} (146.0/sq mi)
- Time zone: UTC+01:00 (CET)
  - Summer (DST): UTC+02:00 (CEST)
- Postal codes: 94255
- Dialling codes: 09923
- Vehicle registration: REG
- Website: www.boebrach.de

Böbrach is a municipality in the district of Regen, in Bavaria, Germany.
