= Zachenberg =

Zachenbergo
- Municipality
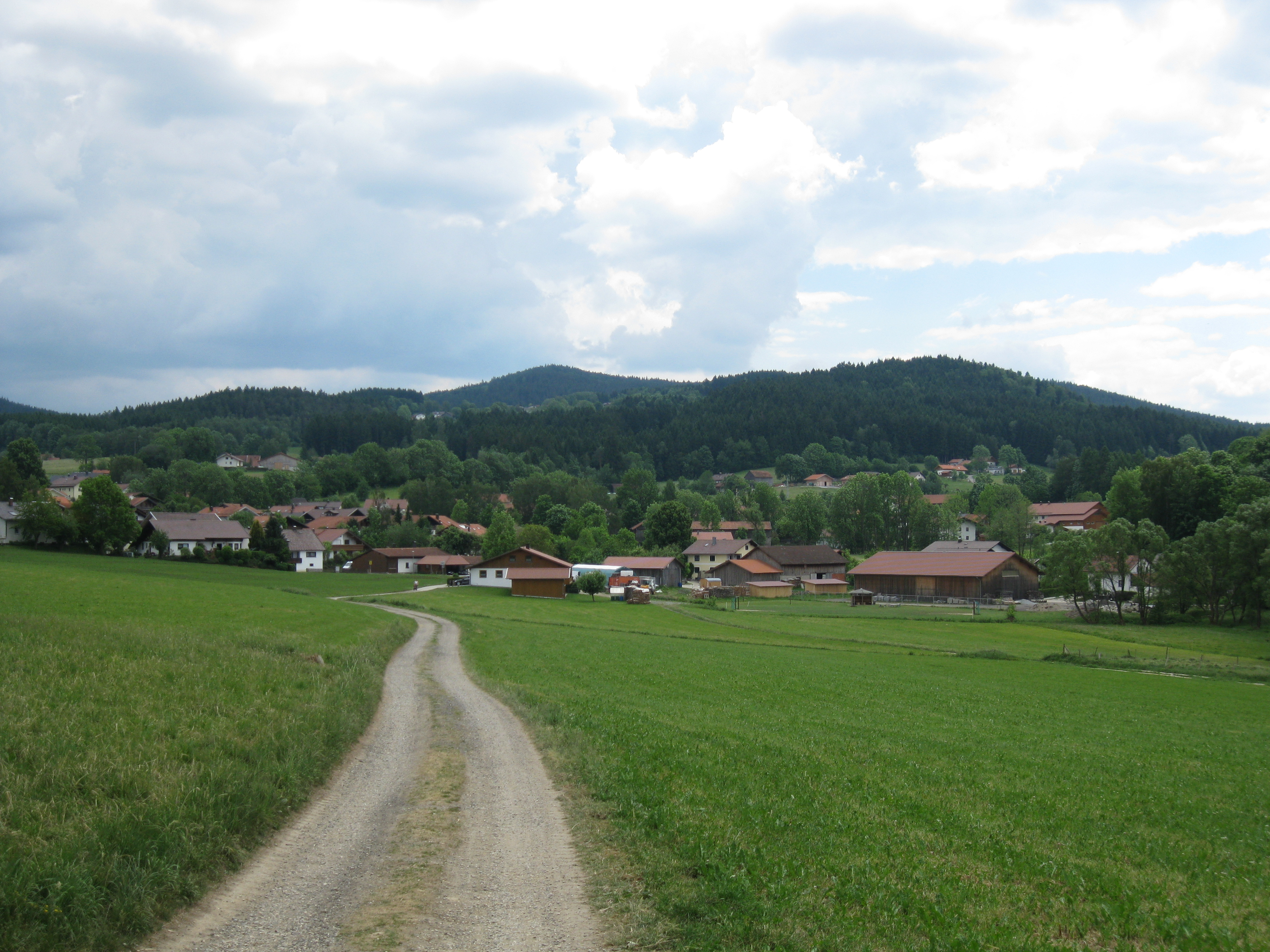
- Zachenberg

- Coat of arms

- Location of Zachenbergo within Regen district
- Interactive map of Zachenbergo
- Location within Germany Location within Bavaria
- Coordinates: 48°58′N 13°0′E
- Country: Germany
- State: Bavaria
- Admin. region: Niederbayern
- District: Regen
- Municipal assoc.: Ruhmannsfelden

Government
  - Mayor (2020–26): Hans Dachs (CSU)

Area
  - Total: 27.29 km^{2} (10.54 sq mi)
- Elevation: 602 m (1,975 ft)

Population (2025-12-31)
  - Total: 2,051
  - Density: 75.16/km^{2} (194.7/sq mi)
- Time zone: UTC+01:00 (CET)
  - Summer (DST): UTC+02:00 (CEST)
- Postal codes: 94239
- Dialling codes: 09929
- Vehicle registration: REG
- Website: www.zachenberg.de

Zachenberg (German pronunciation: [ˈtsaxn̩ˌbɛʁk]) is a municipality in the district of Regen in Bavaria in Germany. It is home to the Buswartehobel, a plane-shaped bus stop shelter.
