= Lindberg, Bavaria =

Lindberg
- Municipality
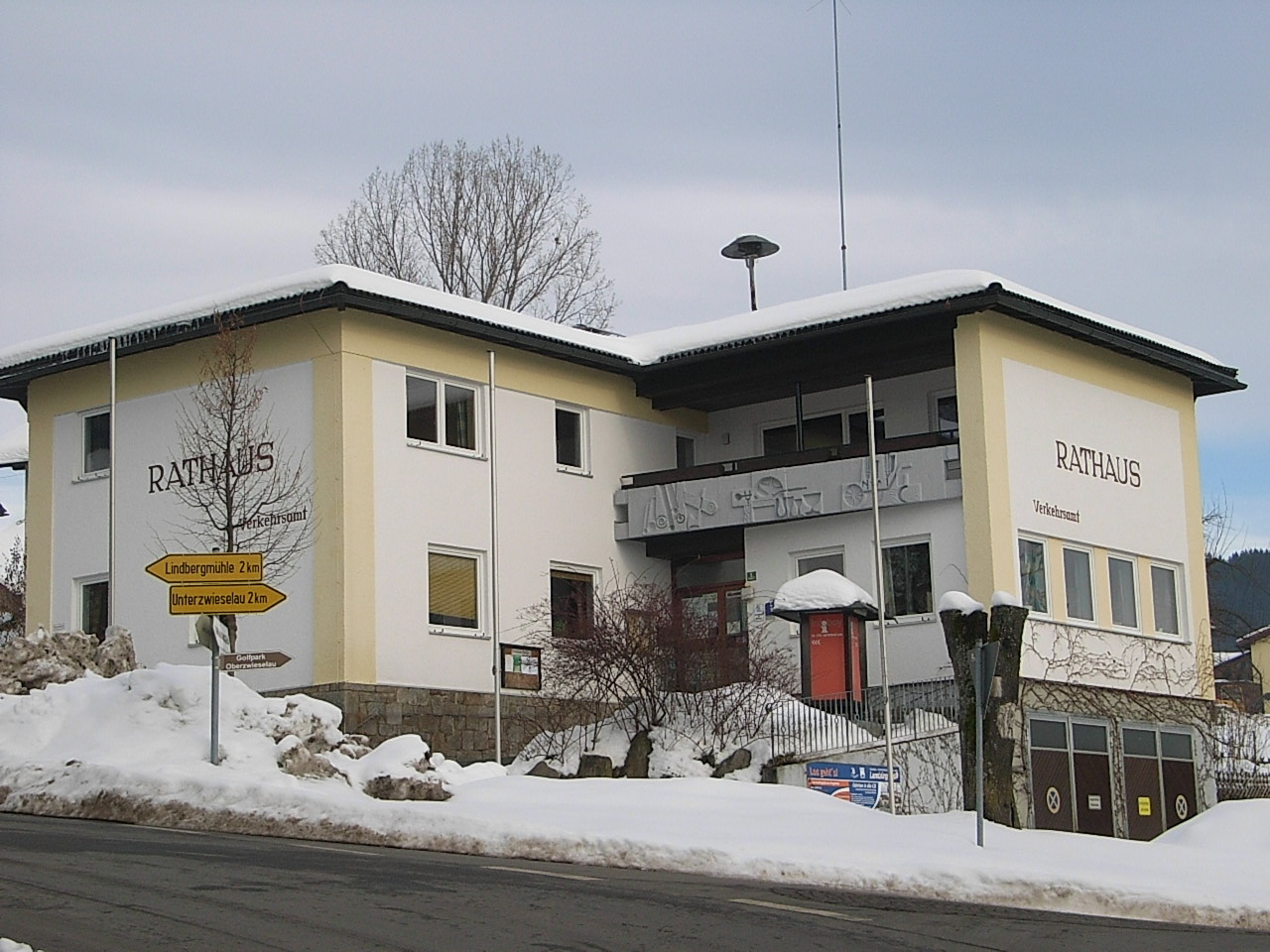
- Town hall

- Coat of arms

- Location of Lindberg within Regen district
- Interactive map of Lindberg
- Location within Germany Location within Bavaria
- Coordinates: 49°2′N 13°15′E
- Country: Germany
- State: Bavaria
- Admin. region: Niederbayern
- District: Regen

Government
  - Mayor (2020–26): Gerd Lorenz (CSU)

Area
  - Total: 108.84 km^{2} (42.02 sq mi)
- Elevation: 649 m (2,129 ft)

Population (2025-12-31)
  - Total: 2,263
  - Density: 20.79/km^{2} (53.85/sq mi)
- Time zone: UTC+01:00 (CET)
  - Summer (DST): UTC+02:00 (CEST)
- Postal codes: 94227
- Dialling codes: 09922
- Vehicle registration: REG
- Website: www.gemeinde-lindberg.de

Lindberg (German pronunciation: [ˈlɪntbɛʁk]) is a municipality in the district of Regen in Bavaria in Germany in the immediate neighbourhood of the larger town Zwiesel.

== Location ==
Lindberg lies in the Danube Forest (Donau-Wald) region in the middle of the Bavarian Forest on the Glasstraße at the foot of the 1,315-metre-high Falkenstein only four kilometres from Zwiesel and 14 km northeast of the county town of Regen, 30 km northwest of Grafenau and 14 km from the border at Bayerisch Eisenstein.

== Sights ==
- Höllbachgspreng
