= Ruhmannsfelden (Verwaltungsgemeinschaft) =

- Verwaltungsgemeinschaft
- Location of Ruhmannsfelden within Regen district
- Interactive map of Ruhmannsfelden
- Location within Germany Location within Bavaria
- Coordinates: 48°59′N 12°59′E
- Country: Germany
- State: Bavaria
- Admin. region: Lower Bavaria
- District: Regen
- Seat: Ruhmannsfelden
- Subdivisions: 4 municipalities

Area
  - Total: 72.34 km^{2} (27.93 sq mi)

Population (2025-12-31)
  - Total: 6,162
  - Density: 85.18/km^{2} (220.6/sq mi)
- Time zone: UTC+01:00 (CET)
  - Summer (DST): UTC+02:00 (CEST)
- Website: www.vg-ruhmannsfelden.com

Ruhmannsfelden is a Verwaltungsgemeinschaft (municipal association) in the district of Regen in Bavaria, Germany. Its seat is in Ruhmannsfelden.

It consists of the following municipalities:

1. Achslach
2. Gotteszell
3. Ruhmannsfelden
4. Zachenberg
