= Kirchberg im Wald =

- Municipality
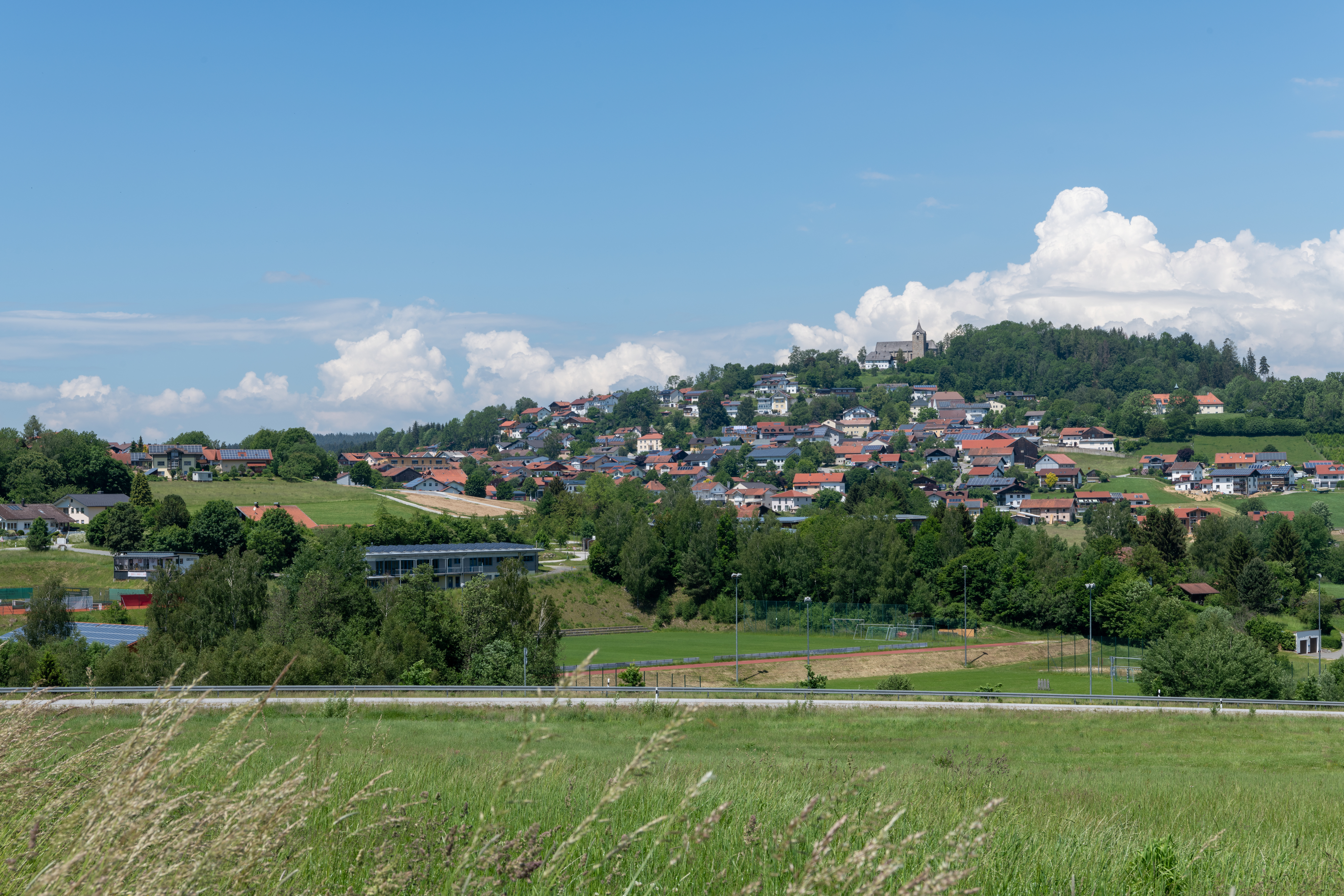
- Kirchberg im Wald

- Coat of arms

- Location of Kirchberg im Wald within Regen district
- Interactive map of Kirchberg im Wald
- Location within Germany Location within Bavaria
- Coordinates: 48°54′N 13°11′E
- Country: Germany
- State: Bavaria
- Admin. region: Niederbayern
- District: Regen
- Subdivisions: 34 districts

Government
  - Mayor (2026–32): Robert Muhr

Area
  - Total: 48.79 km^{2} (18.84 sq mi)
- Elevation: 880 m (2,890 ft)

Population (2025-12-31)
  - Total: 4,353
  - Density: 89.22/km^{2} (231.1/sq mi)
- Time zone: UTC+01:00 (CET)
  - Summer (DST): UTC+02:00 (CEST)
- Postal codes: 94259
- Dialling codes: 09927
- Vehicle registration: REG
- Website: www.kirchbergimwald.de

Kirchberg im Wald (German pronunciation: [ˈkɪʁçbɛʁk ʔɪm ˈvalt], lit. 'Kirchberg in the Forest'; officially Kirchberg i.Wald) is a municipality in the district of Regen, in Bavaria, Germany.

== International relations ==
Kirchberg im Wald is twinned with:

- Bagnolo di Po, Italy
