= Höllbachgspreng =

Wooded rock massif in Bavarian Forest, Germany

Coordinates: 49°5′9″N 13°17′48″E

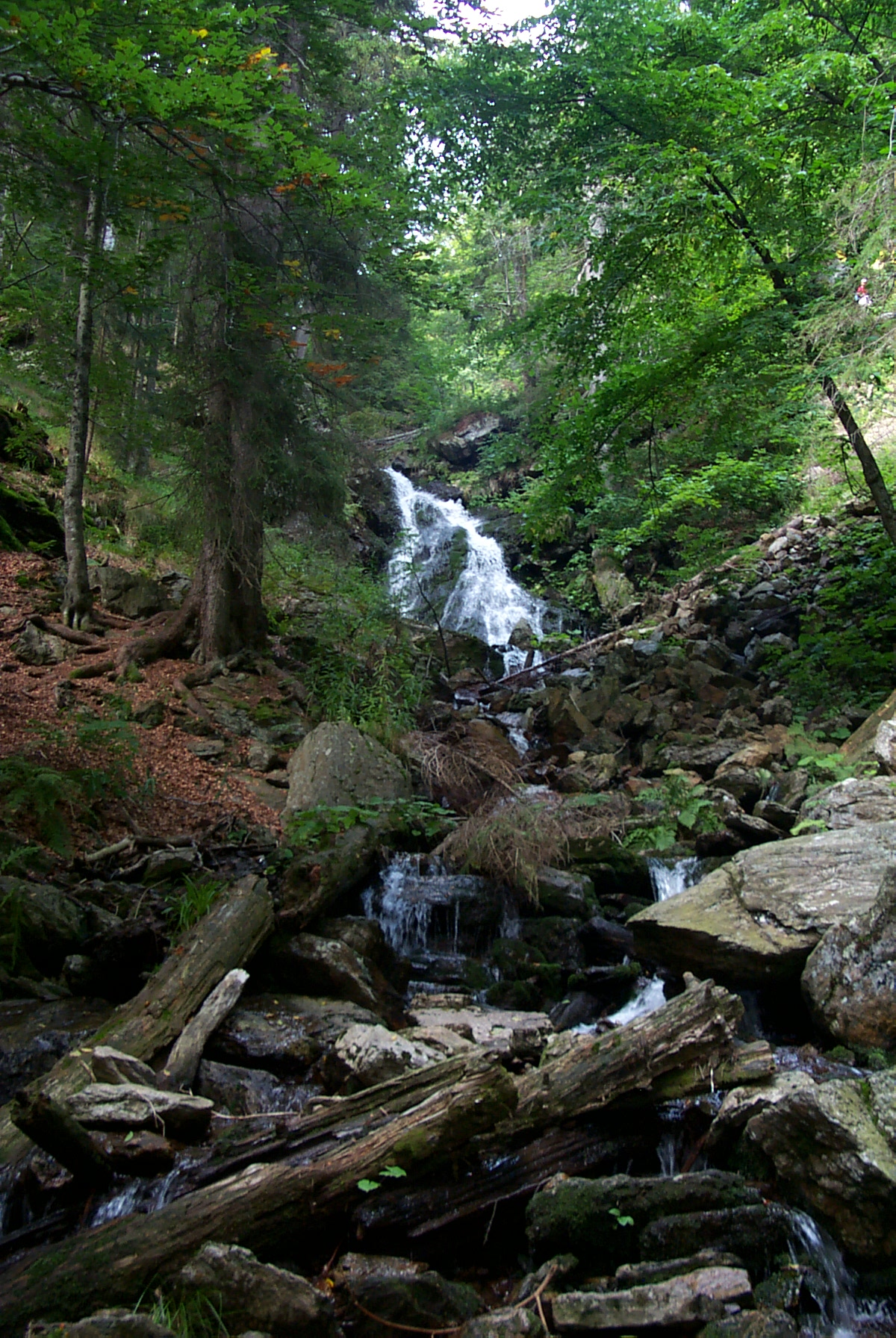
Waterfall in the Höllbachgspreng.

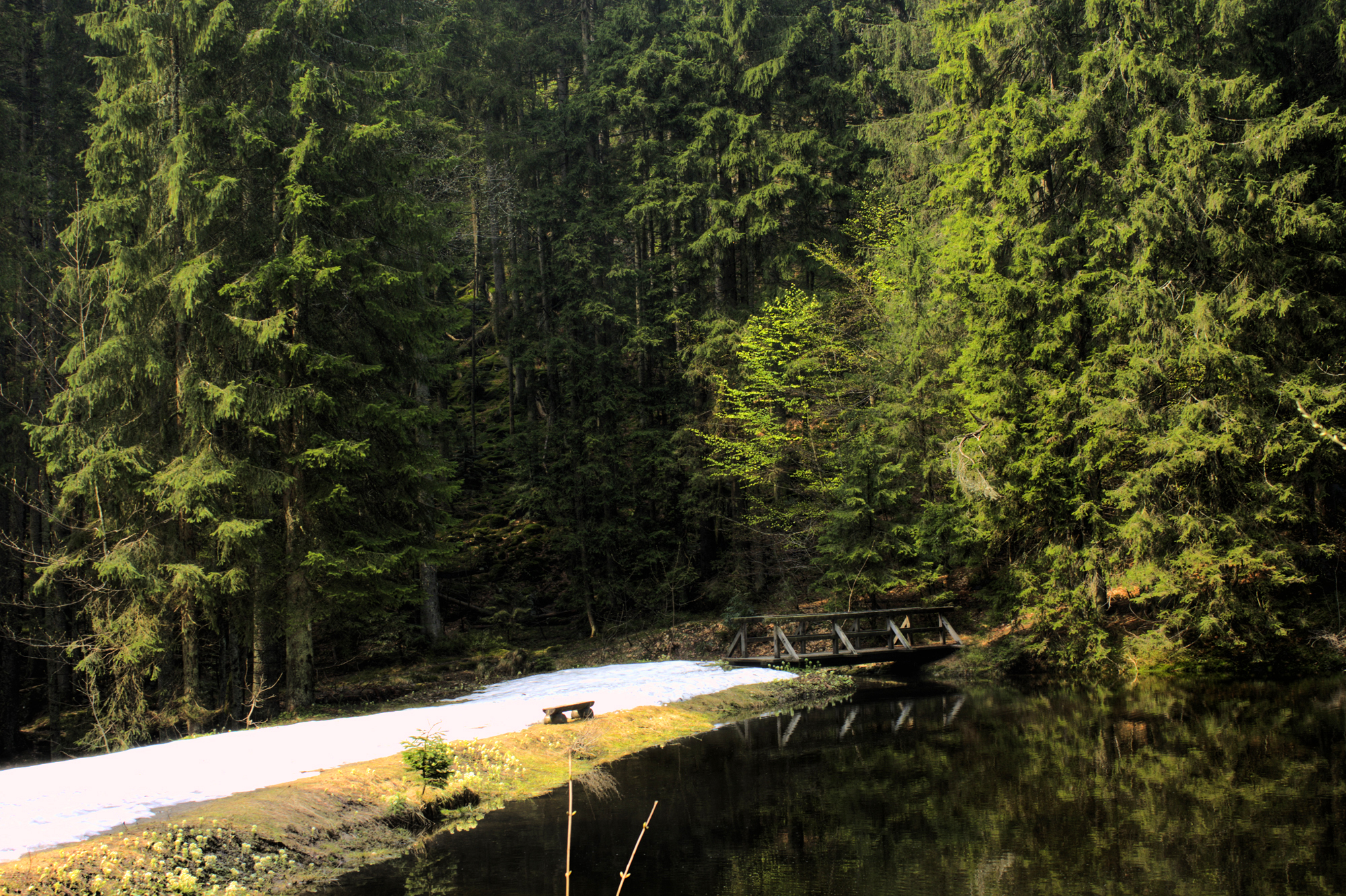
The Höllbachschwelle

The Höllbachgspreng is a wooded rock massif below the Großer Falkenstein mountain in the vicinity of Lindberg in the Bavarian Forest, Germany.

== Description ==
This terrain hollow with extremely steep sides owes its formation to the last ice age. A mountain trail runs through the ancient forest here. Through a narrow, ravine the Höllbach rushes between, gneiss rocks as high as a house in places. On the northern boundary of the region it drops as a waterfall into the depths. The western part of the area is dominated by the Großer Falkenstein.

The slopes are covered with trees such as sycamore, Norway spruce, beech, silver fir and wych elm. The undergrowth includes rare plants like alpine lady-fern, chickweed-wintergreen, sundews, martagon lily and Hungarian gentian. On the rocks grows the very rare sulphur dust lichen (Schwefelflechte). As far as birds are concerned the region is relatively species-poor with only 36 types occurring, the course of the stream with its associated draught of cold air being mainly responsible.

== Access ==
A trail leads through the gorge to the summit of the Großer Falkenstein. The wild and romantic path is only recommended forexperienced and determined hikers because it is very steep, in places crosses the rocks of the stream and fallen trees may have to be negotiated. In any case, sure-footedness and stout footwear are essential. The ascent from the Höllbachschwelle takes about 1 1/2 hours.

== Nature reserve ==
As early as around 1860, nature lovers argued that the region, which was difficult to access, should remain free of forestry activity. As a result, its ancient woodland character has survived. The Höllbachgspreng Nature Reserve (Naturschutzgebiet Höllbachgspreng) was established by the governments of Lower Bavaria and Upper Palatinate on 17 January 1941 (Reg.Anz. Ausg. 26/28). It has an area of 51.3 ha. Since the expansion of the national park in 1997 it has been part of the Bavarian Forest National Park. Climbing on the rocks of the Höllbachgspreng is forbidden at any time of the year.

== See also ==
- Waterfalls of Germany
