= Prackenbach =

- Municipality
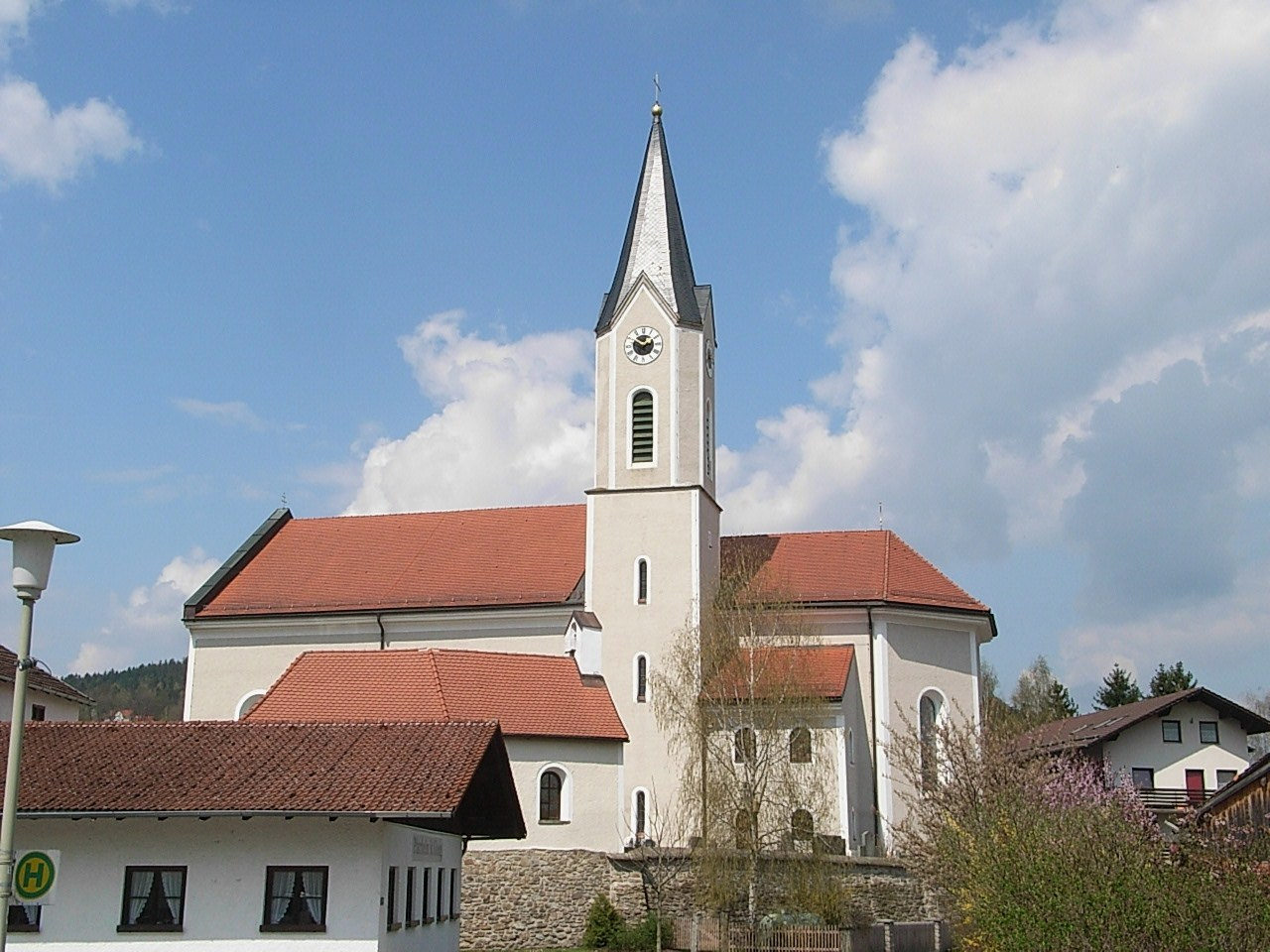
- Saint George Church

- Coat of arms

- Location of Prackenbach within Regen district
- Interactive map of Prackenbach
- Location within Germany Location within Bavaria
- Coordinates: 49°6′N 12°50′E
- Country: Germany
- State: Bavaria
- Admin. region: Niederbayern
- District: Regen

Government
  - Mayor (2020–26): Andreas Eckl (FW)

Area
  - Total: 40.08 km^{2} (15.47 sq mi)
- Elevation: 496 m (1,627 ft)

Population (2025-12-31)
  - Total: 2,808
  - Density: 70.06/km^{2} (181.5/sq mi)
- Time zone: UTC+01:00 (CET)
  - Summer (DST): UTC+02:00 (CEST)
- Postal codes: 94267
- Dialling codes: 09942
- Vehicle registration: REG
- Website: www.prackenbach.de

Prackenbach (German pronunciation: [ˈpʁakn̩ˌbax]) is a municipality in the district of Regen in Bavaria in Germany.

== History ==
Prackenbach was mentioned in 1280 as a noble residence. The Schälchl zu Krailing family owned the Hofmark in the 15th and 16th centuries in the Krailing district. The residence belonged to the Straubing Rentamt and the Viechtach District Court of the Electorate of Bavaria. In the course of the administrative reforms in the Kingdom of Bavaria, today's community came into being with the municipal edict of 1818. On May 1, 1978, the previously independent communities of Moosbach and Ruhmannsdorf were incorporated.

== Districts ==
Prackenbach has 66 districts:

- Ahrain
- Altwies
- Anger
- Aurieden
- Bartlberg
- Berg
- Boxberg
- Dumpf
- Egern
- Egernhäusl
- Ehrenhof
- Engelsdorf
- Fichtental
- Frauenwies
- Geigenmühle
- Grub
- Hagengrub
- Heiligenwies
- Heilmberg
- Herzogsäge
- Hetzelsdorf
- Hinterhagengrub
- Hintermaulendorf
- Igleinsberg
- Kager
- Krailing
- Kreilstein
- Lehen
- Leuthen
- Lexanger
- Maierhof
- Meidengrub
- Mitterdorf
- Moosbach
- Moosbacherau
- Moosberg
- Neuhäusel
- Neumühle
- Obermühle
- Oberreisach
- Oberrubendorf
- Oberstein
- Oberviechtafell
- Ödland
- Prackenbach
- Rattersberg
- Ruhmannsdorf
- Schöpferhof
- Schwaben
- Schwabwies
- Schwarzendorf
- Steinhof
- Steinmühle
- Tafertshof
- Thannhof
- Tresdorf
- Unterreisach
- Unterrubendorf
- Unterviechtafell
- Voggenzell
- Vormühle
- Wiedenhof
- Wiedenmühle
- Zeitlau
- Zeitlhof
- Zell
