= Clara Nordström =

German writer and translator

- Born: 18 January 1886; Karlskrona
- Died: 1962 (aged 75–76); Mindelheim
- Other name: Clara Elisabet von Vegesack
- Occupations: landlord and property developer
- Known for: writing
- Spouse: Siegfried von Vegesack

Clara Nordström, became Clara Elisabet von Vegesack, (January 18, 1886, in Karlskrona, Sweden – February 7, 1962, in Mindelheim, West Germany) was a German writer and translator of Swedish descent. With the themes of her writing and her Swedish maiden name, she profited from the German interest for Scandinavian writers. She owned part of Weißenstein Castle in Lower Bavaria.

== Biography ==
Born the daughter of a physician and a peasant woman in Karlskrona and brought up in Växjö (Sweden), she was bedridden owing to illness up to her twelfth year. It was only after that, from about 1897, that she started to frequent various private schools in Växjö. In 1903, she went to Hildesheim and shortly afterwards to Braunschweig (again in Germany). She was to learn the German language. On April 17, 1905 she married, in Växjö, the son of her teacher, 15 years her senior, and in 1906 gave birth to their son Gustav Adolf. She got divorced in 1909 after she had been left by her husband. Nordström returned to Växjö for a short time and in the same year moved to Berlin to become a photographer. After three years of instruction and practical training, she had to give up her profession for health reasons. In 1912, she went to Munich to become a writer. It was there that in 1914 she met Siegfried von Vegesack, whom she married in 1915 in Stockholm.

In 1916, she moved with her husband to Berlin, where in April 1917 her daughter Isabel was born. Because of an ailment of Siegfried von Vegesack's, the family in 1917 moved to a farm near Dingolfing and later to Großwalding near Deggendorf. In 1918, they acquired a tower near Regen, which they refurbished into a residential tower.

In 1920, Karin, their second daughter was born but she died only a few days later. In 1923 their son Gotthard was born. In the same year Nordström published her first novel Tomtelilla both in Germany and in Sweden.

With her mother's death, an important source of income had run dry. Therefore, Nordström opened up, in the tower, a place for artists and writers to live. In these years, the couple started gradually to grow apart. In 1929 the family moved to Switzerland. Shortly afterwards Clara Nordström moved with her children to Stuttgart and got a divorce in 1935 at Vegesack's wish. In that year she started to read from her works all over Germany. Her 1933 novel Kajsa Lejondahl was successful.

From her German base, she also wrote articles in the Swedish Nazi press. In 1936, she returned for a short period to the residential tower in Weißenstein near Regen and in 1938/39 she built a house in Baiersbronn in the Black Forest. In 1944, she was called to Königsberg to read from her texts for the radio station run by the German Propagandaministerium transmitting in Swedish, but in 1944 had to flee to Hamburg.

Throughout her life, she again and again had to struggle with severe ailments and therefore intensely questioned her faith, which is what the characters in her books do. In 1948, she converted from Protestantism to Catholicism. Round about 1950 she again moved to Stuttgart and took orders ("Oblatin" of St. Benedict) in the convent of Neresheim. In 1952, she settled in Dießen on Lake Ammersee to be able to read from her works in Bavaria. She died in 1962 and was buried in Mindelheim.

== Publications ==
- Tomtelilla, 1923 (enlarged edition 1953)
- Kajsa Lejondahl, 1933
- Frau Kajsa, 1934
- Roger Björn, 1935
- Lillemor, 1936
- Der Ruf der Heimat, 1938
- Bengta, die Bäuerin aus Skane, 1941
- Sternenreiter, 1946 (from 1951 published by a different publisher under the name Engelbrecht Engelbrechtsson)
- Die letzte der Svenske, 1952
- Licht zwischen den Wolken, 1952
- Kristof, 1955
- Der Weg in das große Leuchten, 1955
- Mein Leben, 1957
- Der Findling vom Sankt Erikshof, 1961
- Die Flucht nach Schweden, 1960
- Die höhere Liebe, 1963 (published after her death)
