= Geiersthal =

- Municipality
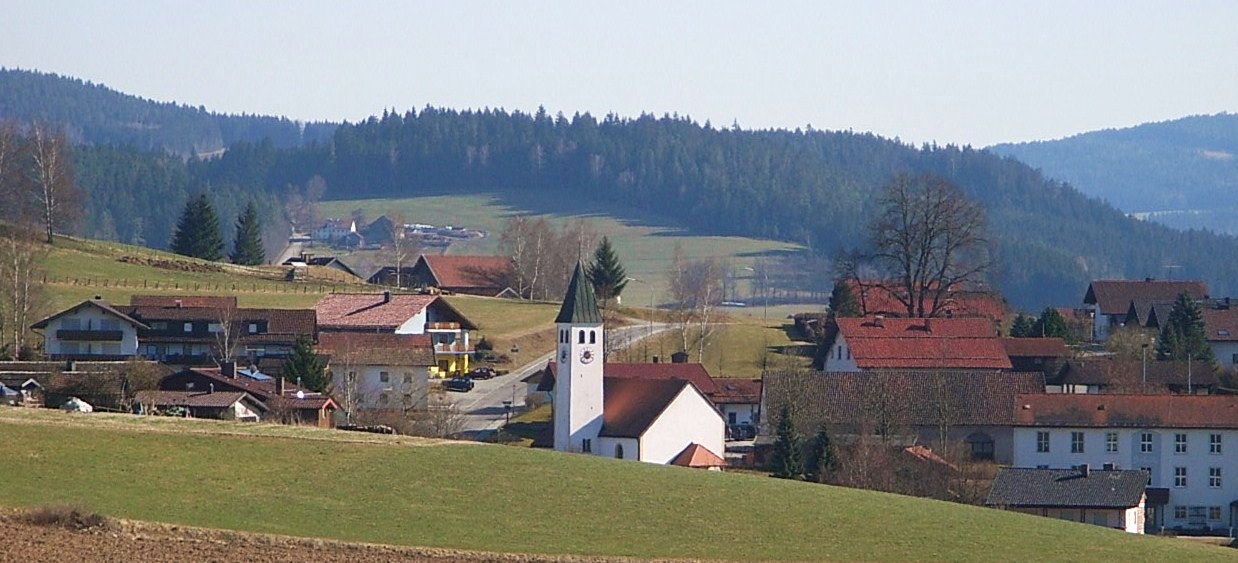
- General view of Geiersthal from north-west

- Coat of arms

- Location of Geiersthal within Regen district
- Interactive map of Geiersthal
- Location within Germany Location within Bavaria
- Coordinates: 49°3′N 12°59′E
- Country: Germany
- State: Bavaria
- Admin. region: Niederbayern
- District: Regen
- Subdivisions: 32 districts

Government
  - Mayor (2020–26): Richard Gruber (FW)

Area
  - Total: 22.37 km^{2} (8.64 sq mi)
- Elevation: 505 m (1,657 ft)

Population (2025-12-31)
  - Total: 2,234
  - Density: 99.87/km^{2} (258.7/sq mi)
- Time zone: UTC+01:00 (CET)
  - Summer (DST): UTC+02:00 (CEST)
- Postal codes: 94244
- Dialling codes: 09923
- Vehicle registration: REG
- Website: www.geiersthal.de

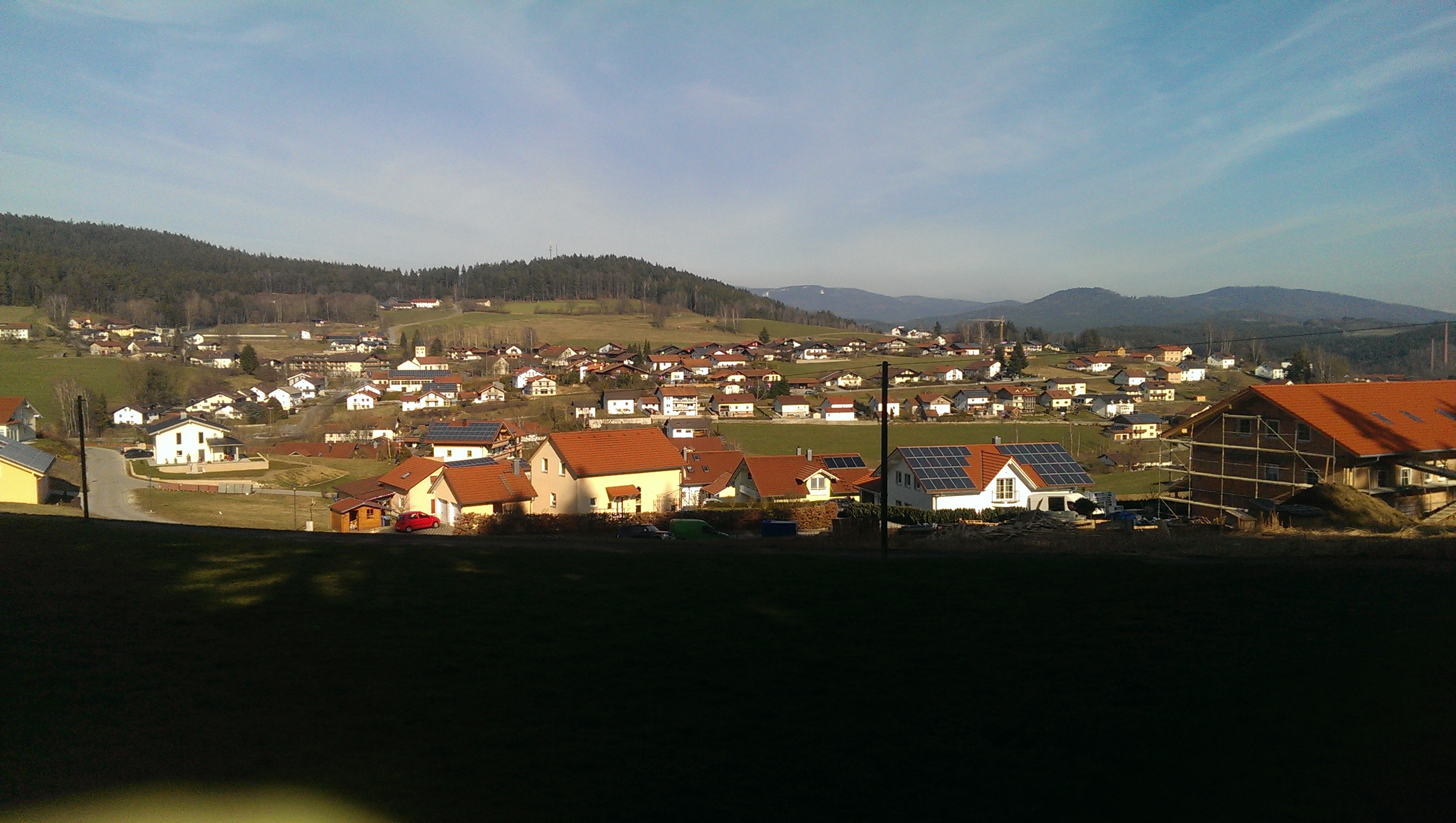
Geiersthal von Westen gesehen

Geiersthal (German pronunciation: [ˈɡaɪɐstaːl]) is a municipality in the district of Regen in Bavaria in Germany.
