= Ruhmannsfelden =

- Municipality
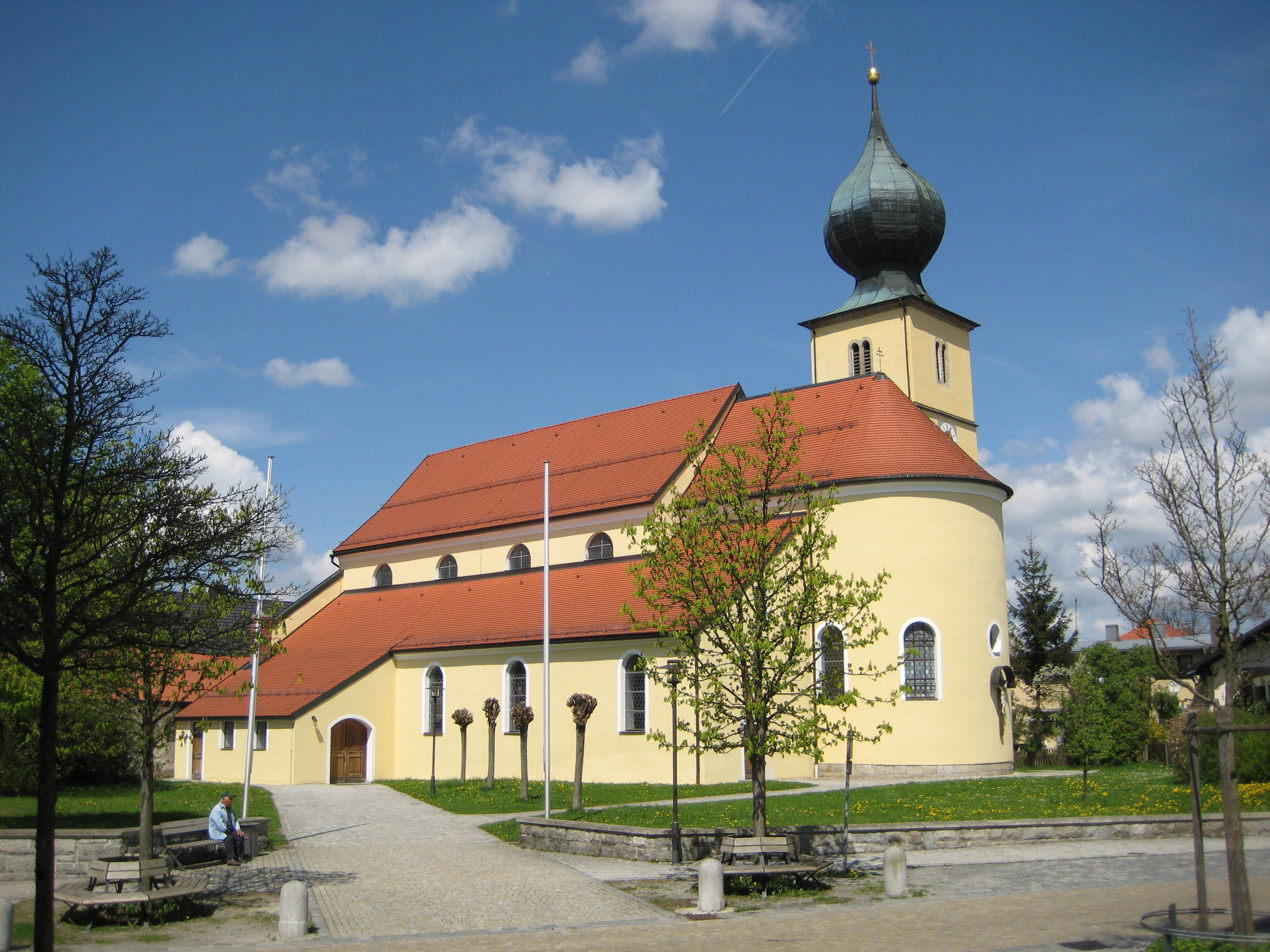
- Saint Lawrence Church

- Coat of arms

- Location of Ruhmannsfelden within Regen district
- Interactive map of Ruhmannsfelden
- Location within Germany Location within Bavaria
- Coordinates: 48°59′N 12°59′E
- Country: Germany
- State: Bavaria
- Admin. region: Niederbayern
- District: Regen
- Municipal assoc.: Ruhmannsfelden

Government
  - Mayor (2020–26): Werner Troiber (CSU)

Area
  - Total: 5.8 km^{2} (2.2 sq mi)
- Elevation: 536 m (1,759 ft)

Population (2025-12-31)
  - Total: 2,015
  - Density: 350/km^{2} (900/sq mi)
- Time zone: UTC+01:00 (CET)
  - Summer (DST): UTC+02:00 (CEST)
- Postal codes: 94239
- Dialling codes: 09929
- Vehicle registration: REG
- Website: www.ruhmannsfelden.de

Ruhmannsfelden (German pronunciation: [ʁuːmansˈfɛldn̩]) is a larger municipality in the district of Regen, in Bavaria, Germany.

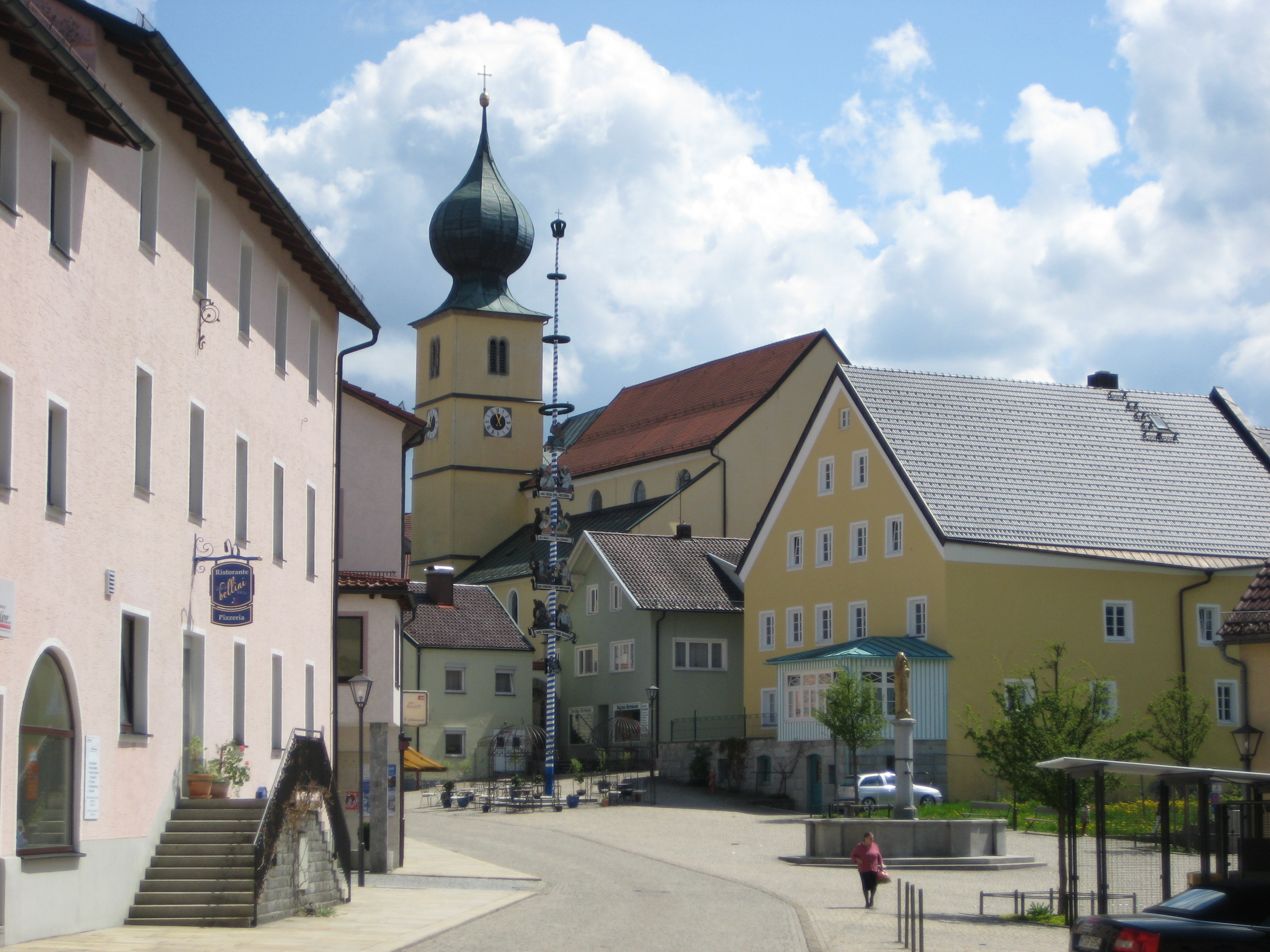
Town center

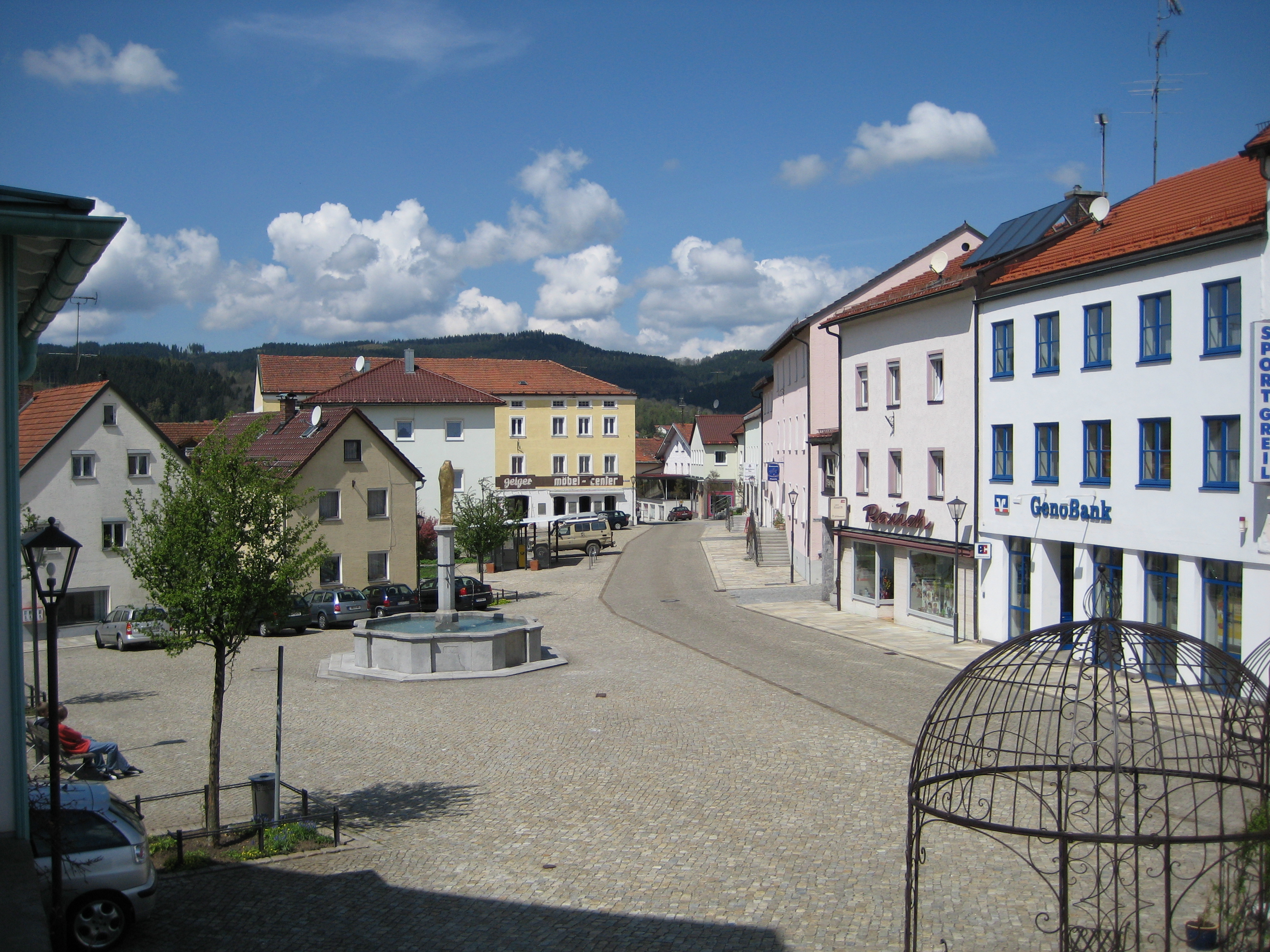
Town center

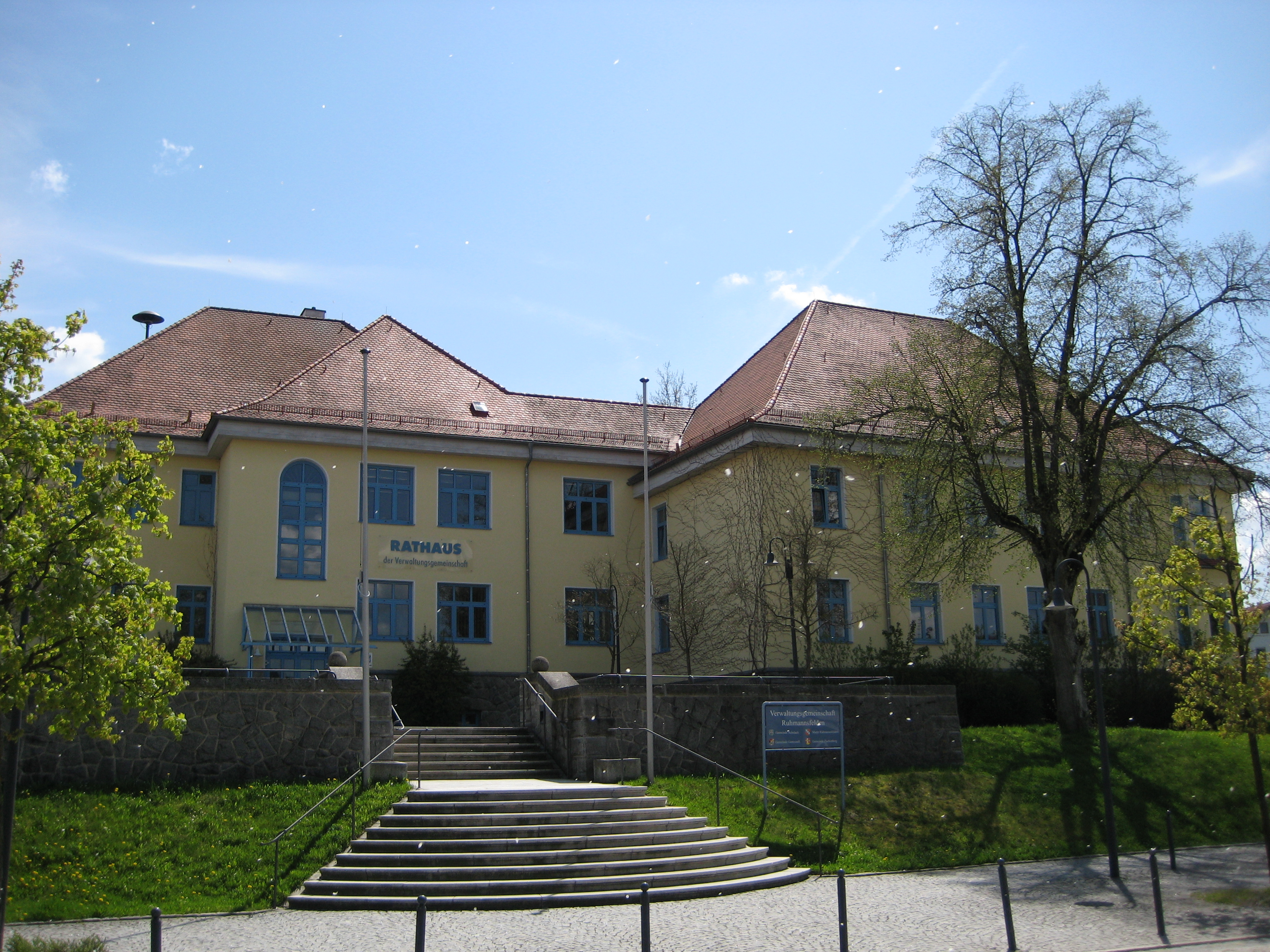
Town hall
