= Bettmannsäge =

- Village of Regen
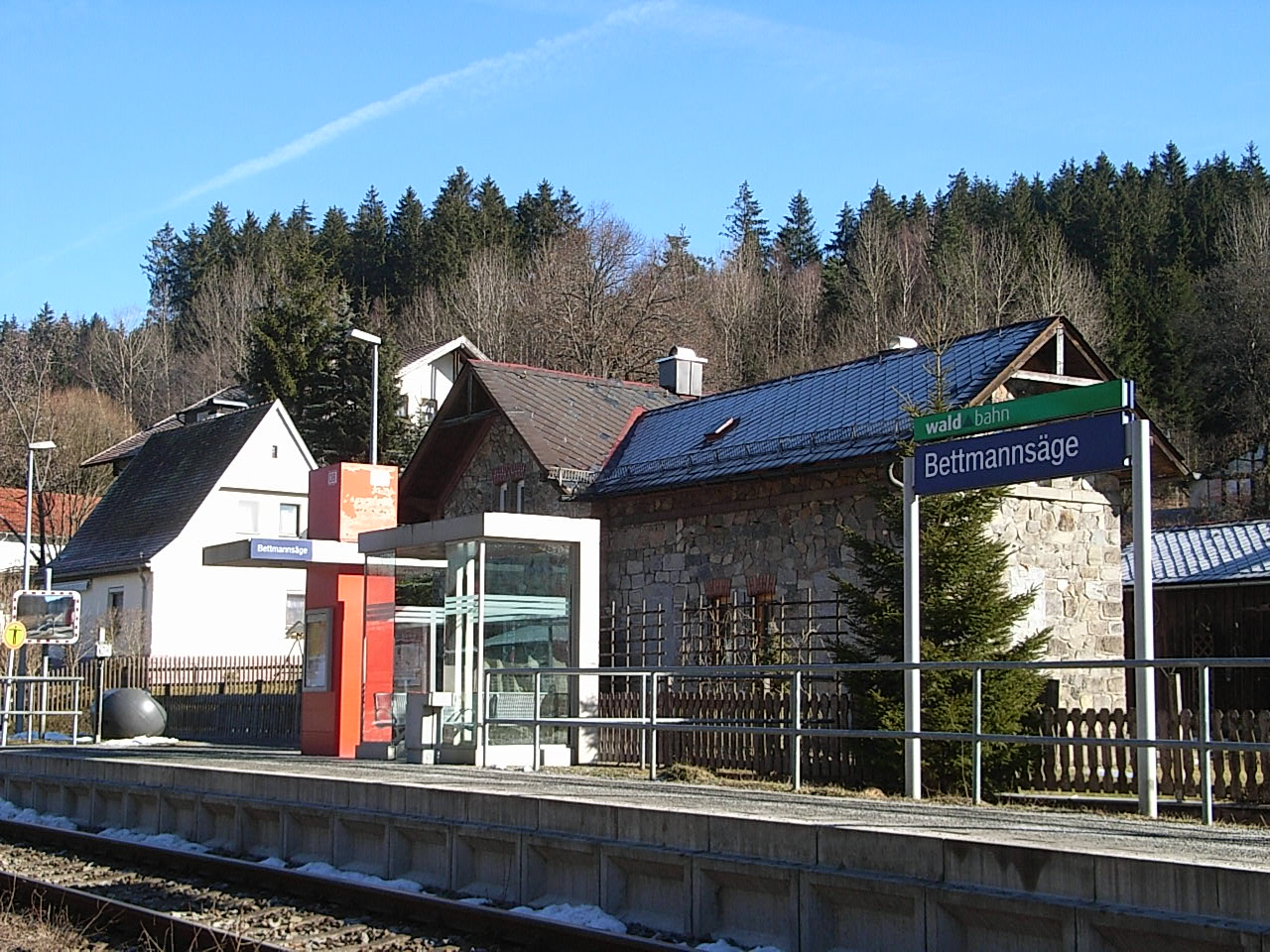
- Bettmannsäge railway halt
- Interactive map of Bettmannsäge
- Location within Germany Location within Bavaria
- Coordinates: 48°59′46″N 13°11′11″E
- Country: Germany
- State: Bavaria
- Town: Regen
- Elevation: 567 m (1,860 ft)
- Time zone: UTC+01:00 (CET)
  - Summer (DST): UTC+02:00 (CEST)
- Postal codes: 94209
- Dialling codes: 09922

Bettmannsäge is a village in the borough of Regen in the Bavarian Forest region of Germany. It has a population of about 150.

== Location ==
Bettmannsäge lies between Zwiesel and Regen on the railway line from Plattling to Bayerisch Eisenstein, the so-called Bavarian Forest Railway.

== History ==
The name of the village is derived from a large sawmill, which was built on the banks of the Black Regen. On 1 May 1898 it was given its own halt on the railway line. The sawmill was linked to the main line by a loading siding and a turntable was used to distribute the wagons to the various industrial sidings.

Because the owner of the sawmill was a Jew, the village was renamed during the Nazi era on 4 October 1936 to Regentalsäge. On 14 May 1950 it was renamed to Bettmannsäge. After the firm was wound up in 1950 the loading siding was lifted in 1951.

Bettmannsäge used to belong to the municipality of Rinchnachmündt and was incorporated with it as part of the municipal reforms on 1 May 1978 into the borough of Regen.

== Literature ==
- Horst Sauer: Die Orte Schweinhütt, Bettmannsäge, Dreieck und Tausendbach: Ein kulturgeschichtliches Tagebuch in Berichten und Bildern. Agentur SSL, Grafenau, 2004. ISBN 3-9809219-1-3.
- Walther Zeitler: Die bayerische Waldbahn. Passau, 1991, ISBN 3-924484-38-4.
