= Regen (district) =

Coordinates: 49°00′N 13°10′E

- District
- Flag Coat of arms
- Country: Germany
- State: Bavaria
- Adm. region: Lower Bavaria
- Capital: Regen

Government
  - District admin.: Ronny Raith (CSU)

Area
  - Total: 975 km^{2} (376 sq mi)

Population (31 December 2025)
  - Total: 77,118
  - Density: 79.1/km^{2} (205/sq mi)
- Time zone: UTC+01:00 (CET)
  - Summer (DST): UTC+02:00 (CEST)
- Vehicle registration: REG, VIT
- Website: landkreis-regen.de

Regen is a Landkreis (district) in Bavaria, Germany. It is bounded by (from the south and clockwise) the districts of Freyung-Grafenau, Deggendorf, Straubing-Bogen and Cham, and by the Czech Republic (Plzeň Region).

== History ==
The district was established in 1972 by merging the former districts of Regen and Viechtach.

== Geography ==
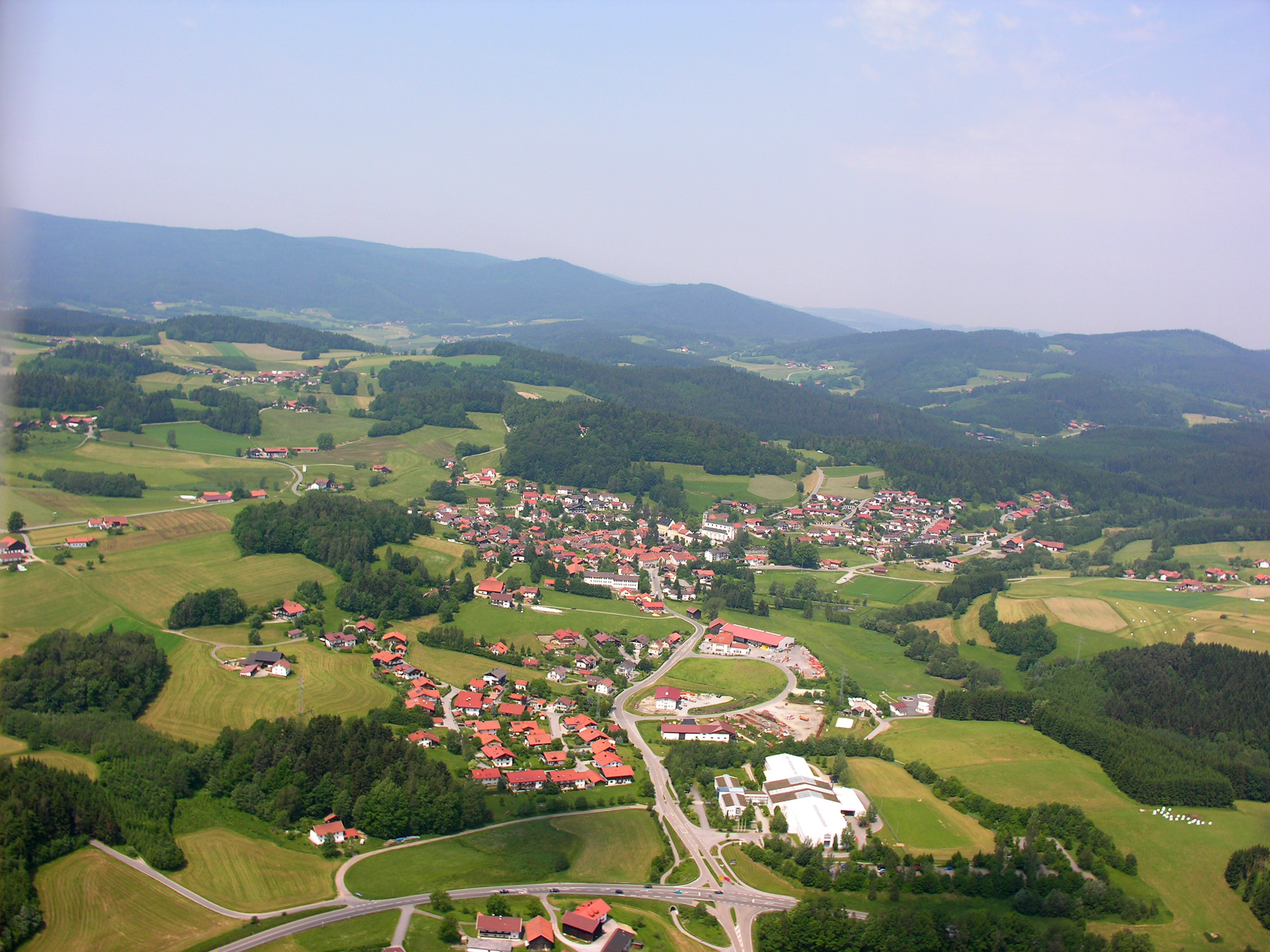
Gotteszell municipality in the district

The district is entirely located in the Bavarian Forest. It is named after its capital Regen, which shares its name with the river Regen that flows through the district.

== Coat of arms ==
The coat of arms displays:

- the blue and white checked pattern of Bavaria
- a glass, symbolising the glass industry
- a pine tree, symbolising the Bavarian Forest
- a tower, symbolising the castles in the district

== Towns and municipalities ==
Clickable map of towns and municipalities in the district

Towns
1. Regen
2. Viechtach
3. Zwiesel

Märkte

1. Bodenmais
2. Teisnach
Municipalities
1. Arnbruck
2. Bayerisch Eisenstein
3. Bischofsmais
4. Böbrach
5. Drachselsried
6. Frauenau
7. Geiersthal
8. Kirchberg im Wald

9. Kirchdorf im Wald
10. Kollnburg
11. Langdorf
12. Lindberg
13. Patersdorf
14. Prackenbach
15. Rinchnach

Verwaltungsgemeinschaften

1. Ruhmannsfelden

1. Achslach
2. Gotteszell
3. Ruhmannsfelden^{1,2}
4. Zachenberg
^{1}seat of the Verwaltungsgemeinschaft; ^{2}Markt
