= Patersdorf =

- Municipality
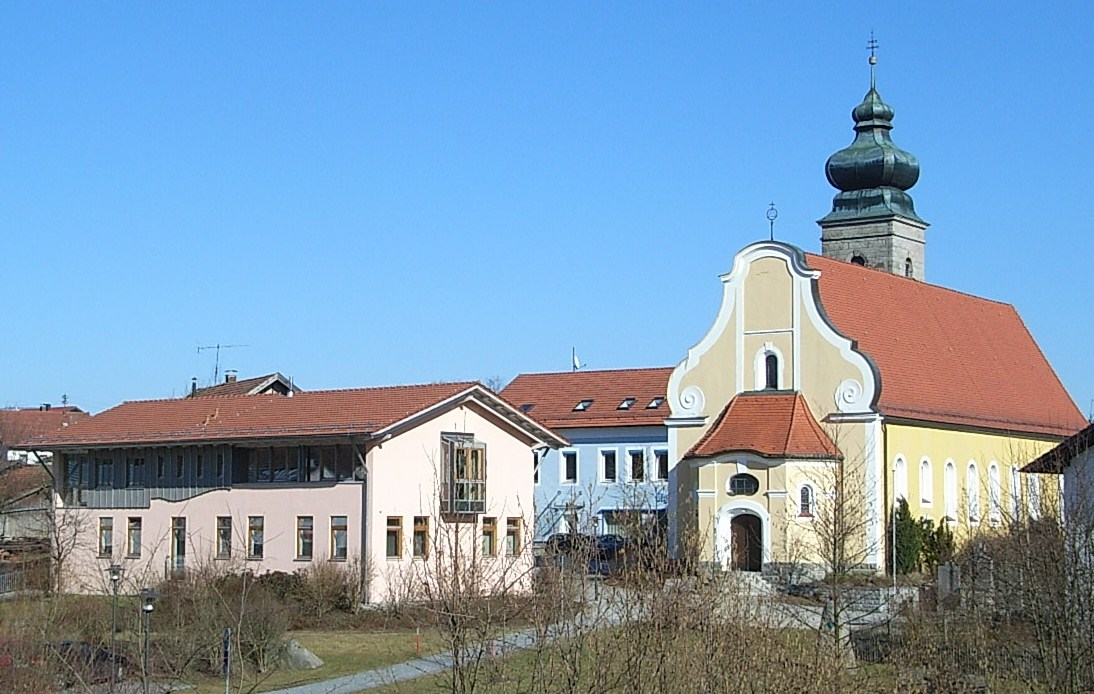
- Patersdorf town hall (left) and the St Martin Parish Church (right) viewed from the south-west

- Coat of arms

- Location of Patersdorf within Regen district
- Interactive map of Patersdorf
- Location within Germany Location within Bavaria
- Coordinates: 49°1′N 12°59′E
- Country: Germany
- State: Bavaria
- Admin. region: Niederbayern
- District: Regen

Government
  - Mayor (2021–27): Adolf Muhr (SPD)

Area
  - Total: 17.04 km^{2} (6.58 sq mi)
- Elevation: 503 m (1,650 ft)

Population (2025-12-31)
  - Total: 1,704
  - Density: 100.0/km^{2} (259.0/sq mi)
- Time zone: UTC+01:00 (CET)
  - Summer (DST): UTC+02:00 (CEST)
- Postal codes: 94265
- Dialling codes: 09923
- Vehicle registration: REG
- Website: www.patersdorf.de

Patersdorf (German pronunciation: [ˈpaːtɐsdɔʁf]) is a municipality in the district of Regen in Bavaria in Germany.
