= Regen =

- Town
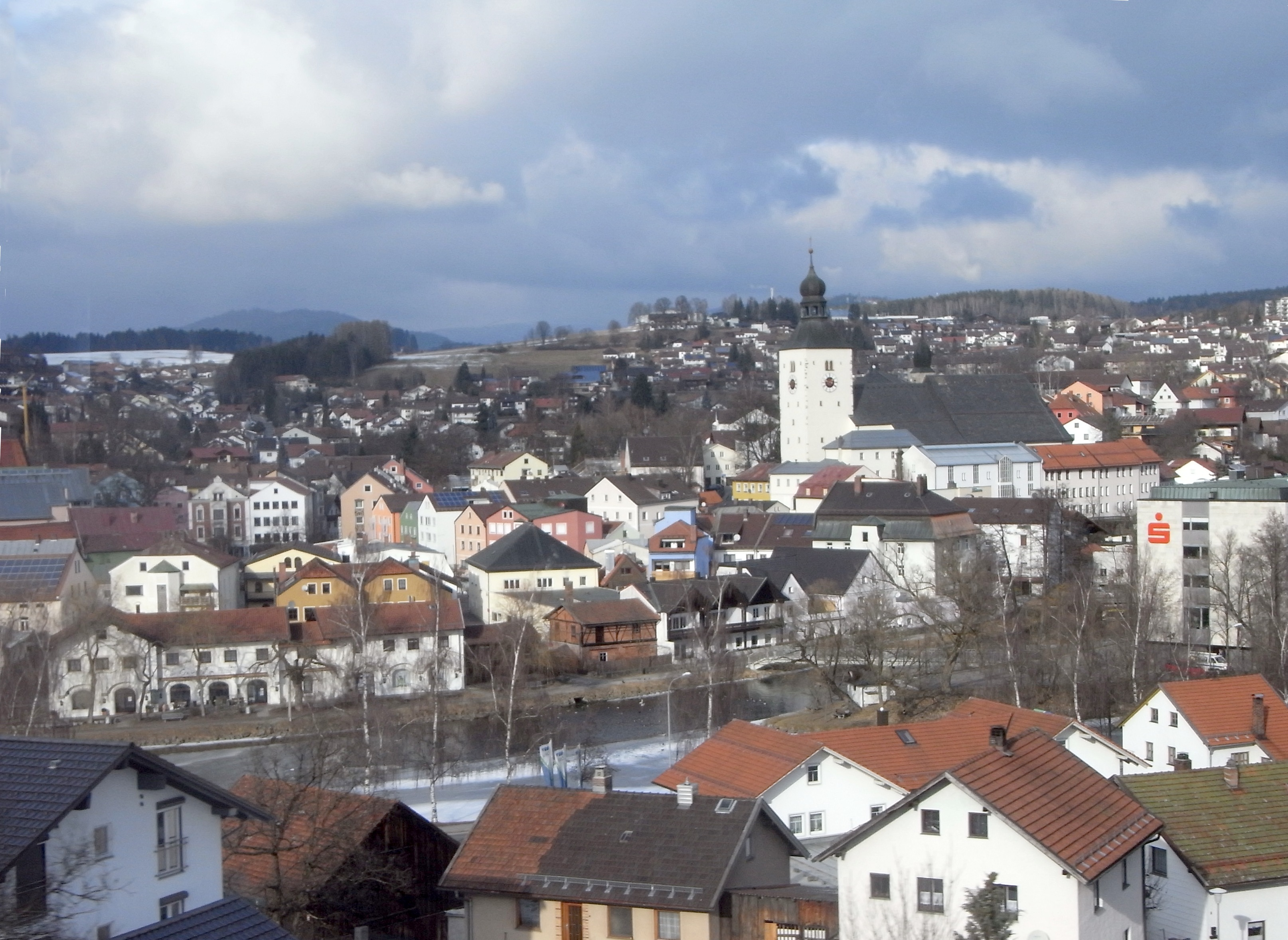
- Regen

- Coat of arms

- Location of Regen within Regen district
- Interactive map of Regen
- Location within Germany Location within Bavaria
- Coordinates: 48°58′N 13°8′E
- Country: Germany
- State: Bavaria
- Admin. region: Lower Bavaria
- District: Regen
- Subdivisions: 59 districts

Government
  - Mayor (2020–26): Andreas Kroner (SPD)

Area
  - Total: 65.14 km^{2} (25.15 sq mi)
- Elevation: 530 m (1,740 ft)

Population (2025-12-31)
  - Total: 10,951
  - Density: 168.1/km^{2} (435.4/sq mi)
- Time zone: UTC+01:00 (CET)
  - Summer (DST): UTC+02:00 (CEST)
- Postal codes: 94209
- Dialling codes: 09921
- Vehicle registration: REG
- Website: www.regen.de

Regen (German pronunciation: [ˈʁeːɡn̩]; Northern Bavarian: Reng) is a town in Bavaria, Germany, and the district town of the district of Regen.

== Geography ==
Regen is situated on the great Regen River, located in the Bavarian Forest.

=== Divisions ===
Originally the town consisted of 4 districts: Bürgerholz, Grubhügel, Riedham and St. Johann.

After a governmental reform the villages of:

- Aden
- Augrub
- Bärndorf
- Bettmannsäge
- Dreieck
- Ebenhof
- Ecklend
- Edhof
- Eggenried
- Finkenried
- Frauenmühle
- Großseiboldsried
- Huberhof
- Kagerhof
- Kattersdorf
- Kerschlhöh
- Kleinseiboldsried
- Kreuzerhof
- Kühhof
- March
- Maschenberg
- Matzelsried
- Metten
- Neigerhöhe
- Neigermühle
- Neusohl
- Obermitterdorf
- Oberneumais
- Oleumhütte
- Pfistermühle
- Pometsau
- Poschetsried
- Reinhartsmais
- Richtplatz
- Rinchnachmündt
- Rohrbach
- Sallitz
- Schauerhof
- Schlossau
- Schochert
- Schollenried
- Schönhöh
- Schützenhof
- Schwaighof
- Schweinhütt
- Spitalhof
- Sumpering
- Tausendbach
- Thanhof
- Thurnhof
- Weißenstein
- Weißensteiner-Au
- Wickersdorf
- Wieshof and Windschnur

were added.

== Population development ==
- 1828: 1196
- 1904: 2366
- 1974: 9029
- 2005: 12.553
- 2015: 10.855

== International relations ==
Regen is twinned with:

- Eschwege, Germany, since 1997
- Mirebeau, France
- Roth bei Nürnberg, Germany

== Notable places ==
The "Niederbayrisches Landwirtschaftsmuseum" is a museum showing the history of agriculture and society in Lower Bavaria from the 18th and 19th century.

The "Fressendes Haus" is a former domicile of the poets Clara Nordström (1886–1962) and Siegfried von Vegesack (1888–1974), which was transformed in a museum in 1984 presenting different expositions of historical art and the archeological excavations at the castle ruin of Weißenstein.

=== Natural monuments ===
- The Pfahl is a 150-kilometre-long quartz ridge. In the vicinity of Weißenstein it reaches its highest point at 750 metres at the site of Weißenstein Castle.

== Economy ==
Tourism figures largely in the local economy, with over 64,000 visitors accounting for 220,000 over-night stays last year.

=== Personalities ===
- Clara Nordström, Swedish writer (1886-1962)
