= Büchelstein =

Mountain in Germany

- Location within Bavaria

Highest point
- Elevation: 832 m above sea level (NN) (2,730 ft)
- Coordinates: 48°48′29″N 13°10′33″E

Geography
- Location: Bavaria, Germany
- Parent range: Bavarian Forest

Geology
- Rock type: gneiss

The Büchelstein is a mountain, 832 m above sea level (NN) high, in the southern Bavarian Forest near the higher peak of the Brotjacklriegel.

Its forested slopes rise above the bowl of the Lallinger Winkel in the east and the village of Grattersdorf to the north. Just below the highest point is a lookout rock with a large summit cross and wide panoramas over parts of Lower Bavaria. In föhn conditions in autumn even the northern chain of the Alps may be seen from the Dachstein to the Zugspitze. In addition there is a starting point here for hang gliders, that take off in suitable right thermal conditions. Several very short paths lead to the Büchelstein from Grattersdorf, Kerschbaum or Langfurth and the E8 European long distance path passes close to the lookout rocks.

The Büchelstein may have given its name to the local dish known as Pichelsteiner Eintopf. On 17 June 1839, on the initiative of the Grafenau Landrichter, Jakob Strelin, the first Büchelstein Festival (Büchelsteiner Fest) was celebrated. It later moved to Grattersdorf.
