= Nikujaga =

Japanese meat and potato dish

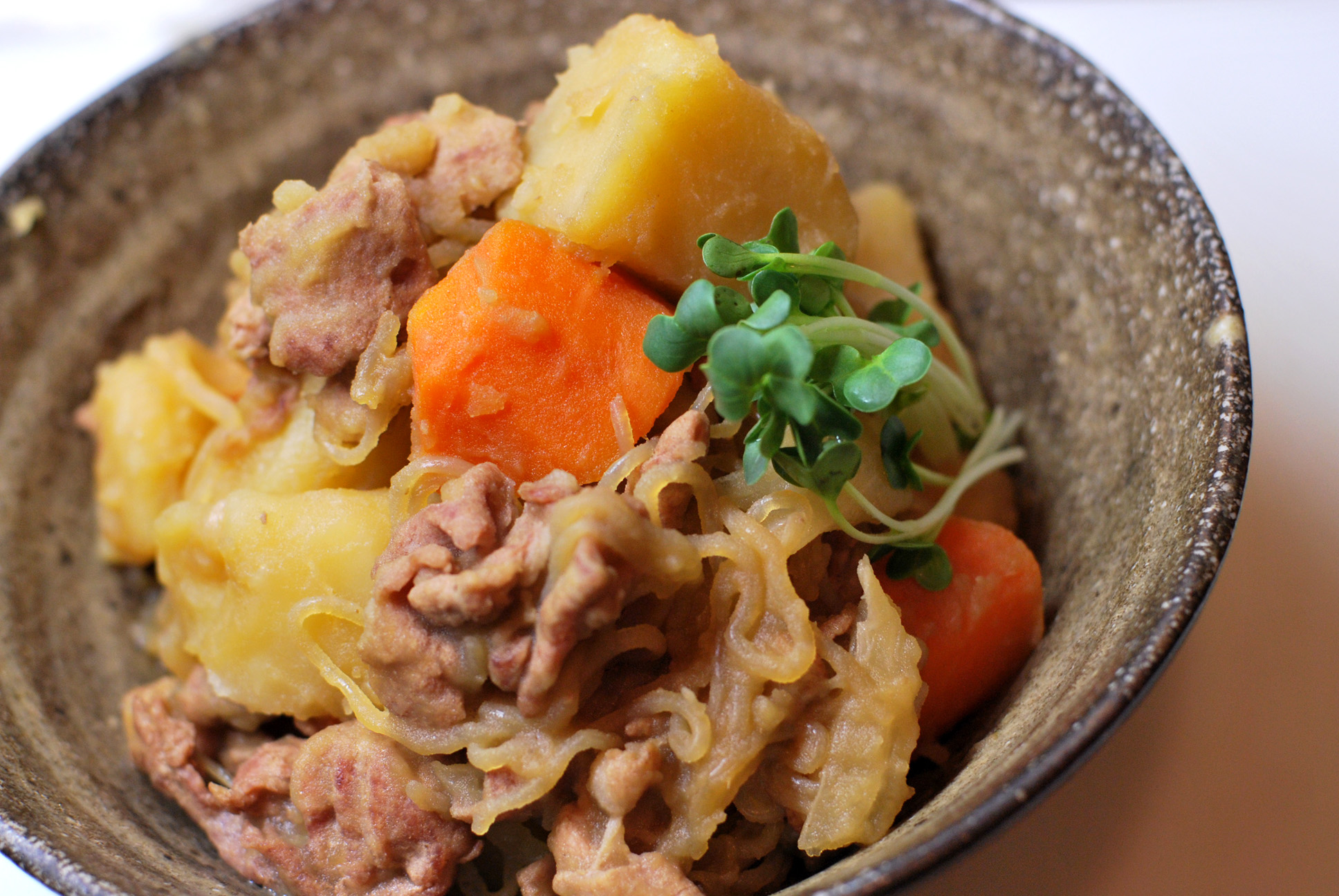
- Place of origin: Japan
- Main ingredients: Meat (sliced or ground beef, or pork), potatoes, onion, sweetened soy sauce and mirin

Nikujaga (肉じゃが; lit. 'meat [and] potatoes' (Note: The jaga of "nikujaga" is an abbreviation of jagaimo (ジャガ芋; lit. 'Jakarta tuber/root vegetable', 'potato'))) is a Japanese dish of meat, potatoes, and onions stewed in dashi, soy sauce, mirin, and sugar, sometimes with ito konnyaku and vegetables like carrots. Nikujaga is a kind of nimono. It is usually boiled until most of the liquid has been reduced. Thinly sliced beef is the most common meat used, although minced or ground beef is also popular. Pork is often used instead of beef in eastern Japan. During World War II, it was served as a navy dish. Today, people make it as one of the home dishes and eat it regardless of seasons. Nikujaga is a common home-cooked winter dish, served with a bowl of white rice and miso soup. It is also sometimes seen in izakayas.

== History ==
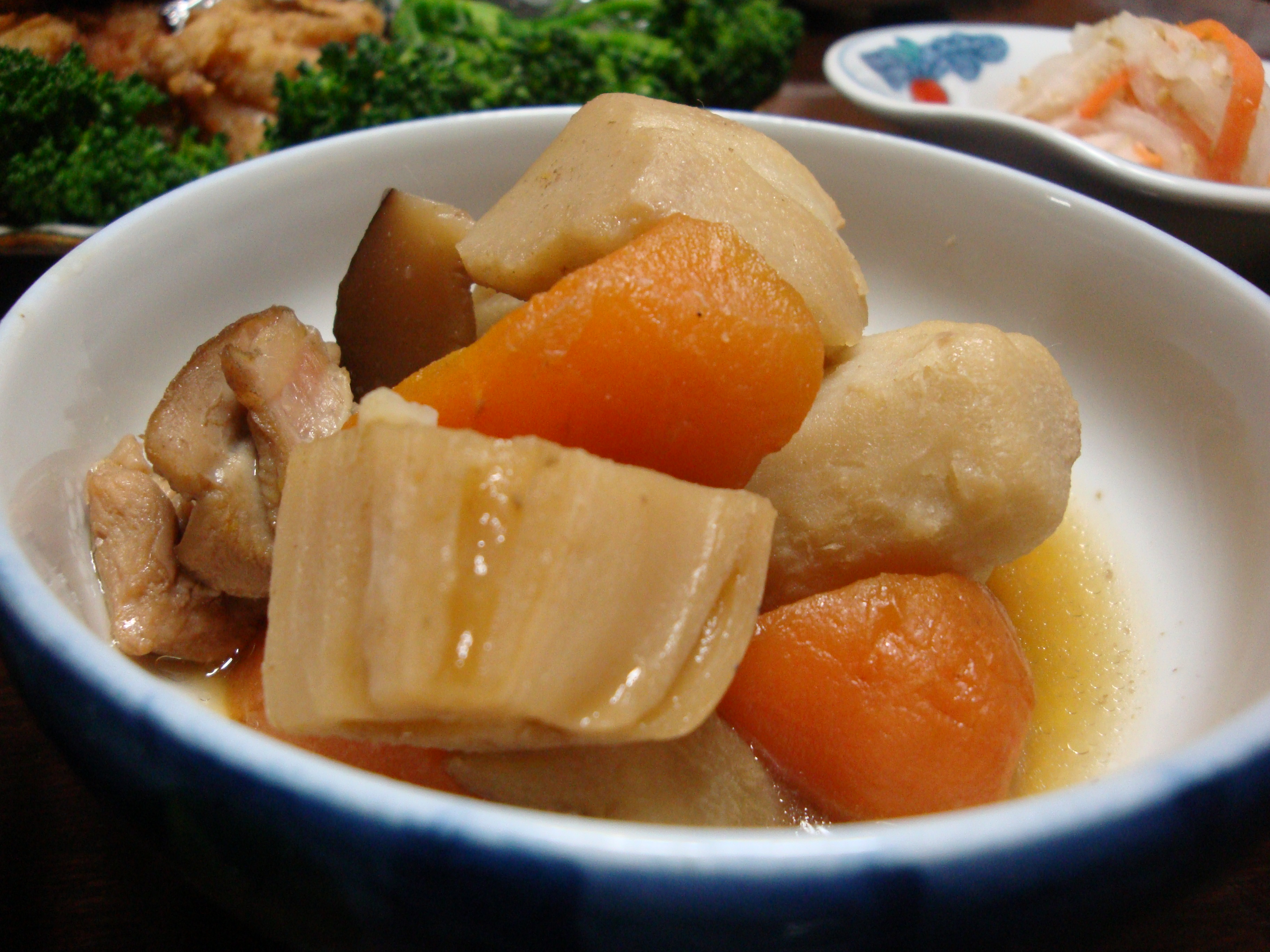

Nikujaga was invented by chefs of the Imperial Japanese Navy in the late 19th century. One story is that in 1895, Tōgō Heihachirō ordered naval cooks to create a version of the beef stews as served in the British Royal Navy. Tōgō was stationed in Maizuru, Kyoto, which established this Imperial Japanese Navy base as the birthplace of nikujaga.

The municipal government of Kure, Hiroshima, responded in 1898 with a competing claim that Tōgō commissioned the dish while serving as chief of staff of the Kure naval base.

== Preserve and Pass Down the Tradition ==
It is served in the restaurant. Also, four cities in Kure City, Maiduru City, Yokosuka City, and Sasebo City take turns hosting "Four Former Naval Port Cities Gourmet Exchange” each year. In Kure City, the "Kure Food Festival" is held, where people can enjoy local dishes such as nikujaga and Japan Maritime Self-Defense Force curry. Nikujaga from Kure is also served in elementary school lunches.

== Gallery ==
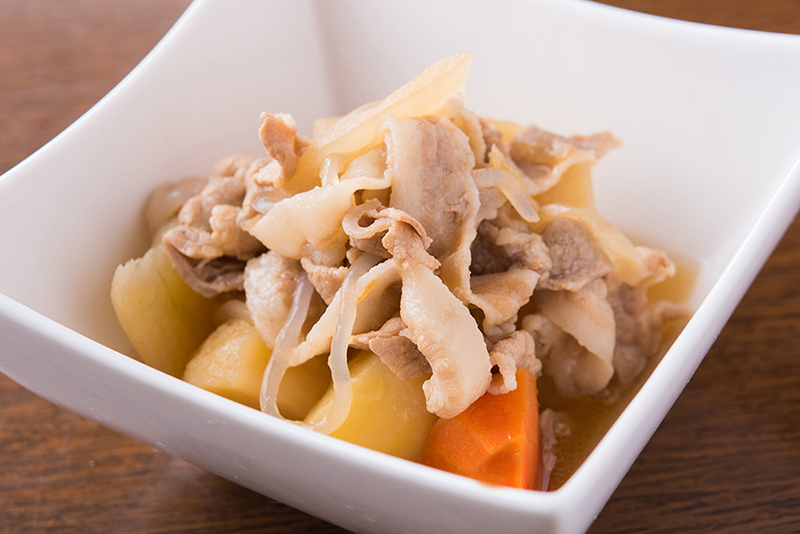

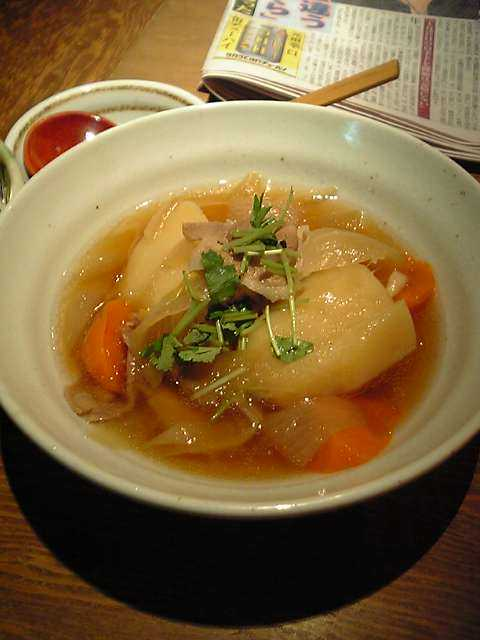

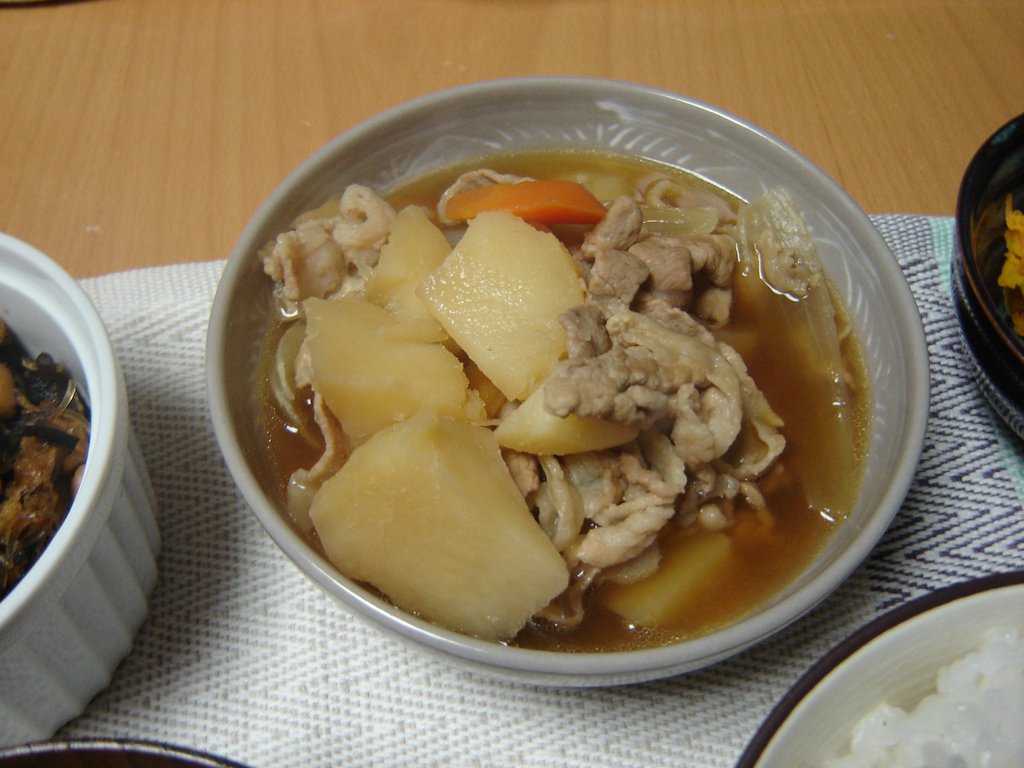

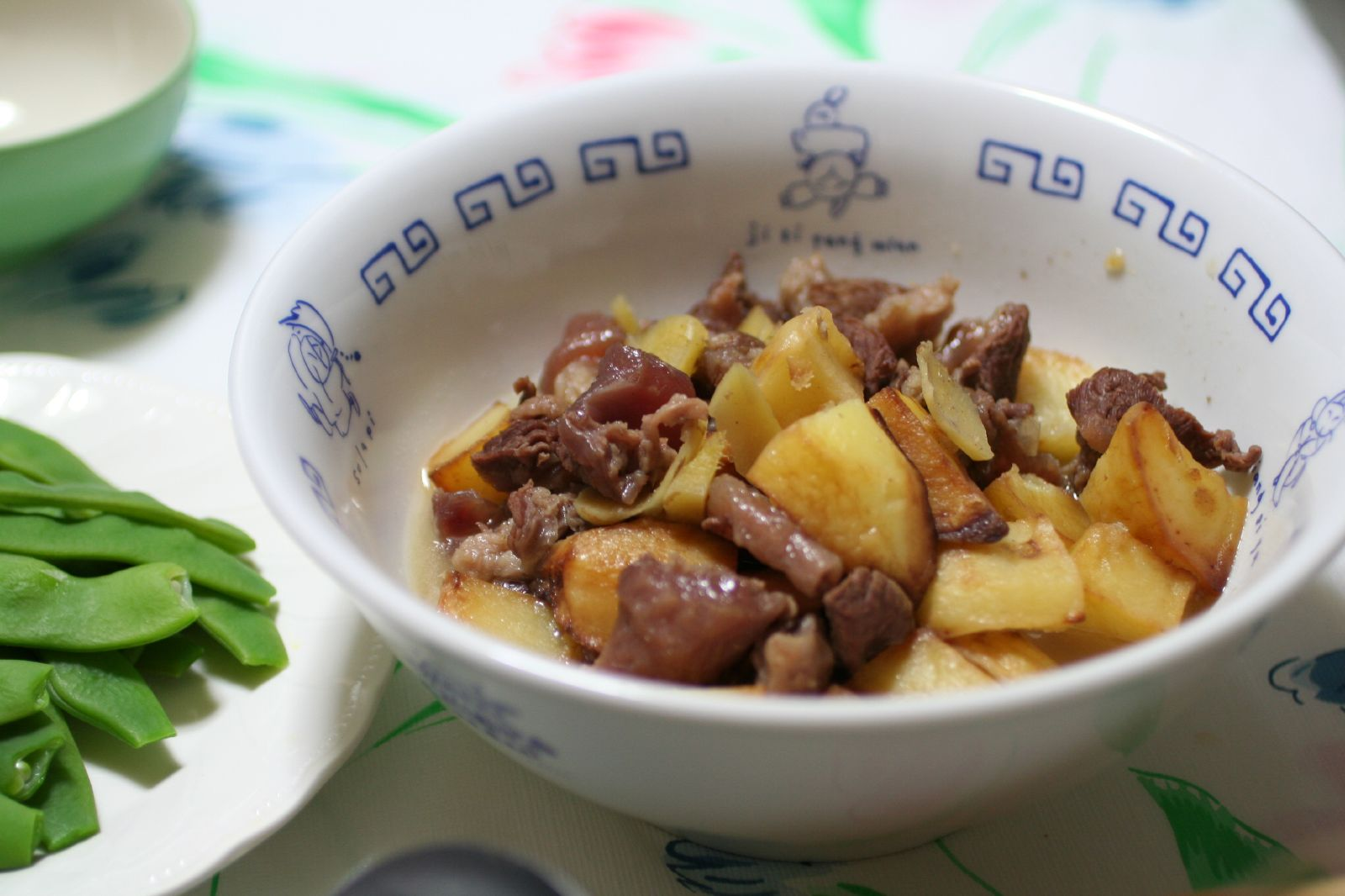

== See also ==
- Bosnian pot
- Beef bourguignon
- List of Japanese soups and stews
- List of soups
- Pichelsteiner
- Pot roast
- Pot-au-feu
- List of meat and potato dishes
