= Aschenstein =

Mountain in Germany

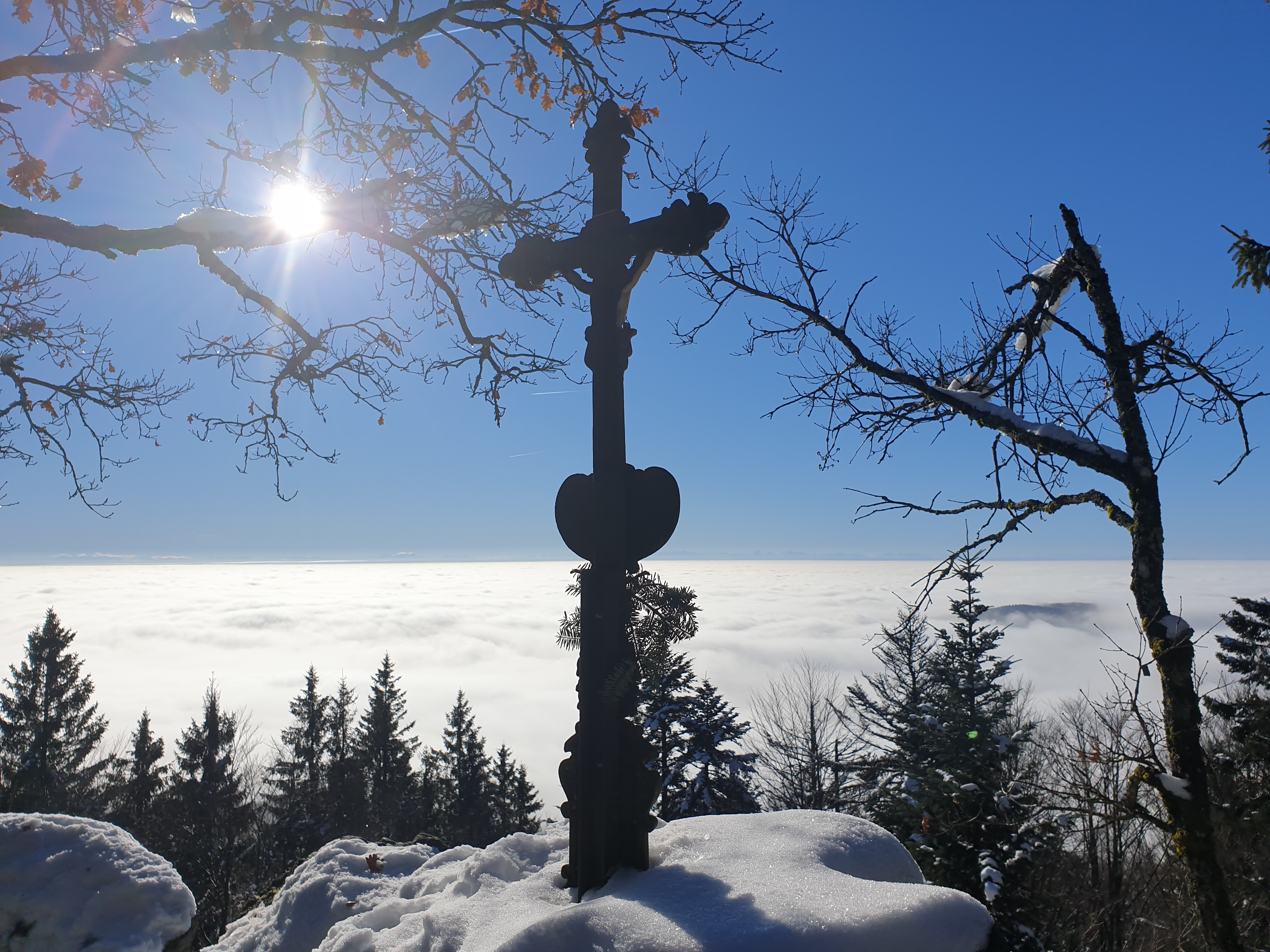
- View from the Kleiner Aschenstein viewing rock

Highest point
- Elevation: 945 m (3,100 ft)
- Coordinates: 48°49′06″N 13°15′24″E

Geography
- Location within Bavaria
- Location: Bavaria, Germany
- Parent range: Bavarian Forest

Geology
- Rock type: Gneiss

The Aschenstein is a 945-metre-high mountain in the western chain of the Bavarian Forest above the village of Zenting.

== Description ==
Because better-known summits like the Brotjacklriegel or the Geißlstein are in its immediate vicinity, the unimposing Aschenstein is less often visited. No waymarked paths lead up to its rocky summit with its small summit cross and hunting hut, but it is quickly reached from the Geißlstein over trackless terrain. Because trees have grown on the southern side, there are no longer any views on that side.

On an eminence between the Aschenstein and Geißlstein is a lookout rock with a cross. This unnamed spot was called the Little Aschenstein (Kleiner Aschenstein) by Zenting's village council at its meeting on 7 December 2009. On the Little Aschenstein is a small summit cross and a summit register.

To the south the vista opens up over the entire Dreiburgenland with Thurmansbang and Zenting. When there are föhn weather conditions the view extends as far as the mountains of the Northern Limestone Alps from the Dachstein to the Zugspitze. Due to the short ascents from Daxtein, Haunstein, Bärndorf, Winden or Fradlberg, the Geißlstein is more often frequented.
