= Elephant Rally =

Motorcycle rally

Elephant Rally Elefantentreffen
- Genre: Motorcycle rally
- Dates: January or February
- Locations: Near Thurmansbang, Bavarian Forest, Germany
- Founded: 1956
- Attendance: 5,000-10,000
- Patron: Federal Association of Motorcycle Riders
- Website: www.bvdm.de

The Elephant Rally, or Elefantentreffen, is a winter motorcycle rally, which takes place on the first weekend in February or on the last weekend in January annually in a valley between the towns of Thurmansbang and Solla in the Bavarian Forest in Germany. It is organized by the Federal Association of Motorcycle Riders in Germany.

Since 1989 it has taken place in the Bavarian forest, near the Czech border, where snow is guaranteed. Each year between 5,000 and 10,000 riders from all over Europe participate, some bringing modified motorcycles and special designs.

== History ==
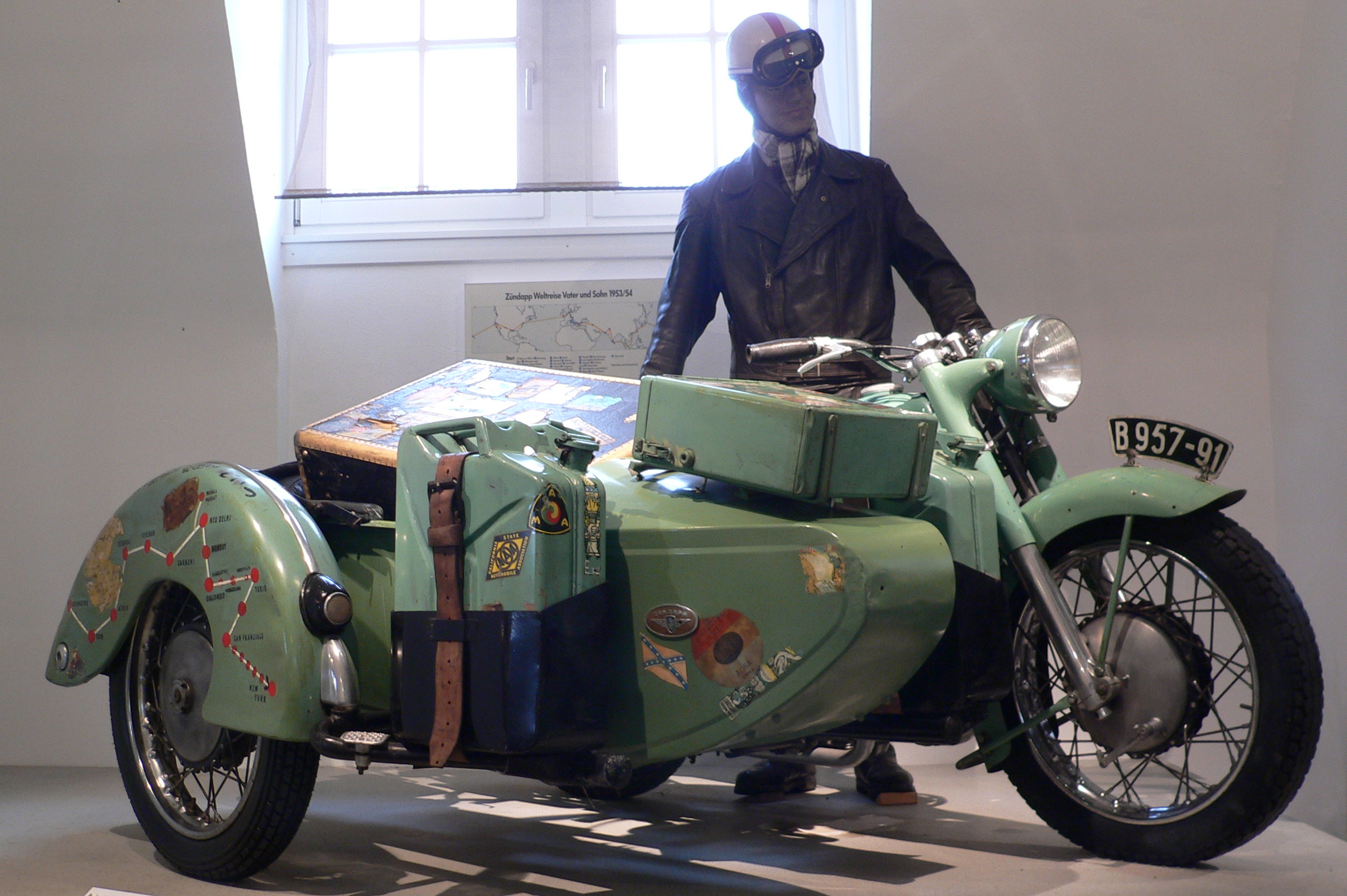
Zündapp KS601

The meeting was created in 1956 by Ernst Leverkus, who had organized it as meeting for winter-resilient drivers of the well-known Zündapp KS 601 motorcycle-sidecar combination. The KS 601 (the "Green elephant") gave its name to the meeting.

Initially from 1956 the meeting took place at the Solitude Racetrack near Stuttgart. After changing places the organizer, BVDM, took over 1961 and placed the meeting at the Nürburgring. After serious problems and organizational changes in 1978 a transfer took place to the Salzburgring — in the first year still as an emergency meeting with 400 participants, but, starting in 1979, it became a regular meeting. Attendance is now around 5,000.

In 1988 the rally was canceled, as BVDM no longer wished to bear the liability and risk for it. At the Salzburgring only a privately organized emergency meeting took place. Since 1989 the meeting has taken place in the same area as the Stock Car club. The most important change is the complete prohibition of all vehicles except motorcycles for several kilometers around the periphery of the meeting area.

New regulations called Zurück für die Zukunft, or "Backwards for the Future" in English, were established for the 2015 rally to enforce a return to the event's spartan roots. The rules are meant to ensure that participants do not stage elaborate tents with furnaces or trailer their vehicles to the event. They are now required not to stop to unload trailers or lorries in surrounding towns and roads, to only bring street-legal motorcycles or sidecars on the campsite, and to carry all their camping gear on motorcycles.

== Old Elephant Rally ==
After the rally was canceled in 1988, some private individuals organized a parallel alternative meeting, which has taken place since then each year. Since 1990 it is held at the Nürburgring under the name Altes Elefantentreffen (Old Elephant Rally). It takes place as a rule two weeks after the Elephant Rally.
