= Nimono =

Japanese simmered dish

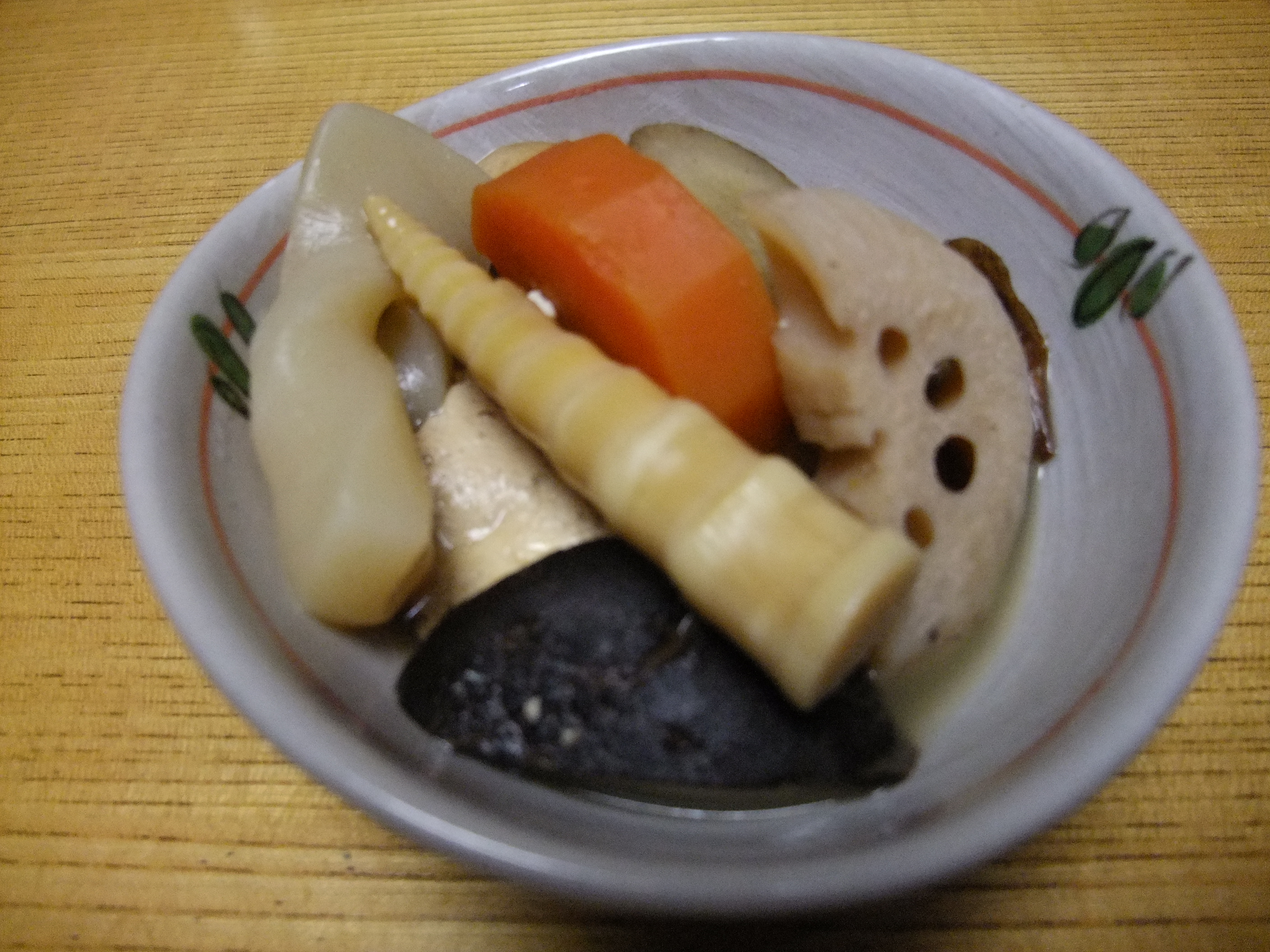
- Nishime, a nimono of various vegetables (including bamboo shoot, lotus root and shiitake) prepared in the northern Aomori Prefecture
- Course: Side dish
- Place of origin: Japan
- Region or state: Japanese-speaking areas
- Main ingredients: Vegetable or seafood, dashi, sake, soy sauce, mirin
- Similar dishes: Jorim

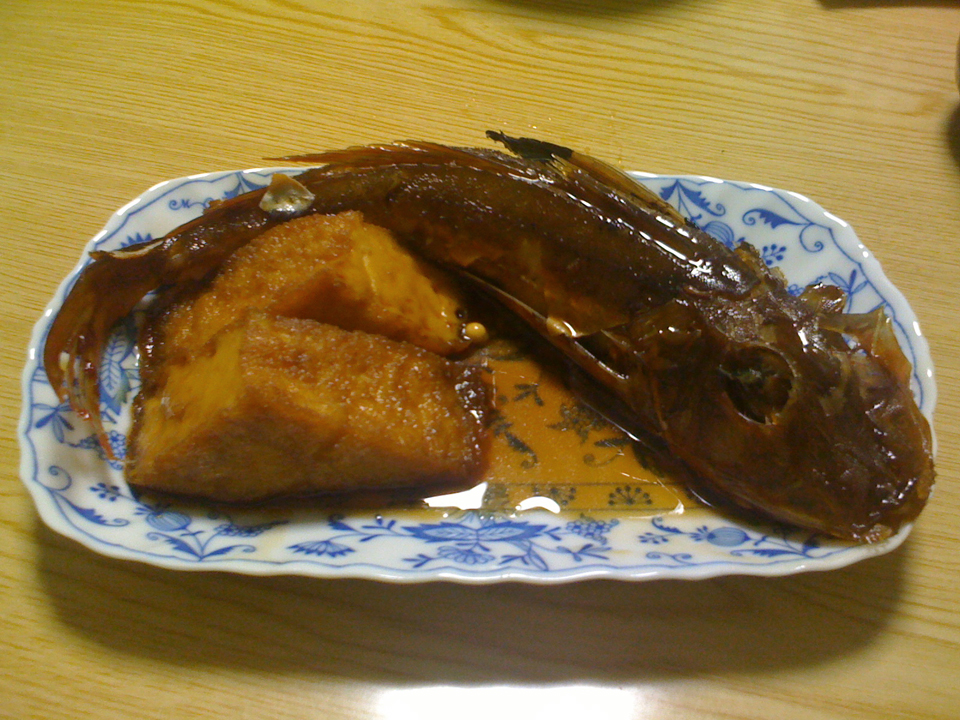
Boiled gurnard with ginger, soy sauce, mirin, sugar, sake, and water.

Nimono (煮物) is a simmered dish in Japanese cuisine. A nimono generally consists of a base ingredient simmered in shiru stock and seasoned with sake, soy sauce, mirin and a small amount of sweetening. The nimono is simmered in the shiru over a period of time until the liquid is absorbed into the base ingredient or evaporated. The base ingredient for a nimono is typically a vegetable, fish, seafood, or tofu, or some combination of these. The shiru stock for a nimono is generally dashi. Other than sake and soy sauce, the stock can be further flavored with mirin, sugar, salt, vinegar, miso, or other condiments.

== Types ==
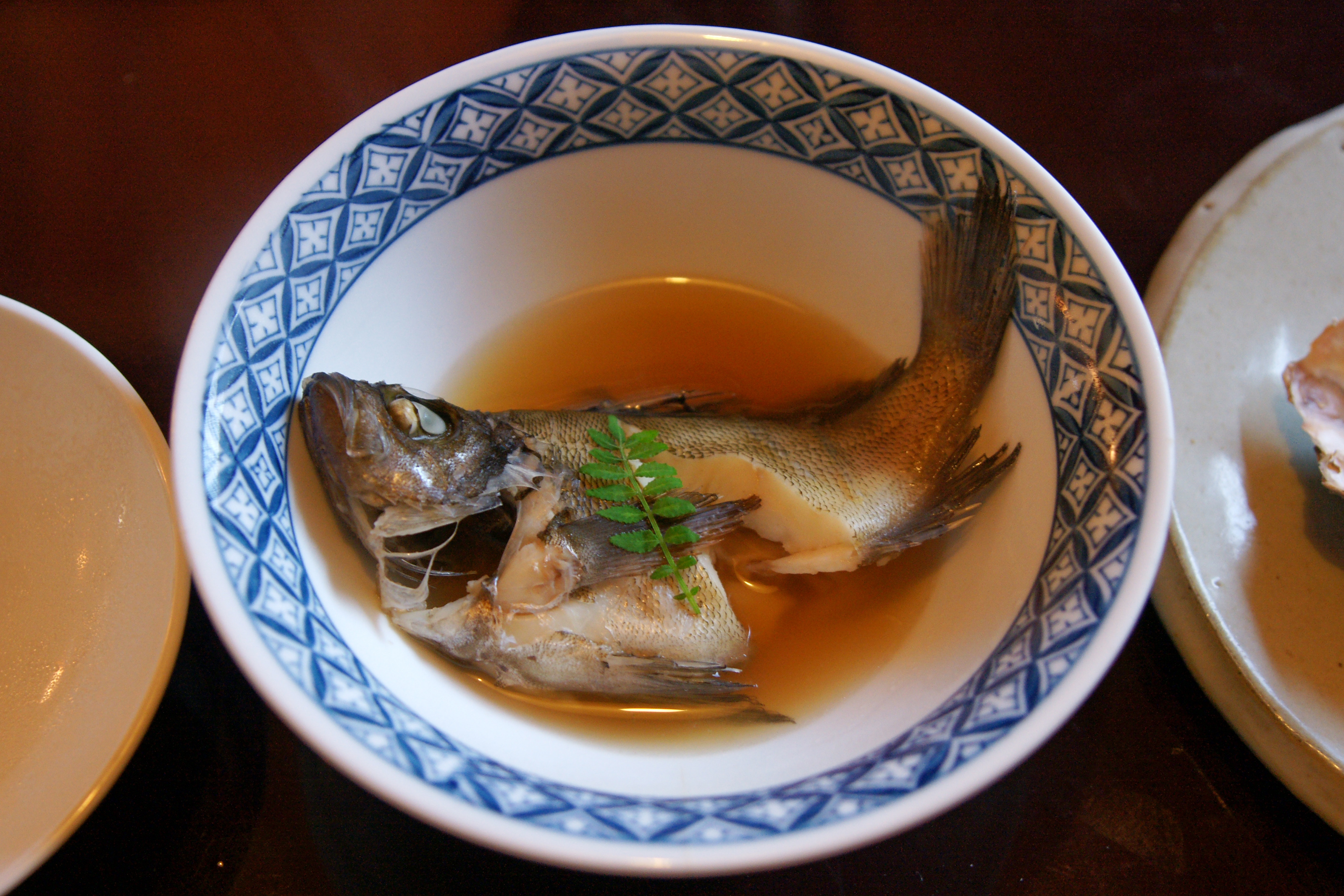
Boiled sea perch with ginger, soy sauce, mirin, sugar, sake, and water

- Misoni (味噌煮), also misodaki (味噌炊き): fish, but sometimes vegetables, simmered in a mixture of miso and dashi.
- Nikujaga (肉じゃが): beef and potato stew, flavoured with sweet soy sauce.
- Nizakana (煮魚): fish poached in a broth of sweetened dashi, sometimes with miso, also referred to as nitsuke (煮付け). The dish first appears in cookbooks in the early 18th century.
- Kakuni (角煮): chunks of pork belly stewed in soy, mirin and sake with large pieces of daikon and whole boiled eggs. The Okinawan variation, using awamori, soy sauce and miso, is known as rafuti.
- Sōki (ソーキ): Okinawan dish of pork stewed with bone.
- Nabemono (鍋物): one-pot meal.
  - Oden (おでん): a winter one-pot meal.
- Nishime (煮染め): vegetables (such as carrots, taro, lotus root, and konnyaku), simmered in soy sauce and water almost to dryness.

== See also ==
- Japanese cuisine
- Acqua pazza
- Pot-au-feu
- Eintopf
- Irish stew

== Bibliography ==
- Hosking, Richard (2000). At the Japanese Table. Images of Asia. New York: Oxford University Press. ISBN 978-0-195-90980-7. LCCN 00058458. OCLC 44579064.
- Ashkenazi, Michael; Jacob, Jeanne (2000). The Essence Of Japanese Cuisine: an Essay On Food And Culture. Richmond, Surrey: Curzon. ISBN 978-0-700-71085-0. OCLC 44937736.
