= Zenting =

- Municipality
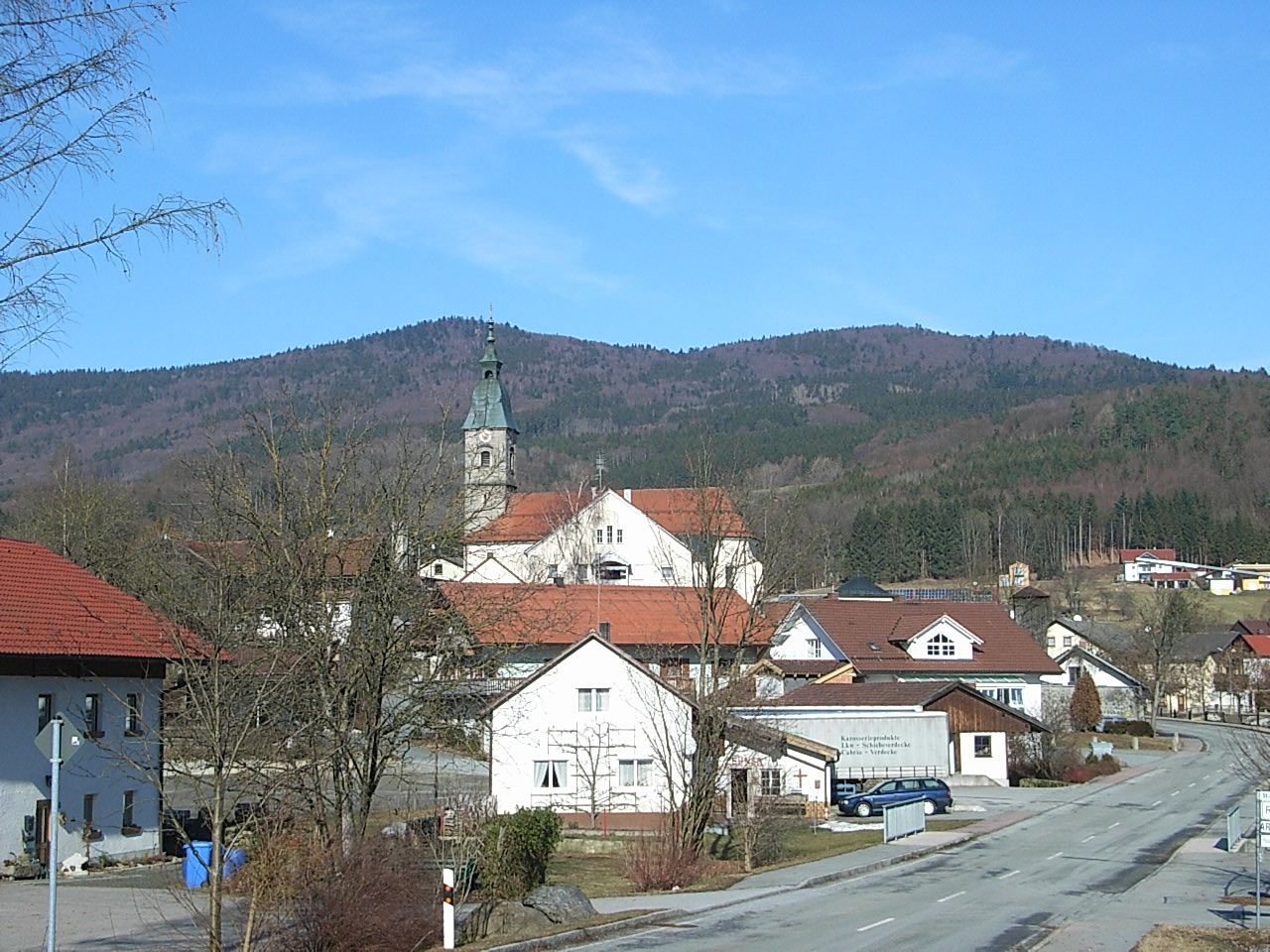
- View of Zenting. Behind: the Aschenstein (l) and the Geißlstein

- Coat of arms

- Location of Zenting within Freyung-Grafenau district
- Interactive map of Zenting
- Location within Germany Location within Bavaria
- Coordinates: 48°48′N 13°16′E
- Country: Germany
- State: Bavaria
- Admin. region: Niederbayern
- District: Freyung-Grafenau
- Municipal assoc.: Thurmansbang

Government
  - Mayor (2020–26): Dirk Rohowski (FW)

Area
  - Total: 21.74 km^{2} (8.39 sq mi)
- Elevation: 450 m (1,480 ft)

Population (2025-12-31)
  - Total: 1,148
  - Density: 52.81/km^{2} (136.8/sq mi)
- Time zone: UTC+01:00 (CET)
  - Summer (DST): UTC+02:00 (CEST)
- Postal codes: 94579
- Dialling codes: 09907
- Vehicle registration: FRG
- Website: www.zenting.de

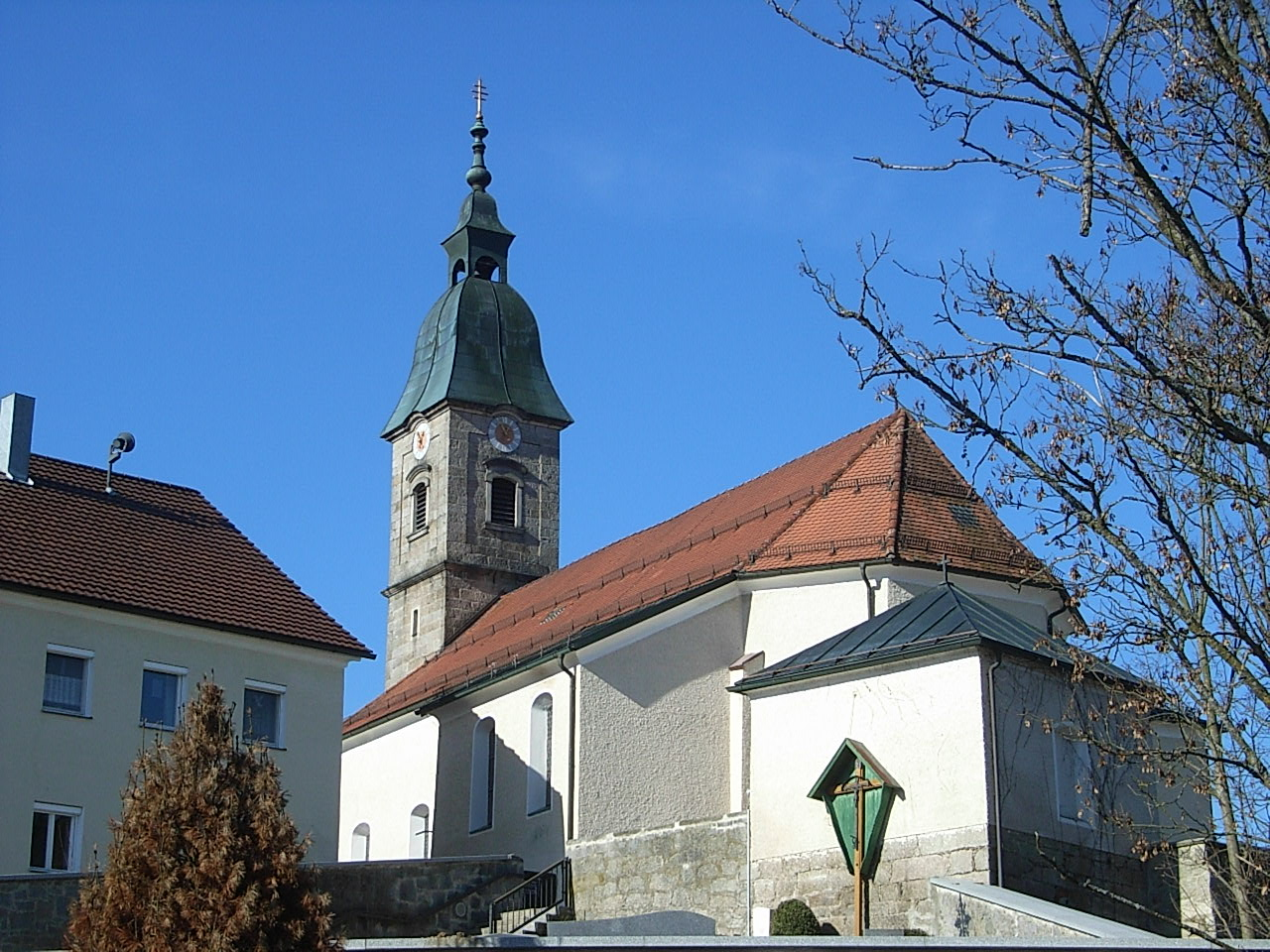
The parish church of Zenting

Zenting is a municipality in the district of Freyung-Grafenau in Bavaria in Germany.

== Location ==
This municipality lies in the region of the Danube Forest (Donau-Wald) in the middle of the Bavarian Forest. The village nestles in a sunny, south-facing bowl, above which the Brotjacklriegel (1,016 m) and Aschenstein (945 m) tower to the north. Zenting is located around 35 km NW of Passau, 13 km from Tittling, 18 km SW of Grafenau, 26 km N of Vilshofen an der Donau and 15 km from the A 3 (Iggensbach exit).
