= Irish stew =

Irish meat and vegetable stew

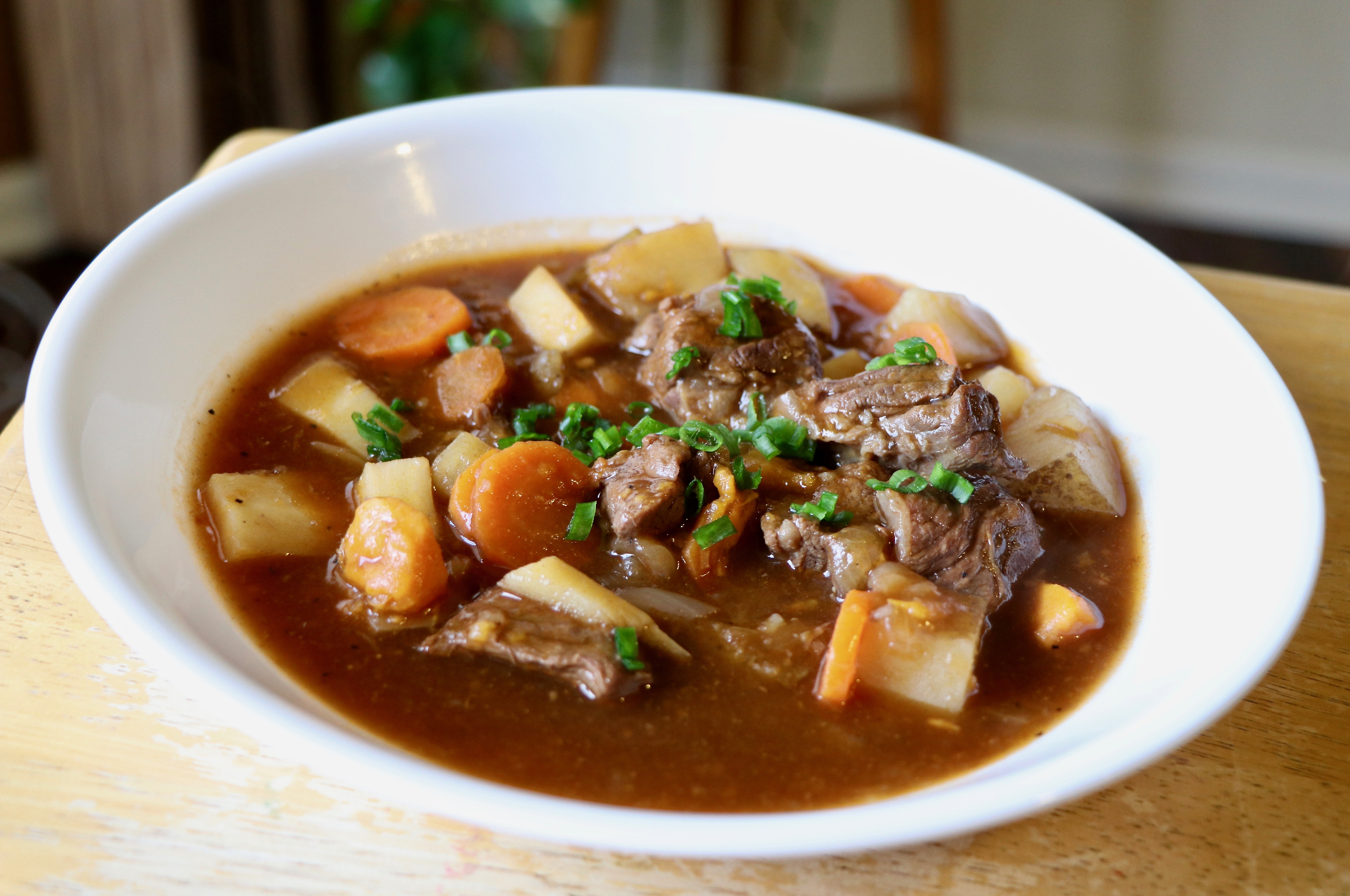
- A plate of Irish stew
- Type: Stew
- Course: Main
- Place of origin: Ireland
- Serving temperature: Hot
- Main ingredients: Lamb or beef, potatoes, carrots, onions, parsley, cooking wine (sometimes), beer (sometimes)

Irish stew (Irish: stobhach Gaelach) or stobhach is a stew from Ireland that is traditionally made with root vegetables and lamb or mutton, but in modern times also it is commonly made with beef. As in all traditional folk dishes, the exact recipe is not consistent from time to time or place to place. Basic ingredients include lamb or mutton (mutton is used as it comes from less tender sheep over a year old, is fattier, and has a stronger flavour; mutton was cheaper and more common in less-affluent times), as well as potatoes, onions, and parsley. It may sometimes also include carrots. Irish stew is also made with kid. Irish stew is considered a national dish of Ireland.

Irish stew is a celebrated Irish dish, yet its composition is a matter of dispute. Purists maintain that the only acceptable and traditional ingredients are neck mutton chops or kid, potatoes, onions, and water. Others would add such items as carrots, turnips, and pearl barley; but the purists maintain that they spoil the true flavour of the dish. The ingredients are boiled and simmered slowly for up to two hours. Salt can be added before or after the cooking. Mutton was the dominant ingredient because the economic importance of sheep lay in their wool and milk produce, and this ensured that only old or economically non-viable animals ended up in the cooking pot, where they needed hours of slow cooking. Irish stew is the product of a culinary tradition that relied almost exclusively on cooking over an open fire. It seems that Irish stew was recognised as early as about 1800.

== History ==
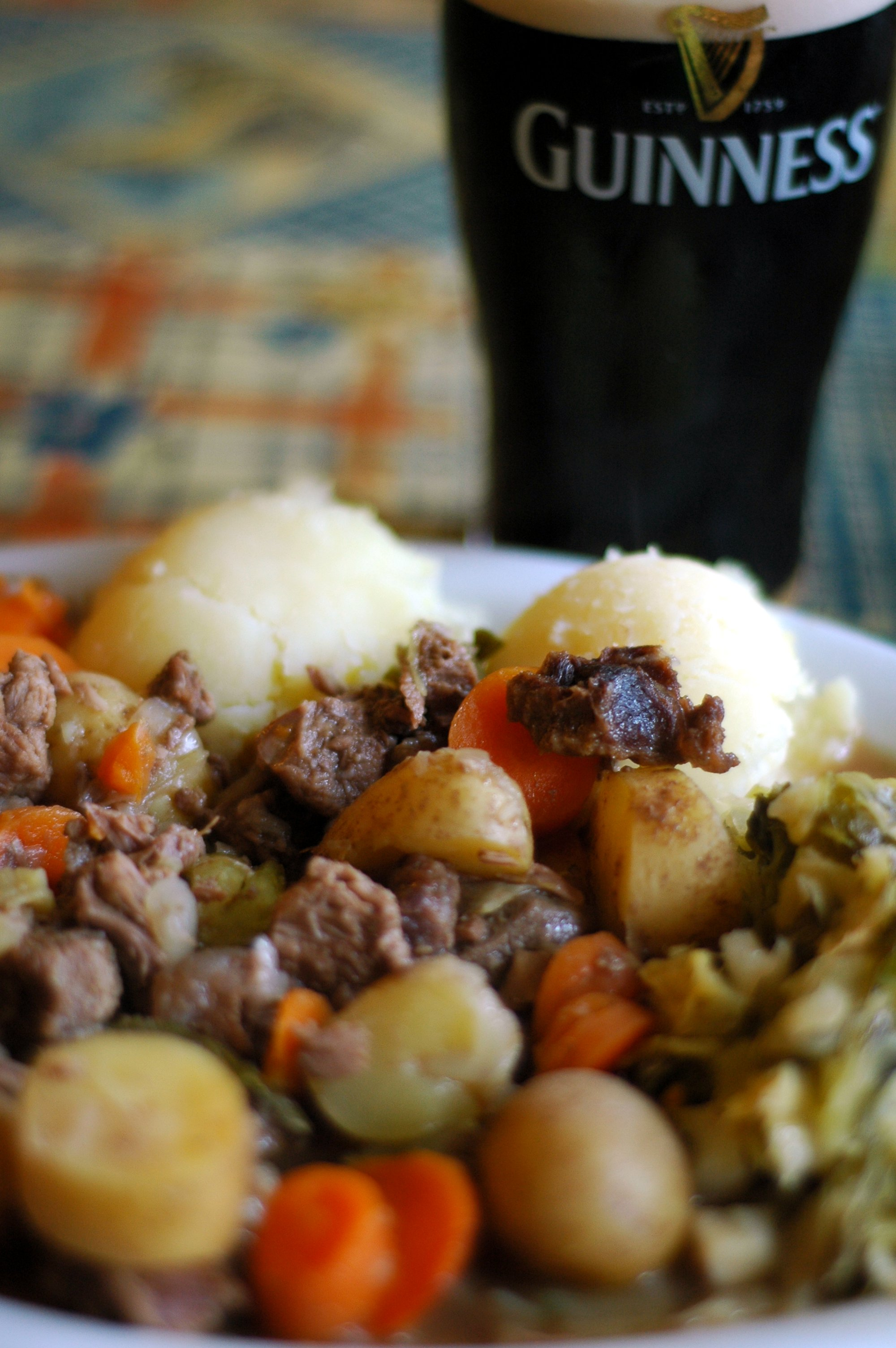
Close-up view of an Irish stew, with a Guinness stout

Stewing is an ancient method of cooking meats that is common throughout the world. After the idea of the cauldron was imported from continental Europe and Britain, the cauldron (along with the already established spit) became the dominant cooking tool in ancient Ireland, with ovens being practically unknown to the ancient Gaels. The cauldron, along with flesh-hooks for suspending the meat, eventually became preferred over the spit for feasting purposes, as evidenced by archaeological findings that indicate a predominance of flesh hooks over roasting spits in Ireland and Britain. Many food historians believe that goat was originally the meat of choice, eventually being supplanted by beef and mutton.

The root vegetables and meat (originally goat) for the stew were then all in place, save for the potato, which was introduced to Ireland around the 16th century during the Columbian exchange.

Old Irish recipes are scarce, due to poor documentation, but the first such recipe for Irish stew dates to the 1600s, from southern Ireland, by the O'Brien family. First compiled by the Countess of Thomond, 1684–1734. It says, "To make an Irish stew of mutton Season the bones of a neck of mutton with pepper and salt, put it down with a layer of onions, put them in covered stew pan, to keep in the steam & as much water as will cover it. The chops must be very tender, but as they are all put down together, the potatoes must be taken out first, as they burst".

A 19th-century American recipe was recorded by Helen Stuart Campbell, a professor of domestic science at Kansas State Agricultural College. According to Campbell the stew was made with boneless beef or mutton, trimmed of fat and cut into small cubes, less than one inch square. To its broth were added onions and potatoes, and carrots (if beef was used), with a simple seasoning of salt and pepper. This stew was gently simmered for several hours and thickened with flour before serving.

== Laws and regulations ==
=== Canada ===
According to Canadian regulations, for commercially produced Irish stew to be labeled as such, it must contain at least 20% mutton, lamb and/or beef, and 30% vegetables. It may also include gravy, salt, various seasonings, and spices.

== See also ==
- Bosnian pot
- Cawl
- Fårikål
- Galbi-tang
- Goat water
- List of meat and potato dishes
- List of Ireland-related topics
- List of Irish dishes
- List of stews
- Pichelsteiner
- Scotch broth
- Stone soup

== General and cited references ==
- Davidson, Alan (2006). "Irish stew". In Jaine, Tom (ed.). Oxford Companion to Food (2nd ed.). Oxford: Oxford University Press. ISBN 9780192806819. OCLC 803887690.
