= Goat water =

Montserrat stew

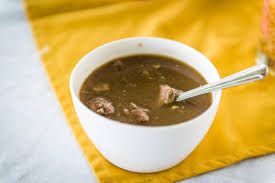
- Goat water in Saint Kitts and Nevis
- Type: Stew
- Place of origin: Montserrat
- Region or state: Caribbean
- Main ingredients: Goat meat
- Variations: Meat

Goat water, also referred to as kiddy stew, is a stew that is a part of the national cuisine of the Caribbean island of Montserrat. It has been described as a national dish, or national stew, of Montserrat but is also prepared in other Caribbean countries. As part of Montserrat's cultural heritage, the dish is popularly believed to have its origins in Irish cuisine, specifically in traditional Irish stew.

== Origin ==
Regarded as "almost a national food, or drink, with the Montserratians," an early documented recipe for goat water was prominently featured in The Montserrat Cookbook, published in 1969 by Letchworth Press for the benefit of the Old People's Welfare Association. Its popularity over the decades has led to it being commonly described as Montserrat's national dish. The Montserrat Tourism Authority has stated that to be authentic, goat water must be made with meat from a male goat.

The popular consensus is that goat water was derived from Irish stew but with goat meat instead of lamb. John Messenger, professor of folklore, anthropology, and African studies at Indiana University, classified goat water as "an Irish stew made with goat meat" and stated that an identical recipe was taught to his wife by the wife of a Connemara farmer.

Goat water is also known and eaten in other Caribbean countries, including Dominica and most prominently in Saint Kitts and Nevis.

== Preparation ==
Goat water is prepared with cubed goat (kid) meat and served with white rice and boiled dasheen leaves. It may also be served with crusty bread rolls. The goat meat is stewed without removing the bones; some recipes specifically call for goat neck bones. Other recipes include ingredients such as potatoes, breadfruit, green pawpaw (papaya), and dumplings in a tomato base. Optionally, goat water may include a splash of rum.

Goat water is served at many Montserratian celebrations including weddings, parties, and funerals. The Montserrat Tourism Authority recommends cooking it over a wood fire so the smoke enhances the stew's flavor.

== See also ==
- Caribbean cuisine
- List of stews
