= Thurmansbang (Verwaltungsgemeinschaft) =

- Verwaltungsgemeinschaft
- Location of Thurmansbang within Freyung-Grafenau district
- Interactive map of Thurmansbang
- Location within Germany Location within Bavaria
- Coordinates: 48°46′N 13°19′E
- Country: Germany
- State: Bavaria
- Admin. region: Lower Bavaria
- District: Freyung-Grafenau
- Seat: Thurmansbang
- Subdivisions: 2 municipalities

Area
  - Total: 55.18 km^{2} (21.31 sq mi)

Population (2025-12-31)
  - Total: 3,655
  - Density: 66.24/km^{2} (171.6/sq mi)
- Time zone: UTC+01:00 (CET)
  - Summer (DST): UTC+02:00 (CEST)

Thurmansbang is a Verwaltungsgemeinschaft (municipal association) in the district Freyung-Grafenau in Bavaria, Germany. Its seat is in Thurmansbang.

It consists of the following municipalities:

1. Thurmansbang
2. Zenting
