= Geißlstein =

Mountain in Germany

- Location within Bavaria

Highest point
- Elevation: 906 m (2,972 ft)
- Coordinates: 48°48′51″N 13°15′55″E

Geography
- Location: Bavaria
- Parent range: Bavarian Forest

Geology
- Rock type: gneiss

The Geißlstein, at 906 metres, is one of the smaller mountains in the Bavarian Forest. It lies east of the Brotjacklriegel and next to the Aschenstein. Its summit has no views. It may only be reached through trackless terrain.
