= Bosnian pot =

Bosnian stew

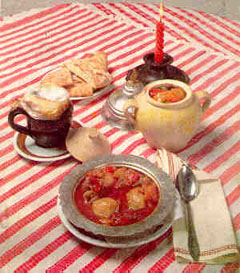
- Type: Stew
- Place of origin: Bosnia and Herzegovina
- Region or state: Balkans
- Main ingredients: Meat (beef, lamb), vegetables (cabbage, potatoes, tomatoes, carrots), parsley, garlic, peppercorns

Bosnian pot (Bosanski lonac) is a Bosnian stew, a culinary speciality, appreciated for its rich taste and flexibility. Recipes for Bosanski lonac vary greatly according to personal and regional preference, but the main ingredients generally include chunked meat and vegetables. Mixed meats may be used in the dish. It has been described as a national dish of Bosnia and Herzegovina.

Bosanski lonac has been on the tables of both the rich and the poor for hundreds of years. The wealthy prepared the dish with more meat and other expensive ingredients, while the poor used what was available. Typical ingredients are beef, lamb, cabbage, potatoes, tomatoes, carrots, parsley, garlic, and peppercorns (whole, not ground). Many different vegetables or meats may be used. Bosanski lonac is prepared by layering meat and vegetables (alternating layers of meat and vegetables until the pot is full) into a deep pot, then adding 1-2 dl water. The ingredients are usually cut into large pieces rather than finely chopped or minced.

Originally, Bosanski lonac was made in ceramic pots and cooked in a fireplace or pit in the ground. Today, with the declining availability of fireplaces for cooking, many cooks use a regular pot and a kitchen stove.

== See also ==
- Irish stew
- List of stews
- Pichelsteiner
