= Pichelsteiner =

German meat and vegetable stew

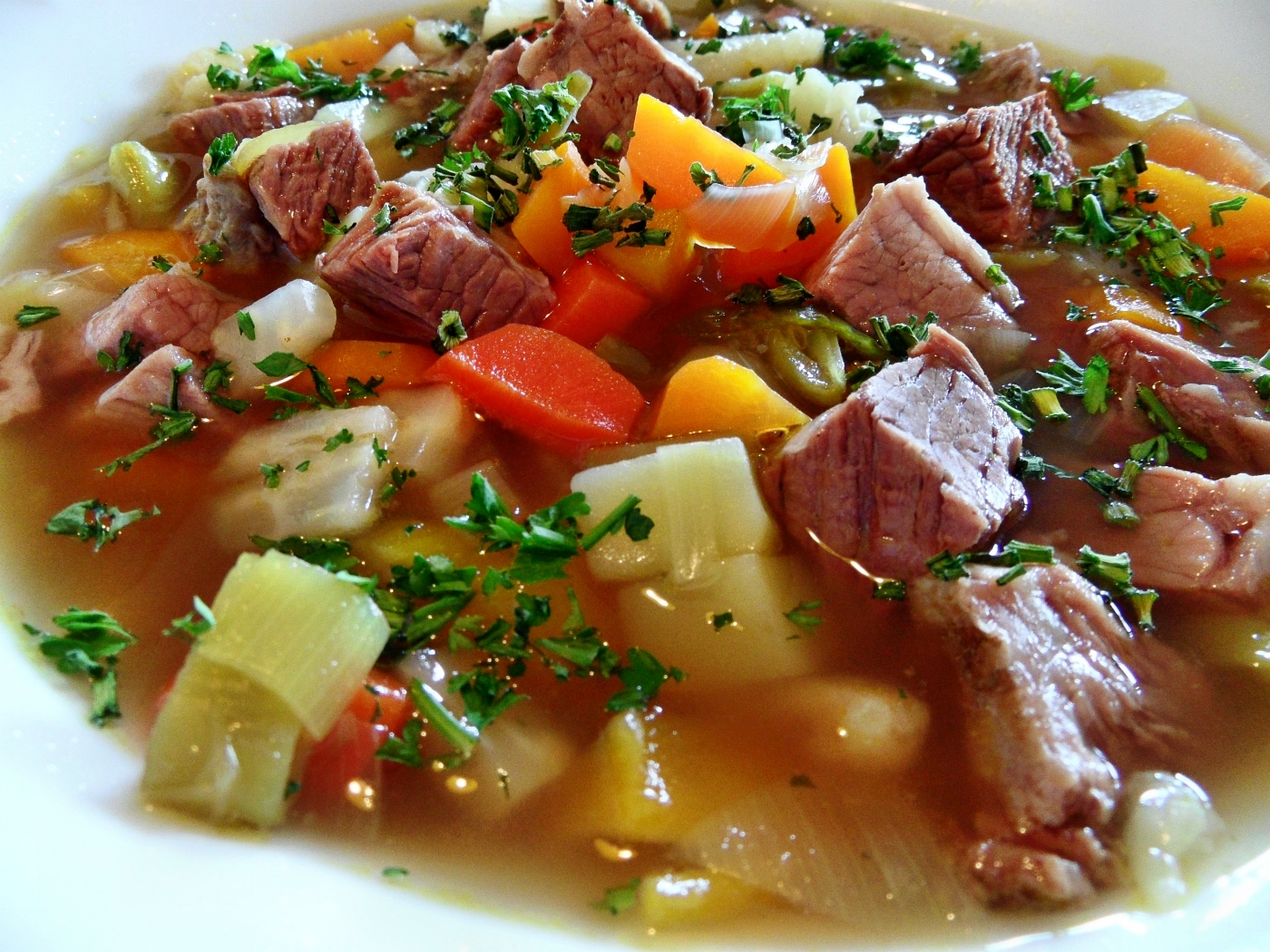
- Type: Stew
- Place of origin: Germany
- Main ingredients: Meat (beef, pork and mutton), vegetables (potatoes, carrots, parsley, cabbage, leeks), meat broth

Pichelsteiner is a German stew that contains several kinds of meat and vegetables.

== Preparation ==
In the first step, beef, pork and mutton are seared. Then the vegetables are added, which are usually potatoes, diced carrots and parsley roots, cut cabbage and leek. Subsequently meat broth is poured over the mixture and everything is cooked together (some recipes also add diced onions and garlic).

In Swabia, it is common to serve the marrow of the bones with which the broth was made together with the finished stew as a garnish. As the dish is very easy to prepare, Pichelsteiner is often prepared in large-scale catering kitchens. Its consistency is normally quite thick.

== Etymology ==
The creation of this dish has been traced to Auguste Winkler (née Kiesling). Originally from Kirchberg im Wald, she worked as an innkeeper in Grattersdorf, where she is also buried. The name is likely to have derived from the nearby Büchelstein mountain, where the annual Büchelsteiner Fest has been celebrated since 1839. As early as the 40th anniversary in 1879, the open-air cooking festival was considered a tradition, and because the letter ü is pronounced like i in the local dialect, the dish's name developed.

In Regen, a town in the Bavarian Forest, the citizens have met annually since 1874 on Kirchweih Monday to eat Pichelsteiner together, a tradition that is still alive today. They also claim the name's etymology. In their opinion, it derives from the pot in which the stew is cooked, which was called a pichel in the past, but this version is highly questioned by Bavarian researcher Max Peinkofer.

The dish was first mentioned in a cookbook in 1894.

== See also ==
- Bavarian cuisine
- Bosnian pot
- List of stews
- List of meat and potato dishes
