= Thurmansbang =

- Municipality
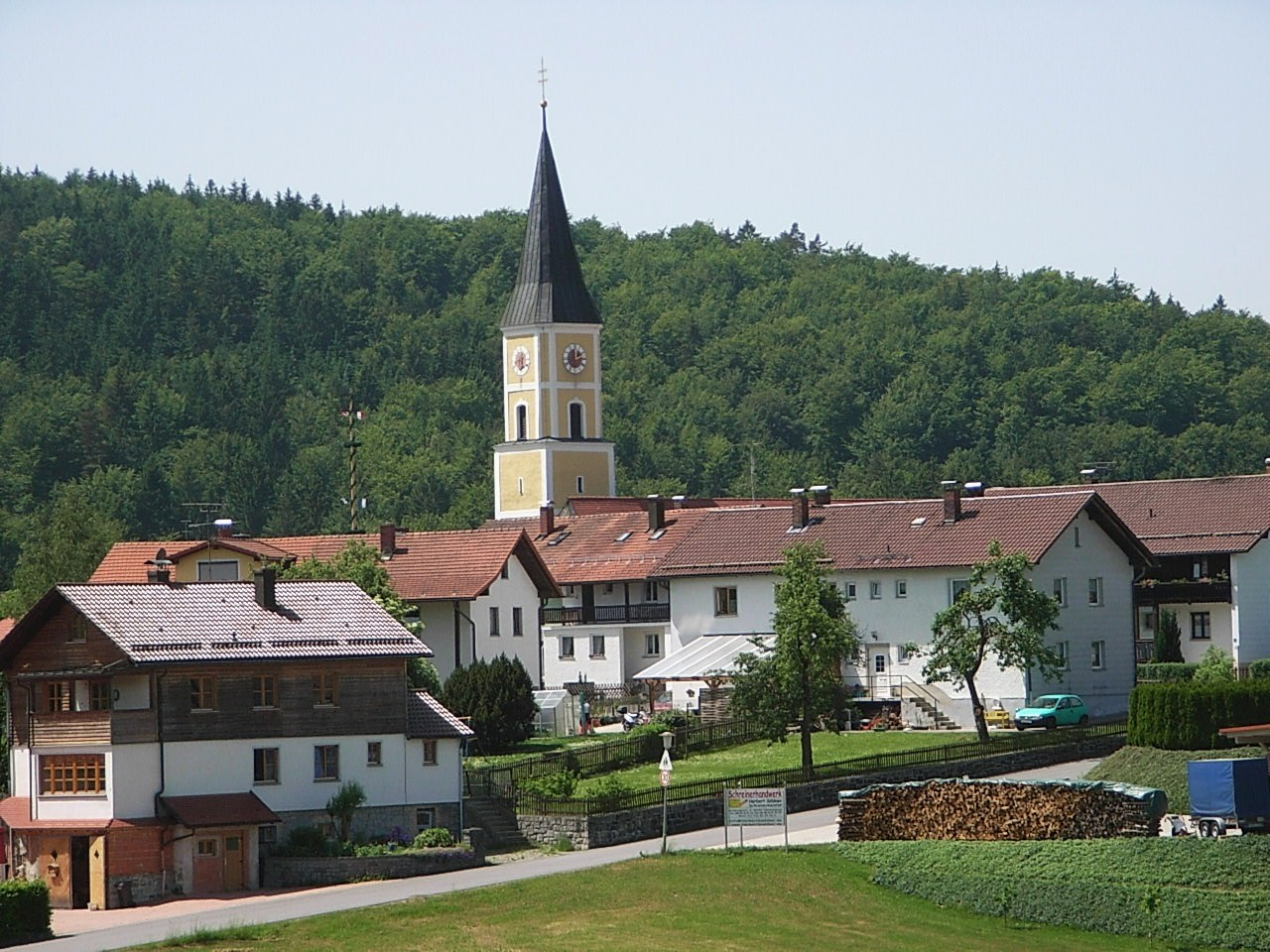
- Thurmansbang

- Coat of arms

- Location of Thurmansbang within Freyung-Grafenau district
- Interactive map of Thurmansbang
- Location within Germany Location within Bavaria
- Coordinates: 48°46′N 13°19′E
- Country: Germany
- State: Bavaria
- Admin. region: Niederbayern
- District: Freyung-Grafenau
- Municipal assoc.: Thurmansbang

Government
  - Mayor (2024–30): Stefan Wagner (CSU)

Area
  - Total: 32.95 km^{2} (12.72 sq mi)
- Elevation: 494 m (1,621 ft)

Population (2025-12-31)
  - Total: 2,507
  - Density: 76.08/km^{2} (197.1/sq mi)
- Time zone: UTC+01:00 (CET)
  - Summer (DST): UTC+02:00 (CEST)
- Postal codes: 94169
- Dialling codes: 08504
- Vehicle registration: FRG
- Website: Offizielle Homepage

Thurmansbang is a municipality in the district of Freyung-Grafenau in Bavaria in Germany.
