= Brotjacklriegel =

Mountain in Germany

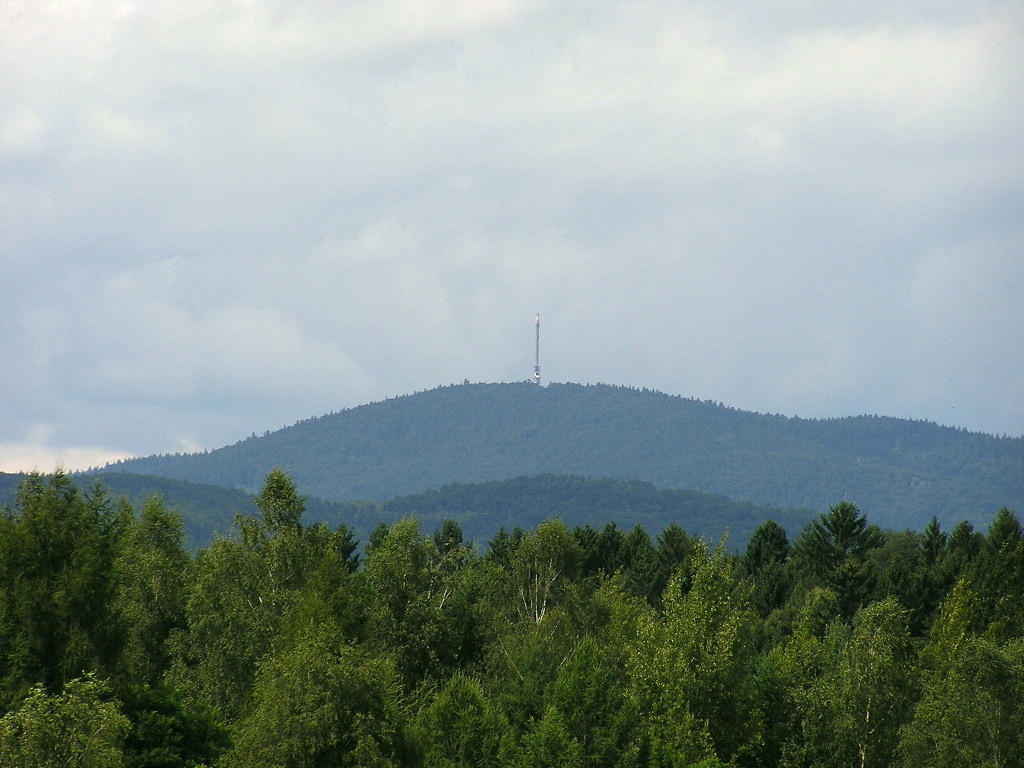
- View from the Rohrbach Reservoir

Highest point
- Elevation: 1,011 m above sea level (NHN) (3,317 ft)
- Prominence: 216 m ↓
- Isolation: 17 km
- Listing: Brotjacklriegel Transmitter, viewing tower
- Coordinates: 48°49′1.23″N 13°13′3.12″E

Geography
- Location within Bavaria
- Location: Freyung-Grafenau, Bavaria (Germany)
- Parent range: Bavarian Forest

Geology
- Rock type: Gneiss

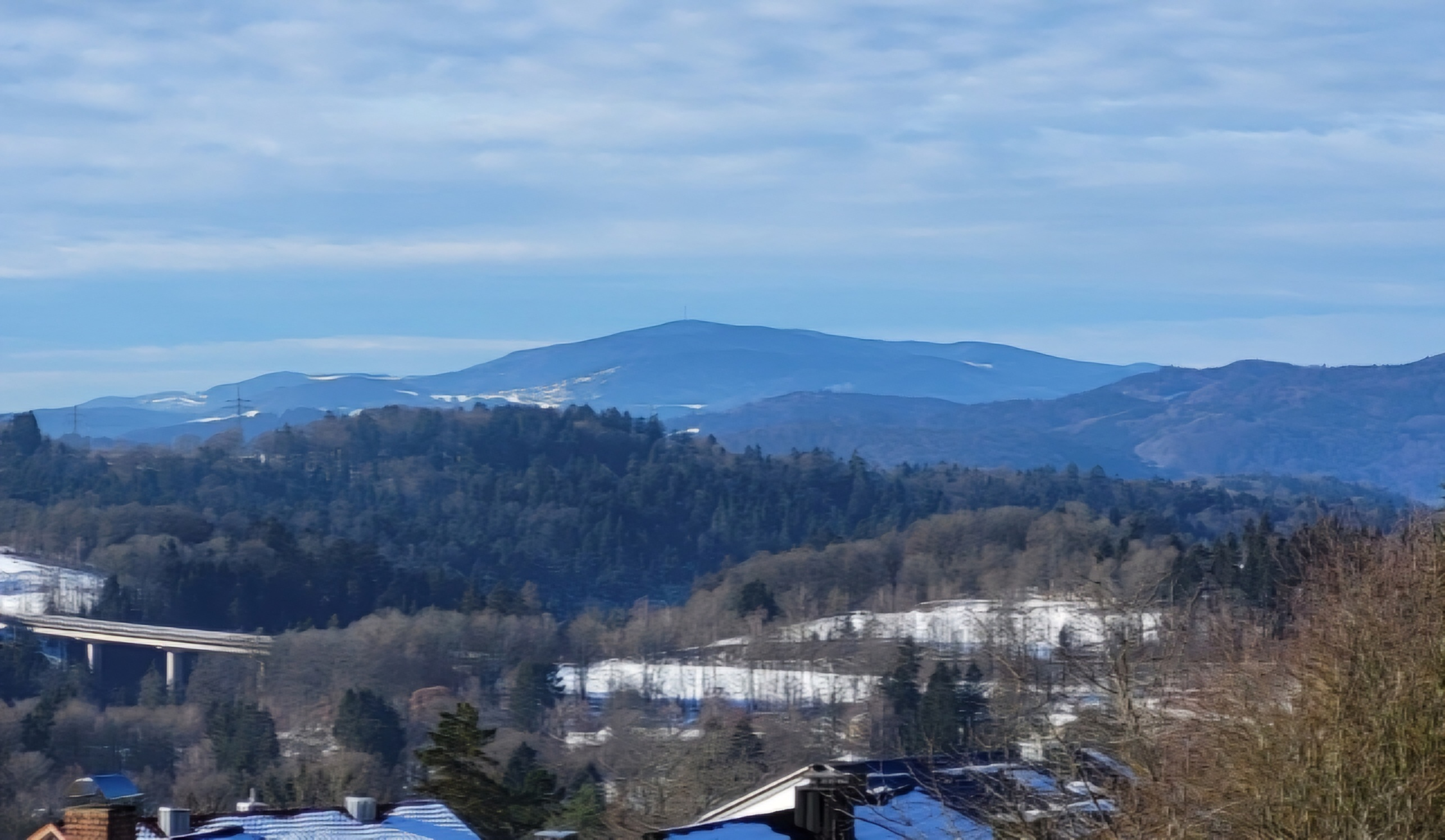
View from Freyung

The Brotjacklriegel is a mountain in the Bavarian Forest. It is 1,011 m above NHN and lies in the county of Freyung-Grafenau in the German federal state of Bavaria. It is a symbol of the Sonnenwald region which comprises the municipalities of Schöfweg, Zenting, Innernzell, Grattersdorf and Market Schöllnach.

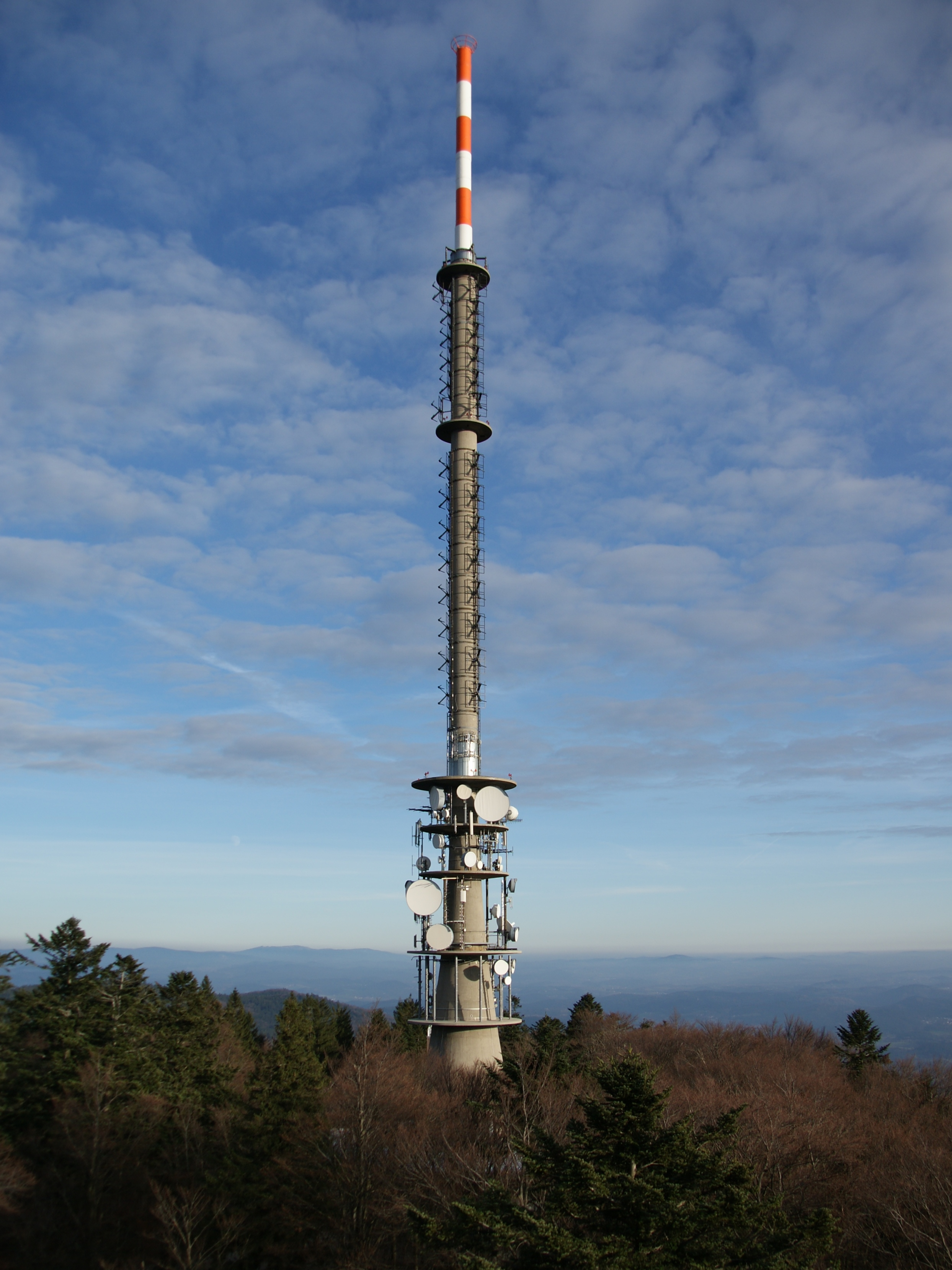
The TV and radio transmitter on the Brotjacklriegel

== Name ==
According to legend, the Brotjacklriegel owes its name to a baker, Brotjackl (EN: "Bread-Jacky"), who is supposed to have hidden on the mountain during the Thirty Years' War. However, the name probably only came into being later during survey work by the French under Napoleon when because of a misunderstanding of the Bavarian "Broada Jaga-Riegl" (Breiter Jägerriegel; EN: Broad Hunter's Sill) the name Brotjacklriegel was written down.

== History ==
As early as 1839 the parish priest and two publicans from Langfurth built the first viewing tower. In 1924 the present 27-metre-high construction was built.

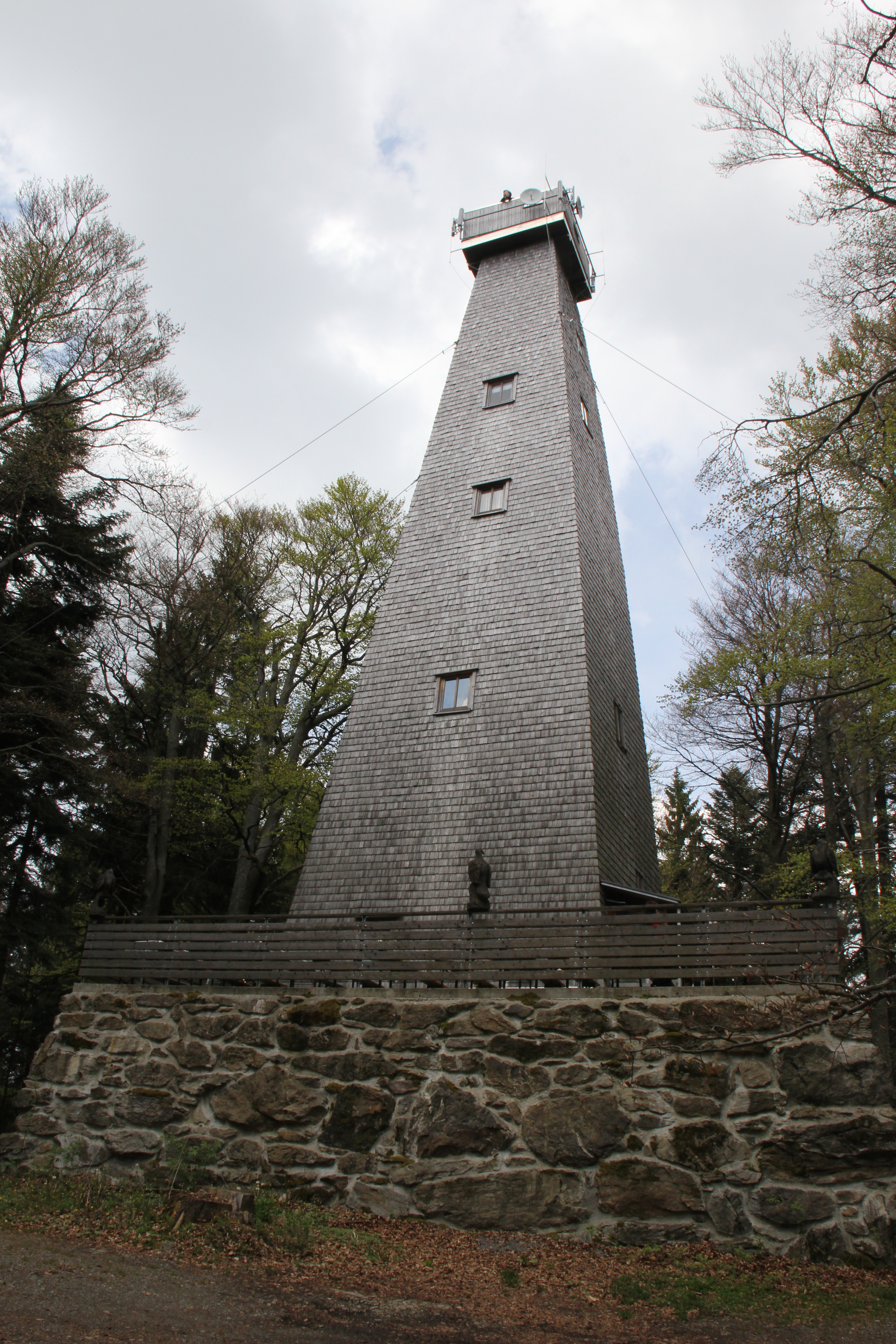
Viewing tower on the Brotjacklriegel

== Description ==
On the eastern mountainside above Daxstein are overgrown clearance cairns.

At the summit of the Brotjacklriegel is a TV and radio transmitter owned by the Bayerischer Rundfunk and a smaller viewing tower belonging to the Bavarian Forest Club.

== Access ==
From the Jackl hikers' car park above the village of Langfurth to the top of the mountain runs a roughly two-kilometre-long trail, the Sonnenwald Nature Trail (Sonnenwald-Erlebnispfad ) with 10 stations at which the forest and its inhabitants are explained.
