= Grattersdorf =

- Municipality
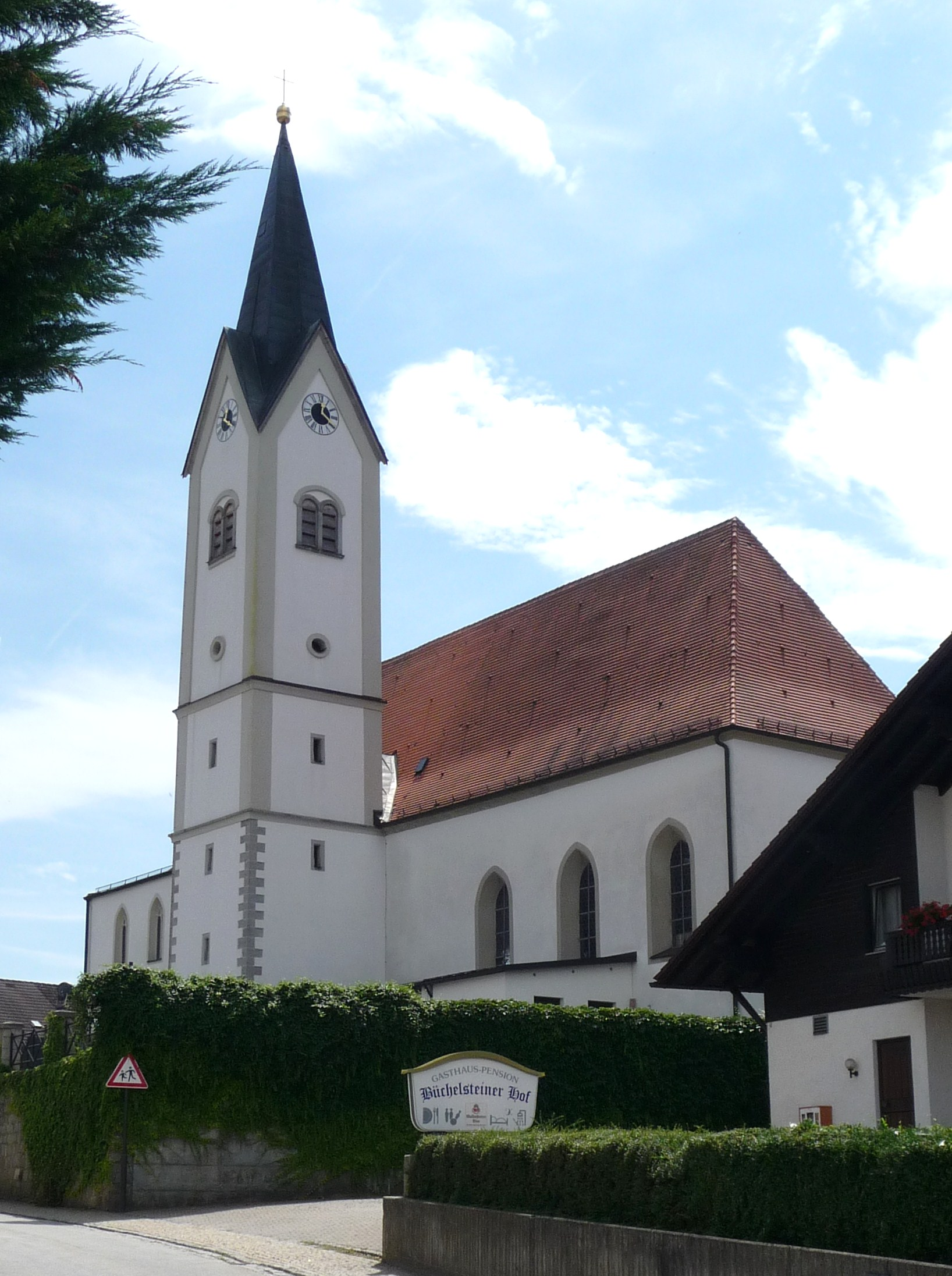
- Church of Saint Giles

- Coat of arms

- Location of Grattersdorf within Deggendorf district
- Interactive map of Grattersdorf
- Location within Germany Location within Bavaria
- Coordinates: 48°48′N 13°9′E
- Country: Germany
- State: Bavaria
- Admin. region: Niederbayern
- District: Deggendorf
- Municipal assoc.: Lalling

Government
  - Mayor (2020–26): Robert Schwankl (CSU)

Area
  - Total: 25.98 km^{2} (10.03 sq mi)
- Elevation: 476 m (1,562 ft)

Population (2025-12-31)
  - Total: 1,343
  - Density: 51.69/km^{2} (133.9/sq mi)
- Time zone: UTC+01:00 (CET)
  - Summer (DST): UTC+02:00 (CEST)
- Postal codes: 94541
- Dialling codes: 09904
- Vehicle registration: DEG
- Website: www.grattersdorf.de

Grattersdorf (German pronunciation: [ˈɡʁatɐsdɔʁf]) is a municipality in the district of Deggendorf, Bavaria, Germany.

== History ==
In the course of the administrative reforms in Bavaria in 1818, the municipalities of Grattersdorf, Nabin, Oberaign and Winsing were formed, which were merged on January 1, 1971 to form the municipality of Grattersdorf.

== Politics ==
=== Mayor ===
The first mayor since May 2020 is Robert Schwankl (CSU). In the local elections on March 15, 2020, he was elected 1st mayor in the first ballot with 66.0 percent. While in 2002, it was Norbert Bayerl (CSU), until his death at the end of October 2017. In 2002 he succeeded Josef Reitberger (CSU). Until the new elections on January 28, 2018, the second mayor, Alfons Gramalla, was in charge and was elected first mayor with 79 percent.
