= Rieder Bach (Rinchnach) =

River in Germany

Location
- Country: Germany
- State: Bavaria

Physical characteristics
- Mouth
  - location: Rinchnach
  - coordinates: 48.9468°N 13.2119°E

Basin features
- Progression: Rinchnach→ Rinchnacher Ohe→ Regen→ Danube→ Black Sea

Rieder Bach is a small river of Bavaria, Germany. It is a left tributary of the Rinchnach near the village Rinchnach.

== See also ==
- List of rivers of Bavaria
