= Rinchnach (disambiguation) =

Rinchnach is a municipality in the Lower Bavarian district of Regen, of Germany.

Rinchnach may also refer to:

- Rinchnach (Rinchnacher Ohe), a river of Bavaria, Germany, right tributary of the Rinchnacher Ohe
- Rinchnach Priory (Kloster Rinchnach), a former Benedictine house at Rinchnach in Bavaria, Germany
