= Eschenberg (Kirchdorf im Wald) =

Mountain in Germany

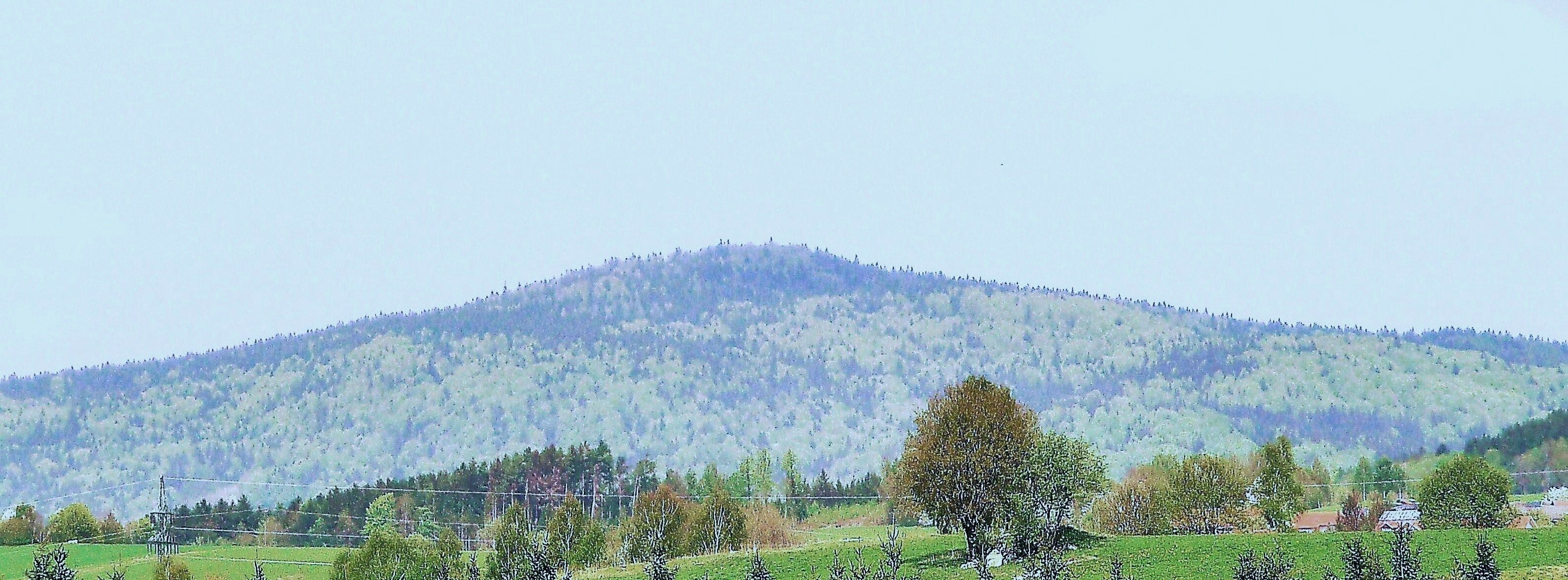
- View of the Eschenberg from the SE

Highest point
- Elevation: 1,042 m (3,419 ft)
- Coordinates: 48°56′05″N 13°16′45″E

Geography
- Location within Bavaria
- Location: near Kirchdorf im Wald; Regen, Bavaria (Germany)
- Parent range: Bavarian Forest

Geology
- Rock type: Gneiss

The Eschenberg near Kirchdorf im Wald in the Bavarian county of Regen is a mountain, 1,042 m above sea level (NN), in the Bavarian Forest.

== Location ==
The Eschenberg lies in the natural region of the High Black Forest (Hinterer Bayerischer Wald, No. 403) in the Bavarian Forest Nature Park. Its summit forms the highest point of a rather rarely visited ridge between the village of Kirchdorf im Wald, Rinchnach and Frauenau (all in the county of Regen) as well as Klingenbrunn (in the neighbouring county of Freyung-Grafenau). On its southern flank is the rock formation of Habichtstein (863 m).

== Description ==
A waymarked footpath runs around Eschenberg. At the summit of the mostly wooded mountain the view is very restricted. For many years there was a military observation post, Fox 2, operated by the Low-Flying Aircraft Reporting and Control Service (Tieffliegermelde- und Leitdienst) of the Bundeswehr with a transmission mast that was visible from a long way off. After it had been given up the municipality of Kirchdorf planned to renaturalise the 11,500 square metre area, but it was sold in 2003. Eventually the village council agreed a plan to build an observatory on the mountain.

Other nearby summits include the Wagensonnriegel, the Gsengetstein and the Hessenstein.
