= Gsengetstein =

Mountain in Germany

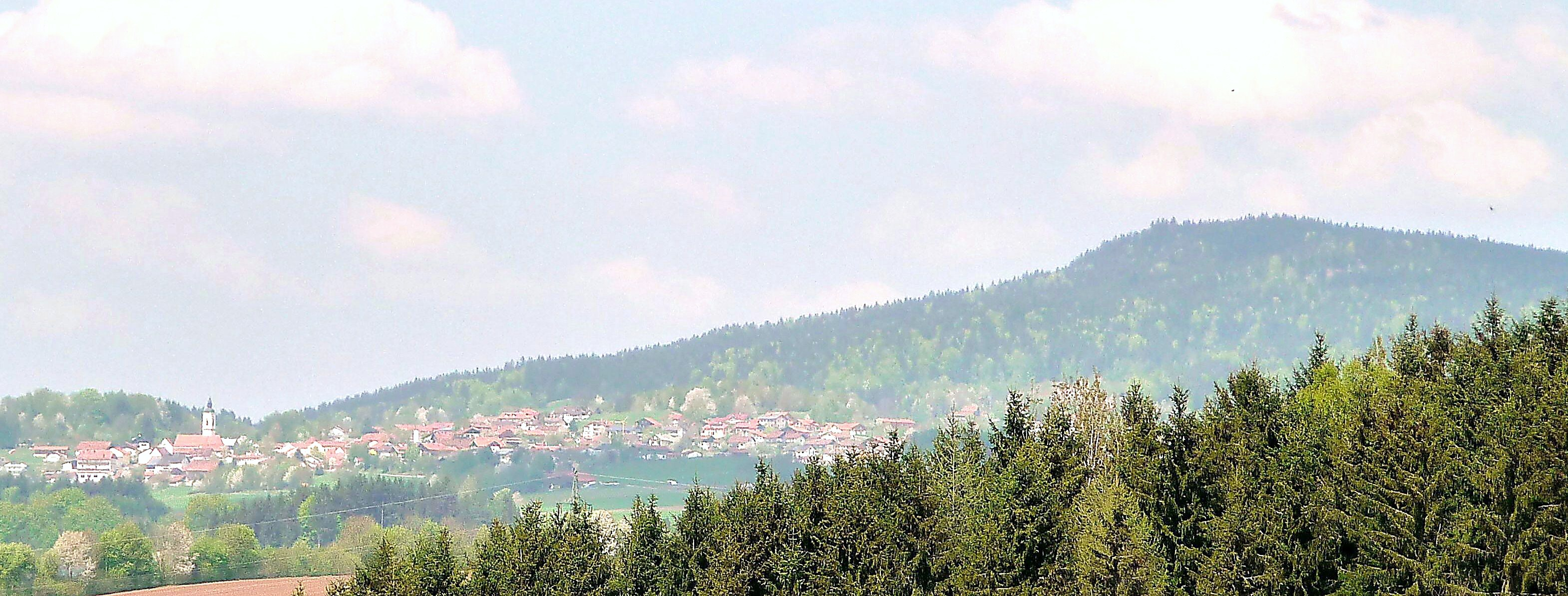
- The Gsengetstein and village of Kirchdorf im Wald

Highest point
- Elevation: 951 m (3,120 ft)
- Coordinates: 48°55′54″N 13°15′29″E

Geography
- Location within Bavaria
- Location: Bavaria
- Parent range: Bavarian Forest

Geology
- Rock type: Gneiss

The Gsengetstein (951 m) is one of the smaller mountains in the Bavarian Forest, rising from in a less-frequented mountain ridge between the villages of Rinchnach, Kirchdorf im Wald and Frauenau.

A large summit cross stands on its craggy summit, which has views towards the southwest. Although the Gsengetstein rises immediately above the busy B 85 federal road, it is rarely visited and is thus an idyllic rest area. The mountain may be ascended from Kirchdorf im Wald, Schlag, Ried or Gehmannsberg near the well known pilgrimage church of Frauenbrünnl (Märia Geburt).

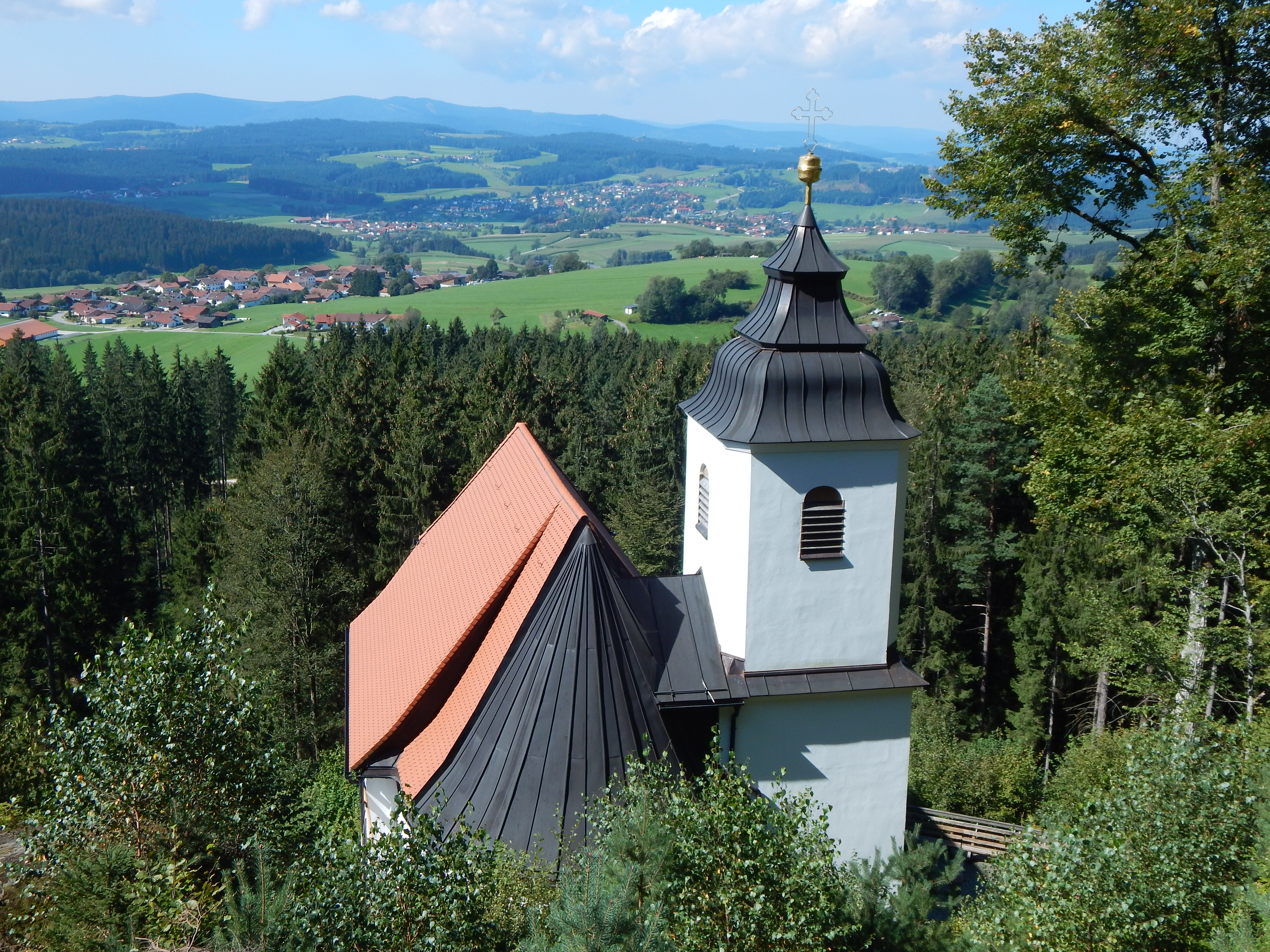
Pilgrimage Church of the Nativity of Mary (Märia Geburt) in Gehmannsberg
