= Rinchnach (Rinchnacher Ohe) =

River in Germany

Location
- Country: Germany
- State: Bavaria

Physical characteristics
- Mouth
  - location: Rinchnacher Ohe
  - coordinates: 48.9482°N 13.1984°E

Basin features
- Progression: Rinchnacher Ohe→ Regen→ Danube→ Black Sea

Rinchnach is a river of Bavaria, Germany. It is a right tributary of the Rinchnacher Ohe in the village Rinchnach.

== See also ==
- List of rivers of Bavaria
