= Rinchnach Priory =

Monastery in Bavaria, Germany

Coordinates: 48°56′58″N 13°12′01″E

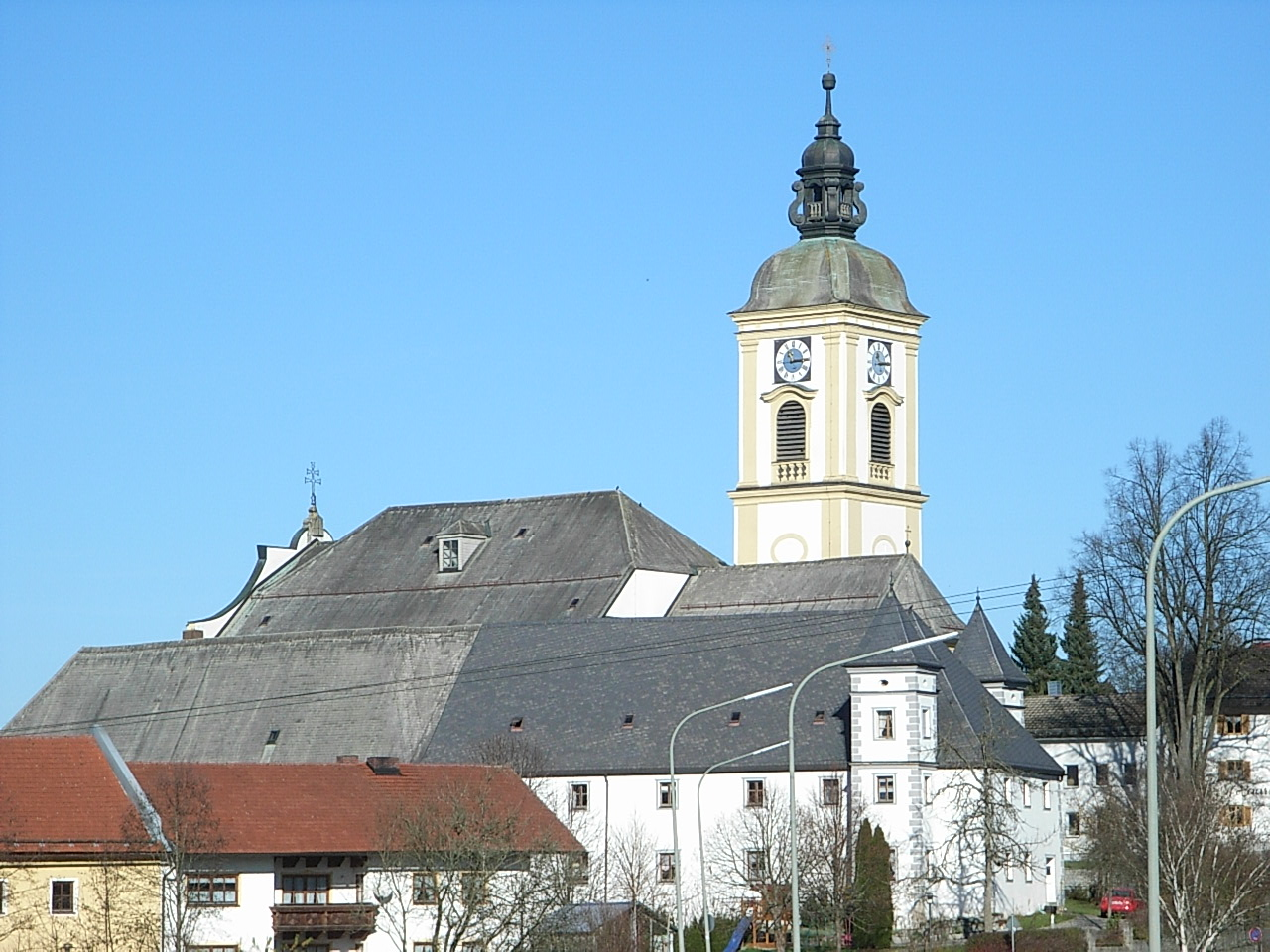
Church of Saint John the Baptist

Rinchnach Priory (German: Kloster Rinchnach) was a Benedictine monastery at Rinchnach in Bavaria, Germany.

== History ==
The monastery, dedicated to Saint John the Baptist, was founded in 1011 by Saint Gunther, a Benedictine monk of Niederaltaich Abbey, as the first settlement in the central Bavarian Forest. In 1029 Emperor Conrad II endowed the monastery with land. It was made a priory of Niederaltaich in 1040, when Saint Gunther moved on to Gutwasser (the present Dobra Voda) in Bohemia.

In 1488 (?) the Hussites burnt the monastery down. In 1703 it was pillaged by Hungarian regiments, but restored in 1708 by Niederaltaich Abbey.

The monastery was dissolved in 1803 as a result of the secularisation of Bavaria, and its estates were auctioned off.
