= Kirchdorf im Wald =

- Municipality
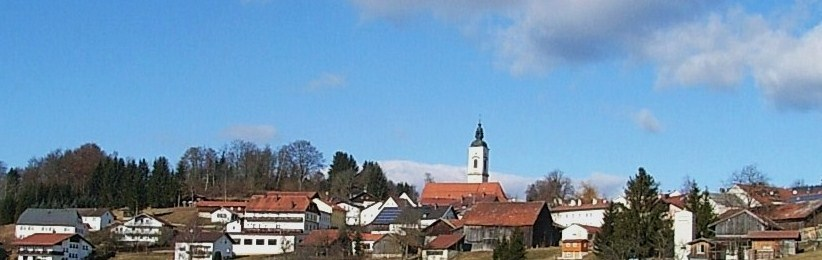
- Kirchdorf im Wald

- Coat of arms

- Location of Kirchdorf im Wald within Regen district
- Interactive map of Kirchdorf im Wald
- Location within Germany Location within Bavaria
- Coordinates: 48°55′N 13°16′E
- Country: Germany
- State: Bavaria
- Admin. region: Niederbayern
- District: Regen
- Subdivisions: 9 districts

Government
  - Mayor (2020–26): Alois Wildfeuer jun. (FW)

Area
  - Total: 30.55 km^{2} (11.80 sq mi)
- Elevation: 684 m (2,244 ft)

Population (2025-12-31)
  - Total: 2,035
  - Density: 66.61/km^{2} (172.5/sq mi)
- Time zone: UTC+01:00 (CET)
  - Summer (DST): UTC+02:00 (CEST)
- Postal codes: 94261
- Dialling codes: 09928
- Vehicle registration: REG
- Website: www.kirchdorf-im-wald.de

Kirchdorf im Wald (German pronunciation: [ˈkɪʁçdɔʁf ʔɪm ˈvalt], lit. 'Kirchdorf in the Forest') is a municipality in the district of Regen in Bavaria in Germany.
