= Rinchnacher Ohe =

River in Germany

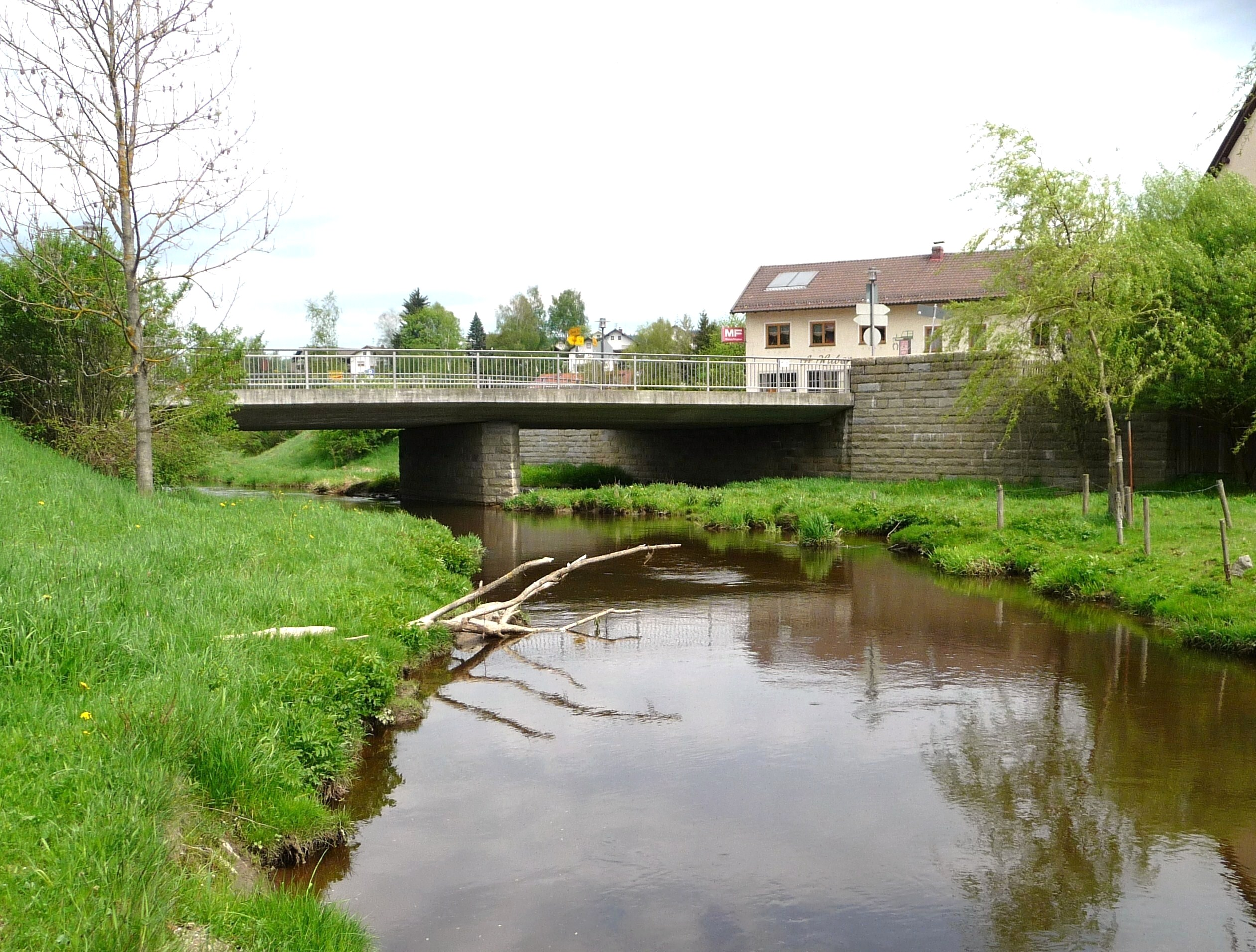
- The Rinchnacher Ohe upstream of the bridge in Rinchnach

Location
- Country: Germany
- State: Bavaria

Physical characteristics
- Mouth
  - location: Schwarzer Regen
  - coordinates: 48.9778°N 13.1560°E
- Length: 24.8 km (15.4 mi)

Basin features
- Progression: Regen→ Danube→ Black Sea

Rinchnacher Ohe is a river of Bavaria, Germany. It is a right tributary of the Schwarzer Regen, the upper course of the Regen, near the town Regen.

== See also ==
- List of rivers of Bavaria
