= Rinchnach =

- Municipality
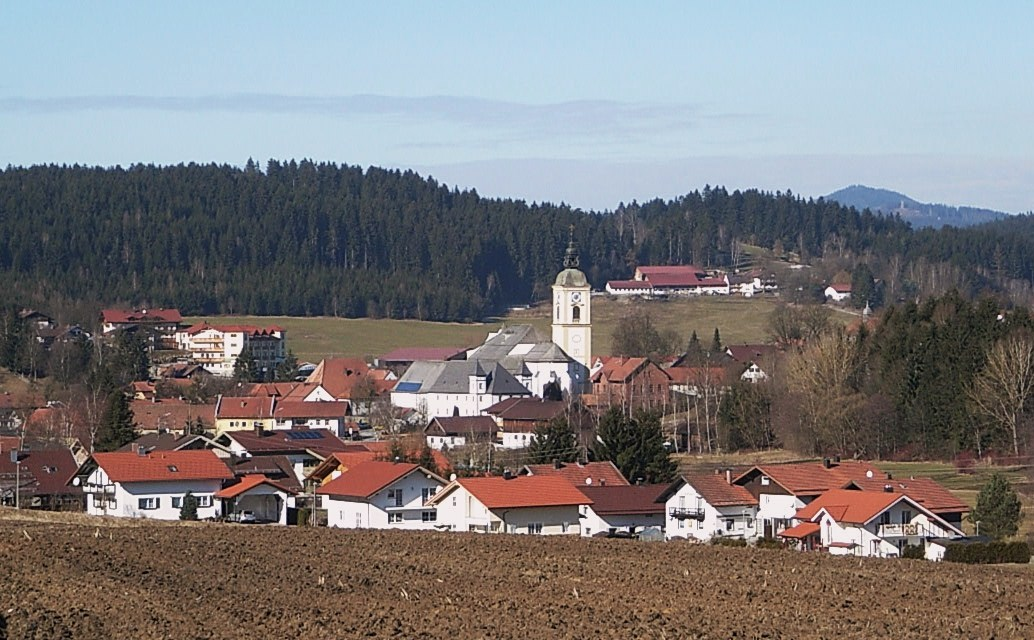
- Rinchnach

- Coat of arms

- Location of Rinchnach within Regen district
- Interactive map of Rinchnach
- Location within Germany Location within Bavaria
- Coordinates: 48°57′N 13°12′E
- Country: Germany
- State: Bavaria
- Admin. region: Niederbayern
- District: Regen

Government
  - Mayor (2021–27): Simone Hilz (SPD)

Area
  - Total: 40.21 km^{2} (15.53 sq mi)
- Elevation: 564 m (1,850 ft)

Population (2025-12-31)
  - Total: 3,138
  - Density: 78.04/km^{2} (202.1/sq mi)
- Time zone: UTC+01:00 (CET)
  - Summer (DST): UTC+02:00 (CEST)
- Postal codes: 94269
- Dialling codes: 09921
- Vehicle registration: REG
- Website: www.rinchnach.de

Rinchnach (German pronunciation: [ˈʁɪnçnax]) is a municipality in the Lower Bavarian district of Regen, of Germany. As of 2000, the population was 3,261.

== Geography ==
Rinchnach is in the midst of the Bavarian Forest, just 7 kilometers southeast of the town Rain, and 9 kilometers south of Zwiesel. The village spreads over a wide, sunny valley at the foot of the Gsengetstein Mountain.

The river Rinchnacher Ohe flows through Rinchnach.

== History ==
Saint Gunther, a Benedictine monk from the Niederaltaich Abbey, created the first settlement in the central Bavarian Forest when he founded the Rinchnach monastery in 1011. The community's history is closely connected with the monastery.

The municipality was destroyed and looted in the Rinchnach Thirty Years' War in 1641. This happened again in 1703 by the Swedes in the War of Spanish Succession, and yet again by the Austrians in 1742-1744 during the War of Austrian Succession.
