= Altenthann =

- Municipality
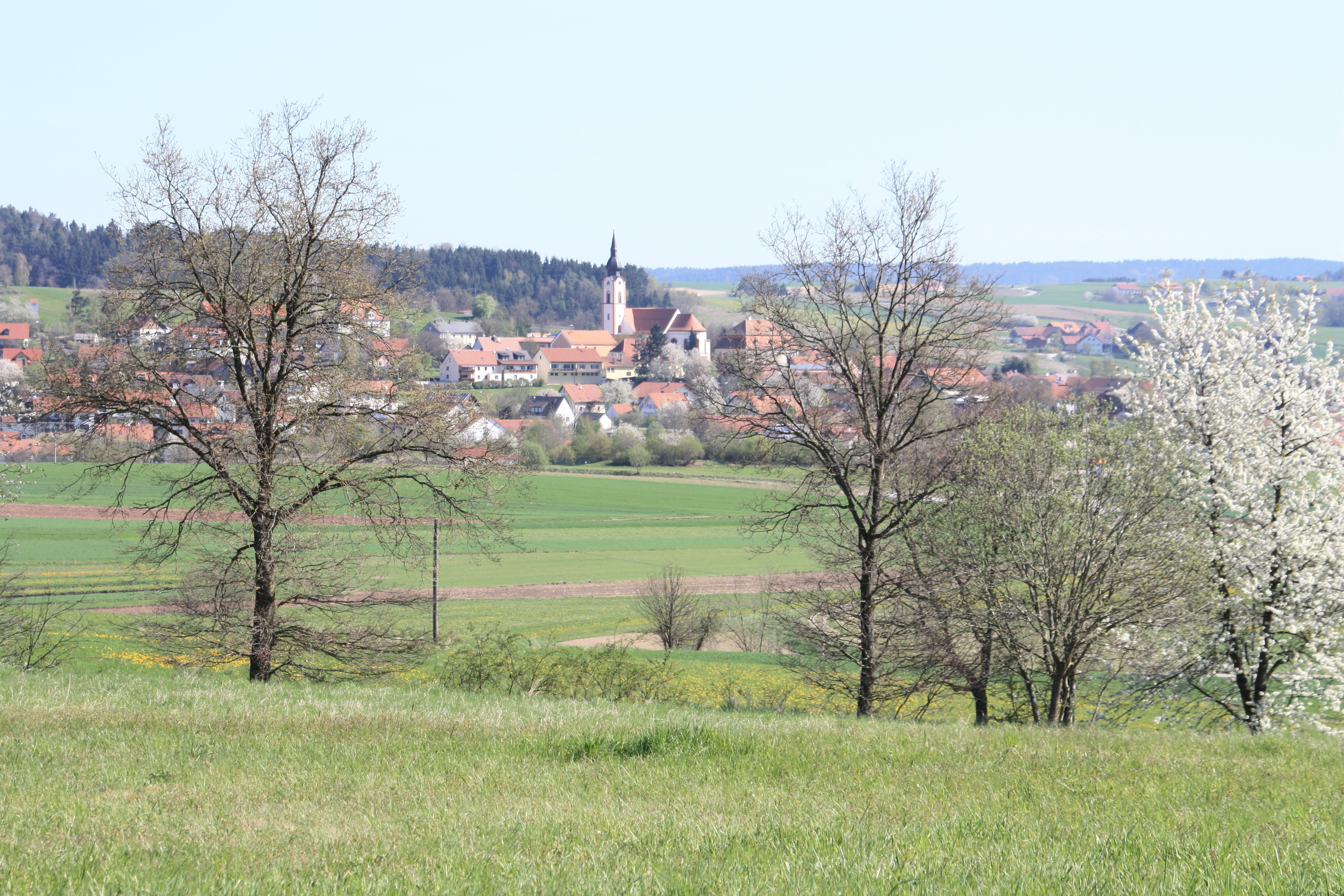
- Altenthann

- Coat of arms

- Location of Altenthann within Regensburg district
- Interactive map of Altenthann
- Location within Germany Location within Bavaria
- Coordinates: 49°5′34″N 12°18′13″E
- Country: Germany
- State: Bavaria
- Admin. region: Oberpfalz
- District: Regensburg
- Municipal assoc.: Donaustauf

Government
  - Mayor (2020–26): Harald Herrmann (FW)

Area
  - Total: 21.27 km^{2} (8.21 sq mi)
- Elevation: 508 m (1,667 ft)

Population (2025-12-31)
  - Total: 1,512
  - Density: 71.09/km^{2} (184.1/sq mi)
- Time zone: UTC+01:00 (CET)
  - Summer (DST): UTC+02:00 (CEST)
- Postal codes: 93177
- Dialling codes: 09403, 09408
- Vehicle registration: R
- Website: www.altenthann.de

Altenthann is a village and municipality in the district of Regensburg in Bavaria in Germany.

== Geography ==
=== Location ===
Altenthann lies in the region of Regensburg, about 18 kilometres northwest of the town of Wörth an der Donau.

=== Subdivisions ===
There are 50 subdivisions within the municipality:

- Altenthann
- Aschenbrennermarter
- Auersölden
- Bachmühl
- Berghof
- Bruckhäusl
- Brunnstuben
- Eichhof
- Forstmühle
- Geishof
- Göppenbach
- Gottesberg
- Gsellhof
- Gsellmühle
- Haid
- Heuweg
- Hörglhof
- Hornismühle
- Jagdhaus Thiergarten
- Kagerhof
- Kropfersberg
- Landsgrub
- Oberlichtenwald
- Ödgarten
- Orhalm
- Pfaffenfang
- Pfittershof
- Pielhof
- Pömerlmühl
- Refthal
- Reinhartswinkl
- Röhren
- Roidhof
- Sägmühl
- Scharr
- Scherbatzen
- Schmatzhäusl
- Seehof
- Spieshof
- Spitz
- Steinbuckl
- Steinklippen
- Stubenthal
- Thiergarten
- Unterlichtenwald
- Weiherhaus
- Weihersölden
- Wiesing
- Willmannsberg
- Ziegelhaus

There are the Gemarkungen of Altenthann, Forstmühler Forst, Göppenbach, Lichtenwald and Pfaffenfang.

=== Climate ===
Precipitation diagram

Altenthann has a humid climate and lies within the cool-temperate climatic zone. The municipality is located in the transition area between the moist Atlantic and the dry continental climate regions. According to the climate classification by Köppen-Geiger, Franconia, including Altenthann, is part of the 'warm temperate rain climate' (Cfb climate). As a result the average air temperatures in the warmest months are below 22 °C (72 °F) and in the coldest months are above −3 °C (27 °F).

The annual precipitation is 742 millimetres, which is in the middle third of the weather station records by the German Met Office; 50% of the weather stations having lower values. The driest month is October; the wettest is June, when there is 1.9 times the rain of the driest month. The annual precipitation variations lie in the upper third. In over 77% of places the variation is less.

== History ==
=== Before the municipality was created ===
Altenthann belonged to the economic district of Straubing (Rentamt Straubing) and the juridical district of Stadtamhof (Landgericht Stadtamhof) in the Electorate of Bavaria. From 1664 until secularisation, Frauenzell Abbey had an open Hofmark here. In the wake of administrative reforms in the Kingdom of Bavaria the present municipality emerged as a result of the 1818 Municipality Edict.

=== Incorporations ===
In 1945 or 1946 the hitherto independent municipality of Pfaffenfang (Landkreis Roding) and parts of the municipality of Göppenbach were incorporated into Altenthann. On 1 January 1978 Lichtenwald was added.

=== Population growth ===
- 1961: 1,235
- 1970: 1,283
- 1987: 1,315
- 1991: 1,441
- 1995: 1,471
- 2000: 1,538
- 2005: 1,580
- 2010: 1,549
- 2015: 1,513

=== 20th and 21st centuries ===
In the past decades Altenthann has developed from an agricultural village into a residential area as a result of the designation of building land and investment in its infrastructure. Important aims of the municipality are currently investment in regenerative, environmentally friendly energy, energy-saving technology, further development of the infrastructure and broadband availability.

== Religion ==
As in the entire Upper Palatinate the majority of the population in Altenthann are Roman-Catholics. Within the municipal area there is the Roman Catholic parish of Altenthann - Brennberg - Frauenzell. It is part of the Diocese of Regensburg.

== Politics ==
=== Council ===
The council consists of twelve members. Since the election in 2014 there are 6 CSU members and 6 members of the Freie Wähler.

=== Mayor ===
The mayor (Bürgermeister) since May 2014 is Harald Herrmann (FW).

=== Coat of arms ===
Blazon: Or, a fir tree on three hills vert, on a chief sable pincers argent (Unter schwarzem Schildhaupt, darin eine silberne Zange, in Gold auf grünem Dreiberg eine grüne Tanne.)

This coat of arms has been used since 1985.

== Culture and sights ==
- Aschenbrennermarter Hunting Lodge dating to 1900 in the Forstmühlen Forest
- Parish Church of St. Nicholas: in 1832 the 1712 church of St. Nicholas almost entirely burned to the ground. It was demolished in 1904 and replaced by a new church designed by Heinrich Hauberrisser. Only the side altars and the chancel still date to 1830. The high altar by Josef Wittmann dates to 1910.
- Fürstlicher Thiergarten

=== Museum ===
- Local history museum of the county of Regensburg in the multi-purpose hall in Altenthann: collection of handicraft products and farming implements. They give an insight into the development of the Bavarian foothills and old customs.

=== Leisure and nature ===
There are numerous cycleways and footpaths around the village that lead into the extensive woods. There is a lido about 14 kilometres away in Falkenstein which is open in summer. The nearest indoor swimming pool is in the town of Wörth an der Donau. In winter, there are facilities for skiers, tobogganists and ice stock players.

=== Sports and clubs ===
There are over 20 clubs in the municipality, including a sports club. Altenthann has several sports facilities including a tennis court and a multi-purpose hall.

The Altenthan Volunteer Fire Brigade (Freiwillige Feuerwehr Altenthann) and the fire crews of the various villages in the municipality provide a fire services and general assistance.

== Economy and infrastructure ==
Altenthann is a residential community and is equipped with basic local amenities and but does not itself have any central local significance. It is located in the catchment area of the city of Regensburg.

=== Economy ===
In the municipality there are several service, handicraft and commercial enterprises, the main building trades are particularly strongly represented and agriculture is also important.

"Altenthann Nord I" is a designated building area.

=== Arbeitsgemeinschaft Vorderer Bayerischer Wald ===
On 8 January 2007, the working group Vorderer Bayerischer Wald ("AG Vorwald" for short), was founded. Its aim is to promote and strengthen the region in terms of tourism, economy and culture. The members of this working group are the municipalities of Altenthann, Bernhardswald, Brennberg, Falkenstein, Michelsneukirchen, Rettenbach, Wald, Wiesenfelden, Zell and the town of Wörth an der Donau. All local tourist associations of these municipalities are members too.

=== Tourism ===
The municipality has numerous holiday apartments and private quarters. Tourism is focused on "farm holidays".

There is an Altenthann - Bernhardswald - Kürn tourist office.

=== Transport ===
Bundesstraße 16 (five kilometres away)

=== Public institutions ===
- Kindergarten
- Nursery
- Sewage plant
- Recycling centre
- Youth club

=== Education ===
- Primary school

=== Media ===
The main local newspapers and magazines delivered to the municipality include the Donau-Post, a local edition of the Straubinger Tagblatt and the Bayerwaldecho, a local edition of the Mittelbayerische Zeitung and the Regensburger Wochenblatt, a publication of the Wochenblatt Verlagsgruppe.

== Literature ==
- Klaus Völger: Petrographie und Tektonik anatektischer Gesteine im Gebiet Wenzenbach-Altenthann. Dissertation, TU Berlin, 1958.
