= Hatune Dogan =

Hatune Dogan (born April 4, 1970 in Midyat in southeastern Turkey) is a religious nun of the Syriac Orthodox Church of Antioch, President of the organization Helfende Hände für die Armen (Helping Hands for the Poor). She currently lives in the Syriac Orthodox monastery of St. Jacques Sarug in Warburg, Germany.

== Life ==
Until the age of 15 Hatune Dogan lived in the eastern part of the Turkey as a member of the small minority of the Syriac Orthodox Church. Her family had to suffer many persecutions because of their faith, but finally they fled to Germany. With 18 years she became a member of the religious order Ephrem the Syrian in Glane. Hatune Dogan became deaconess studying at the Catholic University of Applied Sciences, Mainz. In 1982 she began to work in Syriac Orthodox communities in the area of Paderborn, teaching Religion and German. From 1992 on she worked on a German-Aramaic dictionary, which was published in 1997.

From 1991 to 1999 Sister Hatune Dogan worked also with free groups. In this time rose the idea to found a foundation. Since 1992, when she was in India for the first time, she collected informations and took care of the distribution of donations. To optimize this help, she founded in India in 2003 the Sister Hatune Foundation (which was internationally recognized in 2005) for to help the people to sustain themselves or capacity building, under the German slogan "Help to help yourself" Hilfe zur Selbsthilfe. In 2006, she founded the association "Helping Hands for the Poor" in Paderborn. In 2011 the "Sister-Hatune Foundation - Helping Hands for the Poor" was launched and on 22 November 2011 recognized by the district government of Detmold.

The "Sister-Hatune Foundation", Warburg, Germany, pursues non-profit, charitable and ecclesiastical-charitable purposes. These are:

- Water wells and water for the poor
- Houses for the poor
- Clinical supportment
- Establishment of training centers for girls and boys wherever the training and future development of the renewable generation is failing.
- Establishment and operation of a women's monastic community .
- Formation of volunteers

The foundation is an international organization. It maintains sections in Europe, the Middle East, Asia, Africa and the USA. Organization teams support the work directly on site. The Foundation coordinates the work of more than 5,000 volunteers in 37 countries around the world, working as a helping hand among the poorest of the poor and sick, without pursuing religious objectives. In addition to the construction of wells for fresh water and house building projects for the homeless (about 500 each year), the foundation offers medical aid (mobile clinics, leprosy assistance) with more than 23,000 patients annually, education and vocational training (schools and institutes) for 2600 pupils and more than 1,000 completed vocational trainings, support for orphans (about 300 children), opportunities for self-help and financial support for the poor. A further focus of the work are natural disasters and displaced persons (currently mainly for the displaced christians, yazidis and other minorities from Iraq and Siria).

The great success in India in the work and in the recognition by the Indian government, lies in the use of the available resources. Sister Hatune, for example, is trying to ensure that 100% of the money donated will be spent on projects. The foundation has also managed to raise 75% of the amount spent for house and well constructions by the Indian state, regional institutions and private Indian patrons. This means that a well or house can be built for just $500.

World Council of Churches Sister Hatune Dogan also has links to charity organizations on the African continent. She took part in the World Council of Churches and the Ecumenical Christian Women's Forum. Her charity work in Africa began with the help for orphans, whose parents died by AIDS, in Zimbabwe.

In Germany, the Foundation will provide accommodation for refugees.

The foundation's principal offices are in Paderborn and the state of Kerala in South India. In America, many European, African and Asian countries, sections have been set up. These are subdivided into different teams with special tasks.

Sister Hatune, who is called sometimes the new Mother Teresa, wrote that she has got eighteen death threats in seven languages.

== Honours ==
- 2010: Order of Merit of the Federal Republic of Germany
- 2012: Stephanus-Preis für ihren weltweiten Einsatz für verfolgte Christen.

== Books ==
- together with Cornelia Tomerius (Ed.): Es geht ums Überleben – Mein Einsatz für die Christen im Irak, Verlag Herder, Freiburg i.Br. 2010, ISBN 978-3-451-30228-2.
- Dogan, Hatune: Wörterbuch Syrisch (Aramäisch) -Deutsch, Deutsch-Syrisch (Aramäisch). 2. (verbesserte, revidierte) Auflage. Warburg 1998. ISBN 3-00-002595-2
- Dogan, Hatune/Riedl, Tonia: Ich glaube an die Tat. Im Einsatz für Flüchtlinge aus Syrien und dem Irak, Brunnen Verlag (Gießen) 2015, ISBN 978-3-7655-4258-9.
