= Wiesent (Danube) =

River in Bavaria, Germany

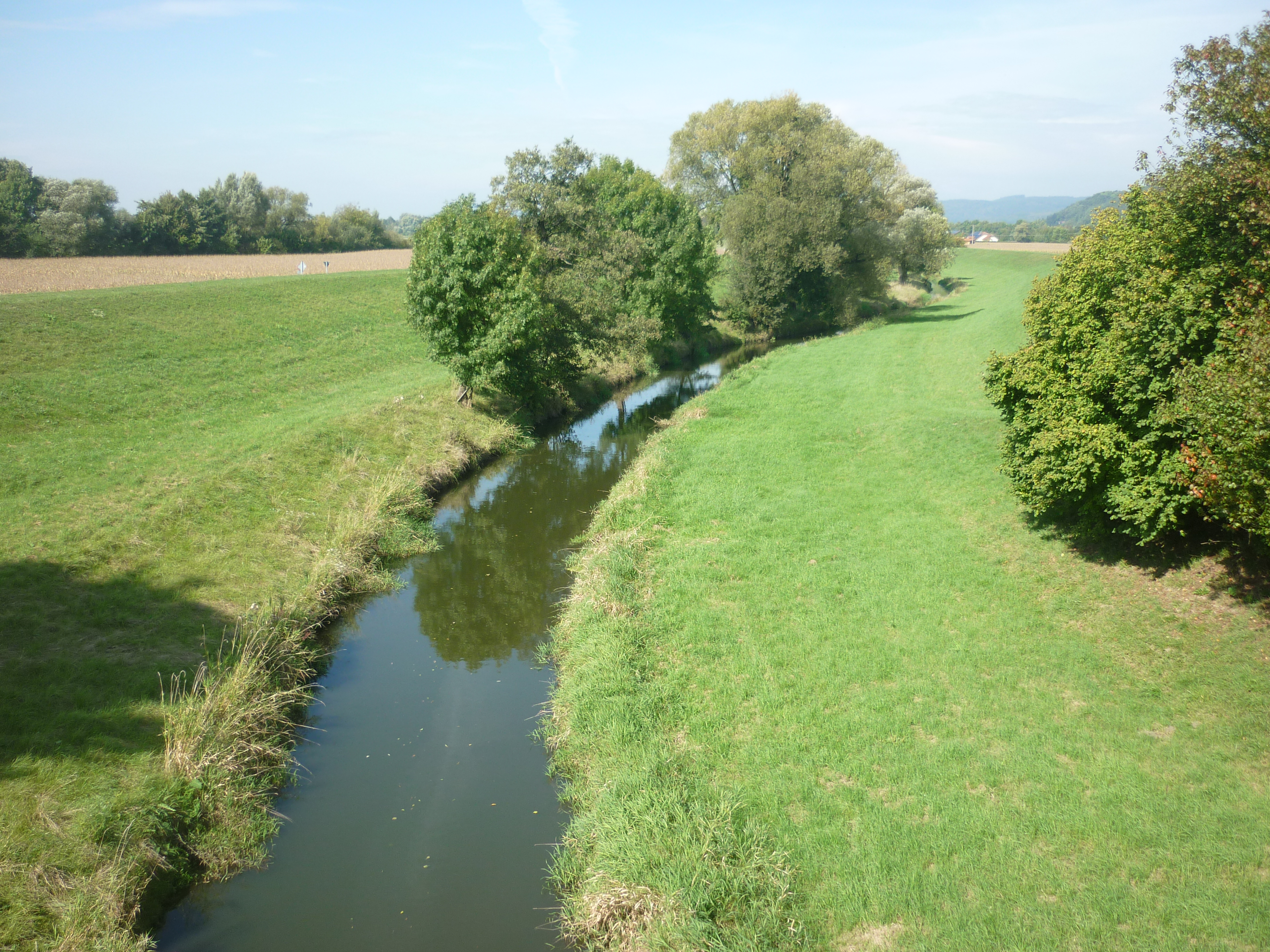
- The Wiesent at Wörth an der Donau

Location
- Country: Germany
- State: Bavaria
- Region: Upper Palatinate
- District: Regensburg

Physical characteristics
- Source: Falkensteiner Vorwald (young-growth forest)
  - location: near Wiesenfelden
  - coordinates: 49°03′06″N 12°34′41″E
  - elevation: 652 m (2,139 ft)
- Mouth: Danube
  - location: Alte Donau oxbow
  - coordinates: 48°58′11″N 12°26′16″E
  - elevation: 320 m (1,050 ft)
- Length: 40.0 km (24.9 mi)
- Basin size: 156 km^{2} (60 sq mi)

Basin features
- Tributaries
  - left: Perlbach, Wörther Bach, Rupertsbühler Bach
  - right: Deßgraben, Augraben
- Progression: Danube→ Black Sea

Wiesent (German pronunciation: [ˈviːzɛnt]) is a river of Bavaria, Germany. It is a tributary of the Danube, that it enters through the oxbow Alte Donau between Wörth an der Donau and Niederachdorf.

== See also ==
- List of rivers of Bavaria
