= Rettenbach =

Rettenbach may refer to the following places:

- in Bavaria, Germany:
  - Rettenbach, Upper Palatinate, in the district of Cham
  - Rettenbach, Swabia, in the district of Günzburg
  - Rettenbach am Auerberg, in the district Ostallgäu
  - Markt Rettenbach, in the district Unterallgäu
- in Austria:
  - Rettenbach glacier, near Sölden in the ôtztal Alps
  - Rettenbach (ski slope), World Cup alpine ski slope near Sölden in the ôtztal Alps
