= Wiesent =

Wiesent may refer to:

- Wiesent, Bavaria, a municipality in Regensburg District, Bavaria, Germany
- Wiesent (Danube), a river in Bavaria that flows into the Danube
- Wiesent (Regnitz), a river in Franconian Switzerland, Bavaria, that flows into the Regnitz

== See also ==
- Wisent, the European bison
