= Edith Kellnhauser =

German nursing scientist, educator, and writer (1933–2019)

Edith Kellnhauser (1933 – May 23, 2019) was a German nursing scientist, educator, and writer. She studied in German, England and the United States, and worked in the U.S., Egypt, and Germany. Her awards include the Order of Merit of the Federal Republic of Germany.

== Early life and education ==
Edith Kellnhauser was born in Wolkering, Regensburg district, 1933. From 1951 to 1953, Kellnhauser completed the then two-year training as a nurse at a hospital affiliated with the Bavarian Red Cross hospital in Munich.

== Career ==
Until 1955, she worked in a surgical ward at the RK Hospital in Munich, and from 1956 to 1957, took over the management of a private ward at the gynaecology clinic.

From 1957 to 1958, she completed the 3rd year of training as a registered nurse at West Middlesex Hospital in London, according to the English care system founded by Florence Nightingale. Here, she passed the state exam and received recognition as a State Registered Nurse by the General Nursing Council for England and Wales.

In 1959, Kellnhauser removed to the U.S. for more than 25 years, except for a three-year break at the University Hospital in Alexandria, Egypt. After several months of inpatient service in surgery and internal medicine at Little Company of Mary Hospital in a Chicago suburb, she completed a three-month post-qualification at the state psychiatric hospital in Chattahoochee, Florida (November 1959 and January 1960), obtaining a nursing license as a State Registered Nurse, which was valid throughout the U.S. Kellnhauser worked as a ward nurse, department nurse, head nurse, or deputy nursing director in the departments of oncology, psychiatry, surgery, and the intensive care unit at Florida State Hospital, Jackson Memorial Hospital, and Cedars Medical Center in Miami. From 1977 to 1980, she studied philosophy at Florida International University, Miami, earning a Bachelor of Arts degree, and from 1983 to 1985, she earned a Master of Science degree in education sciences with a focus on adult education. During this time, she also guest lectured for Elisabeth Kübler-Ross.

After returning to Germany in 1986, Kellnhauser worked at the German Hospital Institute in Düsseldorf until 1992, where she took over the scientific and editorial management of the literature database HECLINET (Health Care Literature Information Network). In 1992, Kellnhauser was appointed professor for nursing management and nursing education at the Catholic University of Applied Sciences, Mainz, and became the founding dean of the nursing department. In 1993, she worked at the Osnabrück University where she was involved in an international comparison for transferability to Dr. phil. doctorate within Germany .

== Later years and death ==
After retiring in 1999, she continued to work in various areas of nursing care. She gave lectures at specialist congresses and arranged internships for nursing students in the United States. She was a member of professional commissions and committees. From 2001, she published the textbook Thiemes Pflege, in association with Liliane Juchli. Her autobiography, Eine außergewöhnliche Pflegekarriere ("An Extraordinary Nursing Career"), was published in 2012.

Kellnhauser died on May 23, 2019.

== Selected works ==
- with Ursula Zawada: Pflegedokumentation in der häuslichen Krankenpflege. Visitas, Düsseldorf 1989, ISBN 3-927509-02-7. (in German)
- Krankenpflegekammern und Professionalisierung der Pflege. Ein internationaler Vergleich mit Prüfung der Übertragbarkeit auf die Bundesrepublik Deutschland. ("Nursing chambers and professionalization of nursing. An international comparison with examination of the transferability to the Federal Republic of Germany") Dissertation. Universität Osnabrück 1993. Bibliomed, Melsungen 1994, ISBN 3-921958-97-0. 2nd edition Zawada, Mönchengladbach 2012, ISBN 978-3-932042-08-9. (in German)
- Fachenglisch für Pflegekräfte. Die Nutzung englischer Fachtermini am Beispiel der Pflege in den USA. ("Technical English for nurses. The use of English terminology using the example of care in the USA") Schlütersche, Hannover 2003, ISBN 3-87706-898-7. (in German)
- Eine außergewöhnliche Pflegekarriere. Autobiography. Hpsmedia, Hungen 2012, ISBN 978-3-9814259-8-7. (in German)
- Der Gründungsprozess der Pflegekammer Rheinland-Pfalz. ("The founding process of the Rhineland-Palatinate Nursing Chamber") Schlütersche, Hannover 2016, ISBN 978-3-89993-380-2. (in German)

== Awards ==
- 2017: Order of Merit of the Federal Republic of Germany
- 2019: German Nursing Award for the Lifetime Achievement of the German Nursing Council
- 2019: Honorary doctorate from the University of Teacher Education Schwäbisch Gmünd
