= Tegernheim =

- Municipality
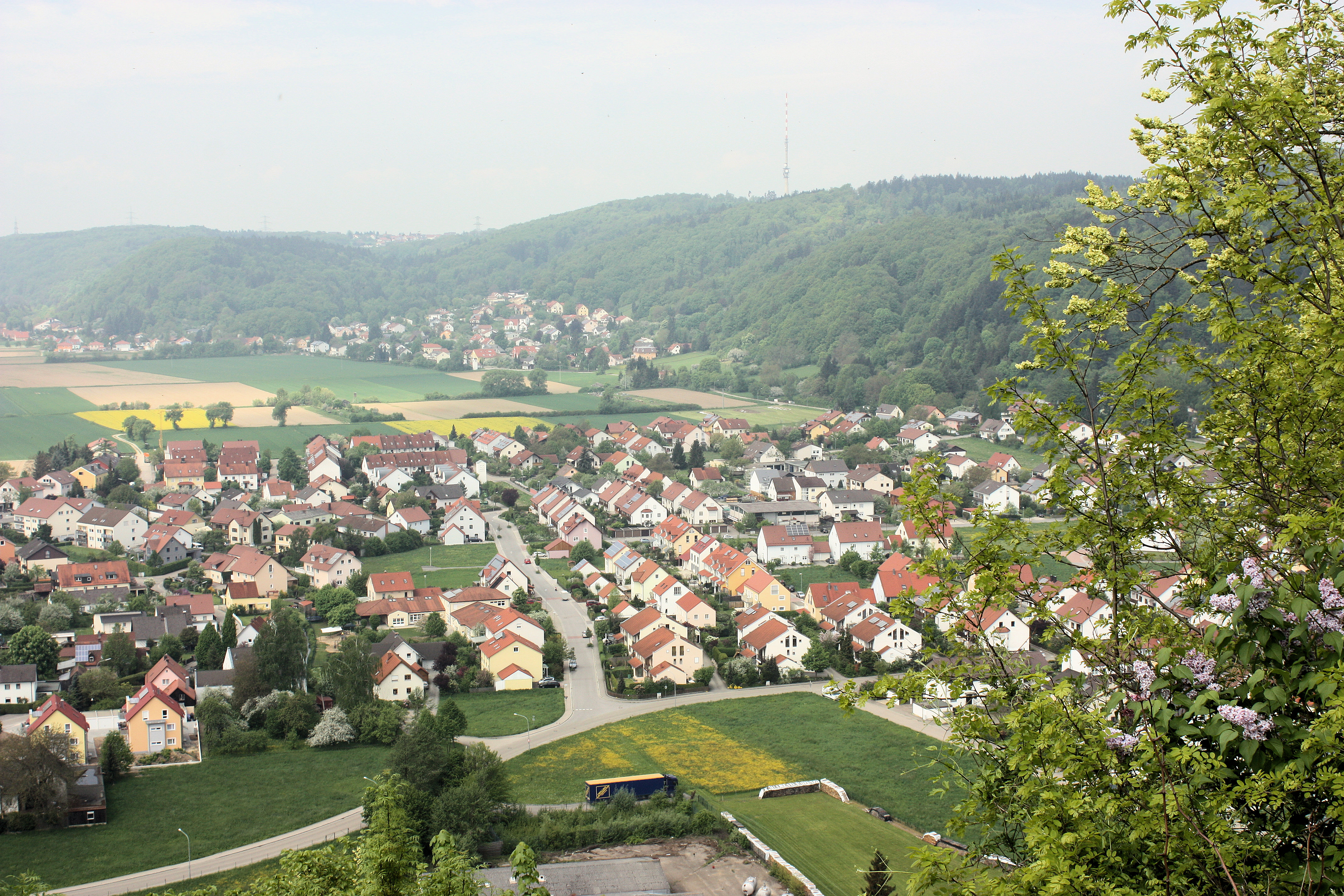
- Tegernheim seen from Donaustauf Castle

- Coat of arms

- Location of Tegernheim within Regensburg district
- Interactive map of Tegernheim
- Location within Germany Location within Bavaria
- Coordinates: 49°01′29″N 12°10′21″E
- Country: Germany
- State: Bavaria
- Admin. region: Oberpfalz
- District: Regensburg

Government
  - Mayor (2020–26): Max Kollmannsberger (FW)

Area
  - Total: 11.43 km^{2} (4.41 sq mi)
- Elevation: 332 m (1,089 ft)

Population (2025-12-31)
  - Total: 5,530
  - Density: 484/km^{2} (1,250/sq mi)
- Time zone: UTC+01:00 (CET)
  - Summer (DST): UTC+02:00 (CEST)
- Postal codes: 93105
- Dialling codes: 09403
- Vehicle registration: R
- Website: www.tegernheim.de

Tegernheim (Northern Bavarian: Dächaham) is a municipality in the district of Regensburg in Bavaria in Germany. The Danube flows through the cadastrial area of the village.
