= Pfatter =

- Municipality
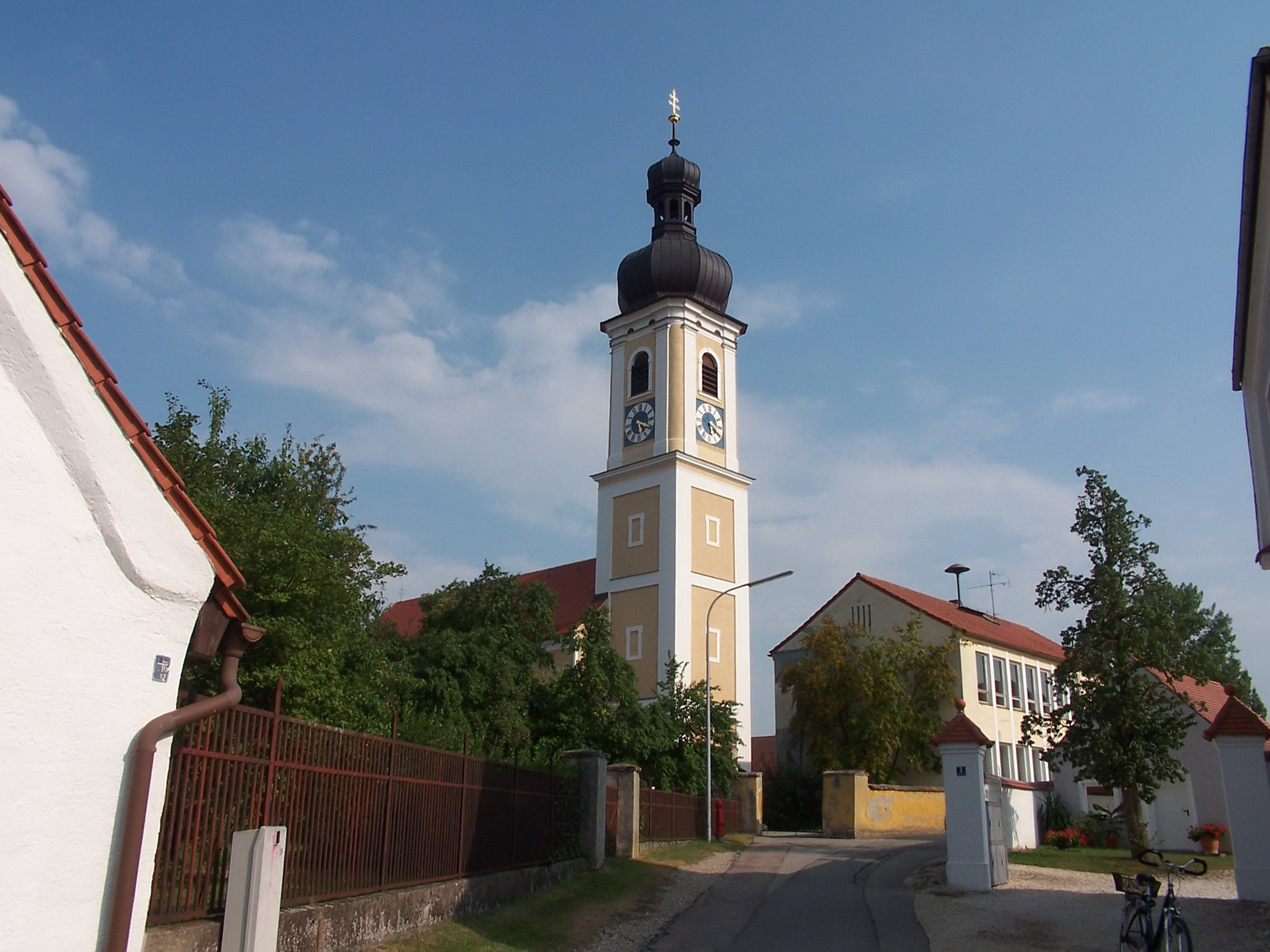
- Church of the Nativity of the Virgin Mary in Geisling

- Coat of arms

- Location of Pfatter within Regensburg district
- Interactive map of Pfatter
- Location within Germany Location within Bavaria
- Coordinates: 48°57′54″N 12°22′52″E
- Country: Germany
- State: Bavaria
- Admin. region: Oberpfalz
- District: Regensburg
- Subdivisions: 5 Ortsteile

Government
  - Mayor (2020–26): Johann Biederer

Area
  - Total: 48.16 km^{2} (18.59 sq mi)
- Elevation: 326 m (1,070 ft)

Population (2025-12-31)
  - Total: 3,139
  - Density: 65.18/km^{2} (168.8/sq mi)
- Time zone: UTC+01:00 (CET)
  - Summer (DST): UTC+02:00 (CEST)
- Postal codes: 93102
- Dialling codes: 09481
- Vehicle registration: R
- Website: www.pfatter.de

Pfatter (German pronunciation: [ˈpfatɐ]; Northern Bavarian: Pfada) is a municipality in the district of Regensburg in Bavaria, Germany. It lies on the river Danube. The Danube village used to be a central place in the Gäuboden and had a central function in its region.

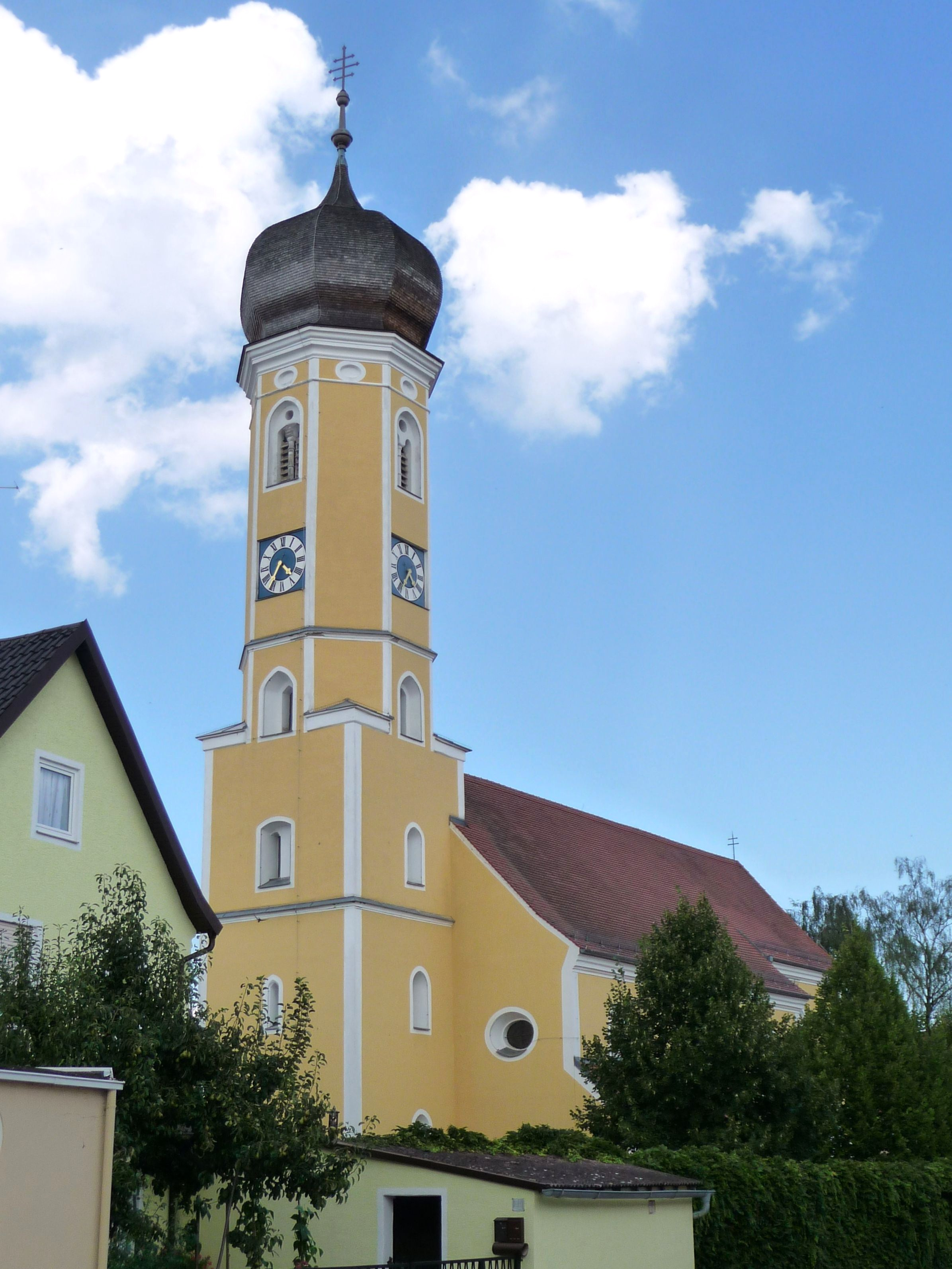
The Parish Church of the Assumption of the Virgin Mary

== Municipality structure ==
- Pfatter (1769 inhabitants)
- Geisling (876 inhabitants)
- Griesau (214 inhabitants)
- Gmünd (156 inhabitants)
- Leiterkofen (60 inhabitants)
