= Alteglofsheim =

- Municipality
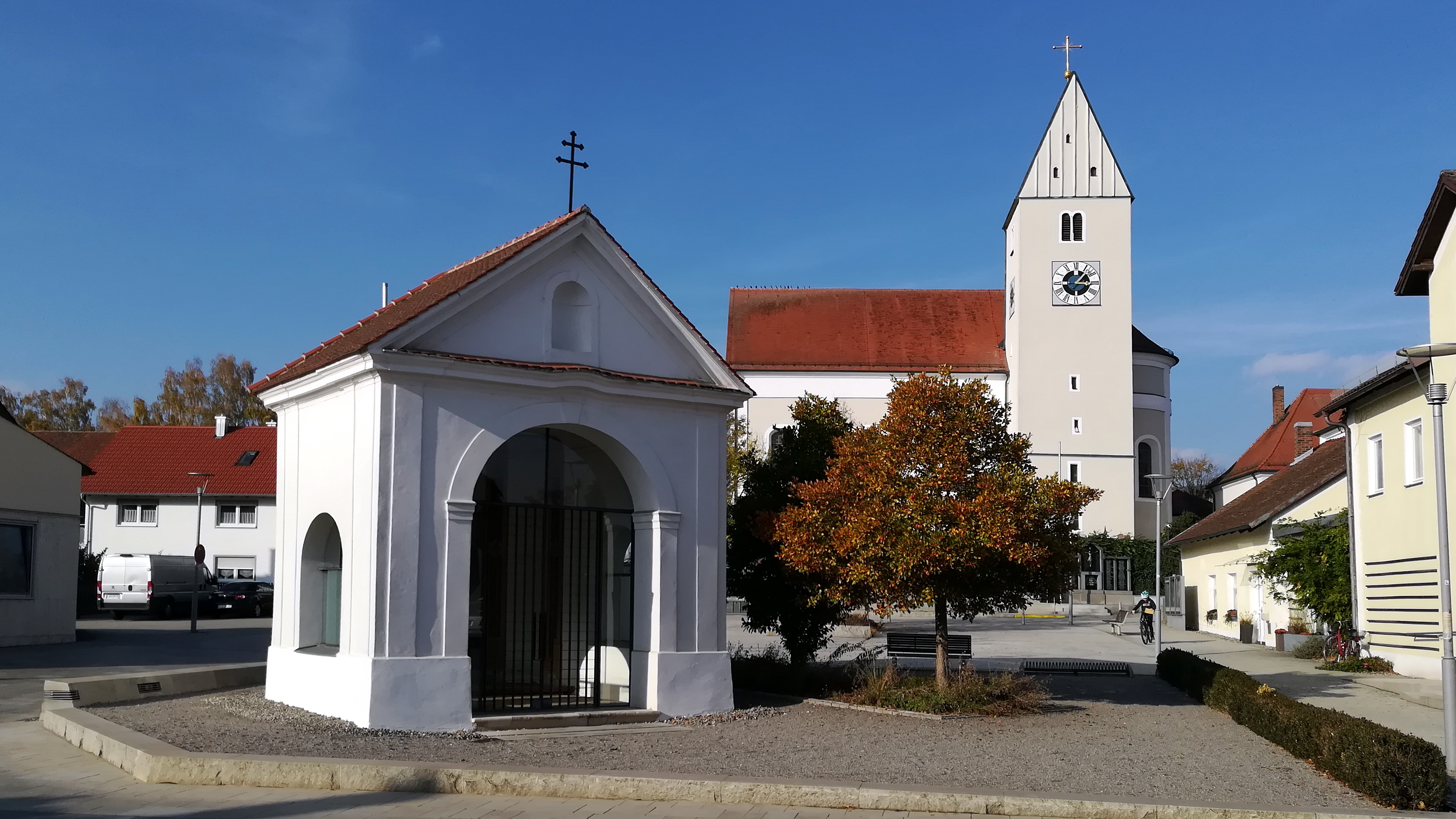
- Church square with the Chapel of Saint John of Nepomuk and the Church of Saint Lawrence

- Coat of arms

- Location of Alteglofsheim within Regensburg district
- Interactive map of Alteglofsheim
- Location within Germany Location within Bavaria
- Coordinates: 48°55′12″N 12°12′13″E
- Country: Germany
- State: Bavaria
- Admin. region: Oberpfalz
- District: Regensburg
- Municipal assoc.: Alteglofsheim

Government
  - Mayor (2020–26): Herbert Heidingsfelder (FW)

Area
  - Total: 13.23 km^{2} (5.11 sq mi)
- Elevation: 364 m (1,194 ft)

Population (2025-12-31)
  - Total: 3,228
  - Density: 244.0/km^{2} (631.9/sq mi)
- Time zone: UTC+01:00 (CET)
  - Summer (DST): UTC+02:00 (CEST)
- Postal codes: 93087
- Dialling codes: 09453
- Vehicle registration: R
- Website: www.alteglofsheim.de

Alteglofsheim is a municipality in the district of Regensburg in Bavaria in Germany.

The village was the site of a famous moonlight cavalry action on the evening of the Battle of Eckmühl on 22 April 1809. South of Alteglofsheim, 32 squadrons of Austrian Empire cavalry were defeated by as many as 60 squadrons belonging to the First French Empire, the Kingdom of Bavaria, and the Kingdom of Württemberg.
