= Pielenhofen-Wolfsegg =

- Verwaltungsgemeinschaft
- Location of Pielenhofen-Wolfsegg within Regensburg district
- Interactive map of Pielenhofen-Wolfsegg
- Location within Germany Location within Bavaria
- Coordinates: 49°06′N 11°59′E
- Country: Germany
- State: Bavaria
- Admin. region: Upper Palatinate
- District: Regensburg
- Seat: Wolfsegg
- Subdivisions: 2 municipalities

Area
  - Total: 29.86 km^{2} (11.53 sq mi)

Population (2025-12-31)
  - Total: 3,176
  - Density: 106.4/km^{2} (275.5/sq mi)
- Time zone: UTC+01:00 (CET)
  - Summer (DST): UTC+02:00 (CEST)
- Website: www.vg-pielenhofen-wolfsegg.de

Pielenhofen-Wolfsegg is a Verwaltungsgemeinschaft (municipal association) in the district of Regensburg in Bavaria, Germany. Its seat is in Wolfsegg.

It consists of the following municipalities:

1. Pielenhofen
2. Wolfsegg
