= Pielenhofen =

- Municipality
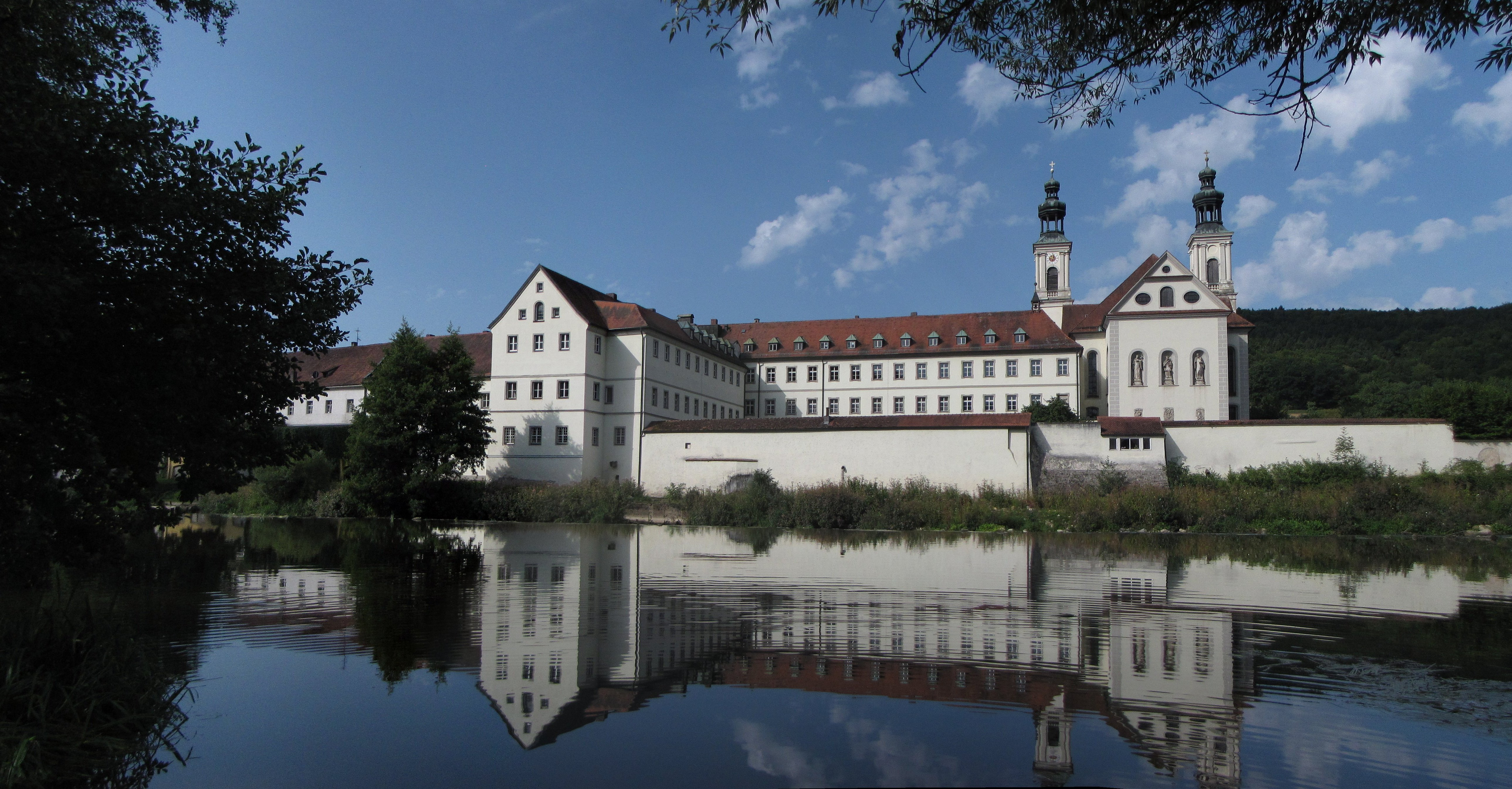
- Pielenhofen Abbey

- Coat of arms

- Location of Pielenhofen within Regensburg district
- Interactive map of Pielenhofen
- Location within Germany Location within Bavaria
- Coordinates: 49°4′22″N 11°57′23″E
- Country: Germany
- State: Bavaria
- Admin. region: Oberpfalz
- District: Regensburg
- Municipal assoc.: Pielenhofen-Wolfsegg

Government
  - Mayor (2020–26): Rudolf Gruber (FW)

Area
  - Total: 13.25 km^{2} (5.12 sq mi)
- Elevation: 335–463 m (1,099–1,519 ft)

Population (2025-12-31)
  - Total: 1,660
  - Density: 125/km^{2} (324/sq mi)
- Time zone: UTC+01:00 (CET)
  - Summer (DST): UTC+02:00 (CEST)
- Postal codes: 93188
- Dialling codes: 09409
- Vehicle registration: R
- Website: www.pielenhofen.de

Pielenhofen is a municipality in the district of Regensburg in Bavaria in Germany. It lies on the river Naab.

== Buildings ==
It is the site of Pielenhofen Abbey, formerly a Cistercian nunnery, now a house and school of the Visitandines.
