= Riekofen =

- Municipality
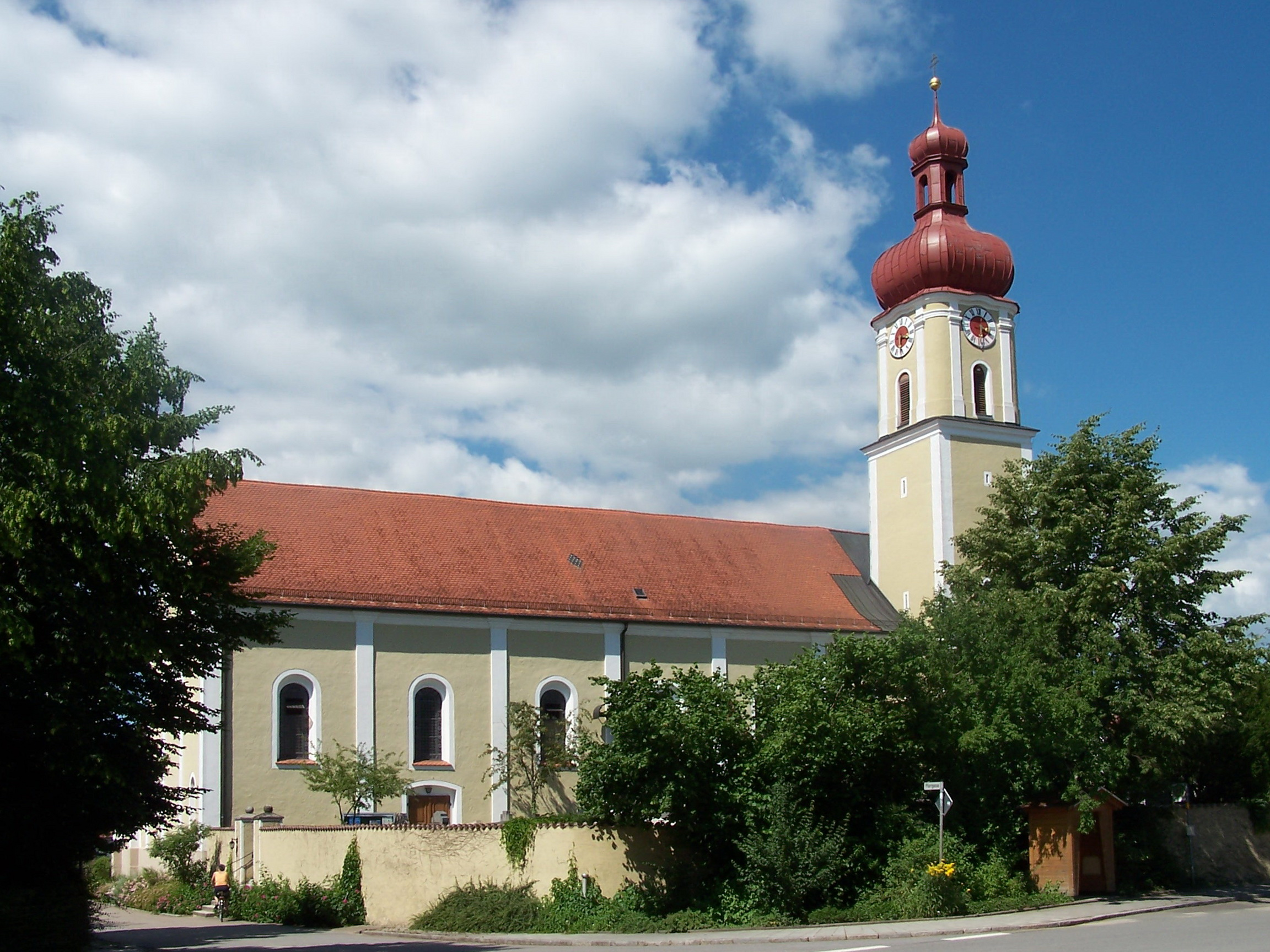
- Church of Saint John the Baptist

- Coat of arms

- Location of Riekofen within Regensburg district
- Interactive map of Riekofen
- Location within Germany Location within Bavaria
- Coordinates: 48°55′4″N 12°21′1″E
- Country: Germany
- State: Bavaria
- Admin. region: Oberpfalz
- District: Regensburg
- Municipal assoc.: Sünching

Government
  - Mayor (2020–26): Johann Schiller

Area
  - Total: 24.00 km^{2} (9.27 sq mi)
- Elevation: 335 m (1,099 ft)

Population (2025-12-31)
  - Total: 806
  - Density: 33.6/km^{2} (87.0/sq mi)
- Time zone: UTC+01:00 (CET)
  - Summer (DST): UTC+02:00 (CEST)
- Postal codes: 93104
- Dialling codes: 09480
- Vehicle registration: R
- Website: www.gemeinde-riekofen.de/

Riekofen is a municipality in the district of Regensburg in Bavaria in Germany.
