= Mötzing =

- Municipality
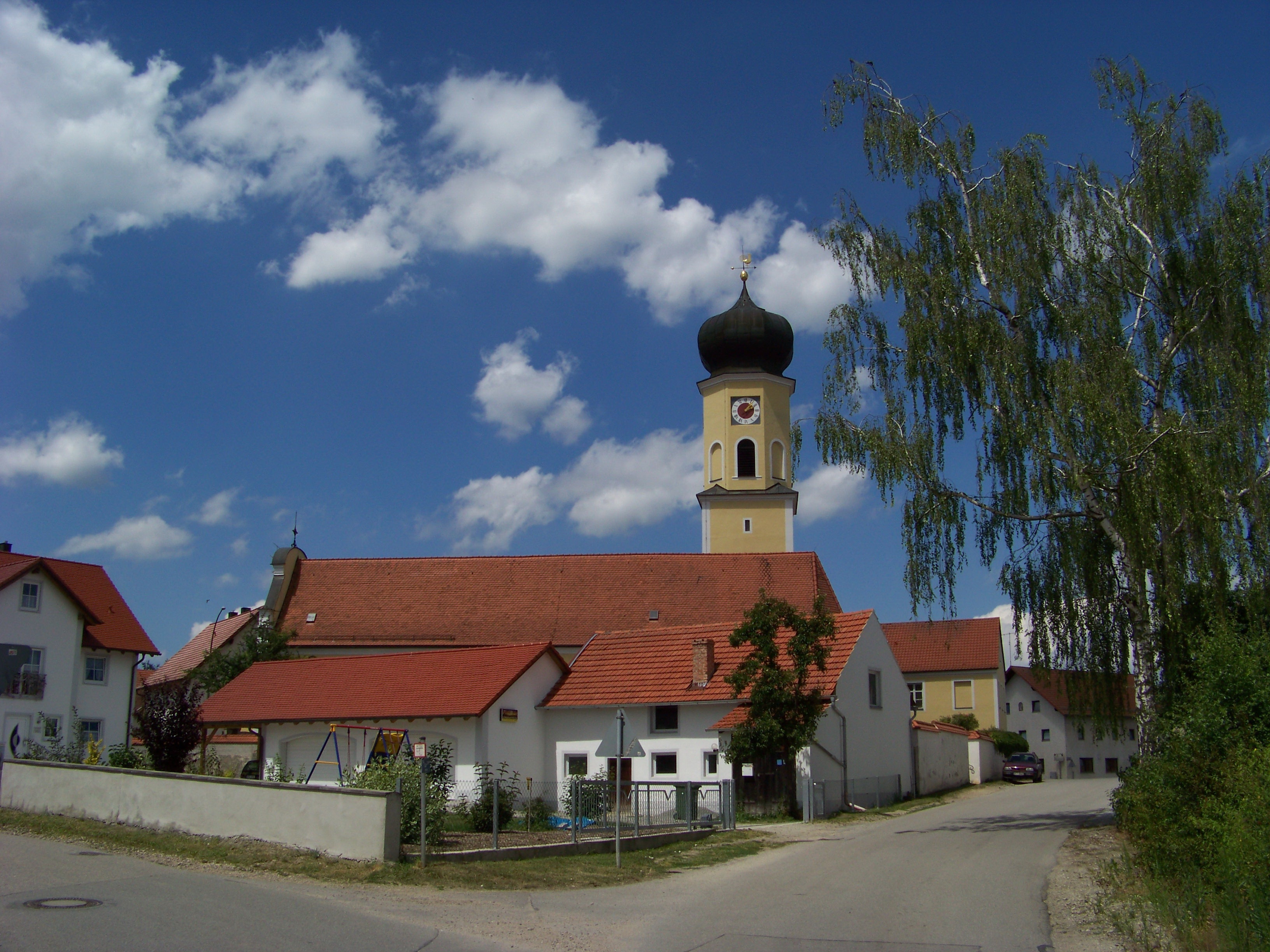
- Church of the Immaculate Conception of the Virgin Mary

- Coat of arms

- Location of Mötzing within Regensburg district
- Interactive map of Mötzing
- Location within Germany Location within Bavaria
- Coordinates: 48°53′39″N 12°22′26″E
- Country: Germany
- State: Bavaria
- Admin. region: Oberpfalz
- District: Regensburg
- Municipal assoc.: Sünching

Government
  - Mayor (2020–26): Reinhard Knott (FW)

Area
  - Total: 36.17 km^{2} (13.97 sq mi)
- Elevation: 338 m (1,109 ft)

Population (2025-12-31)
  - Total: 1,405
  - Density: 38.84/km^{2} (100.6/sq mi)
- Time zone: UTC+01:00 (CET)
  - Summer (DST): UTC+02:00 (CEST)
- Postal codes: 93099
- Dialling codes: 09429
- Vehicle registration: R
- Website: www.gemeinde-moetzing.de

Mötzing (German pronunciation: [ˈmœtsɪŋ]) is a municipality in the district of Regensburg in Bavaria in Germany.
