= Donaustauf (Verwaltungsgemeinschaft) =

- Verwaltungsgemeinschaft
- Location of Donaustauf within Regensburg district
- Interactive map of Donaustauf
- Location within Germany Location within Bavaria
- Coordinates: 49°02′N 12°12′E
- Country: Germany
- State: Bavaria
- Admin. region: Upper Palatinate
- District: Regensburg
- Seat: Donaustauf
- Subdivisions: 3 municipalities

Area
  - Total: 45.9 km^{2} (17.7 sq mi)

Population (2025-12-31)
  - Total: 7,667
  - Density: 167/km^{2} (433/sq mi)
- Time zone: UTC+01:00 (CET)
  - Summer (DST): UTC+02:00 (CEST)
- Website: www.vg-donaustauf.de

Donaustauf is a Verwaltungsgemeinschaft (municipal association) in the district of Regensburg in Bavaria, Germany. Its seat is in Donaustauf.

It consists of the following municipalities:

1. Altenthann
2. Bach an der Donau
3. Donaustauf
