= Bach an der Donau =

- Municipality
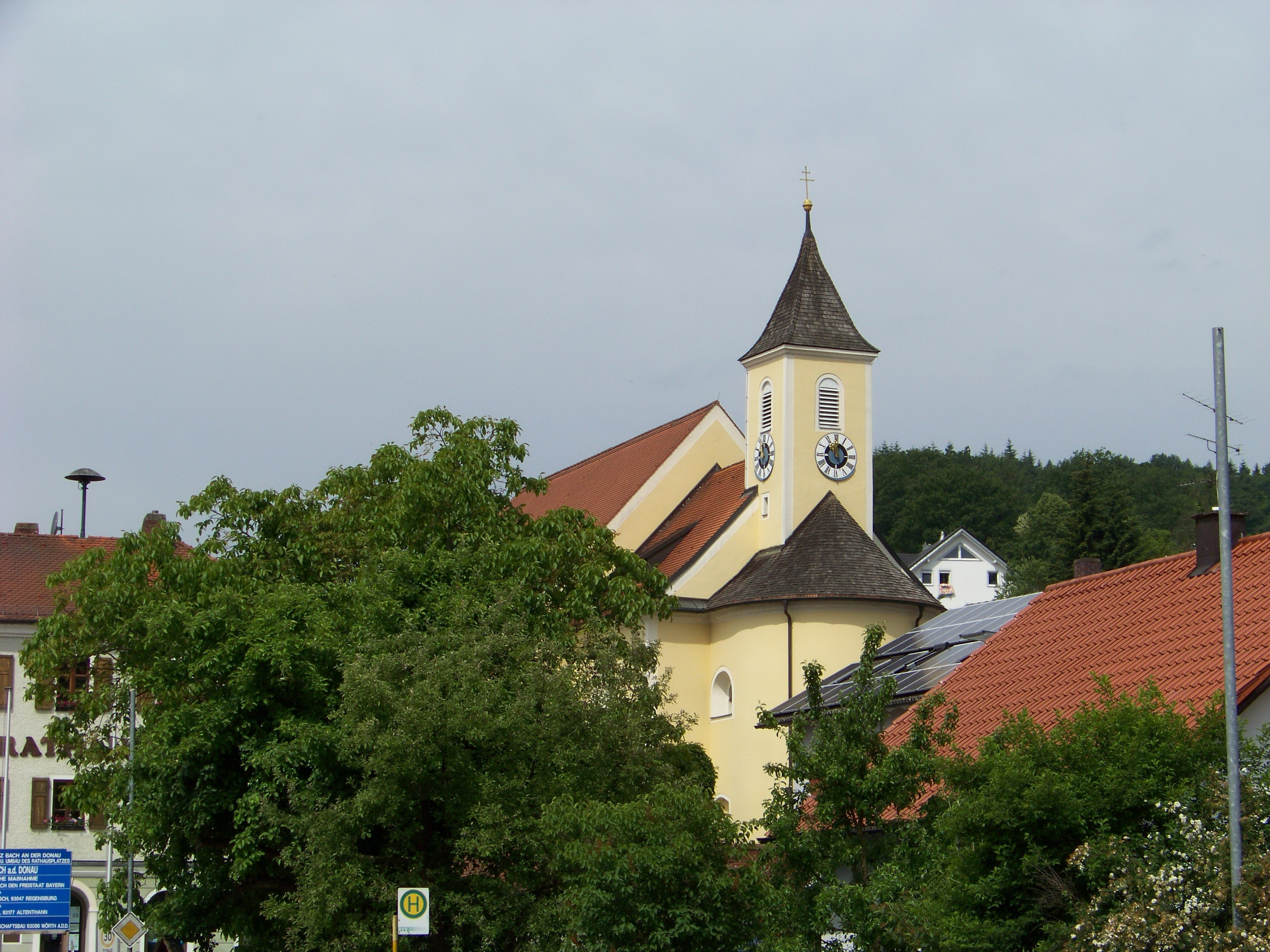
- Church of the Nativity of the Virgin Mary

- Coat of arms

- Location of Bach an der Donau within Regensburg district
- Interactive map of Bach an der Donau
- Location within Germany Location within Bavaria
- Coordinates: 49°1′15″N 12°18′14″E
- Country: Germany
- State: Bavaria
- Admin. region: Oberpfalz
- District: Regensburg
- Municipal assoc.: Donaustauf
- Subdivisions: 3 Ortsteile

Government
  - Mayor (2020–26): Thomas Schmalzl

Area
  - Total: 14.82 km^{2} (5.72 sq mi)
- Elevation: 334 m (1,096 ft)

Population (2025-12-31)
  - Total: 1,819
  - Density: 122.7/km^{2} (317.9/sq mi)
- Time zone: UTC+01:00 (CET)
  - Summer (DST): UTC+02:00 (CEST)
- Postal codes: 93090
- Dialling codes: 09403
- Vehicle registration: R
- Website: www.bach-donau.de

Bach is a municipality in the district of Regensburg in Bavaria in Germany. It lies on the Danube river.
