= Falkenstein (Verwaltungsgemeinschaft) =

- Verwaltungsgemeinschaft
- Location of Falkenstein within Cham district
- Interactive map of Falkenstein
- Location within Germany Location within Bavaria
- Coordinates: 49°06′N 12°29′E
- Country: Germany
- State: Bavaria
- Admin. region: Upper Palatinate
- District: Cham
- Seat: Falkenstein
- Subdivisions: 3 municipalities

Area
  - Total: 105.41 km^{2} (40.70 sq mi)

Population (2025-12-31)
  - Total: 6,962
  - Density: 66.05/km^{2} (171.1/sq mi)
- Time zone: UTC+01:00 (CET)
  - Summer (DST): UTC+02:00 (CEST)
- Website: markt-falkenstein.eu

Falkenstein is a Verwaltungsgemeinschaft (municipal association) in the district of Cham in Bavaria, Germany. Its seat is in Falkenstein. It consists of the following municipalities:

1. Falkenstein
2. Michelsneukirchen
3. Rettenbach
