= Pettendorf =

- Municipality
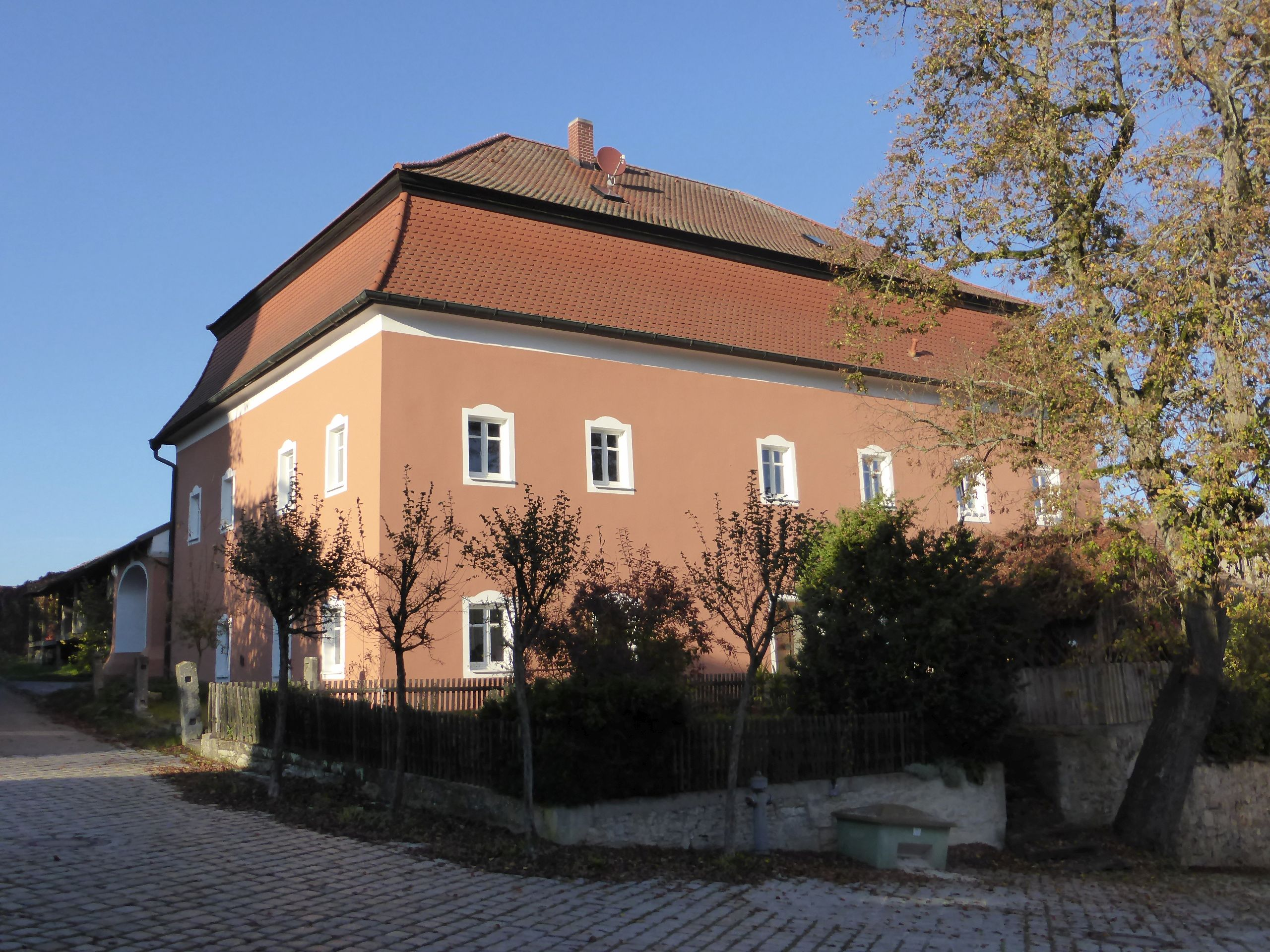
- Pettendorf Castle

- Coat of arms

- Location of Pettendorf within Regensburg district
- Interactive map of Pettendorf
- Location within Germany Location within Bavaria
- Coordinates: 49°03′34″N 12°00′21″E
- Country: Germany
- State: Bavaria
- Admin. region: Oberpfalz
- District: Regensburg
- Subdivisions: 19 Ortsteile

Government
  - Mayor (2020–26): Eduard Obermeier (FW)

Area
  - Total: 24.57 km^{2} (9.49 sq mi)
- Elevation: 455 m (1,493 ft)

Population (2025-12-31)
  - Total: 3,426
  - Density: 139.4/km^{2} (361.1/sq mi)
- Time zone: UTC+01:00 (CET)
  - Summer (DST): UTC+02:00 (CEST)
- Postal codes: 93186
- Dialling codes: 09409
- Vehicle registration: R
- Website: www.pettendorf.de

Pettendorf (German pronunciation: [ˈpɛtn̩ˌdɔʁf]) is a municipality in the district of Regensburg in Bavaria in Germany.

The river Naab empties into the Danube in the municipality.
