= Donaustauf =

- Municipality
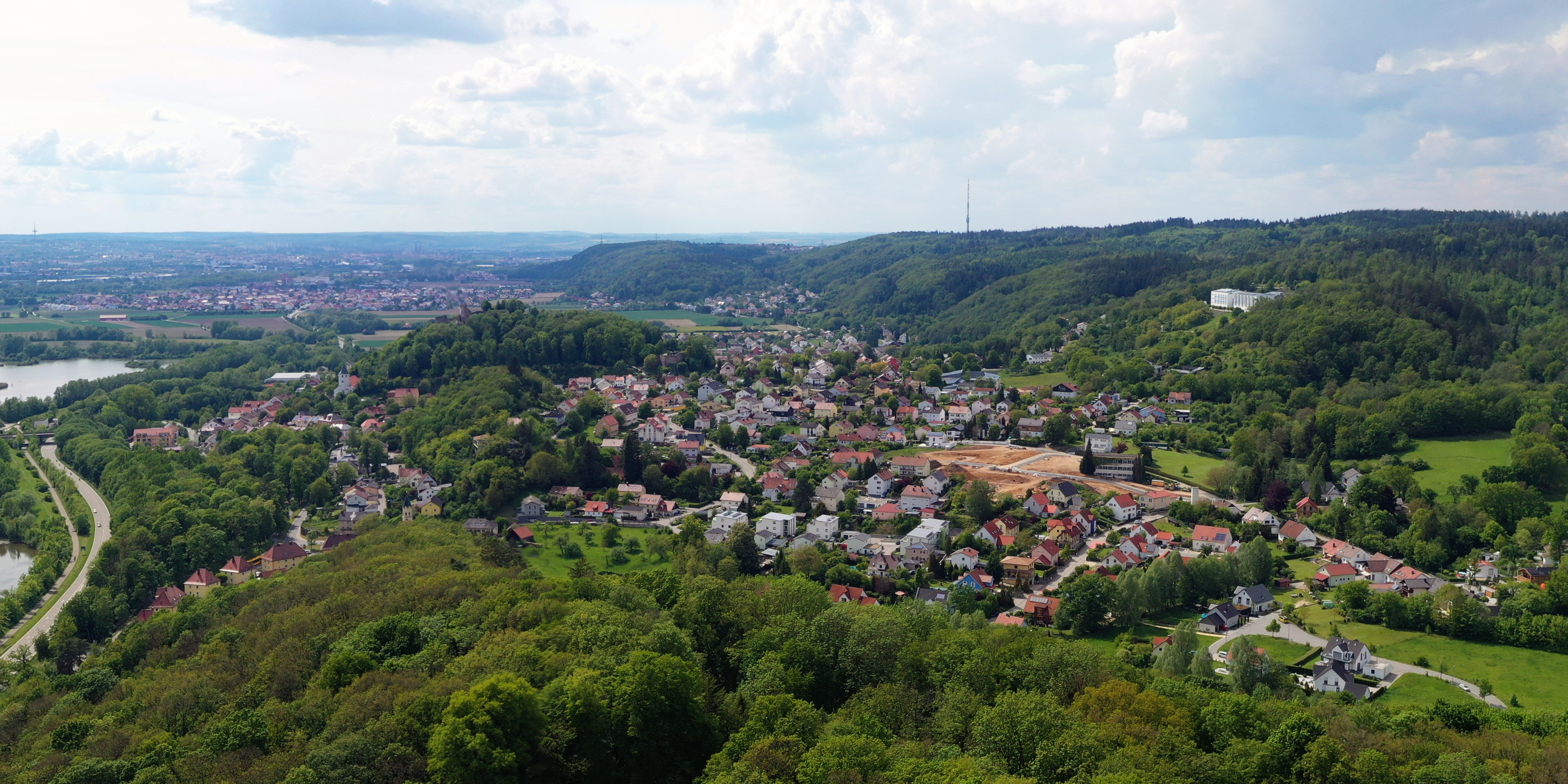
- Panorama view of Donaustauf from the Walhalla temple

- Coat of arms

- Location of Donaustauf within Regensburg district
- Interactive map of Donaustauf
- Location within Germany Location within Bavaria
- Coordinates: 49°01′44″N 12°12′29″E
- Country: Germany
- State: Bavaria
- Admin. region: Oberpfalz
- District: Regensburg
- Municipal assoc.: Donaustauf

Government
  - Mayor (2020–26): Jürgen Sommer (SPD)

Area
  - Total: 9.72 km^{2} (3.75 sq mi)
- Elevation: 358 m (1,175 ft)

Population (2025-12-31)
  - Total: 4,336
  - Density: 446/km^{2} (1,160/sq mi)
- Time zone: UTC+01:00 (CET)
  - Summer (DST): UTC+02:00 (CEST)
- Postal codes: 93093
- Dialling codes: 09403
- Vehicle registration: R
- Website: www.donaustauf.de

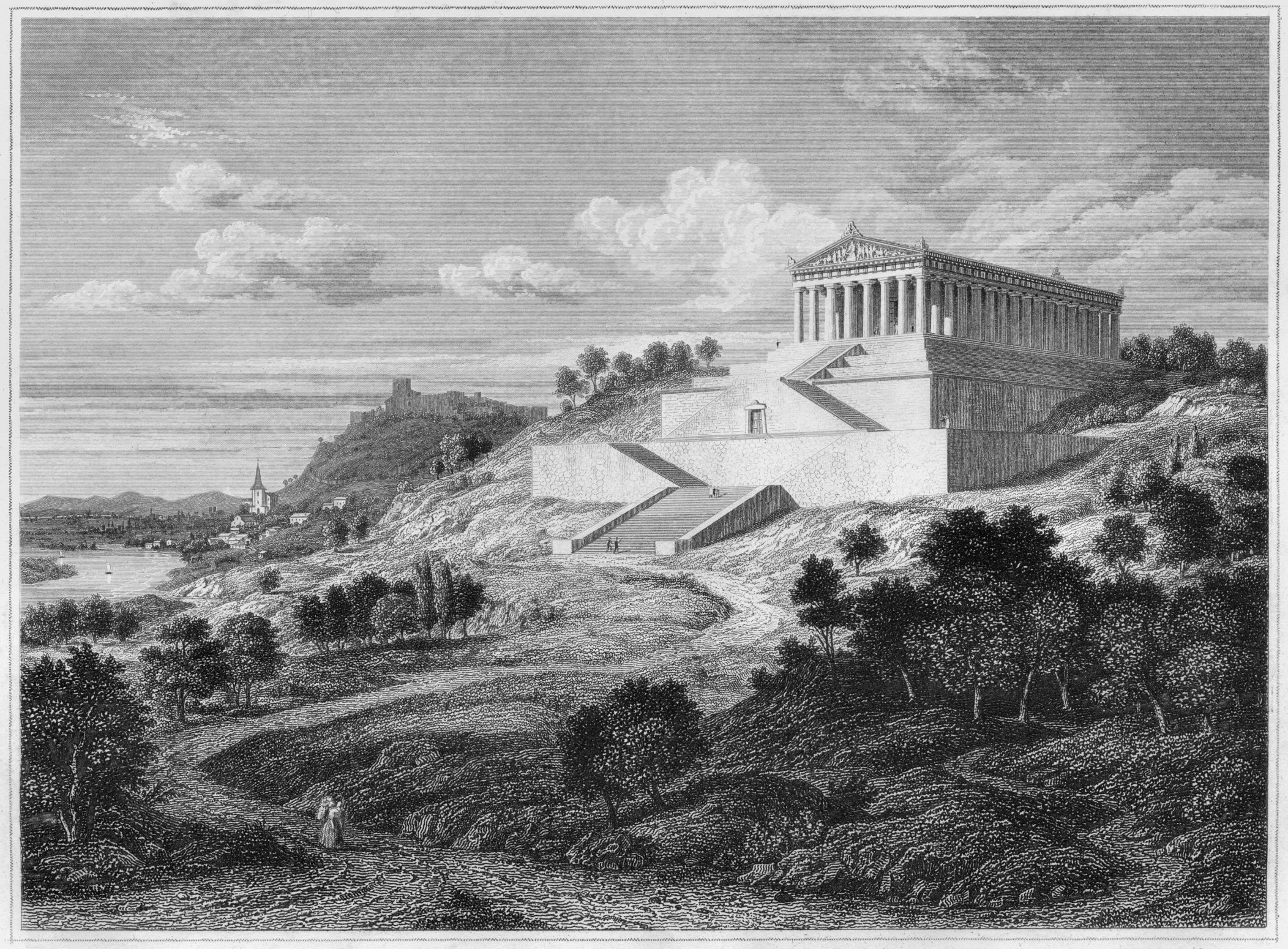
Walhalla with the village of Donaustauf (around 1850)

Donaustauf (German pronunciation: [ˈdoːnaʊʃtaʊf]) is a market town in Bavaria, 5 km (3 mi) east of Regensburg at the foothills of the Bavarian Forest. The ruins of a medieval castle, presumably erected between 914 and 930, tower above the small town. Situated nearby on a hill rising from the Danube is the imposing Teutonic temple of fame, Walhalla, a costly reproduction of the Parthenon in Athens. The Walhalla was commissioned by Ludwig I, King of Bavaria, and inaugurated on 18 October 1842.

Donaustauf had been a fief in the Duchy of Bavaria, but in 1710 it was transferred to Bishopric of Regensburg. In 1803 it joined the newly formed Principality of Regensburg, but just 7 years later, at the Treaty of Paris it was returned to Bavaria, which, in turn, endowed it to the princes of Thurn and Taxis. In 1899, the princely house was elevated to a dukedom, receiving the title of Duke of Wörth and Donaustauf.

Maximilian Karl, Prince of Thurn and Taxis and his family, who liked the romantic scenery of Donaustauf, moved to the newly constructed Donaustauf palace in 1843, which, however, was completely destroyed during a blaze on 4 March 1880.
