= Sünching (Verwaltungsgemeinschaft) =

- Verwaltungsgemeinschaft
- Location of Sünching within Regensburg district
- Interactive map of Sünching
- Location within Germany Location within Bavaria
- Coordinates: 48°53′N 12°21′E
- Country: Germany
- State: Bavaria
- Admin. region: Upper Palatinate
- District: Regensburg
- Seat: Sünching
- Subdivisions: 4 municipalities

Area
  - Total: 106.82 km^{2} (41.24 sq mi)

Population (2025-12-31)
  - Total: 6,383
  - Density: 59.75/km^{2} (154.8/sq mi)
- Time zone: UTC+01:00 (CET)
  - Summer (DST): UTC+02:00 (CEST)

Sünching is a Verwaltungsgemeinschaft (municipal association) in the district of Regensburg in Bavaria, Germany. Its seat is in Sünching.

It consists of the following municipalities:

1. Aufhausen
2. Mötzing
3. Riekofen
4. Sünching
