= Zeitlarn =

- Municipality
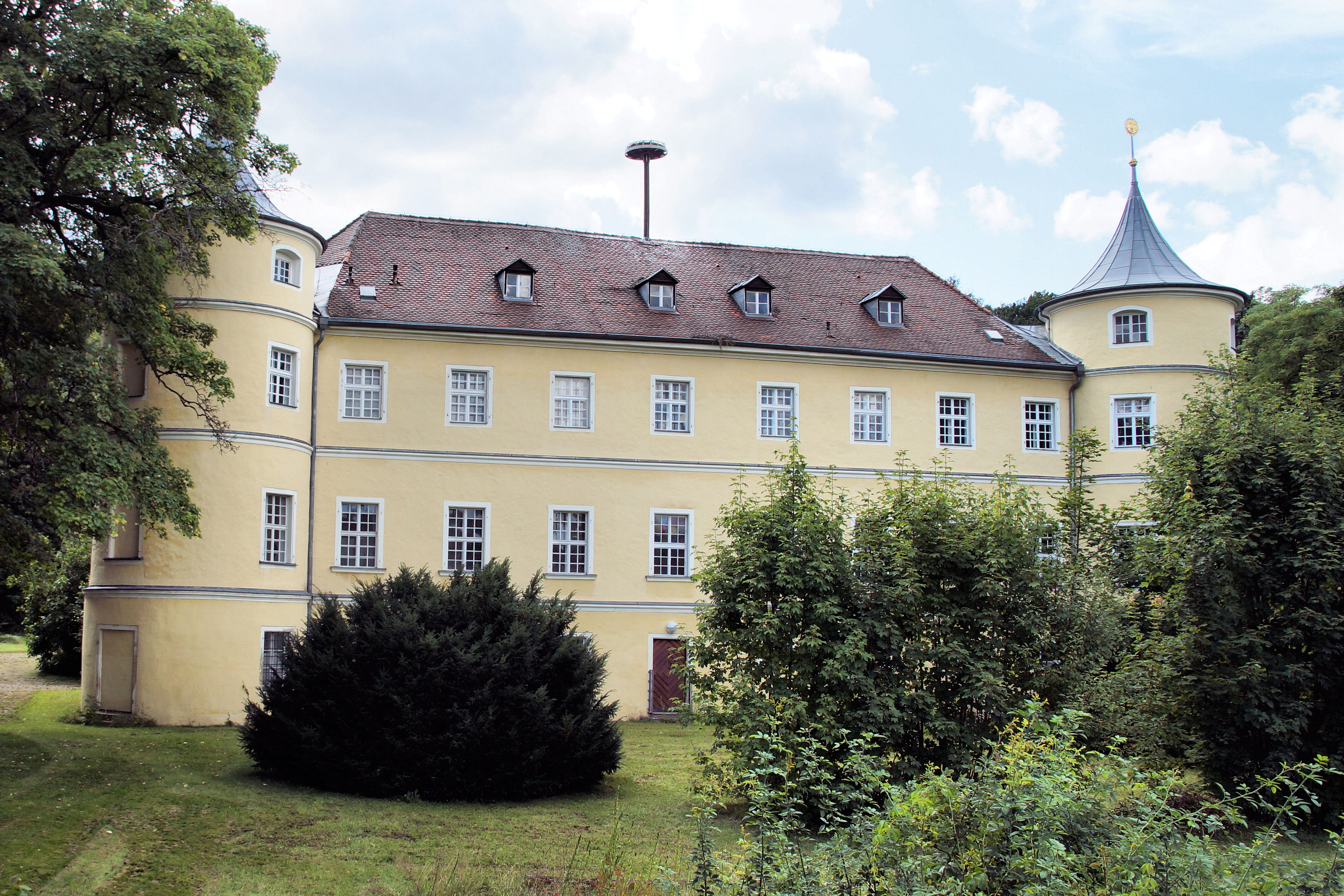
- Regendorf Castle

- Coat of arms

- Location of Zeitlarn within Regensburg district
- Interactive map of Zeitlarn
- Location within Germany Location within Bavaria
- Coordinates: 49°04′33″N 12°06′19″E
- Country: Germany
- State: Bavaria
- Admin. region: Oberpfalz
- District: Regensburg

Government
  - Mayor (2020–26): Andrea Dobsch (FW)

Area
  - Total: 16.11 km^{2} (6.22 sq mi)
- Elevation: 333 m (1,093 ft)

Population (2025-12-31)
  - Total: 5,446
  - Density: 338.1/km^{2} (875.5/sq mi)
- Time zone: UTC+01:00 (CET)
  - Summer (DST): UTC+02:00 (CEST)
- Postal codes: 93197
- Dialling codes: 0941, 09402
- Vehicle registration: R
- Website: www.gemeinde-zeitlarn.de

Zeitlarn is a municipality in the district of Regensburg in Bavaria in Germany.
