= Wolfsegg, Bavaria =

Wolfsegg
- Municipality
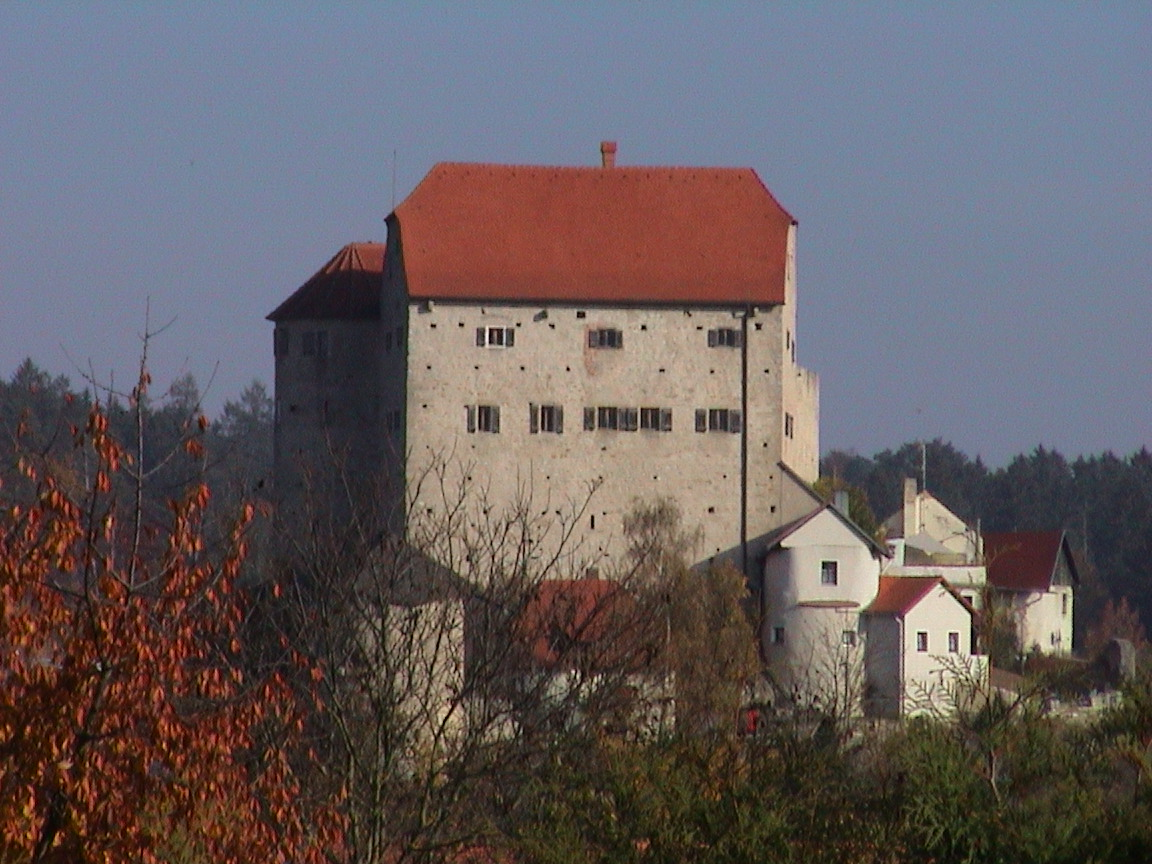
- Wolfsegg Castle

- Coat of arms

- Location of Wolfsegg within Regensburg district
- Interactive map of Wolfsegg
- Location within Germany Location within Bavaria
- Coordinates: 49°6′27″N 11°58′39″E
- Country: Germany
- State: Bavaria
- Admin. region: Oberpfalz
- District: Regensburg
- Municipal assoc.: Pielenhofen-Wolfsegg
- Subdivisions: 5 Ortsteile

Government
  - Mayor (2020–26): Roland Frank

Area
  - Total: 7.46 km^{2} (2.88 sq mi)
- Elevation: 370–420 m (1,210–1,380 ft)

Population (2025-12-31)
  - Total: 1,516
  - Density: 203/km^{2} (526/sq mi)
- Time zone: UTC+01:00 (CET)
  - Summer (DST): UTC+02:00 (CEST)
- Postal codes: 93195
- Dialling codes: 09409
- Vehicle registration: R
- Website: www.wolfsegg.de

Wolfsegg (Bavarian: Woifsegg) is a municipality in the district of Regensburg in Bavaria in Germany.
