= Wörth an der Donau (Verwaltungsgemeinschaft) =

- Verwaltungsgemeinschaft
- Location of Wörth an der Donau within Regensburg district
- Interactive map of Wörth an der Donau
- Location within Germany Location within Bavaria
- Coordinates: 49°00′N 12°24′E
- Country: Germany
- State: Bavaria
- Admin. region: Upper Palatinate
- District: Regensburg
- Seat: Wörth an der Donau
- Subdivisions: 2 municipalities

Area
  - Total: 82.76 km^{2} (31.95 sq mi)

Population (2025-12-31)
  - Total: 7,382
  - Density: 89.20/km^{2} (231.0/sq mi)
- Time zone: UTC+01:00 (CET)
  - Summer (DST): UTC+02:00 (CEST)
- Website: www.woerth-donau.de

Wörth an der Donau is a Verwaltungsgemeinschaft (municipal association) in the district of Regensburg in Bavaria, Germany. Its seat is in Wörth an der Donau.

It consists of the following municipalities:

1. Brennberg
2. Wörth an der Donau
