= Hagelstadt =

- Municipality
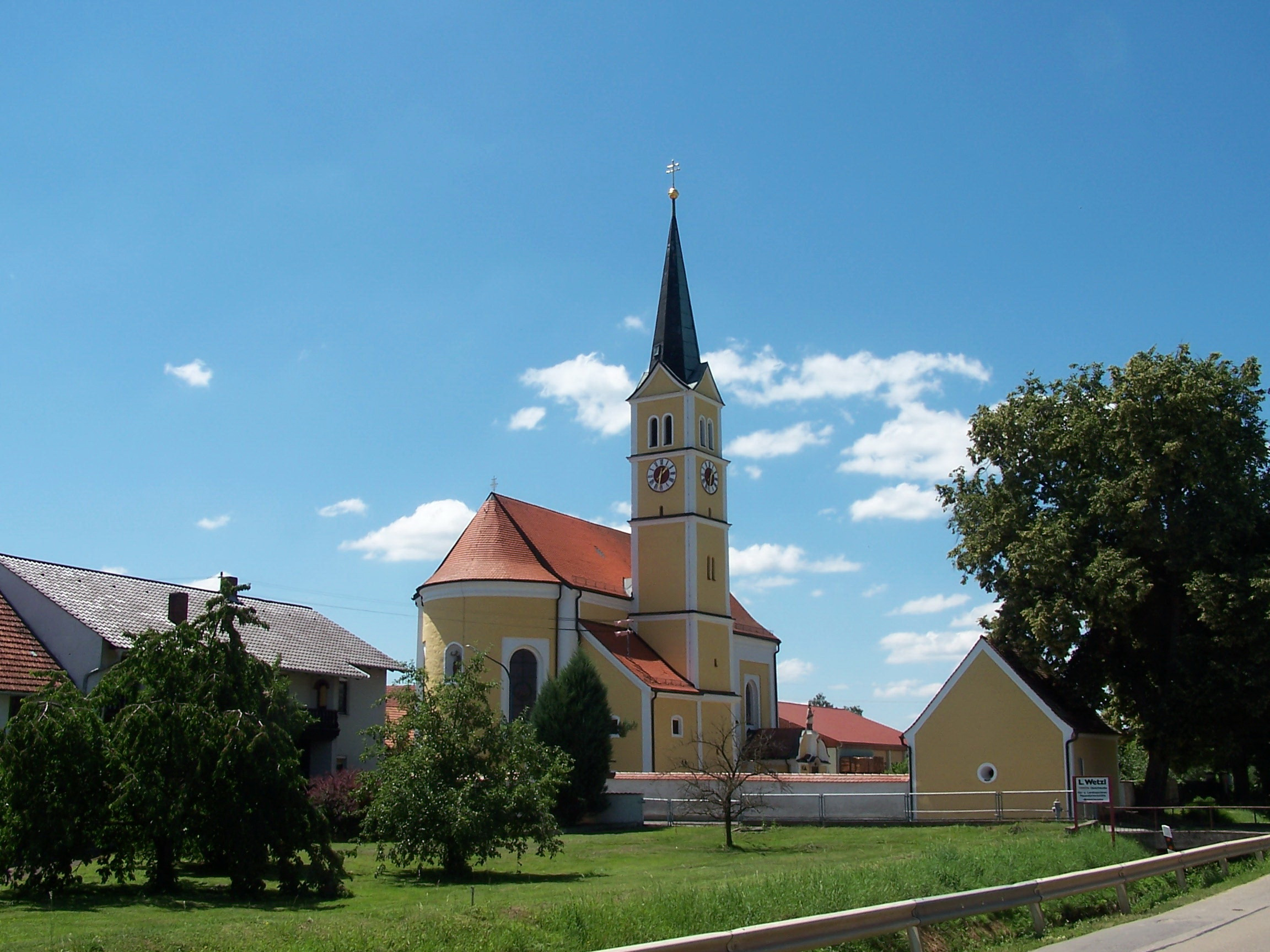
- Church of Saint John the Baptist in Langenerling

- Coat of arms

- Location of Hagelstadt within Regensburg district
- Interactive map of Hagelstadt
- Location within Germany Location within Bavaria
- Coordinates: 48°53′45″N 12°13′01″E
- Country: Germany
- State: Bavaria
- Admin. region: Oberpfalz
- District: Regensburg
- Subdivisions: 5 Ortsteile

Government
  - Mayor (2020–26): Thomas Scheuerer

Area
  - Total: 20.75 km^{2} (8.01 sq mi)
- Elevation: 368 m (1,207 ft)

Population (2025-12-31)
  - Total: 2,031
  - Density: 97.88/km^{2} (253.5/sq mi)
- Time zone: UTC+01:00 (CET)
  - Summer (DST): UTC+02:00 (CEST)
- Postal codes: 93095
- Dialling codes: 09453, 09406 (Langenerling), 09454 (Gailsbach)
- Vehicle registration: R
- Website: www.hagelstadt.de

Hagelstadt is a municipality in the district of Regensburg in Bavaria in Germany.
