= Alteglofsheim (Verwaltungsgemeinschaft) =

- Verwaltungsgemeinschaft
- Location of Alteglofsheim within Regensburg district
- Interactive map of Alteglofsheim
- Location within Germany Location within Bavaria
- Coordinates: 48°55′N 12°12′E
- Country: Germany
- State: Bavaria
- Admin. region: Upper Palatinate
- District: Regensburg
- Seat: Alteglofsheim
- Subdivisions: 2 municipalities

Area
  - Total: 28.5 km^{2} (11.0 sq mi)

Population (2025-12-31)
  - Total: 4,836
  - Density: 170/km^{2} (439/sq mi)
- Time zone: UTC+01:00 (CET)
  - Summer (DST): UTC+02:00 (CEST)
- Website: www.vg-alteglofsheim.de

Alteglofsheim is a Verwaltungsgemeinschaft (municipal association) in the district of Regensburg in Bavaria, Germany. Its seat is in Alteglofsheim.

It consists of the following municipalities:

1. Alteglofsheim
2. Pfakofen
