= Lappersdorf =

- Municipality
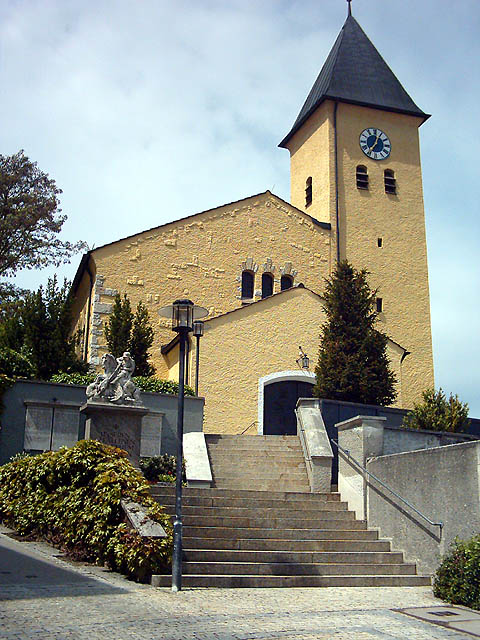
- Assumption of the Virgin Mary Church

- Coat of arms

- Location of Lappersdorf within Regensburg district
- Interactive map of Lappersdorf
- Location within Germany Location within Bavaria
- Coordinates: 49°03′09″N 12°05′25″E
- Country: Germany
- State: Bavaria
- Admin. region: Oberpfalz
- District: Regensburg

Government
  - Mayor (2020–26): Christian Hauner (FW)

Area
  - Total: 31.66 km^{2} (12.22 sq mi)
- Elevation: 341 m (1,119 ft)

Population (2025-12-31)
  - Total: 13,477
  - Density: 425.7/km^{2} (1,103/sq mi)
- Time zone: UTC+01:00 (CET)
  - Summer (DST): UTC+02:00 (CEST)
- Postal codes: 93138
- Dialling codes: 0941
- Vehicle registration: R
- Website: www.lappersdorf.de

Lappersdorf is a municipality in the district of Regensburg, in Bavaria, Germany. It is situated on the river Regen, 4 km north of Regensburg.
