= Wenzenbach =

- Municipality
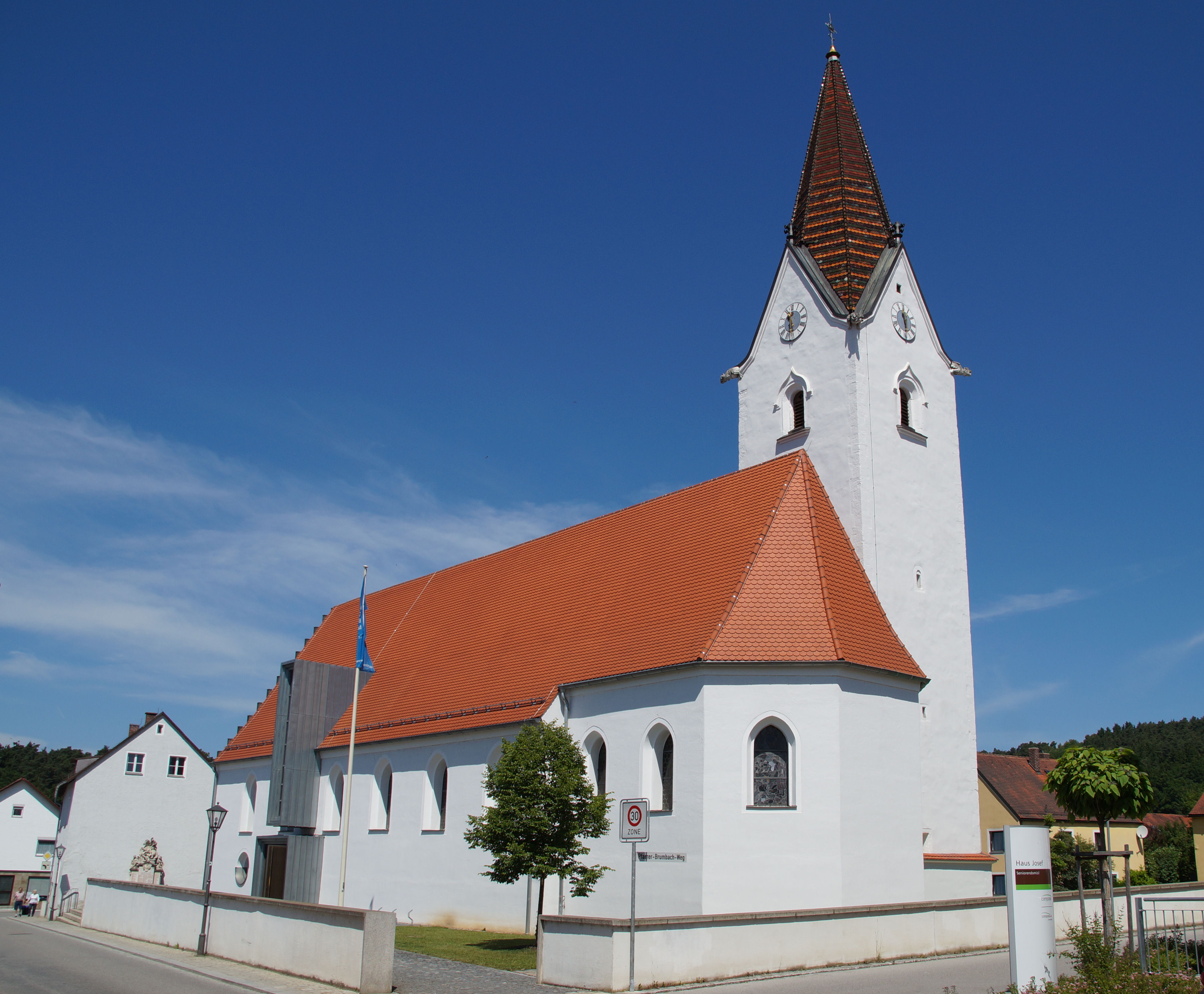
- Church of Saint Peter

- Coat of arms

- Location of Wenzenbach within Regensburg district
- Interactive map of Wenzenbach
- Location within Germany Location within Bavaria
- Coordinates: 49°04′29″N 12°11′40″E
- Country: Germany
- State: Bavaria
- Admin. region: Oberpfalz
- District: Regensburg

Government
  - Mayor (2020–26): Sebastian Koch (SPD)

Area
  - Total: 29.85 km^{2} (11.53 sq mi)
- Elevation: 337–475 m (1,106–1,558 ft)

Population (2025-12-31)
  - Total: 8,703
  - Density: 291.6/km^{2} (755.1/sq mi)
- Time zone: UTC+01:00 (CET)
  - Summer (DST): UTC+02:00 (CEST)
- Postal codes: 93173
- Dialling codes: 09407
- Vehicle registration: R
- Website: www.wenzenbach.de

Wenzenbach is a municipality in the district of Regensburg in Bavaria in Germany.
