= Pfakofen =

- Municipality
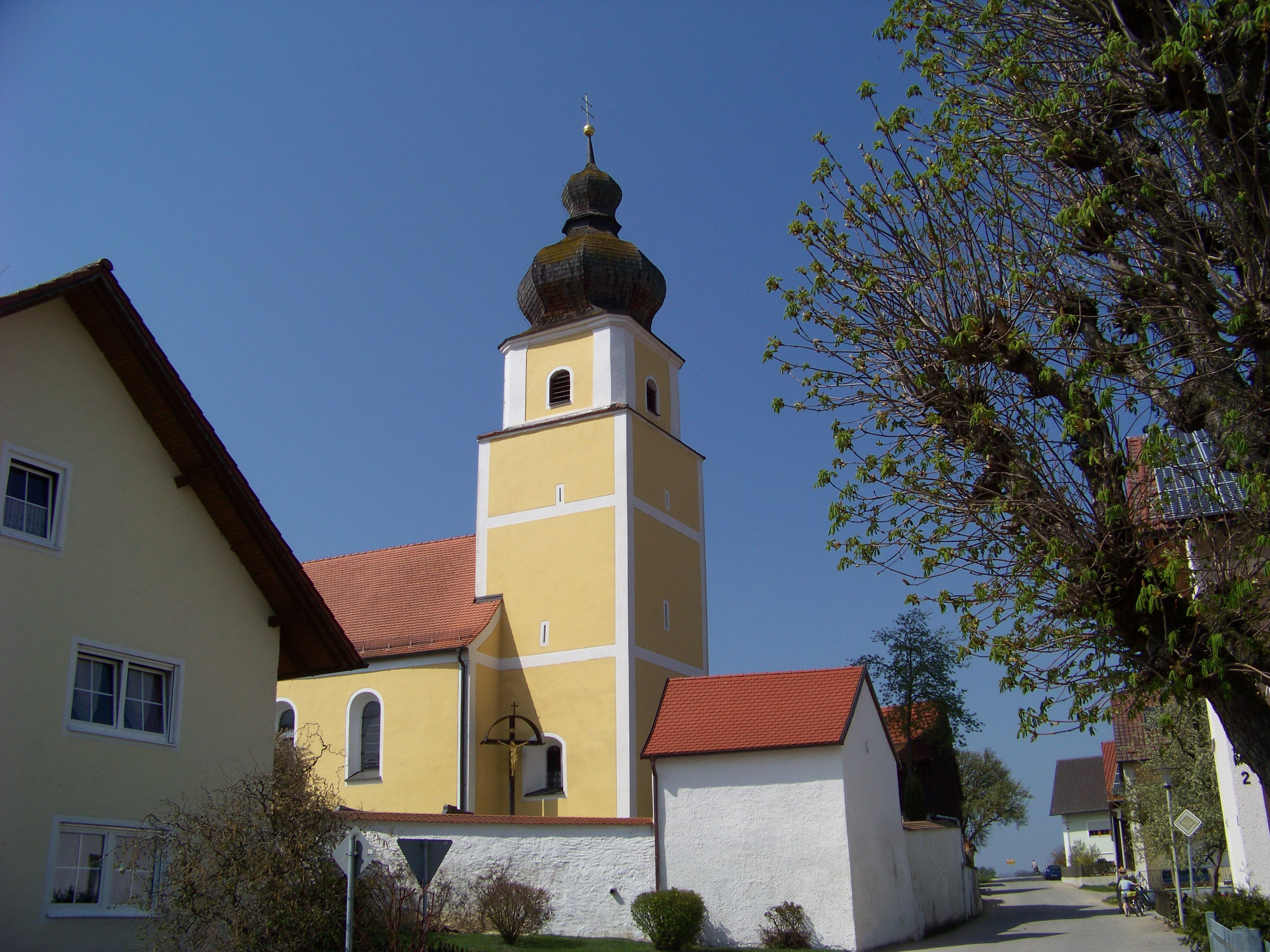
- Church of Saint John the Baptist in Rogging

- Coat of arms

- Location of Pfakofen within Regensburg district
- Interactive map of Pfakofen
- Location within Germany Location within Bavaria
- Coordinates: 48°51′25″N 12°13′29″E
- Country: Germany
- State: Bavaria
- Admin. region: Oberpfalz
- District: Regensburg
- Municipal assoc.: Alteglofsheim

Government
  - Mayor (2020–26): Christian Gangkofer

Area
  - Total: 15.29 km^{2} (5.90 sq mi)
- Elevation: 363 m (1,191 ft)

Population (2025-12-31)
  - Total: 1,608
  - Density: 105.2/km^{2} (272.4/sq mi)
- Time zone: UTC+01:00 (CET)
  - Summer (DST): UTC+02:00 (CEST)
- Postal codes: 93101
- Dialling codes: 09451
- Vehicle registration: R
- Website: www.pfakofen.de

Pfakofen is a municipality in the district of Regensburg in Bavaria in Germany.
