= Pielenhofen Abbey =

Coordinates: 49°4′22″N 11°57′27″E

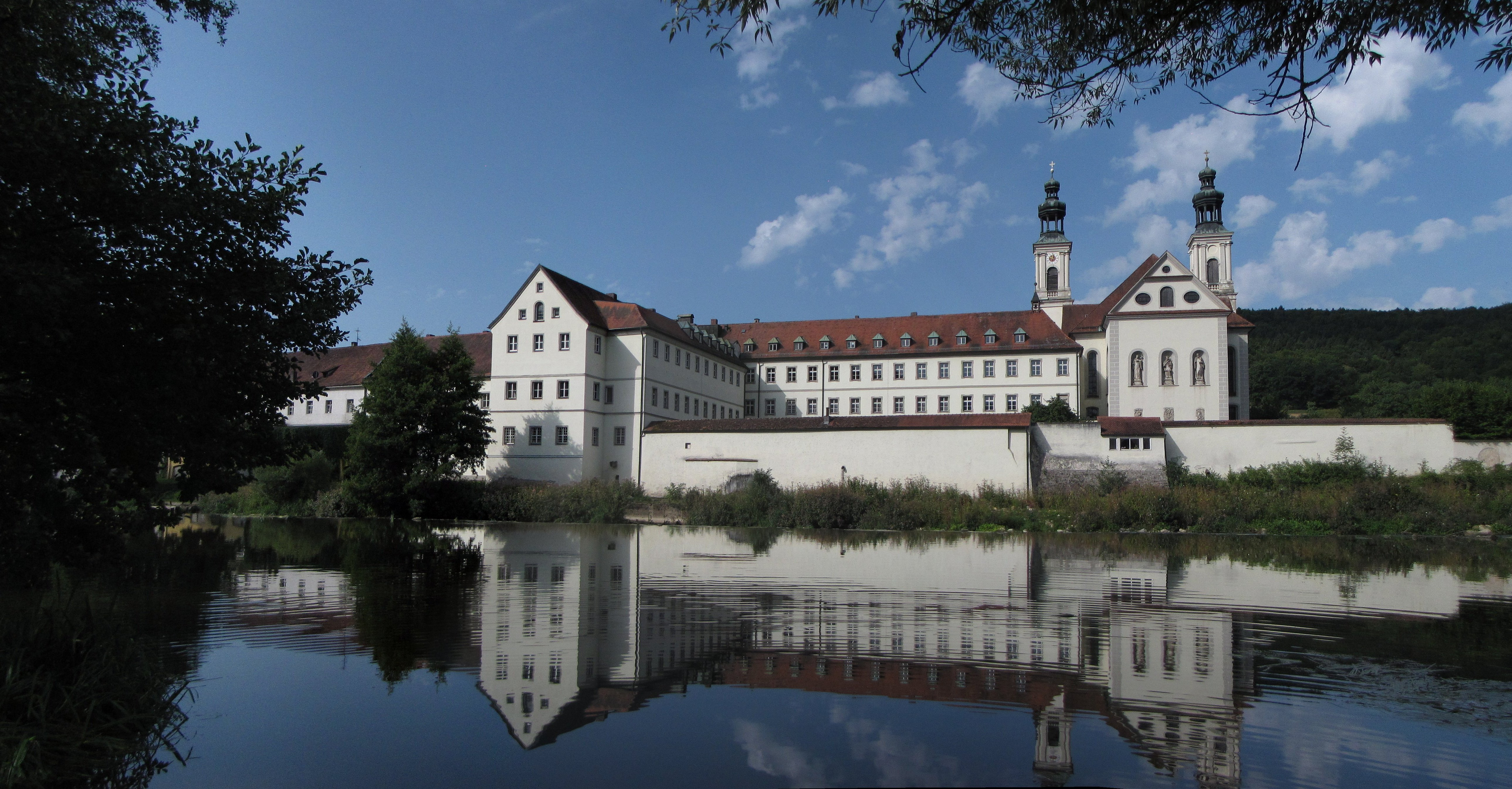
View of Pielenhofen Abbey

Pielenhofen Abbey (German: Kloster Pielenhofen) is a former Cistercian nunnery (founded in 1240), in Pielenhofen in the valley of the Naab, Bavaria, Germany. It was occupied until 2010 by the Visitandines, also known as the Salesian Sisters. The Diocese of Regensburg maintains a school here.

== History ==
The abbey at Pielenhofen for Cistercian nuns, dedicated to the Assumption of the Blessed Virgin Mary, was founded in 1240 by the lords of Hohenfels and Ehrenfels. In 1542, during the Reformation in Pfalz-Neuburg, it was placed under secular administration. In 1655, it was subordinated to Kaisheim Abbey as a sub-priory.

During the secularisation of Bavaria in 1803, the priory was dissolved; the nuns' church became a parish church. In 1806, Carmelite nuns from Munich and Neuburg an der Donau moved into the premises as a joint nunnery. In 1838, the Visitandines, also known as Salesian Sisters, bought it, and established a girls' school here. In 1981, the Pielenhofen Primary School, a boarding school of the Regensburg Cathedral Choir, replaced the earlier school. In 2010, the five remaining nuns moved to the community of the Visitandines at Zangberg.

== Abbey church ==
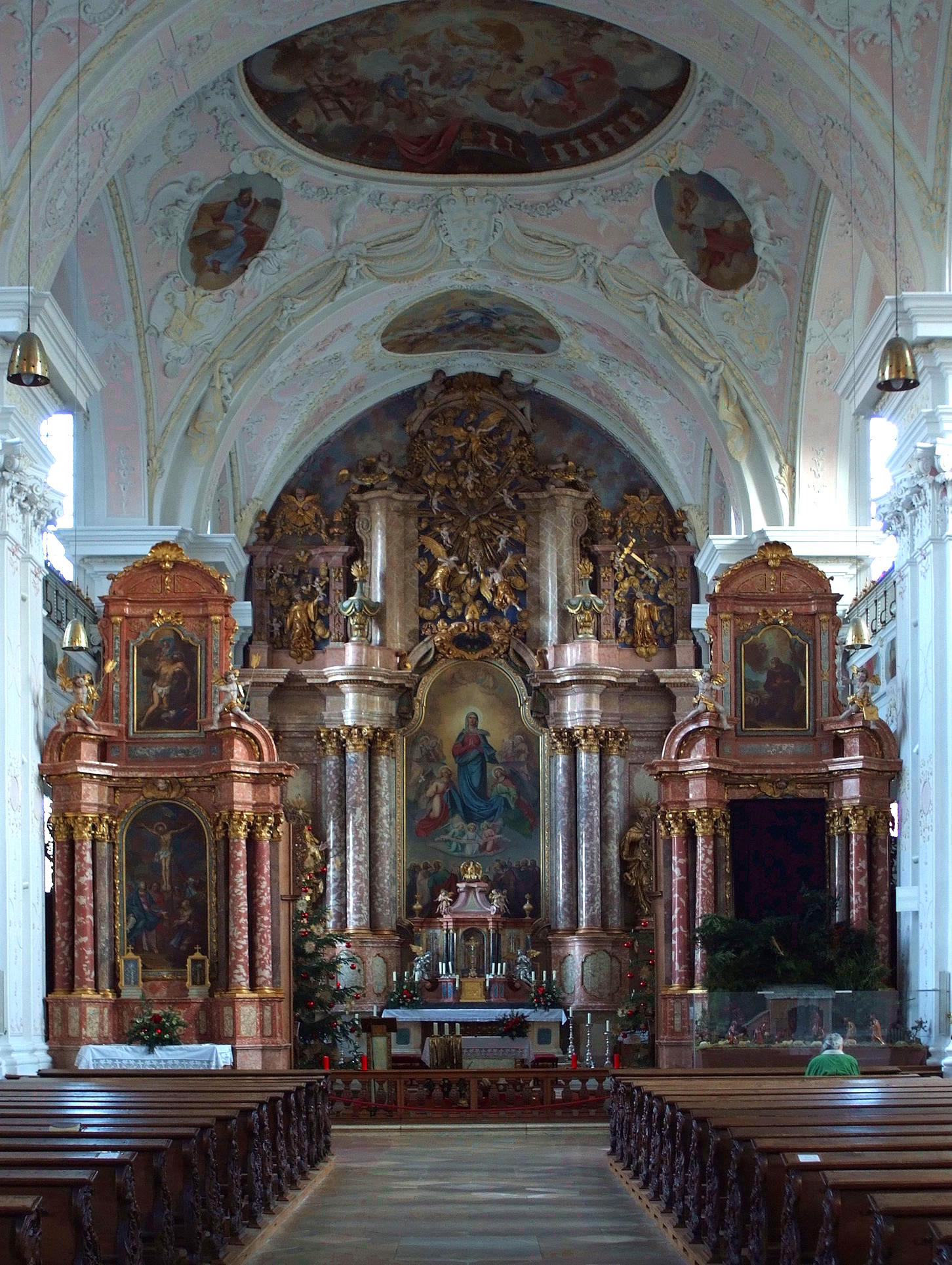
Altar of the abbey church

The Baroque church has two towers of three storeys, two aisles and a transept, under a cupola in the centre. The church contains a late Baroque high altar with eight columns. The ceiling with a depiction of the Holy Trinity is by Jacob Carl Stauder. The pictures of the twelve apostles are by Johann Gebhard of Prüfening Abbey.

== Sources and external links ==
- Klöster in Bayern: Pielenhofen - Zisterze im Naabtal (in German)
- Schwestern der Heimsuchung Mariens Deutsche Föderation: Pielenhofen (in German)
