= Regensburg (district) =

Coordinates: 49°05′N 12°10′E

- District
- Flag Coat of arms
- Country: Germany
- State: Bavaria
- Adm. region: Upper Palatinate
- Capital: Regensburg

Government
  - District admin.: Tanja Schweiger (FW)

Area
  - Total: 1,396 km^{2} (539 sq mi)

Population (31 December 2025)
  - Total: 196,410
  - Density: 140.7/km^{2} (364.4/sq mi)
- Time zone: UTC+01:00 (CET)
  - Summer (DST): UTC+02:00 (CEST)
- Vehicle registration: R
- Website: landkreis-regensburg.de

Regensburg is a Landkreis (district) in Bavaria, Germany. It is bounded by (from the north, in clockwise direction) the districts of Schwandorf, Cham, Straubing-Bogen, Landshut, Kelheim and Neumarkt. The city of Regensburg is enclosed by it, but is not part of the district; nonetheless it is its administrative seat.

== History ==
The region became a part of Bavaria in the late 12th century, when the line of the counts of Regensburg and Stefling came to an end. While Regensburg became a Free Imperial City (meaning subordinate to the emperor only), the surrounding lands were Bavarian property.

On 1 April 1938, the city acquired the municipalities of Dechbetten, Großprüfening, and Ziegetsdorf from the Regensburg District Office (Bezirksamt). On 1 January 1939—as was the case throughout the rest of the German Reich—the designation "Landkreis" (rural district) was introduced. Thus, the Regensburg District Office became the Regensburg Rural District.

While the district dates back to medieval times, its present shape was established in 1972.

== Geography ==
The district is located on either side of the Danube. Another major river is the Regen which joins the Danube in Regensburg. The northernmost parts of the district are occupied by the foothills of the Bavarian Forest.

== Coat of arms ==
The coat of arms displays:

- the blue and white checked pattern of Bavaria
- the red and white arms of the Regensburg abbey
- the red cross from the arms of Prüfening Abbey

== Towns and municipalities ==
Clickable map of towns and municipalities in the district

Towns
1. Hemau
2. Neutraubling

Märkte

1. Beratzhausen
2. Lappersdorf
3. Nittendorf
4. Regenstauf
5. Schierling
Municipalities
1. Barbing
2. Bernhardswald
3. Hagelstadt
4. Köfering
5. Mintraching
6. Obertraubling
7. Pentling
8. Pettendorf

9. Pfatter
10. Sinzing
11. Tegernheim
12. Thalmassing
13. Wenzenbach
14. Wiesent
15. Zeitlarn

Verwaltungsgemeinschaften
1. Alteglofsheim; 1. Alteglofsheim^{1}; 2. Pfakofen; 2. Donaustauf; 1. Altenthann; 2. Bach an der Donau; 3. Donaustauf^{1,3}	3. Kallmünz; 1. Duggendorf; 2. Holzheim am Forst; 3. Kallmünz^{1,3}	4. Laaber; 1. Brunn; 2. Deuerling; 3. Laaber^{1,3}; 5. Pielenhofen-Wolfsegg; 1. Pielenhofen; 2. Wolfsegg^{1}	6. Sünching; 1. Aufhausen; 2. Mötzing; 3. Riekofen; 4. Sünching^{1}	7. Wörth an der Donau; 1. Brennberg; 2. Wörth an der Donau^{1,2}
^{1}seat of the Verwaltungsgemeinschaft; ^{2}town; ^{3}Markt

== Notable people ==
- Alexander Braun, Botanist
- Edith Kellnhauser (1933–2019), nursing scientist, educator, and writer
- Wolfram Menschick (1937–2010), Catholic church musician, composer and academic teacher
