= Falkenstein, Bavaria =

Falkenstein
- Municipality
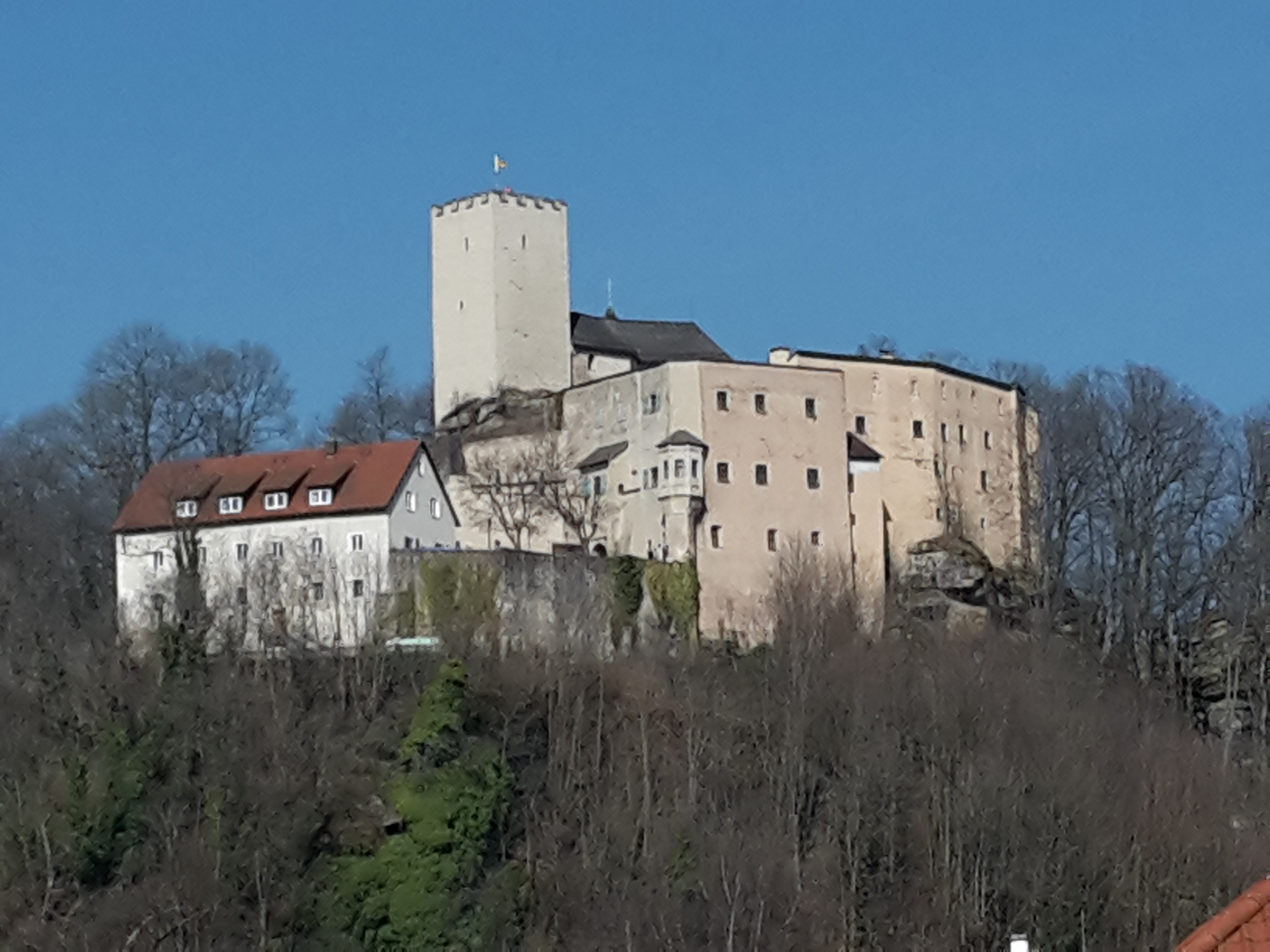
- Falkenstein Castle

- Coat of arms

- Location of Falkenstein within Cham district
- Interactive map of Falkenstein
- Location within Germany Location within Bavaria
- Coordinates: 49°05′52″N 12°29′11″E
- Country: Germany
- State: Bavaria
- Admin. region: Oberpfalz
- District: Cham
- Municipal assoc.: Falkenstein

Government
  - Mayor (2020–26): Heike Fries

Area
  - Total: 45.46 km^{2} (17.55 sq mi)
- Elevation: 573 m (1,880 ft)

Population (2025-12-31)
  - Total: 3,420
  - Density: 75.2/km^{2} (195/sq mi)
- Time zone: UTC+01:00 (CET)
  - Summer (DST): UTC+02:00 (CEST)
- Postal codes: 93167
- Dialling codes: 0 94 62
- Vehicle registration: CHA
- Website: www.markt-falkenstein.de

Falkenstein (German pronunciation: [ˈfalkn̩ˌʃtaɪn]) is a municipality in the district of Cham in Bavaria in Germany.
