= Bernhardswald =

- Municipality
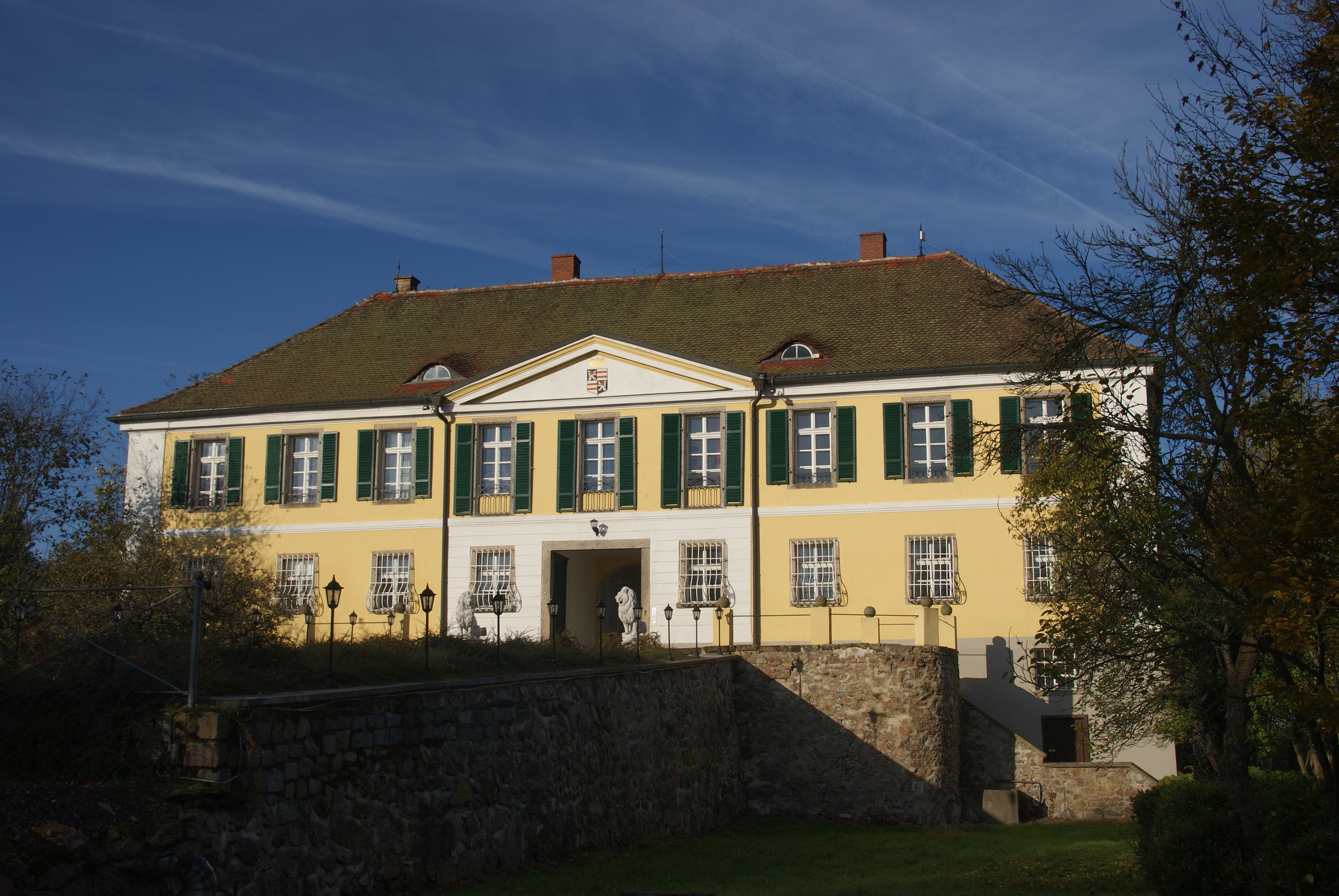
- Kürn Castle

- Coat of arms

- Location of Bernhardswald within Regensburg district
- Interactive map of Bernhardswald
- Location within Germany Location within Bavaria
- Coordinates: 49°05′26″N 12°14′40″E
- Country: Germany
- State: Bavaria
- Admin. region: Upper Palatinate
- District: Regensburg

Government
  - Mayor (2020–26): Florian Obermeier (CSU)

Area
  - Total: 71.92 km^{2} (27.77 sq mi)
- Elevation: 445 m (1,460 ft)

Population (2025-12-31)
  - Total: 5,354
  - Density: 74.44/km^{2} (192.8/sq mi)
- Time zone: UTC+01:00 (CET)
  - Summer (DST): UTC+02:00 (CEST)
- Postal codes: 93170
- Dialling codes: 09407, 09463
- Vehicle registration: R
- Website: www.bernhardswald.de

Bernhardswald is a municipality in the district of Regensburg in Bavaria in Germany.
