= Catholic University of Applied Sciences, Mainz =

Coordinates: 49°59′49.81″N 8°15′11.84″E

Catholic University of Applied Sciences Mainz
- Katholische Hochschule Mainz
- Type: Catholic
- Established: 1972
- Rector: Prof. Peter Orth
- Students: 1055
- Location: Mainz, Rhineland-Palatinate, Germany
- Campus: Mainz
- Website: www.kh-mz.de

The Catholic University of Applied Sciences Mainz (German Katholische Hochschule Mainz) is a university located in Mainz, Germany. It was founded in 1972 and is operating on behalf of the Roman Catholic Dioceses Cologne, Limburg, Mainz, Speyer and Trier.

== Notable people ==
- Edith Kellnhauser (1933–2019), nursing scientist, educator, and writer

== See also ==
- Fachhochschule
- List of colleges and universities
