= Brennberg =

- Municipality
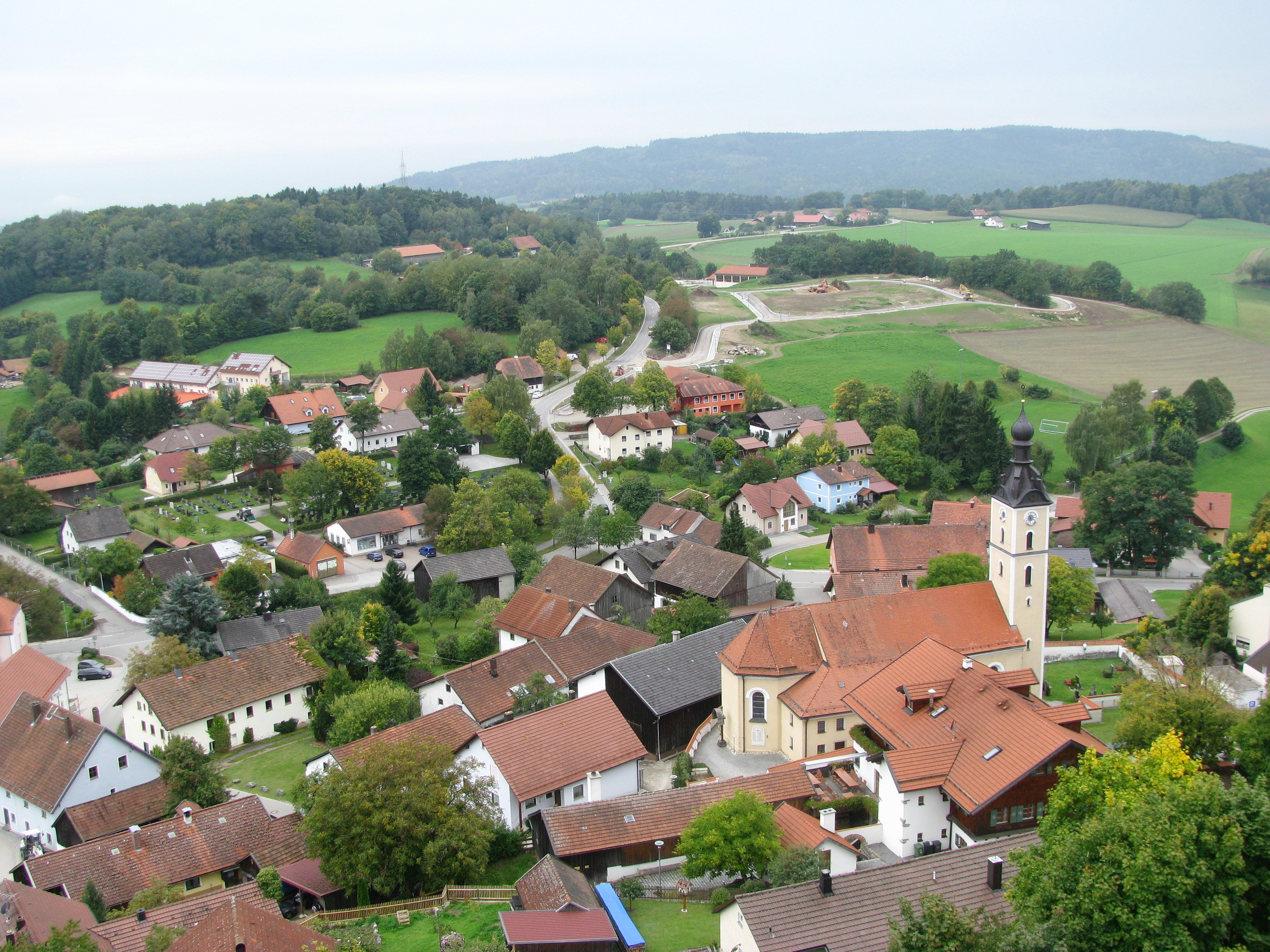
- Brennberg seen from the Brennberg Castle ruins

- Coat of arms

- Location of Brennberg within Regensburg district
- Interactive map of Brennberg
- Location within Germany Location within Bavaria
- Coordinates: 49°4′34″N 12°23′30″E
- Country: Germany
- State: Bavaria
- Admin. region: Oberpfalz
- District: Regensburg
- Municipal assoc.: Wörth an der Donau
- Subdivisions: 4 Ortsteile

Government
  - Mayor (2020–26): Irmgard Sauerer (FW)

Area
  - Total: 30.52 km^{2} (11.78 sq mi)
- Elevation: 611 m (2,005 ft)

Population (2025-12-31)
  - Total: 2,081
  - Density: 68.18/km^{2} (176.6/sq mi)
- Time zone: UTC+01:00 (CET)
  - Summer (DST): UTC+02:00 (CEST)
- Postal codes: 93179
- Dialling codes: 09484
- Vehicle registration: R
- Website: www.brennberg.de

Brennberg (German pronunciation: [ˈbʁɛnbɛʁk]) is a municipality in the district of Regensburg in Bavaria in Germany.

== People ==
- Hermann Höcherl (1912-1989), politician (CSU)
