= Liliane Juchli =

Swiss nun and writer (1933–2020)

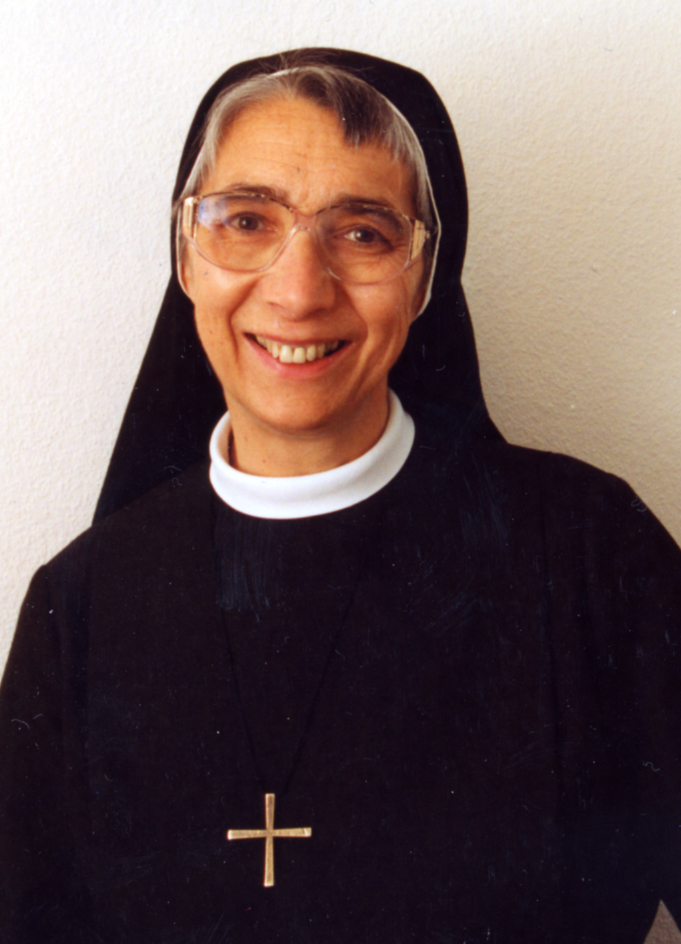
- Born: 19 October 1933; Obersiggenthal, Switzerland
- Died: 30 November 2020 (aged 87); Bern, Switzerland
- Known for: Nursing textbooks in the German-, Dutch- and Italian-speaking area Refining and extending the activities of daily living nursing model
- Honors: Order of Merit of the Federal Republic of Germany: Cross of Merit, 1st Class (2018); Decoration of Honour for Services to the Republic of Austria (2010)

Liliane Juchli (19 October 1933 – 30 November 2020) was a Swiss nurse and member of the Merciful Sisters of the Holy Cross, a Swiss congregation that followed the Franciscan tradition.

== Life ==
She was the main author of a highly influential German-language nursing textbook which was simply called "the Juchli". She was also responsible for extending Nancy Roper's activities of daily living nursing model and disseminating it in Europe. She died in 2020 of COVID-19.

== Works ==
From 1953 to 1969, she edited her own teaching papers, resulting in a 300-page textbook that was used internally at the Theodosianum Hospital and Nursing School in Zürich. She was then approached by the Thieme publishing house of Stuttgart, which resulted in the publication of Umfassende Krankenpflege. 1989 saw the 550,000th copy sold. The 6th edition (1991) was the first to contain more than 1,000 pages. For the 8th edition, the editorial responsibility was transferred to the publisher.

- 1st Edition: Juchli, Liliane (1971), Umfassende Krankenpflege [Comprehensive Nursing], Stuttgart: Kommissionsverlag Georg Thieme, p. 499, ISBN 3-13-484901-1
- 7th Edition: Juchli, Liliane; Müggler, Elisabeth; Dudli, Marie-Louise (1994), Pflege [Nursing] (7th ed.), Thieme, p. 1216, ISBN 978-3-13-500007-7
- 15th Edition: Schewior-Popp, Susanne; Sitzmann, Franz; Ullrich, Lothar (2020), Thiemes Pflege [Thieme's Nursing], Thieme, p. 1480, ISBN 978-3-13-243766-1

=== Other works ===
- Juchli, Liliane (1992), Kranke und Behinderte daheim : ein ABC für alle Betroffenen (in German) (3rd ed.), Basel: Friedrich Reinhardt, ISBN 3-7245-0576-0
- Juchli, Liliane (1993), Bilder einer Depression (2nd ed.), Kreuz-Verlag, p. 189, ISBN 3-7831-0870-5
- Juchli, Liliane (1987), Pflegen, Begleiten, Leben - Kranke und Behinderte daheim (in German) (2nd ed.), Basel: Friedrich Reinhardt, p. 253, ISBN 3-7245-0576-0

== Literature ==
- von Fellenberg-Bitzi, Trudi (2018), Liliane Juchli - ein Leben für die Pflege [Liliane Juchli - a life for nursing] (in German), Thieme, p. 221, ISBN 978-3-13-173021-3
