= Rettenbach, Upper Palatinate =

Rettenbach
- Municipality
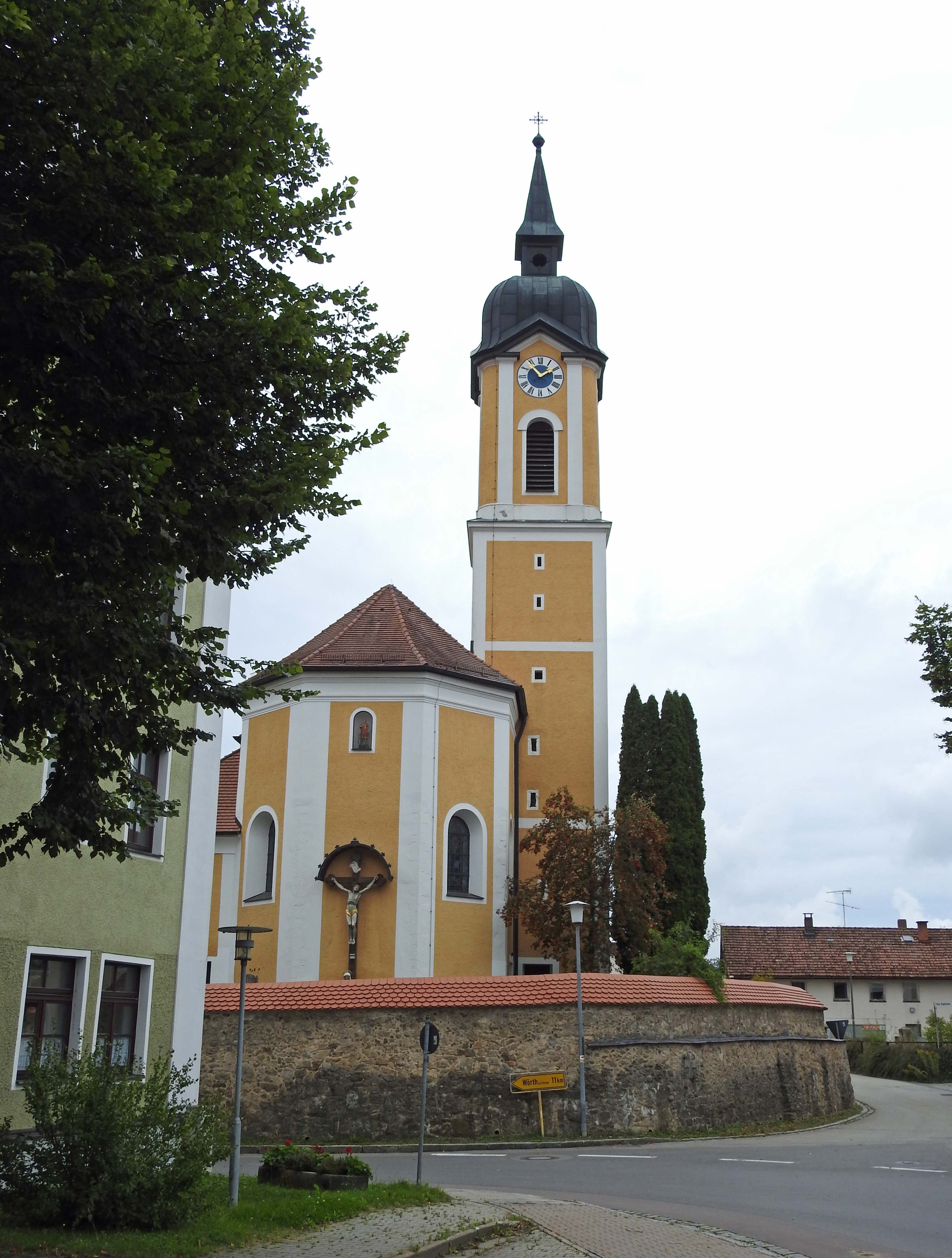
- Church of Saint Lawrence

- Coat of arms

- Location of Rettenbach within Cham district
- Interactive map of Rettenbach
- Location within Germany Location within Bavaria
- Coordinates: 49°4′13″N 12°27′24″E
- Country: Germany
- State: Bavaria
- Admin. region: Oberpfalz
- District: Cham
- Municipal assoc.: Falkenstein

Government
  - Mayor (2020–26): Alois Hamperl (CSU)

Area
  - Total: 27.11 km^{2} (10.47 sq mi)
- Elevation: 576 m (1,890 ft)

Population (2025-12-31)
  - Total: 1,814
  - Density: 66.91/km^{2} (173.3/sq mi)
- Time zone: UTC+01:00 (CET)
  - Summer (DST): UTC+02:00 (CEST)
- Postal codes: 93191
- Dialling codes: 0 94 62
- Vehicle registration: CHA
- Website: www.rettenbach.de

Rettenbach (German pronunciation: [ˈʁɛtn̩bax]) is a municipality in the district of Cham in Bavaria in Germany.
