= Wörth an der Donau =

- Town
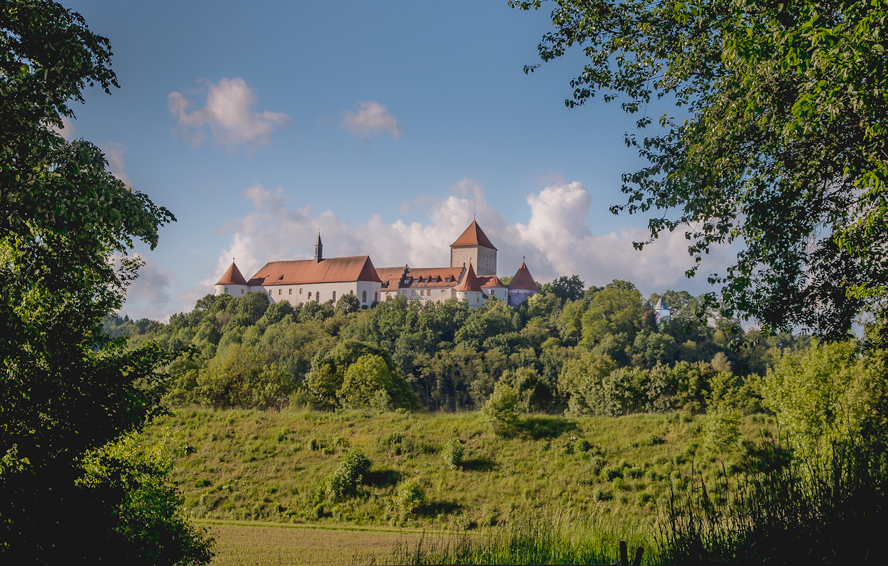
- Wörth an der Donau Castle

- Coat of arms

- Location of Wörth an der Donau within Regensburg district
- Interactive map of Wörth an der Donau
- Location within Germany Location within Bavaria
- Coordinates: 49°00′03″N 12°24′04″E
- Country: Germany
- State: Bavaria
- Admin. region: Upper Palatinate
- District: Regensburg
- Municipal assoc.: Wörth an der Donau

Government
  - Mayor (2020–26): Josef Schütz (CSU)

Area
  - Total: 52.25 km^{2} (20.17 sq mi)
- Elevation: 320–630 m (1,050–2,070 ft)

Population (2025-12-31)
  - Total: 5,301
  - Density: 101.5/km^{2} (262.8/sq mi)
- Time zone: UTC+01:00 (CET)
  - Summer (DST): UTC+02:00 (CEST)
- Postal codes: 93084–93086
- Dialling codes: 09482
- Vehicle registration: R
- Website: www.woerth-donau.de

Wörth an der Donau (German pronunciation: [ˈvœʁt ʔan deːɐ̯ ˈdoːnaʊ], lit. 'Wörth on the Danube'; officially Wörth a.d.Donau; Northern Bavarian: Wiard) is a town in the district of Regensburg, in Bavaria, Germany. It is situated on the left bank of the Danube, 22 km east of Regensburg.

== First mayors before 1945 ==
First mention of a mayor: Ulrich Vorstl (1482)

- Franz Xaver Pittinger (1803–1808)
- Schottenloher
- Vilsmeier
- Kleebauer
- Max Joseph Scheglmann (1876 to 1888)
- Oetting (1888 to 1902)
- Johann Henfling (1902 to 1930)
- Karl Saller, last freely elected mayor (1930 to 1933)
- Alfons Lehle, NSDAP (April 1933 to August 1936)
- Paul Gottschall, NSDAP (August 1936 to October 1936)
- Friedrich Horkheimer, NSDAP (October 1936 to May 1945)

== First mayor since 1945 ==
- 1945 to 1946: Alois Schmelz (introduced by US-Army)
- 1946 to 1965: Johann Baumann (ÜWG)
- 1965 to 1973: Alfred Büchele (CSU)
- 1973 to 2002: Franz Beutl (CSU)
- 2002 to 2020: Anton Rothfischer (ÜWG)
- since 2020: Josef Schütz (CSU)

Official First Mayor

Anton Rothfischer (ÜWG) was elected mayor for the first time in the 2002 election. He was reelected in 2008 and 2014. In March 2020 Josef Schütz (CSU) was elected mayor.

== Sons and daughters of the town ==
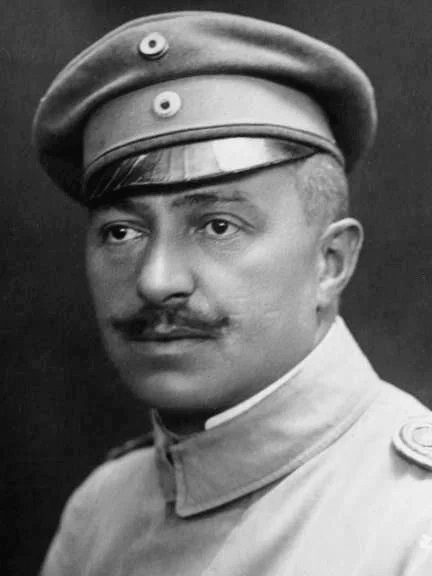
Otto Pittinger

- Otto Pittinger (1878–1926), medical councilor, politician and paramedical officer
- Johann Reichhart (1893–1972), executioner
- Ludwig Franz (1922–1990), politician (CSU) Member of Bundestag 1953–1976
- Franz Fuchs (born 1953), historian
