= Der Rosendorn =

Thirteenth-century German poem

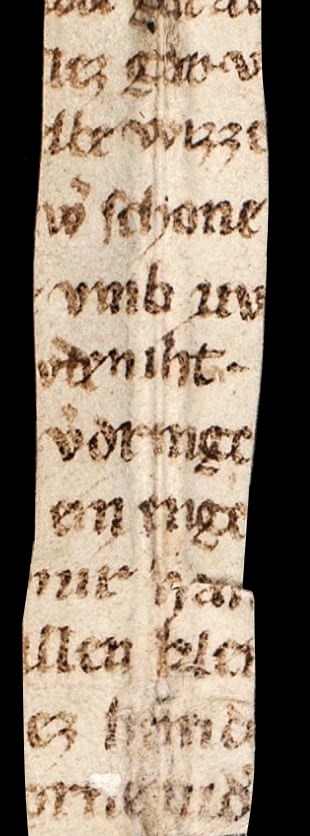
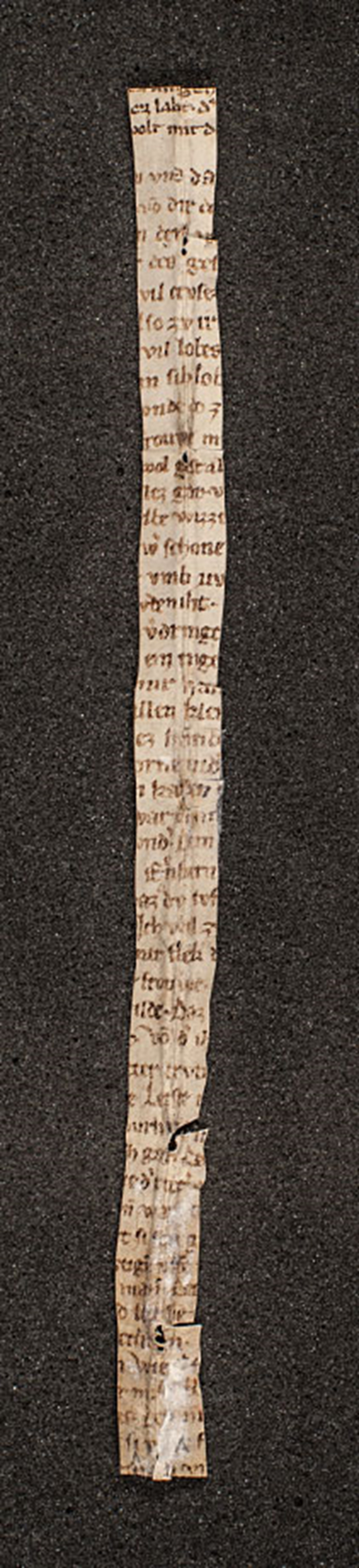

Der Rosendorn (transl. The Rose Thorn) (sometimes Der weiße Rosendorn (transl. The White Rose Thorn)) is a thirteenth-century German poem. It tells of a virgin who is separated from her speaking vulva (fud), (Note: The various terms for women's visible reproductive organs were used interchangeably in the middle ages. This, comments scholar Jane Cartwight, is because "the female body was considered to be similar to the male body in almost all respects, but with inverted genitals, almost like a wax impression of the male genitals. No mention is made of the clitoris, since this did not (it was believed) correspond to any part of the male body and no attempt is made to differentiate between the openings of the female urethra and vagina". "Swearing", notes the literary scholar Chrustine Müller, "was openly used in Medieval Literature", and the word cunt (and fuck also) "were used in their literal meanings"; it has, says Geoffrey Hughes "always been a specific term". The Latin root is cunnus.) and her dialogue with it forms the structure of the piece. They argue about what it is that men want in a woman: the woman claims that men want for herself and her beauty, whereas the cunt dismisses this, claiming that she is all men really want. The two go different directions to discover the truth; neither is successful, and both are treated badly by the men they meet. To conclude the story, the maid is physically reunited with her cunt with the assistance of a passing young man.

Originally thought to have been written in the 15th century, a portion of the text was discovered in Melk Abbey Library in Austria, as part of another book's binding; this has been dated to around 200 years earlier. Poems of this vintage were not uncommon in medieval literature, with other examples known from France, Italy or England, sexual vulgarity was a frequent theme of Geoffrey Chaucer's poetry. Der Rosendorn has been the subject of much scholarly debate over its depiction of medieval women and female sexuality to 13th-century eyes as well as its place within—and radical differences from—the broader canon of the German courtly romance.

The poem has seen as an influence on later writers such as Denis Diderot, and it has been popularly been described as a medieval version of Eve Ensler's play The Vagina Monologues.

== Background ==
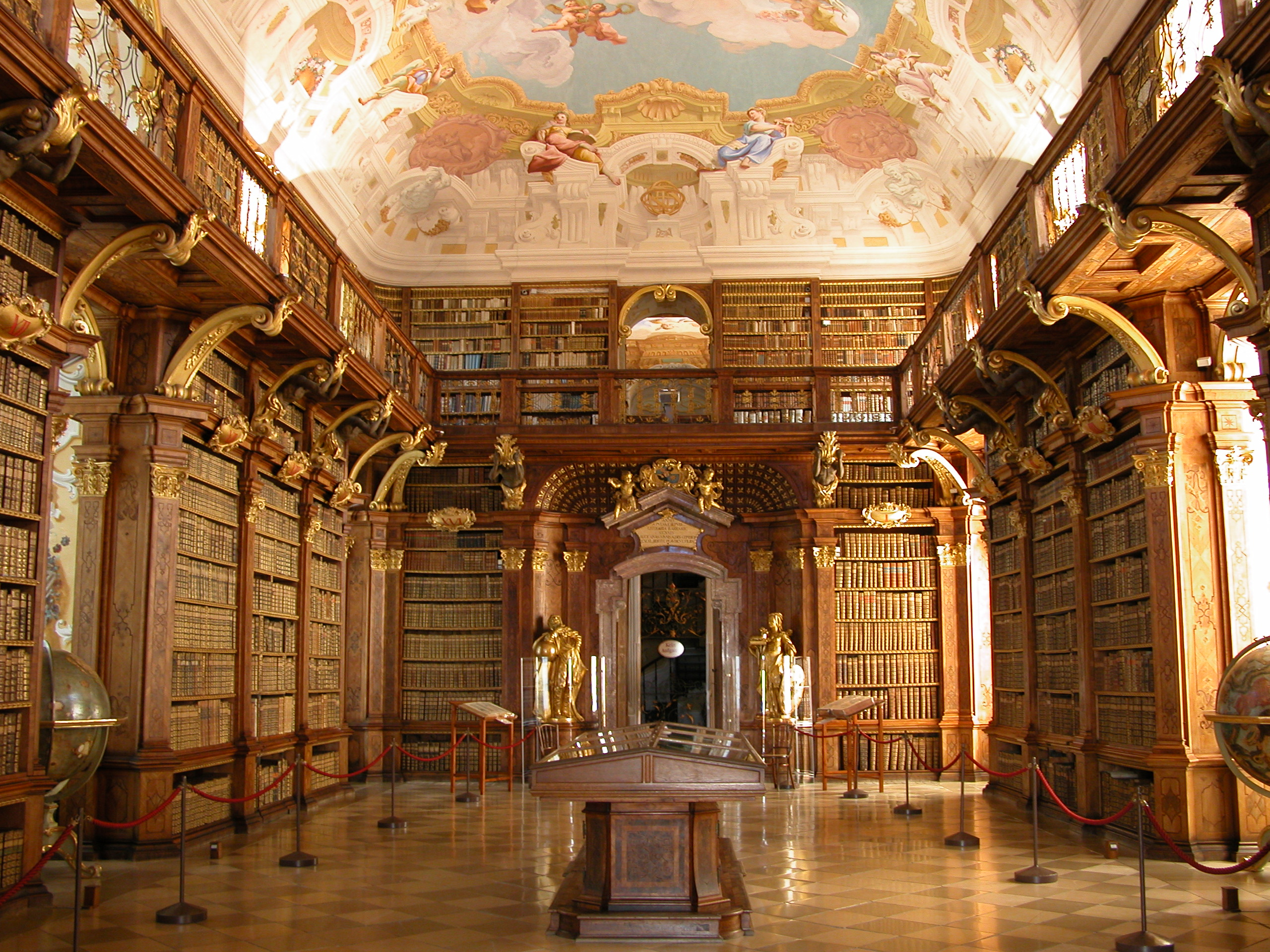
The library of Melk Abbey, where the fragment was discovered in 2019

Poems such as Der Rosendorn were uncommon but not unknown in the Middle Ages, particularly in German literature, and often-satirical writers were not afraid to use the foulest of language—mentula (cock), cunnus (cunt) and futuo (to fuck), for example—to emphasise their points. Usage words such as zers and zwetzler (German slang for cock) and fut (likewise for cunt) went much further than the usual mild terms favoured by popular literature, and, indeed, were diametrically the opposite to what would be expected in the Romantic literature of the age. The Germanist Coxon suggests that their closest relative in ribaldry would have been the Fastnachtsspiele of Carnival.

Brono Roy argues that the medieval motif of "the talking cunt" was a pan-European one, as similar fabliaux exist in French also. (Note: Roy highlights the 13th-century Du Chevalier du Fist les cons Parler, in which a chivalric knight "received from three fairies a gift: he can force a woman's sex to speak. If it does not answer his questions, the arse is supposed to answer in its place".) The scholar Jane Burns also writes that fabliaux "draw attention to the rich mythical heritage behind the medieval association of mouth and vagina". In contemporary English literature similar freedom with obscenity can be found. Chaucer, for example, frequently alluded to both male and female sex organs, often in slang, in The Canterbury Tales. For example, "The Nun's Priest's Tale" talks of the priest's "coillons" (bollocks), while in his tale, the pardoner tells the priest he can kiss his "olde breech" (underpants). In "The Miller's Tale" Absalon kisses what he hopes will be Alisoun's lips but is instead her "ers" (arse)—"nether ye"—which allows for further humour based on the hairiness of Alisoun's lips. (Note: The stanza reads: But with his mouth he kiste hir naked ers Ful savourly, er he were war of this. Abak he stirte, and thoughte it was amys, For wel he wiste a womman hath no berd. He felte a thyng al rough and long yherd. The Miller's Tale, I 3734–3738) The scholar Nichola McDonald has suggested that, while the Middle Ages as a period seems to have "accommodated ... the rude, bawdy or obscene", this did not mean that it was "devoid of the power to shock or offend".

Der Rosendorn reflected a number of popular themes of medieval German literature. Eavesdropping, for example, says Rasmussen, was "an astonishingly popular subject among a large number of late-medieval German Minnereden".

== Der Rosendorn ==
The poem begins with the male narrator going for a stroll and finding his way to a locus amoenus (Note: Oxford Reference defines a Locus amoenus as "a phrase used by modern scholars to refer to the set description of an idyllic landscape, typically containing trees and shade, a grassy meadow, running water, song‐birds, and cool breezes", originally used by Homer to describe Calypso's grotto and King Alcinous's gardens.)—or a pleasant spot—where he sees a strange thing: a fenced-off garden, with a rose bush from which the rosewater is being extracted. Every morning, while it is still dark, a young virgin—a jungfrauwe (a lady-in-waiting, in this context)—showers in the rose water that has collected. The narrator eavesdrops on the woman's argument with her cunt as to which of them provides as much pleasure to men; their conversation is both witty, sharp and free-flowing. With "narratorial licence ... pushed to its limit", the poem features an anthropomorphised vulva which has been separated from the woman, and the audience is told how "von ainer wurz fugt sich das,/Das die Fut zu ir frauen sprach" ("As a result of a herb the cunt was able to speak to her lady"). The healing herb is also described as a "manic root". The fut later explains that it ate the root; this has been interpreted as having been used as a tool of penetrative masturbation. The fut spends much of their discussion complaining: for example, that the woman would take care of every part of her body except for it. Emphasising the sexual nature of the fut's demands, it complains that she receives many presents from men, but that it never does. The discussion revolves around the question of whether men generally are more interested in the woman as a person or in her sexual being. The cunt believes that the woman need not pay too great attention to her own appearance, as it is the fut that men are interested in. Conversely, the woman argues that it is her looks which win men over in the first place. In an attempt to discover the truth, they go their separate ways. The woman meets men and offers herself, but causes a stampede and is trampled; her cunt, meanwhile, is used by every man it meets. The independent organ, suggests the philologist Ralf Schlechtweg-Jahn, is perceived as a threat by the men.

Both the woman and her cunt, apart, become deeply unhappy with their situation, which has not worked out as they thought it would for either of them, and they decide to become one again. The narrator is persuaded to help reunite the two. He does so by the "simple but brutal" method of pushing the one back into the other up against a fence, a process he indulges in gleefully, says Rasmussen. This activity he then proceeds to recommend to all men in the audience.

== Analysis ==
The authorship of the poem is unknown, including as to whether it was written by a man or a woman. The poem makes liberal use of obscene and foul language, and is intentionally provocative—with its "breaking of social and linguistic taboos"—in doing so. It is not merely the language which is radical, suggests the medievalist Anne Marie Rasmussen: its imagery, too, is "wildly fantastical, aggressive, and misogynist". Also unknown is the exact date of its production. The 15th-century editions have been known to scholars for some time, but, notes the author Jason Daley, the latest discovery "mean[s] that someone was writing about a talking vulva much earlier in the Middle Ages than previously believed". This, in turn, pushes back the date at which German literature is known to have been discussing nuances of gender and sexuality.

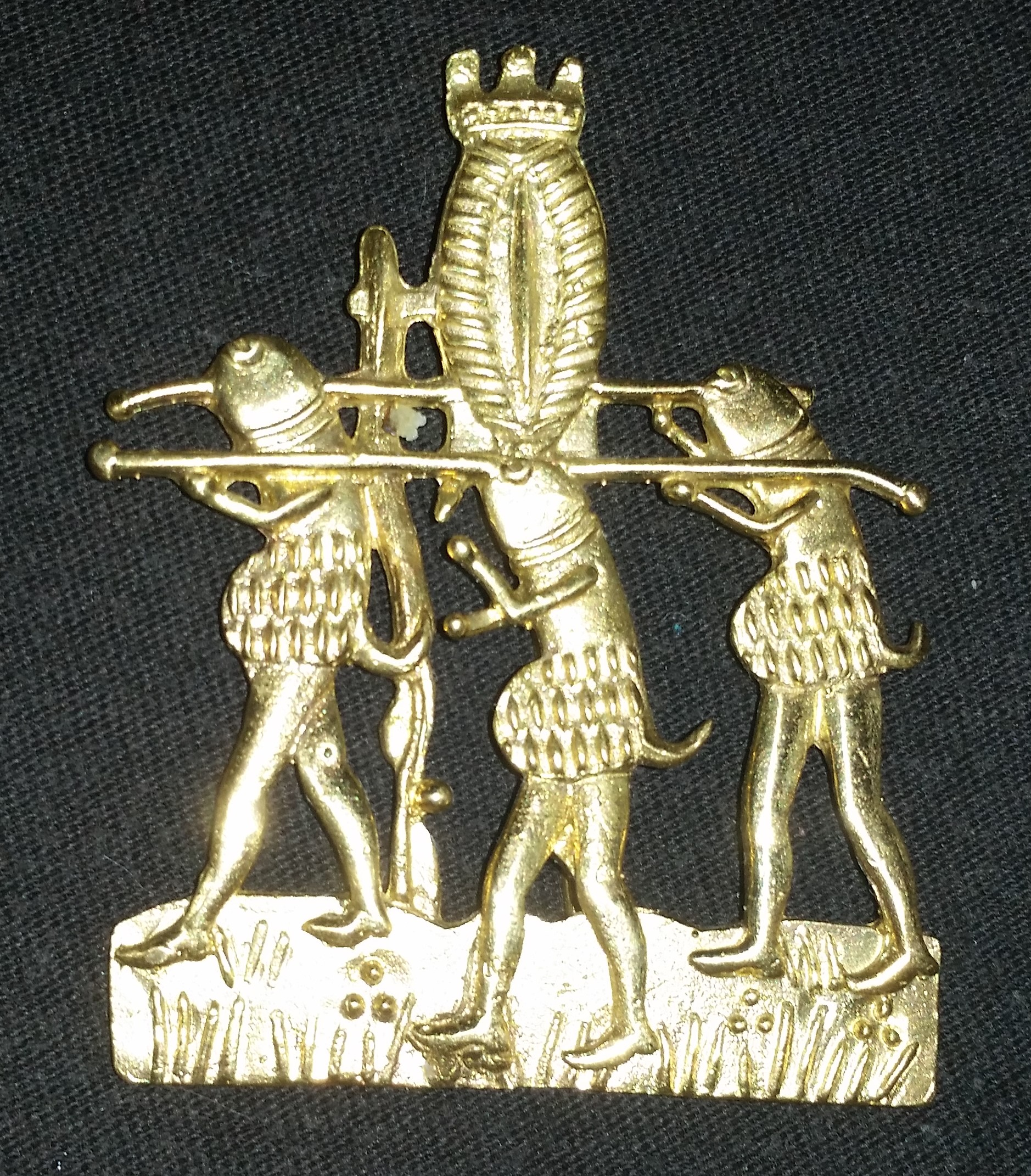
Reproduction of a 14th century brooch, found in Bruges, depicting a cunt being carried in procession by three penises.

Der Rosendorn is also unusual in having a woman as the primary protagonist; she experiences the same degree of trial and tribulation as the customary male protagonist but tailored to her specific gender. Although at first glance, suggests Coxon, it appears to be written with the appreciation of the male gaze in mind, this may not be the case. He calls the poem "comic obscenity in literary form", but also warns that it "should therefore not be presumed an exclusively male pursuit in the later Middle Ages". Coxon also suggests that, as it is known that, for example, that noble ladies were allowed—indeed, encouraged—to call up an obscene performance by the fools, "so comic tales of this ilk may have served as the basis for social interaction, entertainment and play between the sexes in certain—if not all—cultural contexts". The woman takes on certain qualities which would have been understood by contemporaries as indicating masculinity, such as the emphasis on how she is at liberty to create her own world and live by her own rules. Likewise, her masturbation with the root intimates her playing a "male role in sexuality", says Schlechtweg-Jahn. She is effectively self-sufficient in the absence of men, at least until the end says Schlectweg-Jahn, when she is forced to ask a man for assistance. The narrator, explains the poem, proceeds to "nail her cunt back into place". As a consequence of her ravishment in the rose garden—they are both deflowered, says Schlectweg-Jahn—the garden's independence from the rule of man is forever shattered, just as her virtue has been. In doing so, the woman and her body are returned to beneath the "dominating and aggressive sexual force" of masculinity. The German literary scholar Klaus Grubmüller has suggested that woman's original separation from her cunt represents a form of self-castration, while Satu Heiland has argued that the two act as representatives of sexuality and asexuality.

The poem, although very distant from the classic chivalric romances of contemporary German literature, does contain elements of the genre, particularly in its "eavesdropping male narrator", and the handmaiden in a rural and rustic sheltered setting. (Note: Such as the romances of the 12th- and 13th-century knight-poets Hartmann von Aue, Wolfram von Eschenbach and Gottfried von Strassburg) Indeed, argues Rasmussen, the main reason for introducing these elements, so familiar to contemporaries, is to reverse them and turn them inside out. The rosegarden motif is a common one in the courtly literature of the day as well as being reminiscent of Mary in the Garden of Gethsemane In the early 20th century, the folklorist Archer Taylor suggested that Der Rosendorn is related to the rose gardens of the epics—for example, in the mid-13th-century Rosengarten zu Worms and Laurin (Note: The former uses the rose garden as a place of combat and courtly adventure, while in the latter the rosegarden is attacked and destroyed, with revenge for its destruction becoming the plot's chivalric cause.)—believing that, until then, scholars had misinterpreted its meaning. At that point, only one edition—that of Friedrich Heinrich von der Hagen—had been printed, and Taylor, believed that von der Hagen had fundamentally misunderstood what he was reading: von der Hagen, said Taylor, "sought to relate the description to stories of swan-maidens". (Note: Taylor also considered that "is not necessary to discuss the extremely obscene tale with which the Rosengarten theme is combined further". Brown notes that the various rosegartën hold a multiplicity of meanings to contemporaries, being, for instance, both of "particular significance in Germanic religion" as well as being "associated with the Germanic Paradise". More recently, the scholar has noted that the symbol of the muttermal—mother—also emerged as a double rose in the late 13th-century Roman de la Rose.)

The poem also examines the theme of fidelity, although it makes no attempt to draw out a moral lesson from the story it tells—indeed, argues Coxon, it deliberately avoids doing so. This is in stark contrast to church-sponsored morality plays. It has been described as an over-the-top "erotic fantasy", "one of the first-ever erotic poems". But Glaßner argues that it is more than just a fantasy: although it may seem bizarre to modern readers, "at its core is an incredibly clever story, because of the very fact that it demonstrates that you cannot separate a person from their sex". Grubmüller also argues that the poem is illustrating the damaging consequences of any dissociation of sexuality and person.

Der Rosendorn has been described as illustrating the importance that contemporaries placed upon root medicines, particularly in connection with sexually-transmitted maladies. Der Rosendorn, argue the German medievalists Albrecht Classen and Peter Dinzelbacher is, along with Nonnenturnier and Gold und Zers, one many medieval priapeia "in which anthropomorphized genitals talk to their owners, earnestly negotiate with them, get into quarrels, separate from one another, are maltreated and sometimes come together again". (Note: The phenomenon was related, say Classen and Dinzelbacher, to the 13th- and 14th-century practice of wearing metal badges in the form of personified genitalia.) Der Rosendorn also shares, with Minnerede, elements of personification. The German linguist, D. H. Green has suggested that works such as Der Rosendorn were actually part of a " widespread reaction to romance fiction" such as Parzifal. Grubmüller describes the poem's ending as "abundantly coarse and grotesque", indicating the author's "obsessive preoccupation" with female genitalia.

=== Versions ===
Two copies of the poem were found in the Dresden and Karlsruhe Codices and were dated from around 1500.

The poem was listed as being in the possession of Erhard der Rainer zu Schambach—a member of the niederadligen, or lower nobility of Straubing, Bavaria, who left a large library—in his "book of books" of 1387. (Note: Rainer's collection was eclectic: among others, medievalist Nicole Eichenberger has listed a copy of Trista, a Psalter, a pharmacopoeia, Lives of Jesus and Mary, works by Teichner and Freidank, an interpretation of the Decalogue, a Lucidarius, and a commentary on the Parable of the Ten Virgins, and various calendars.)

The poem was edited in a collection of Old German tales in 1850, with a reprint in 1961.

=== 2019 discovery ===
In July 2019, Christine Glaßner, from the Austrian Academy of Sciences (German: Österreichische Akademie der Wissenschaften) Institute of Medieval Research, while researching the archives of Melk Abbey, discovered a strip of parchment, measuring 22 centimetres (8.7 inches) by 1.5 centimetres (0.59 inches), bearing 60 partial lines of the poem.

The parchment on which the poem was written was cut up and reused as binding (a common practice at the time) of a much later Latin theological text. Parchment, made primarily from calf and sheep skin, is essentially indestructible and was an expensive material. Based on the style of writing of the manuscript it was possible to re-date the poem to the 13th century. Der Rosendorn was nearly 200 years older than previously thought.

The text, only a few words were extant on each line, was identified and transcribed by Nathanael Busch of the University of Siegen, in collaboration with experts from the Academy and the Universities of Mainz and Marburg.

The discovery of the Melk Rosendorn fragment was considered an extraordinary stroke of luck for literary scholars. Erotic literature was known in France and Italy from the 13th century], but evidence for it in the German-speaking world was previously lacking. German erotic literature was therefore not a late bloomer, as previously assumed, but developed at the same time as in France and Italy.

The scholar of gender studies, Emma L. E. Rees, commented how, in Der Rosendorn, as in other iterations of the motif, "again, it's a man who is responsible for reuniting a woman with her wayward, talking vagina".

== Similar themes in art and literature ==
While the poem may be the German language’s earliest talking vulva, it’s not the only one in literature: the Old French fabliau from the 13th century Le Chevalier qui fesoit parler les cons et les culs employs talking vulvas.

Der Rosendorn was a probably an inspiration for Heinrich Wittenwiler's The Ring (ca. 1410), which features a conversation between a woman and her talking vulva, but without the separation between them.

In 1748 the French philosopher Denis Diderot used the motifs of Der Rosendorn and its companions in the genre, as the basis for his novel Les Bijoux Indiscrets, which revolves around a magic ring that gives vulvas (their bijoux) the power to speak.

The premise of Der Rosendorn, suggests Daley, is still a literary trope in the 20th century, for example, in the 1977 cult movie Chatterbox, was also known as Virginia the Talking Vagina. Similarly, the journalist Kate Connolly, writing in The Guardian when the newest fragment was discovered, described them as "the earliest form of The Vagina Monologues". Eve Ensler's episodic play consists of a number of personal monologues read by a diverse group of women. Topics discussed by them include consensual and nonconsensual sexual experiences, body image, genital mutilation, menstrual periods, sex work, and several other topics through the eyes of women with various ages, races, sexualities, and other differences. The journalist Christobel Hastings has also related Der Rosendorn with Ensler's play, calling the former an example of how "long before The Vagina Monologues came into being ... there was plenty of exploration into the complexities of female sexuality in the literary canon". (Note: Hastings considers the poem to abrogate the perception that medieval women were "meek, submissive, and permanently drifting around in long robes with pendant sleeves". Rather, she argues, Der Rosendorn "proves, women are, and have always been, playful, assertive, and in complete control of their sexual destiny".)
