= Franz Schneider =

Franz Schneider may refer to:

- Franz Schneider (engineer), Swiss engineer and aircraft designer
- Franz Schneider (chemist) (1812–1897), Austrian physician and chemist
- Franz Schneider (composer) (1737–1812), Austrian composer and organist
- Franz Schneider (spy), courier for the Soviet Red Orchestra
