= Teichner =

Teichner is a surname. Notable people with the surname include:

- Felix Teichner (born 1991), German politician (AfD)
- Gabi Teichner (born 1945), Israeli basketballplayer
- Martha Teichner (pronounced [ˈtaɪʃnɚ] TAISH-ner, born 1948), American television news correspondent
- Peter Teichner (born 1963), German mathematician
