= The knight who could make cunts speak =

French comic folk tale

"The knight who could make cunts speak" (Old French: "Le Chevalier qui fist parler les cons") is an Old French fabliau by Garin. The tale recounts a knight who, low on money, leaves his citadel for a tournament out of town. But on his way, he is granted three magical abilities by three beautiful maidens that will help him on his quest for fortune.

Seven versions of it remain, including one in MS Harley 2253 (a manuscript ca. 1340 which also contains the Harley Lyrics).

== Synopsis ==
The story begins with a successful knight who had to pawn all of his knightly possessions after war had ended and tournaments were banned. With no land and only a squire at his side, he resolved to live in a luxurious provincial chateau. Eventually, news comes of a tournament in which the knight could participate. Rejoiced, he tells his squire who reminds him that the knight had pawned away all his gear. The knight asks his squire to re-purchase the gear by any means he can. the squire ends up selling the knight's palfrey, leaving them with enough to buy back all the gear and a small amount of spare change. Then the knight and his squire depart for the tournament on horseback, when they stumble upon a lush forest where three preternaturally beautiful maidens were bathing, their luxuriously gold-embroidered clothes hanging from a tree branch. The squire, who was ahead of the knight, quickly snatches the clothes and rides on. The maidens began to weep when the knight comes across them. The eldest maiden tells him of their plight, and so the knight finds his squire and confronts him. He takes back the clothing, and when the knight restores the clothing and the maidens dress themselves, they give him three gifts. The first maiden says from now on, anyone you meet will seek to please you and give up any possessions you need from them. The second maiden gives him the power to hear vaginas speak if he addresses them. The third adds to that power: if a vagina is prevented from speaking, the anus will respond for it. (Note: Bloch uses Anatole de Montaiglon, Recueil général et complet des fabliaux des XIIIe et XIVe sieles (Paris, 1872).)

The knight initially thinks the maidens have either gone mad or are just mocking him. He catches up with his squire and heads back on his way, when a priest comes riding in on a mare. The priest tells them he would love to have them keep his company as guests. Bewildered by the priest's hospitality, the knight takes advice from his squire to approach the mare's vagina and ask it where the priest is headed. To his surprise, the vagina tells him the priest is headed off to give money to a concubine. The priest, fearing sorcery, throws off his cape and belt (which contains his purse of heavy coinage) so he can flee as fast as he can. The knight picks up the money purse and cape, riding onward with the mare.

They approach a citadel, warmly greeted by a Count and Countess. After being treated to dinner, sleeping arrangements are made for the knight and squire. The Countess tells her handmaiden to sleep naked with the knight and serve his needs, and that she would do it herself if her husband wasn't around. The handmaiden obeys the request, and awakes the knight by slipping into his bed. However, when she tells the knight her reason for being there he remains skeptical. The knight asks her vagina for the answer, and even though it corroborates her story, the handmaiden runs off to her bedroom in fright at the sight of it speaking. The maiden informed the Countess on the matter, and in the morning as the knight and squire were preparing their departure, the Countess insisted they stay for a midday meal. In front of everyone at the feast, the Countess reveals her knowledge of the knight's unique ability and proposes to him a wager. The Countess bet that he would not be able to make her vagina talk. If the knight wins, she pays him handsomely; but if she wins, he gives up his horse and gear. The knight agrees, but before his attempt the Countess makes a trip to her room to stuff a wad of cotton into her vagina. When she returns, the knight asks her vagina what she did in her room, but it wouldn't speak. He asks it three times to no avail, but his squire reminds him of what the third maiden of the forest said. When he asks her butthole why the vagina isn't talking, it reveals that she stuffed a cotton wad in it. The Count demands she go remove the wad if such is the case, and after a brief leave she returns unhappily. The knight then asks the vagina why it couldn't speak, and it confirms it was jammed with cotton. The whole room erupts in laughter, and she pays the knight as promised. The knight goes on to live in prestige throughout the earth.

== Editions ==
There are seven manuscripts containing the fabliau, six French and one in Anglo-Norman (the latter in MS Harley 2253):

- A. Paris, Bibliothèque nationale de France, français, 837, f. 148va-149vb
- B. Bern, Burgerbibliothek, 354, f. 169ra-174rb
- C. Berlin, Staatsbibliothek und Preussischer Kulturbesitz, Hamilton 257, f. 7vb-10vb
- D. Paris, Bibliothèque nationale de France, français, 19152, f. 58ra-60rc
- E. Paris, Bibliothèque nationale de France, français, 1593, f. 211rb-215ra | ccviii-ccxii | 208rb-212ra
- I. Paris, Bibliothèque nationale de France, français, 25545, f. 77va-82vb
- M. London, British Library, Harley, 2253, f. 122vb-124va

The author is named as simply "Garin", and it is recorded in the Nouveau Recueil Complet des Fabliaux that because this was such a common name, and there is nothing else to go on, this is insufficient to identify who that was.

MS ABCDE are a single common version. MS I diverges from MS ABCDE in its description of the welcome of the knight to the castle, which it devotes an extra 50 lines to, the banquet, with a detailed description of the food, and the girl who is offered to the knight, Blancheflor.

MS M, in contrast, cuts out all of the courtly allusions. The two suggested explanations of this are Rychner's that it was reproduced from memory, and John Hines's that allusion to French courtly literature was omitted for the benefit of an English audience.

Joseph Bédier Bowdlerized the title, as he did others in his edition of the Fabliaux, to Du Chevalier qui fist parler les dames ("make the ladies talk").

== See also ==
- Der Rosendorn, a 13th-century German epic poem about a virgin who argues with, is separated from, and subsequently reunited with, her own vagina.

== Influences ==
Denis Diderot's novel with talking vaginas, Les Bijoux Indiscrets, was inspired by this fabliau.
