= Melk Abbey =

- Stift Melk (German)
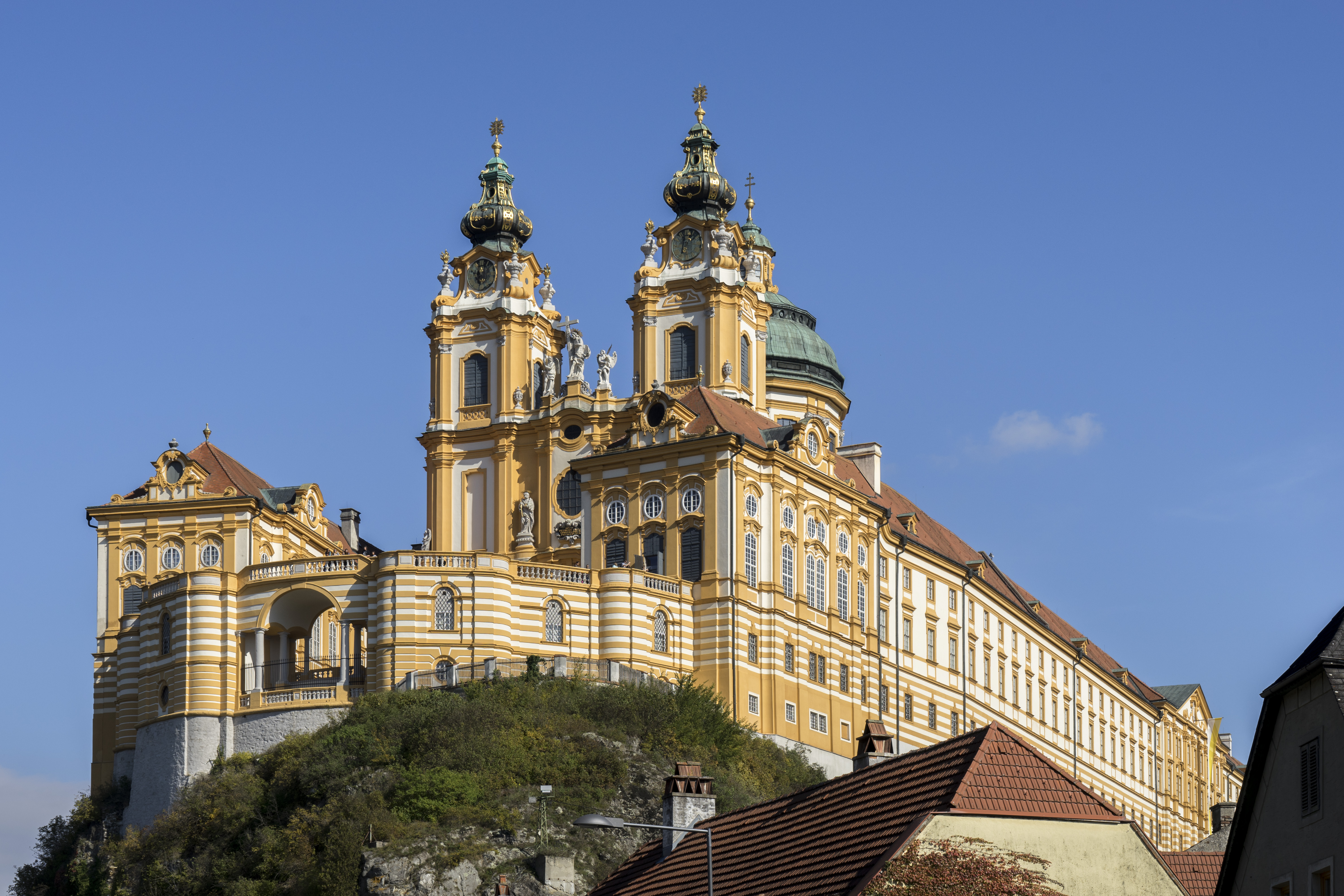
- Melk Abbey

- Location of Melk Abbey in Austria
- 48°13′41″N 15°20′02″E
- Location: Austria

Site notes
- Area: Europe
- Architect: Jakob Prandtauer
- Architectural style: Baroque

Melk Abbey (German: Stift Melk) is a Benedictine abbey above the town of Melk, Lower Austria, on a rocky outcrop overlooking the Danube river, adjoining the Wachau valley, that belongs to the Austrian Congregation. The abbey contains the tomb of Saint Coloman of Stockerau and the remains of several members of the House of Babenberg, Austria's first ruling dynasty.

== History ==
The abbey was founded in 1089 when Leopold II, Margrave of Austria gave one of his castles to Benedictine monks from Lambach Abbey. A monastic school, a forerunner of the Stiftsgymnasium Melk, was founded in the twelfth century, and the monastic library soon became renowned for its extensive manuscript collection and production, many of them contain musical compositions. In the fifteenth century the abbey became the centre of the Melk Reform movement which reinvigorated the monastic life of Austria and Southern Germany.

Today's Baroque abbey was built between 1702 and 1736 to designs by Jakob Prandtauer. Particularly noteworthy are the abbey church with frescos by Johann Michael Rottmayr and Paul Troger. In the later eighteenth century, Abbey of Melk became a center of Enlightenment thought and social exchange; there was even a Masonic lodge there, since a number of monks were Freemasons.

Due to its fame and academic stature, the Benedictine monastery Melk managed to escape dissolution under Emperor Joseph II when many other Austrian abbeys were seized and dissolved between 1780 and 1790. Today the Danube between Linz and Vienna is renowned for the numerous medieval and modern buildings along the river banks. The abbey also survived threats to its existence during the Napoleonic Wars and in the period following the Anschluss in 1938, when the school and a large part of the abbey were confiscated by the state. The school was returned to the abbey after the Second World War and now serves nearly 900 pupils of both sexes.

Since 1625 the abbey has been a member of the Austrian Congregation, now within the Benedictine Confederation.

In his novel The Name of the Rose, Umberto Eco named one of the medieval protagonists "Adso of Melk" as a tribute to the famous abbey. Melk Abbey is also the metaphorical climax ("a peak in a mountain range of discovery") of Patrick Leigh Fermor's autobiographical account of his walking tour across Europe in A Time of Gifts.

The abbey is part of Wachau Cultural Landscape, a World Heritage Site.

== Restoration efforts ==
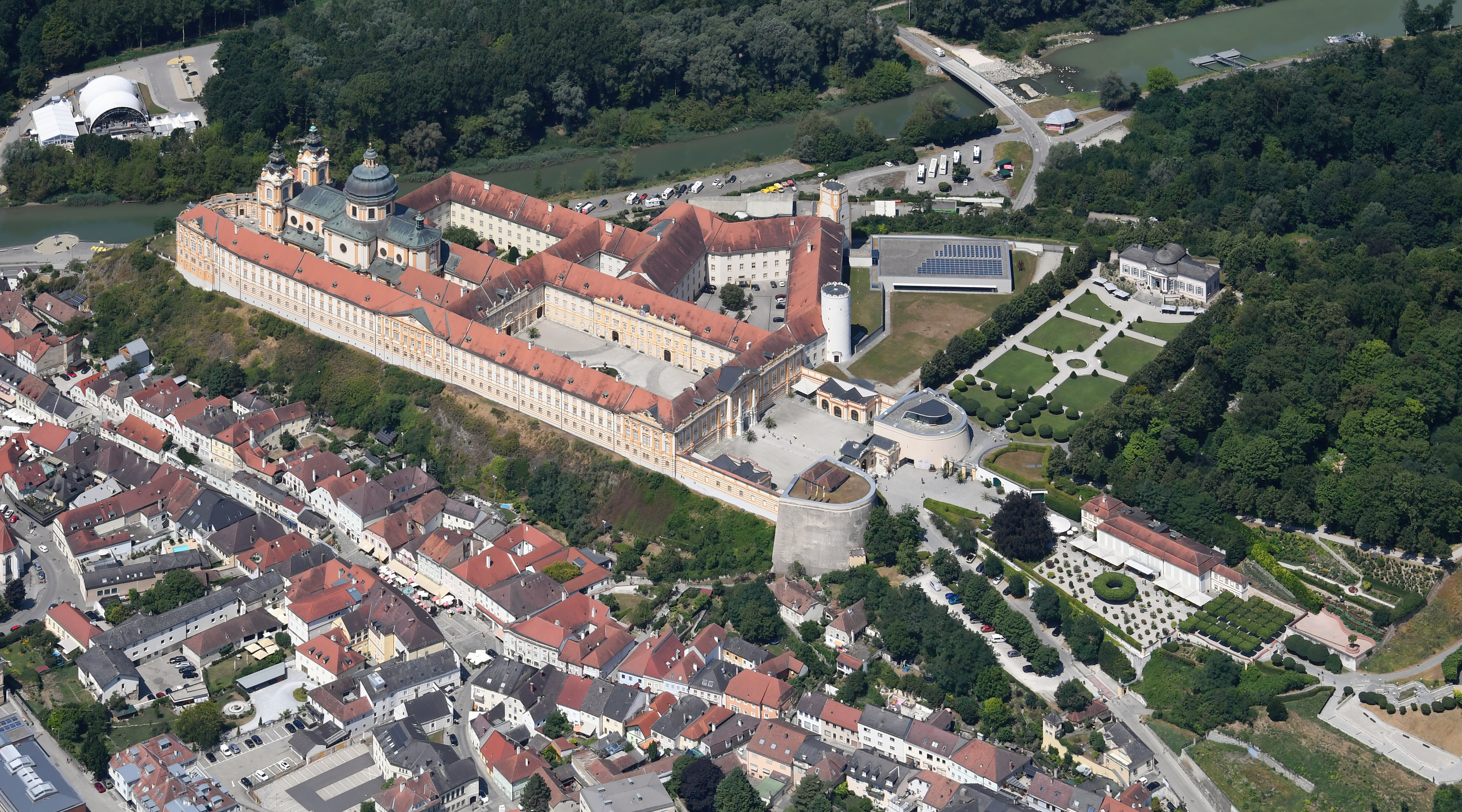
Aerial view of the Melk Abbey and its park

The first fire at Melk Abbey and its invaluable library was in 1297. This left the structures destroyed. Most of the manuscripts Melk is famous for housing were saved by monks. During the 1683 Turkish invasion, the Melk Abbey also suffered severe damages.

The abbey that stands today, built in 1702, caught fire in 1974. This fire marred the ornamented rooms and damaged the interior and its art, leading to its restoration from 1978 to 1995. The nave of the abbey was a part of the restoration. Eight pounds of gold bullion were used to restore the statues and altars. The Marble Hall, a popular guest attraction, was also restored during this period.

== Library ==
The library (Deutsch: Stiftsbibliothek Melk) has many rare medieval manuscripts, as well as a large inventory of Baroque literature.

In July 2019, Christine Glaßner, from the Austrian Academy of Sciences' Institute of Medieval Research, while researching the abbey's archives, discovered a previously unknown strip of parchment containing 60 partial lines of the poem Der Rosendorn, or The Rose Thorn, which commentators called the first Vagina Monologues. The parchment, which had been subsequently recycled into the binding of a much later book, has been dated to around 1300; this is nearly 200 years earlier than it was previously thought to have been written.

== Euro commemorative coin ==
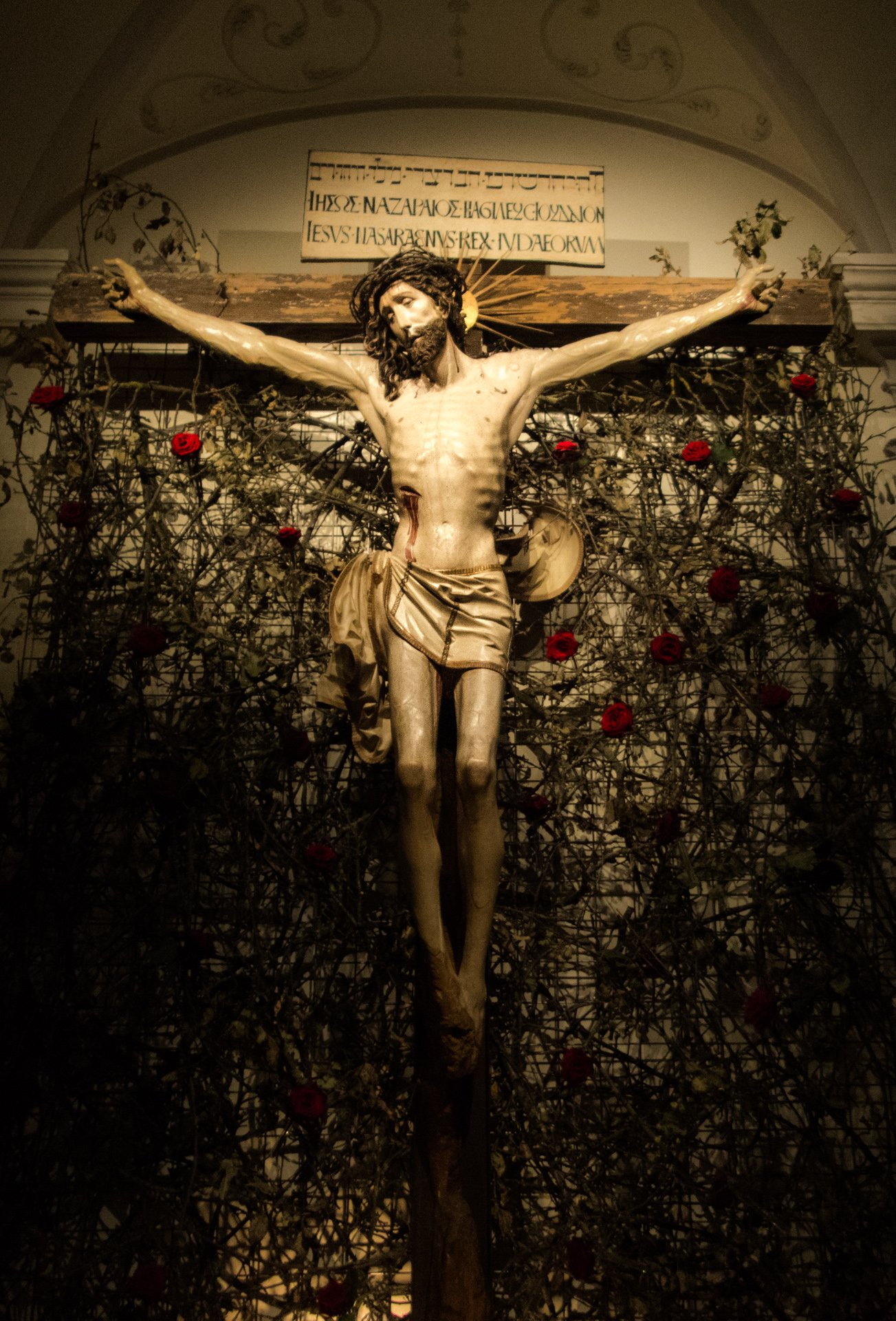
Jesus of Nazareth on the Cross, Stift Melk

Melk Abbey was selected as the main motif of a 10 euro collectors' coin: the Austrian Melk Abbey commemorative coin, minted on April 18, 2007. The obverse shows a view up to the façade of the abbey church and its two side wings from a low level. The twin baroque towers and the great dome of the church behind them can be seen. In the lower right corner the coat-of-arms of the Abbey of Melk (the crossed keys of St. Peter) can be seen.

== Notable people ==
- Johann Georg Albrechtsberger, organist at the abbey from 1759 through 1766
- Franz Schneider, organist at the abbey from 1766 through 1812.

== Gallery ==
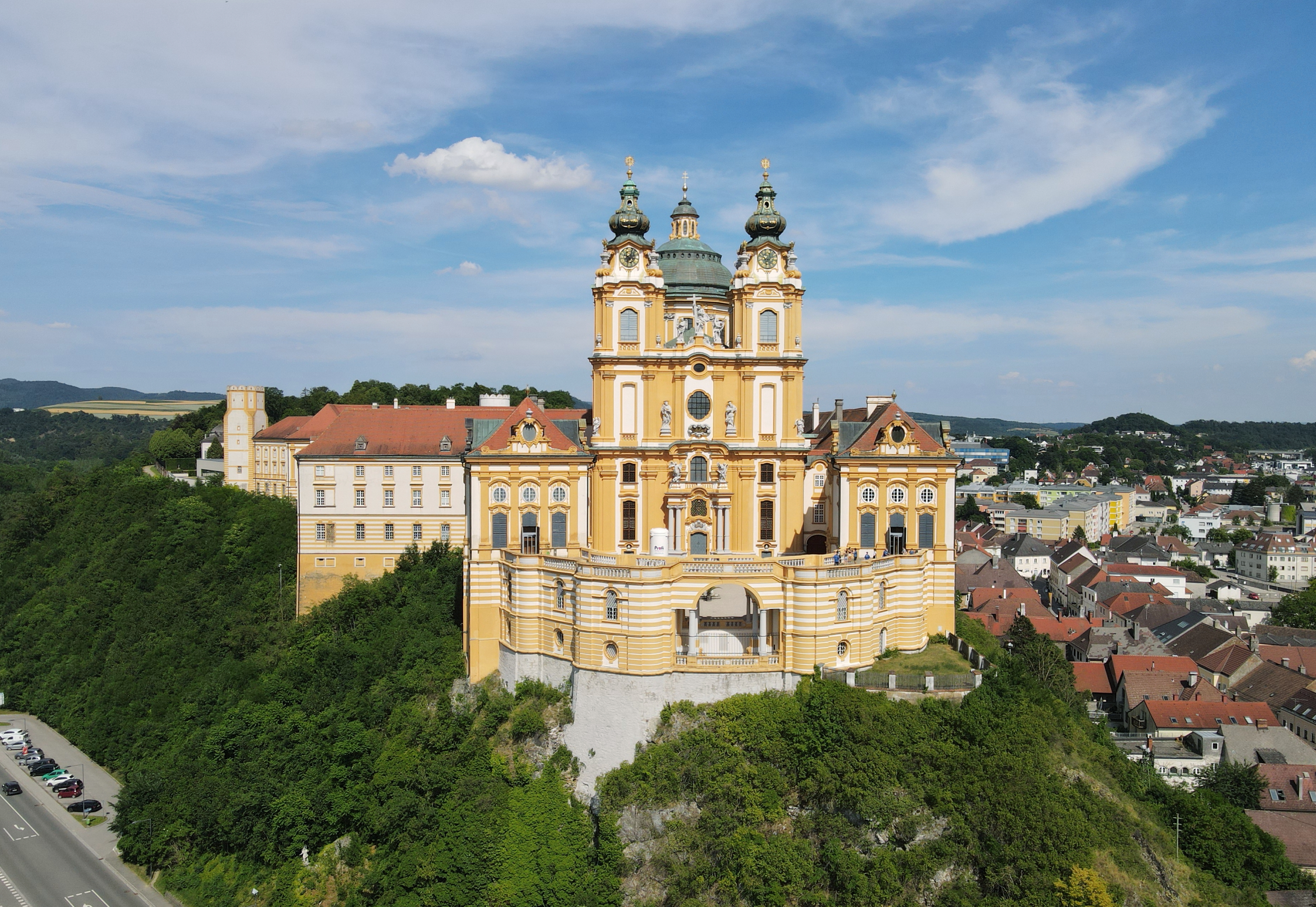
West view of Melk Abbey

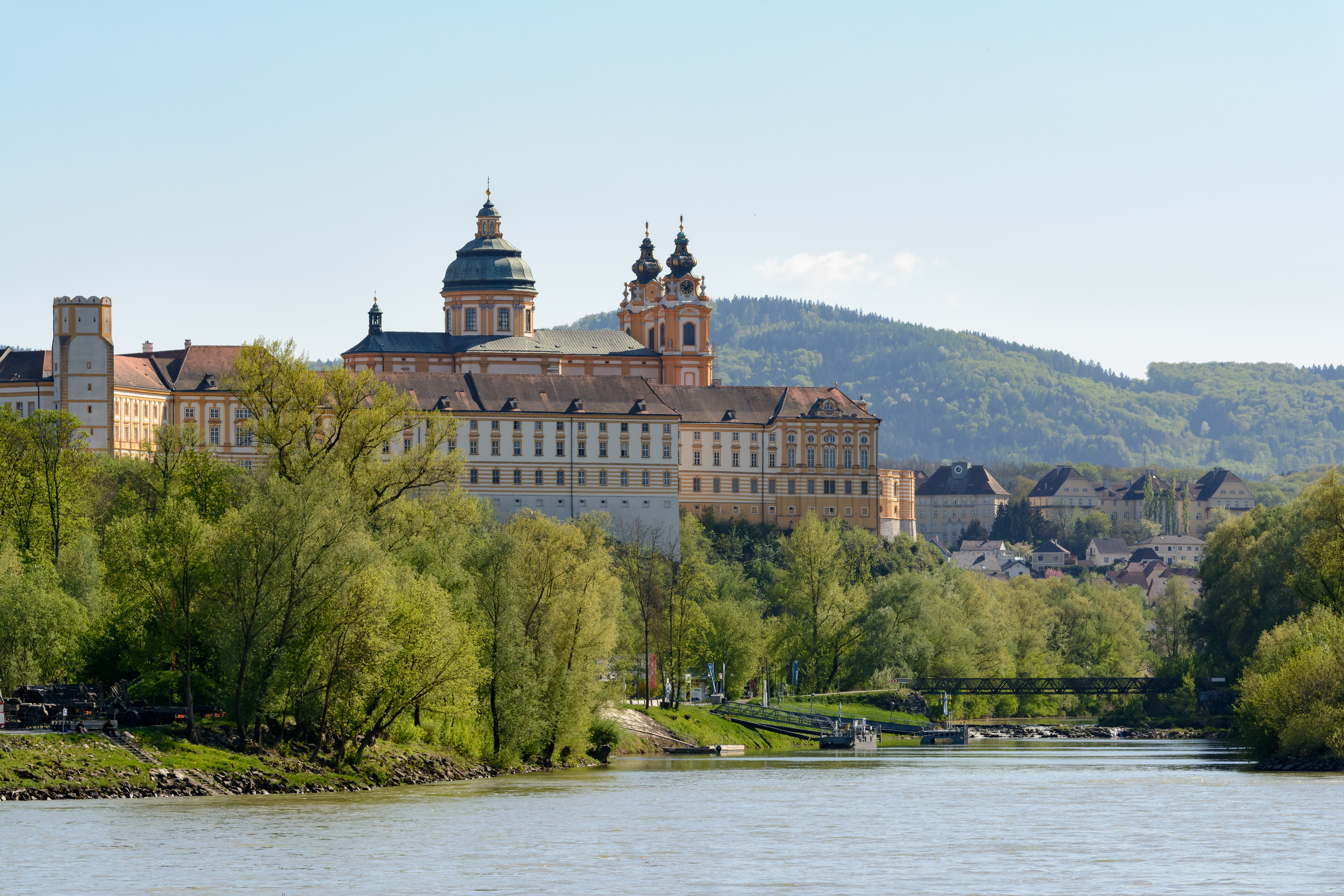
North side of Melk Abbey and entry of Melk river into the Danube

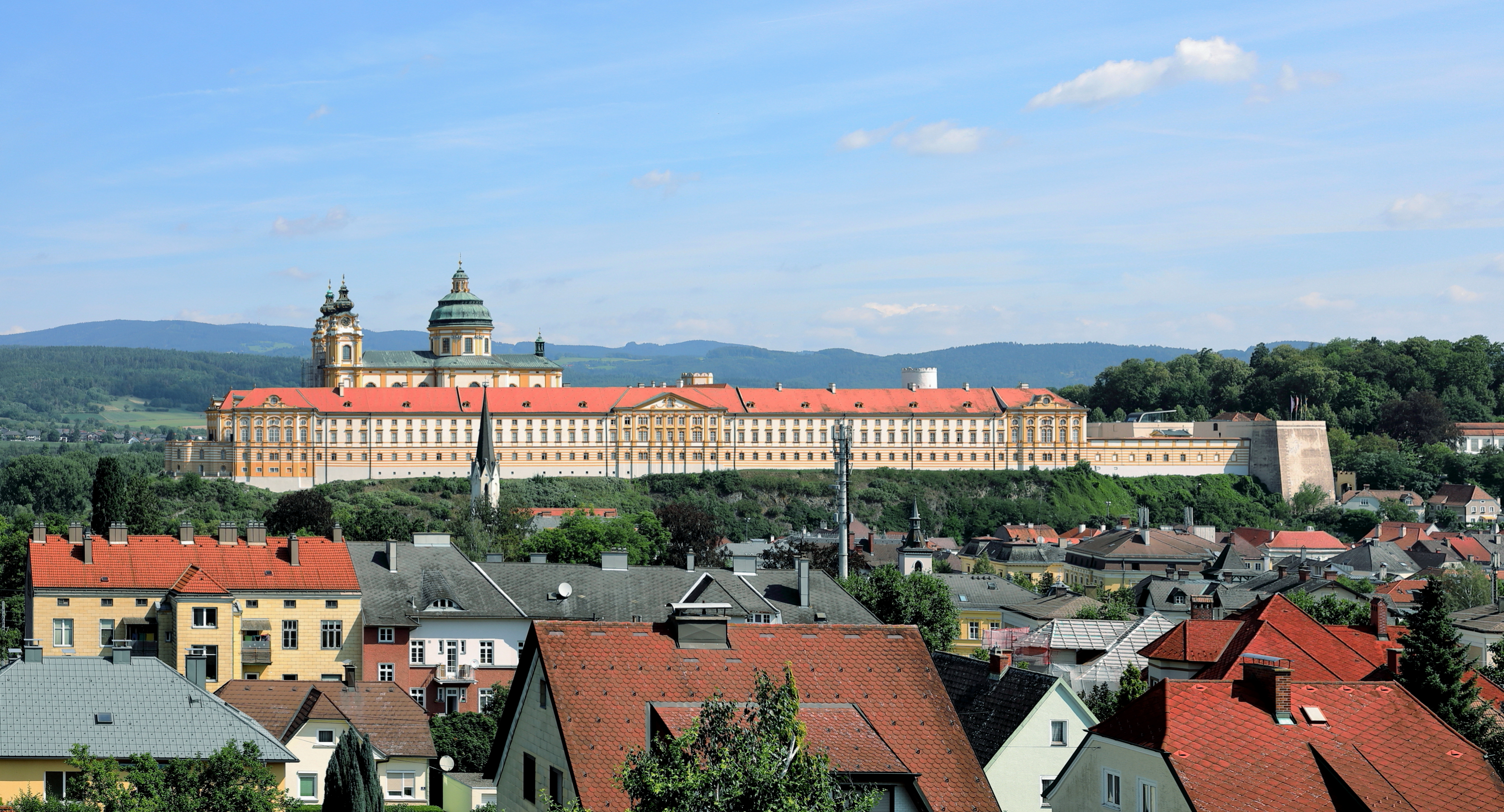
View from the south

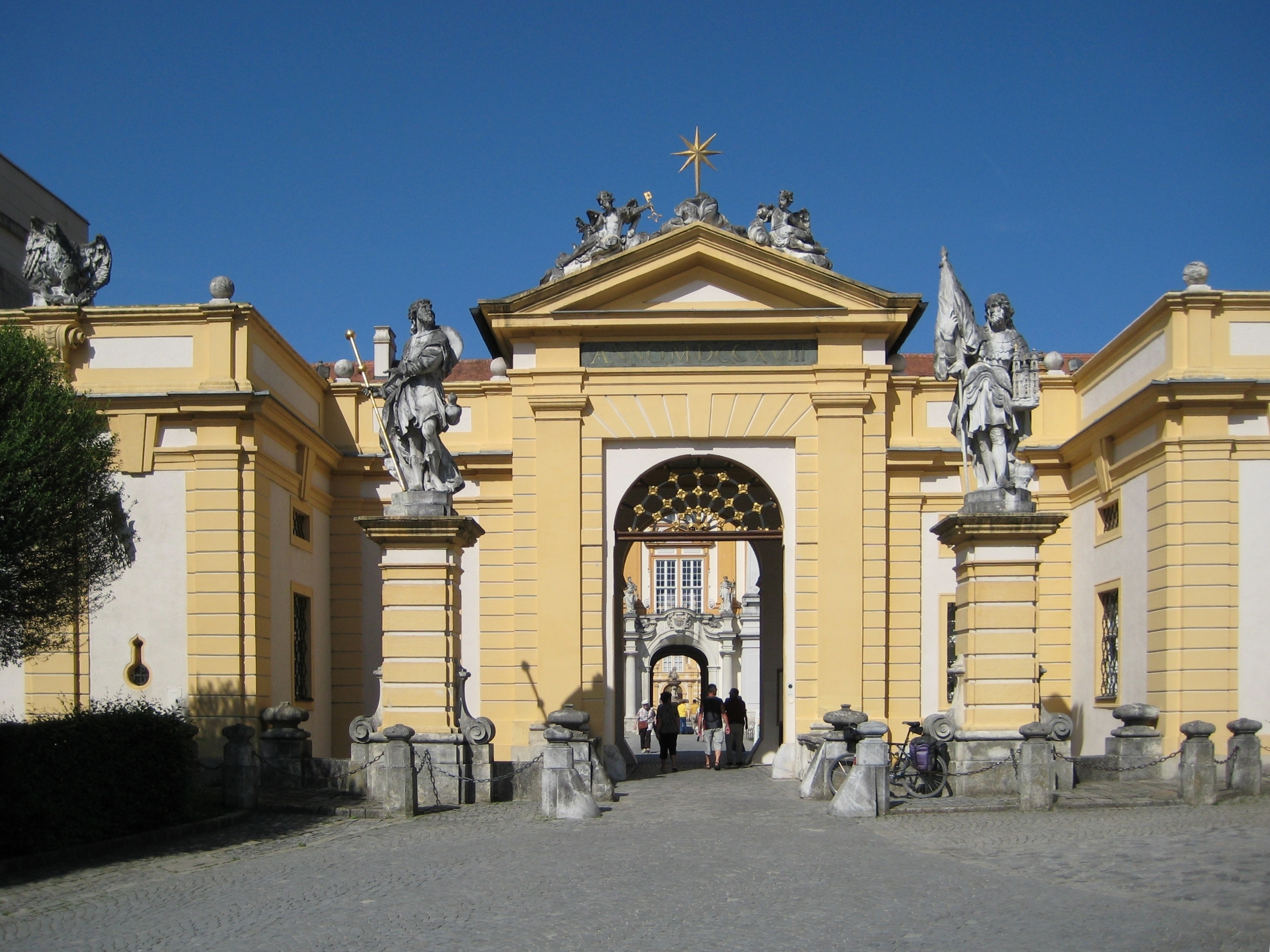
Main entrance (2007)

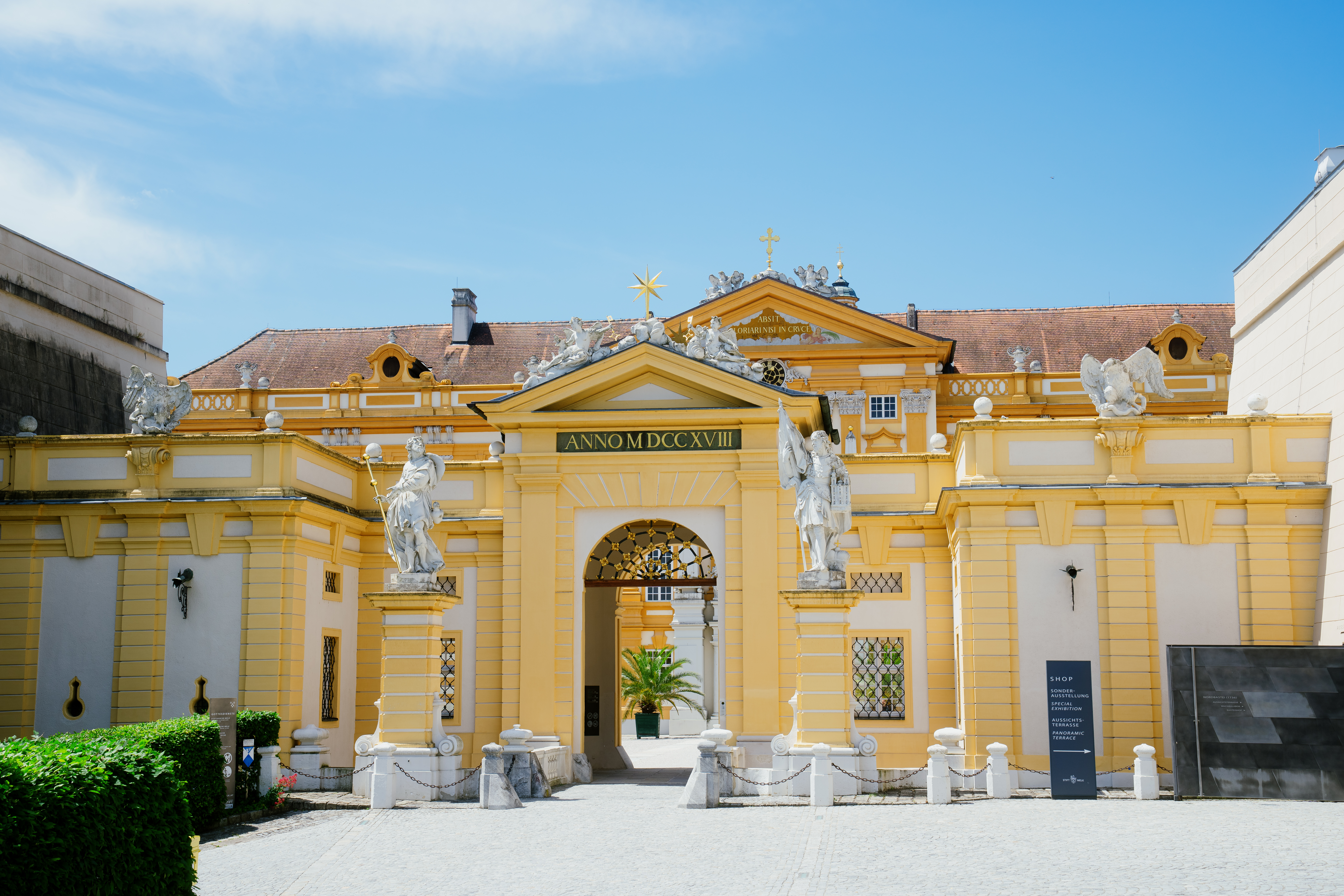
Main entrance (2023)

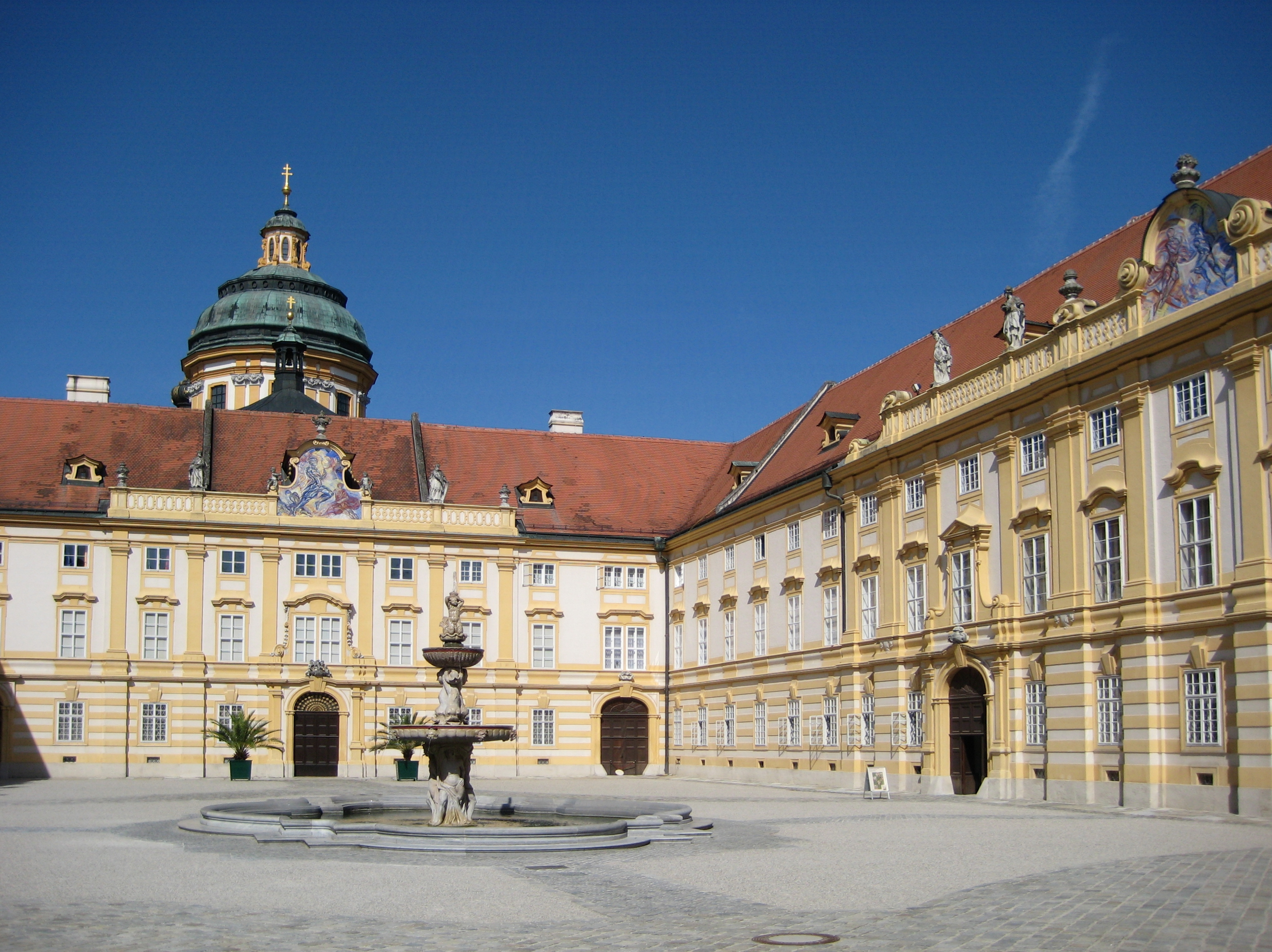
Prelate's courtyard

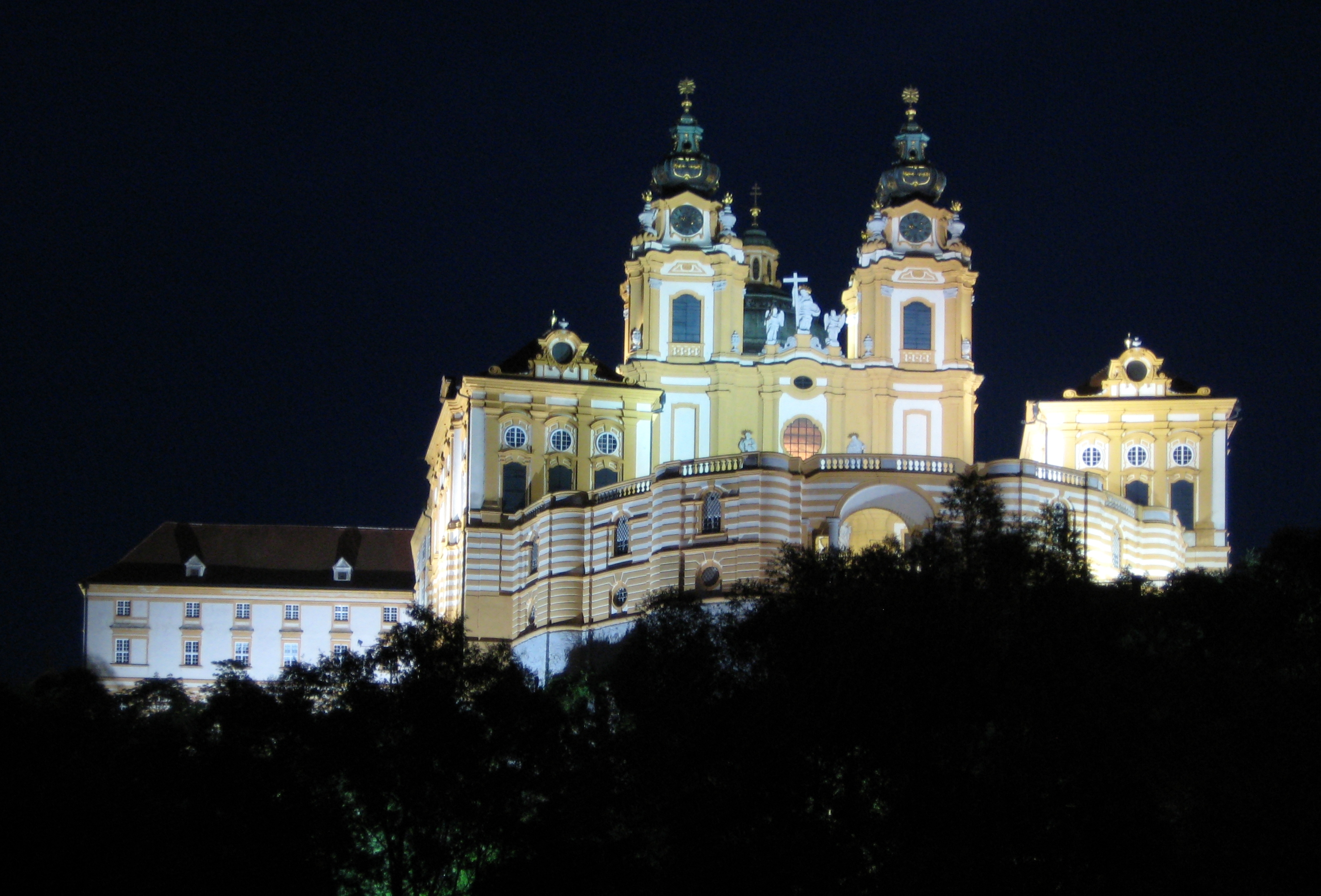
Melk Abbey at night

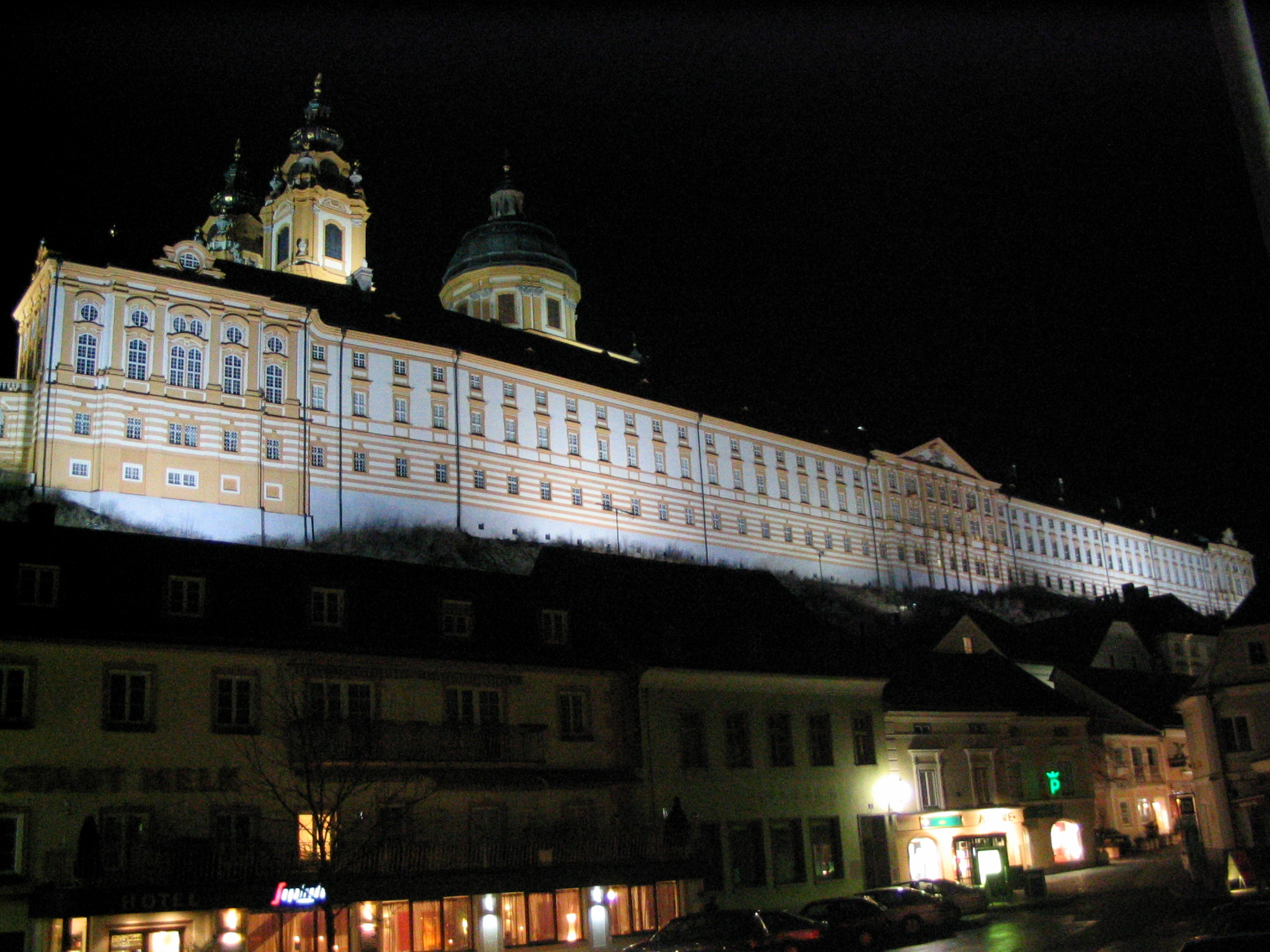
Melk Abbey at night from the old town

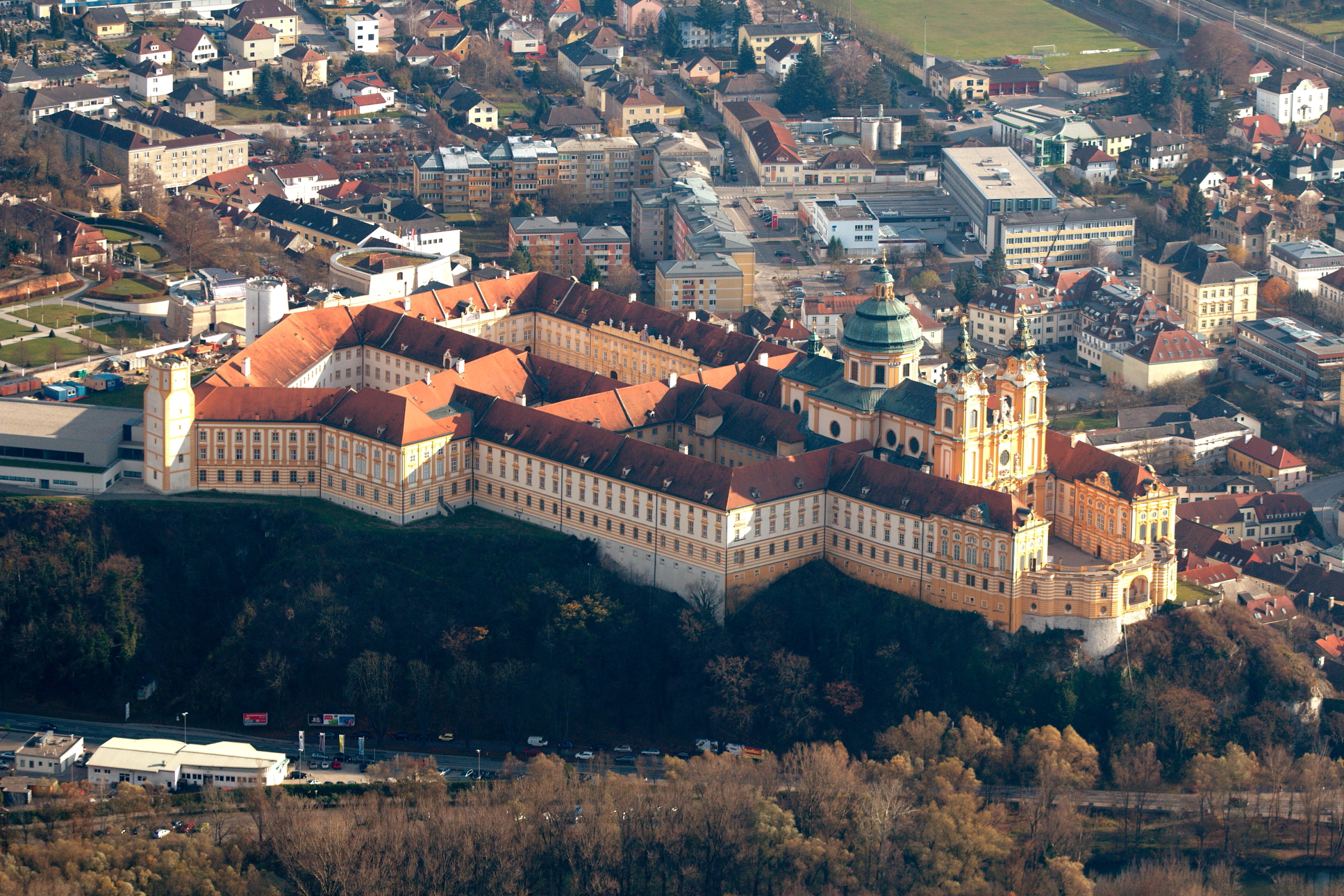
Aerial view

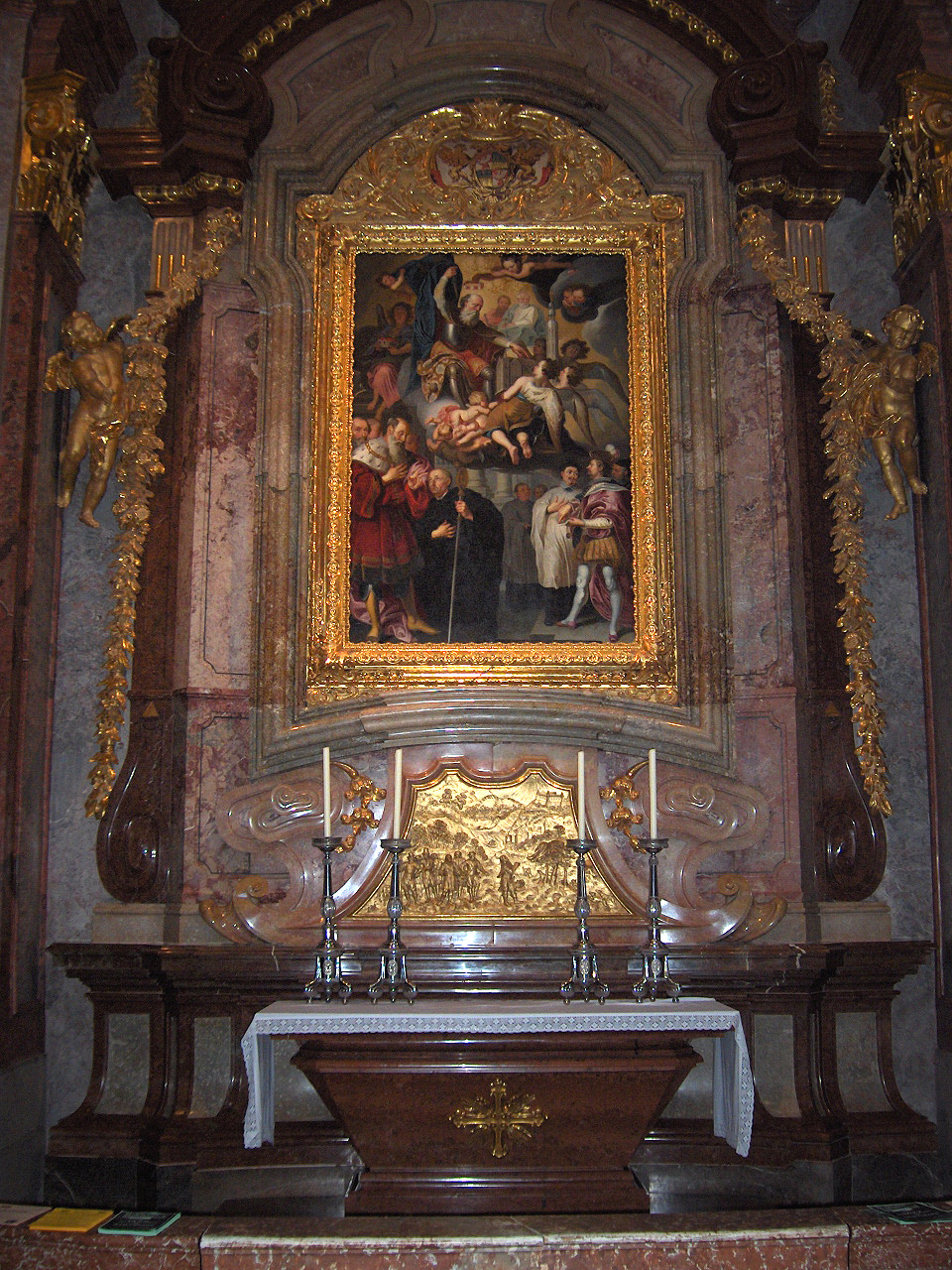
Leopold Altar, painting by Georg Bachman (1650)

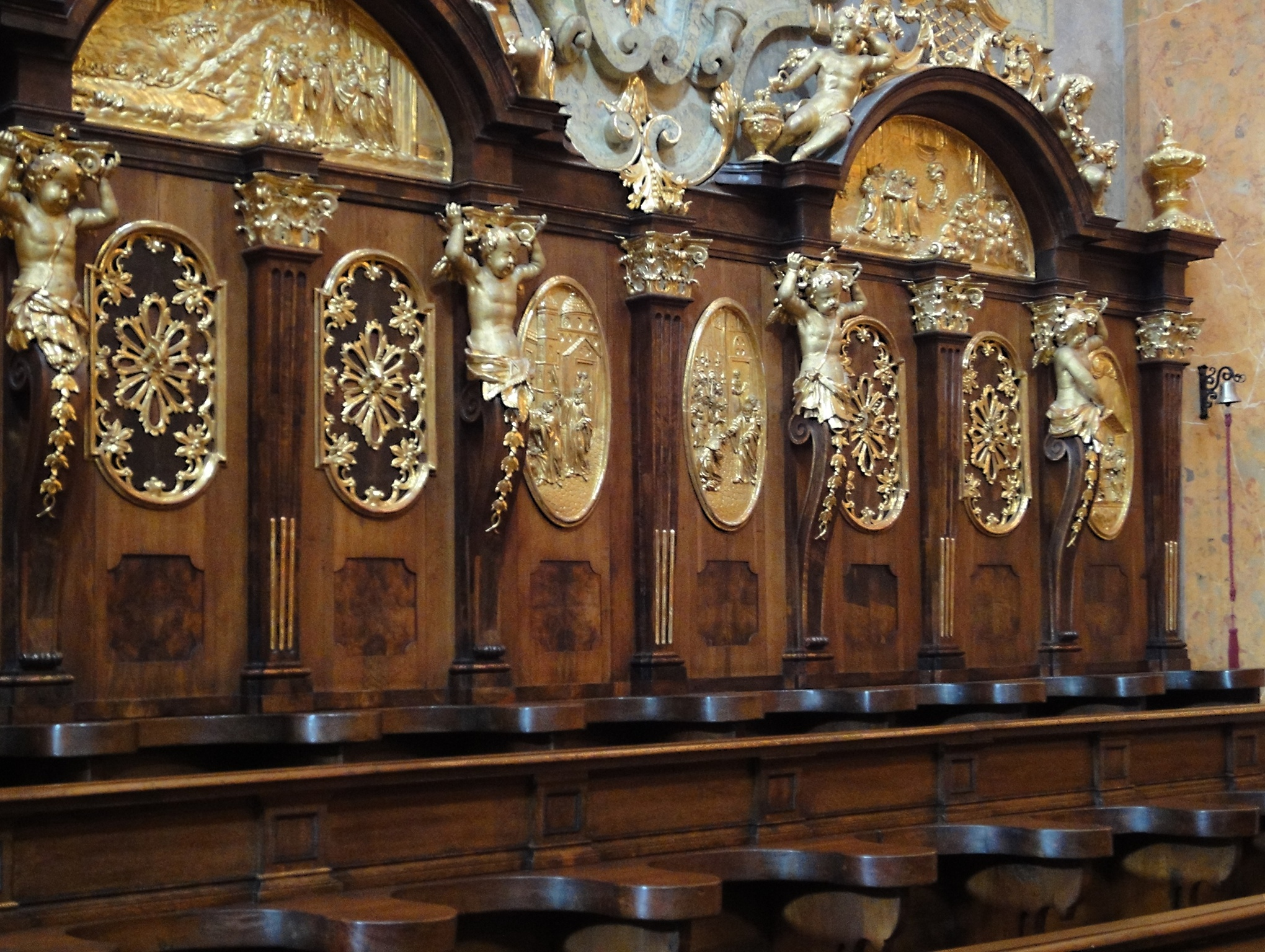
Choir stalls

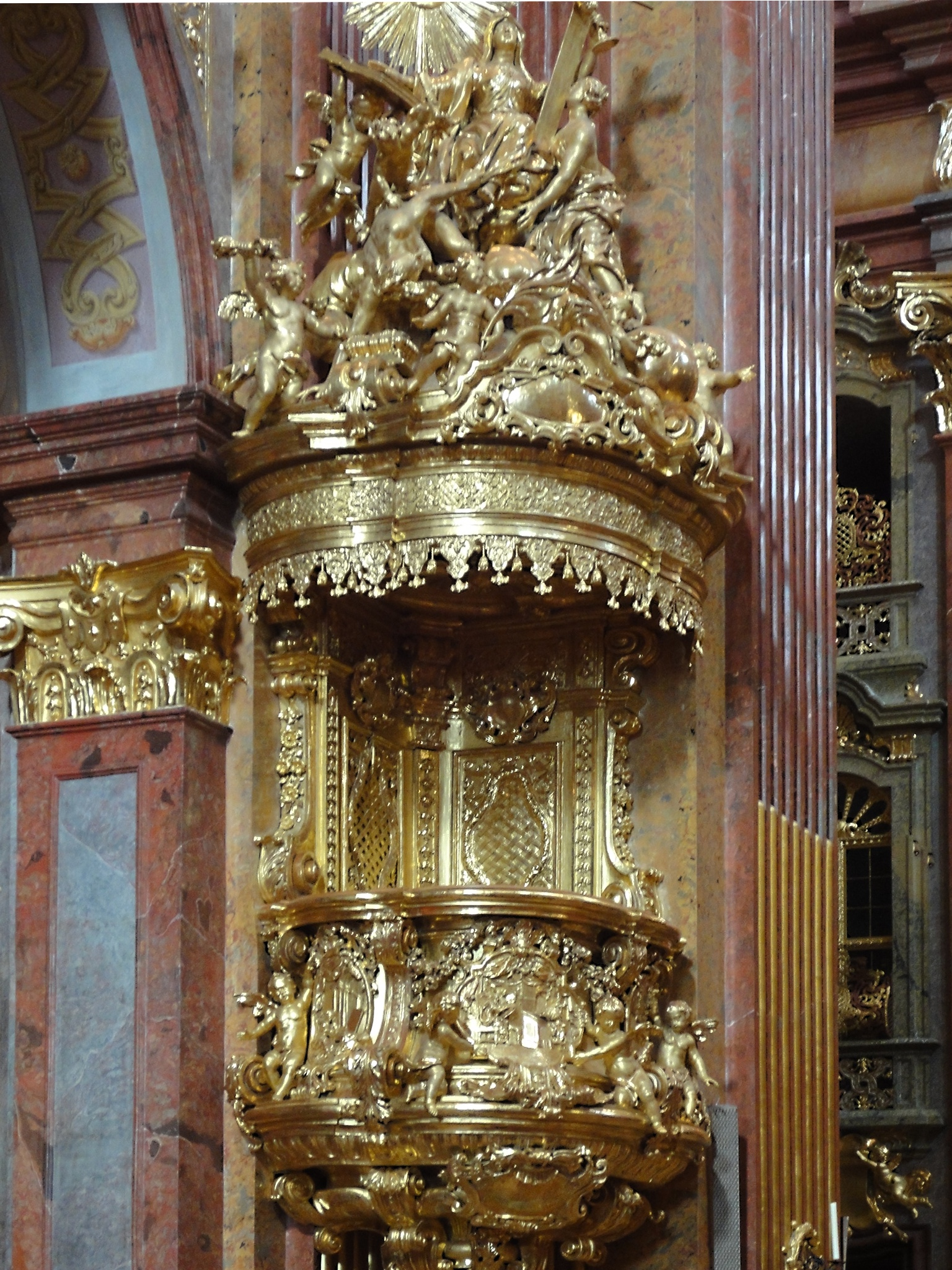
Pulpit

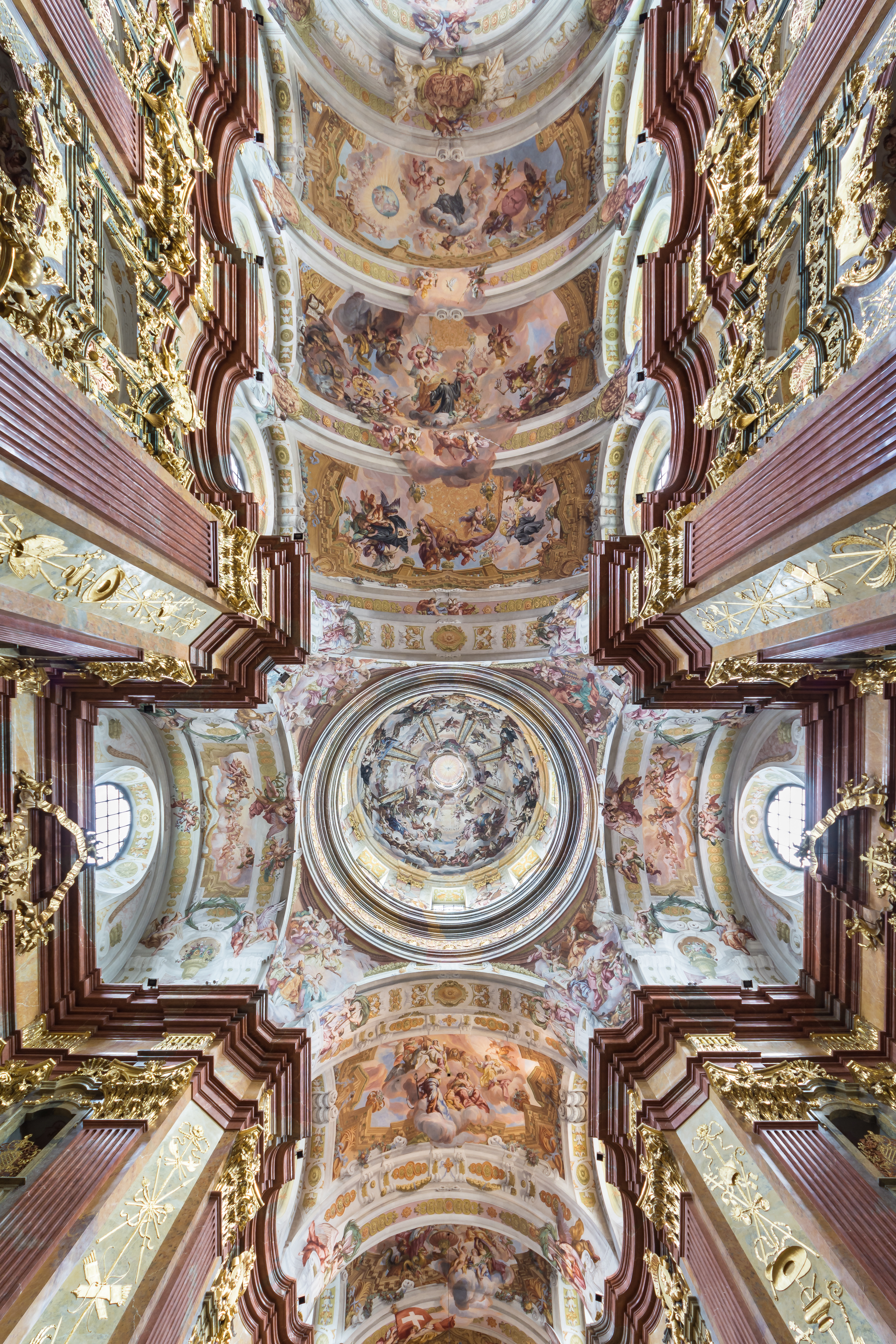
The ceiling

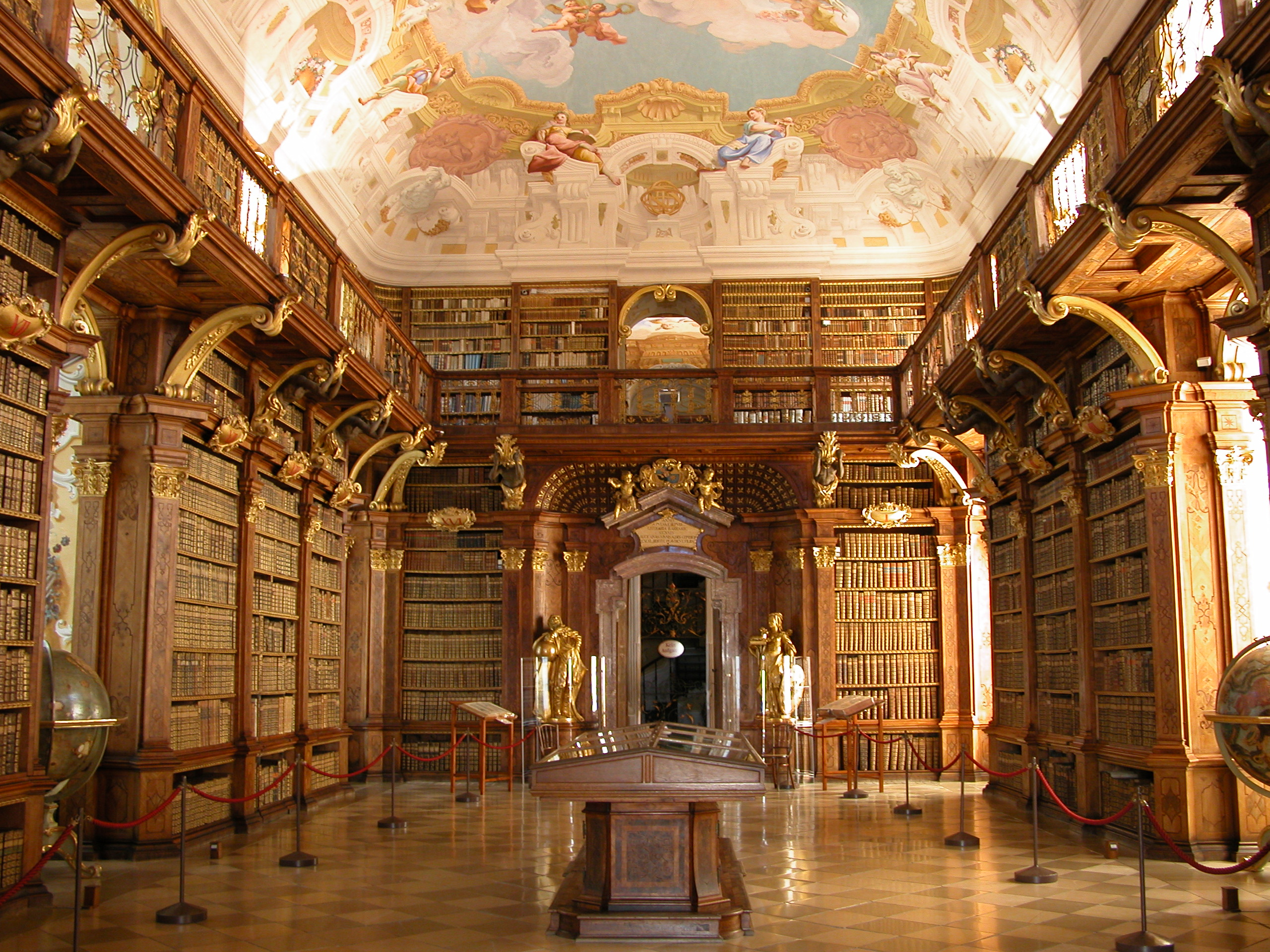
Melk Abbey Library

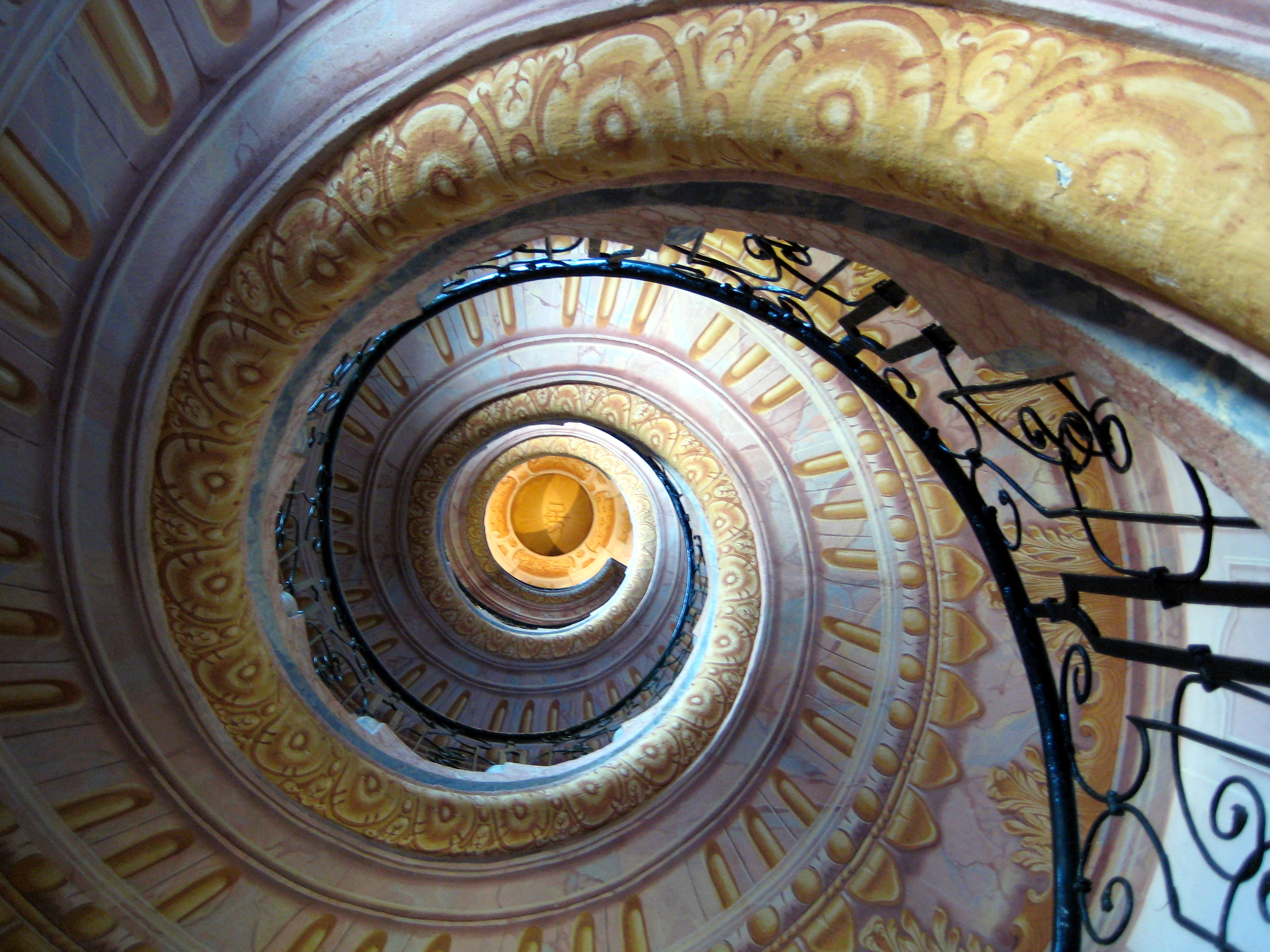
Staircase between the library and church

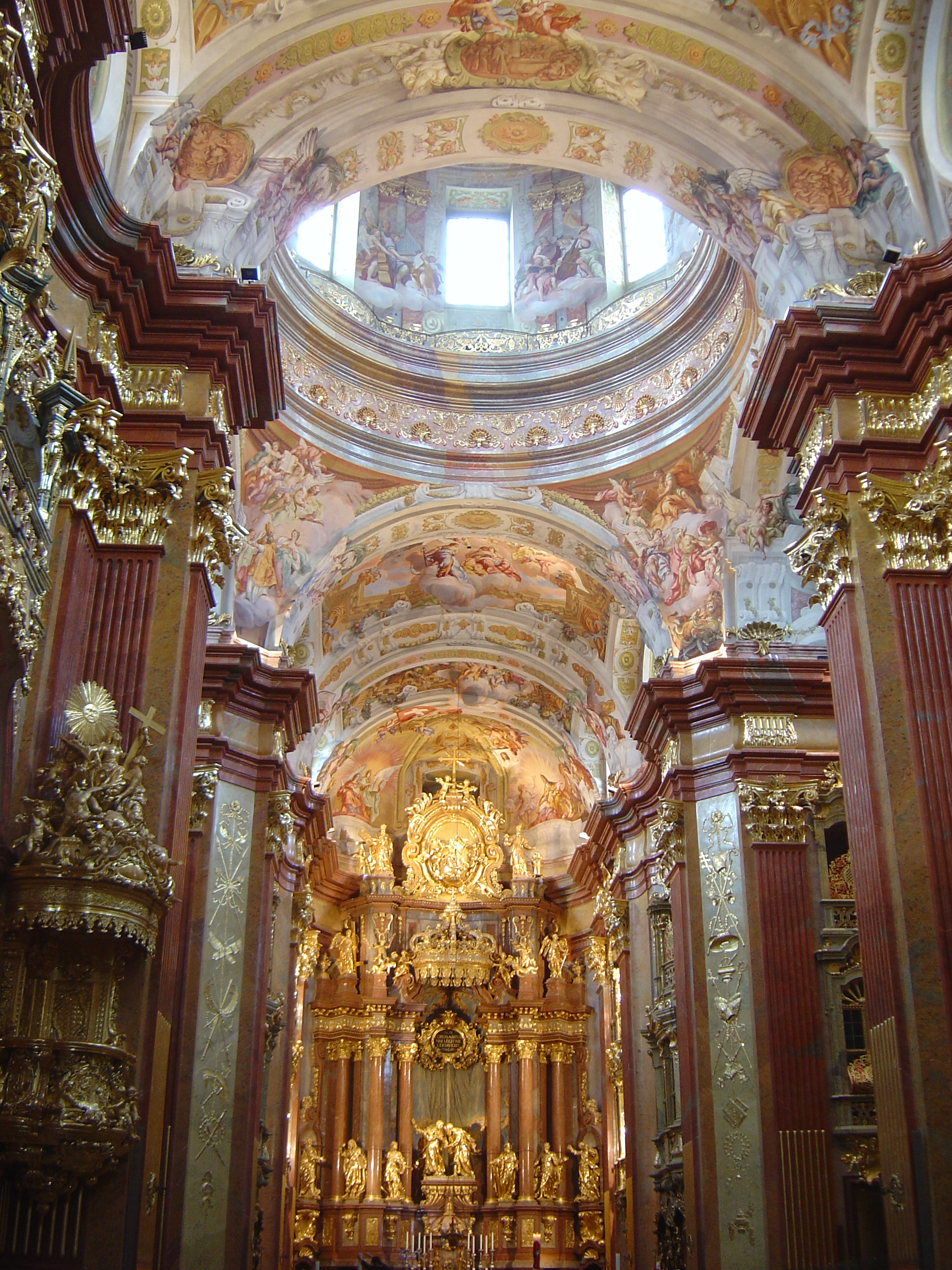
Church of the Abbey

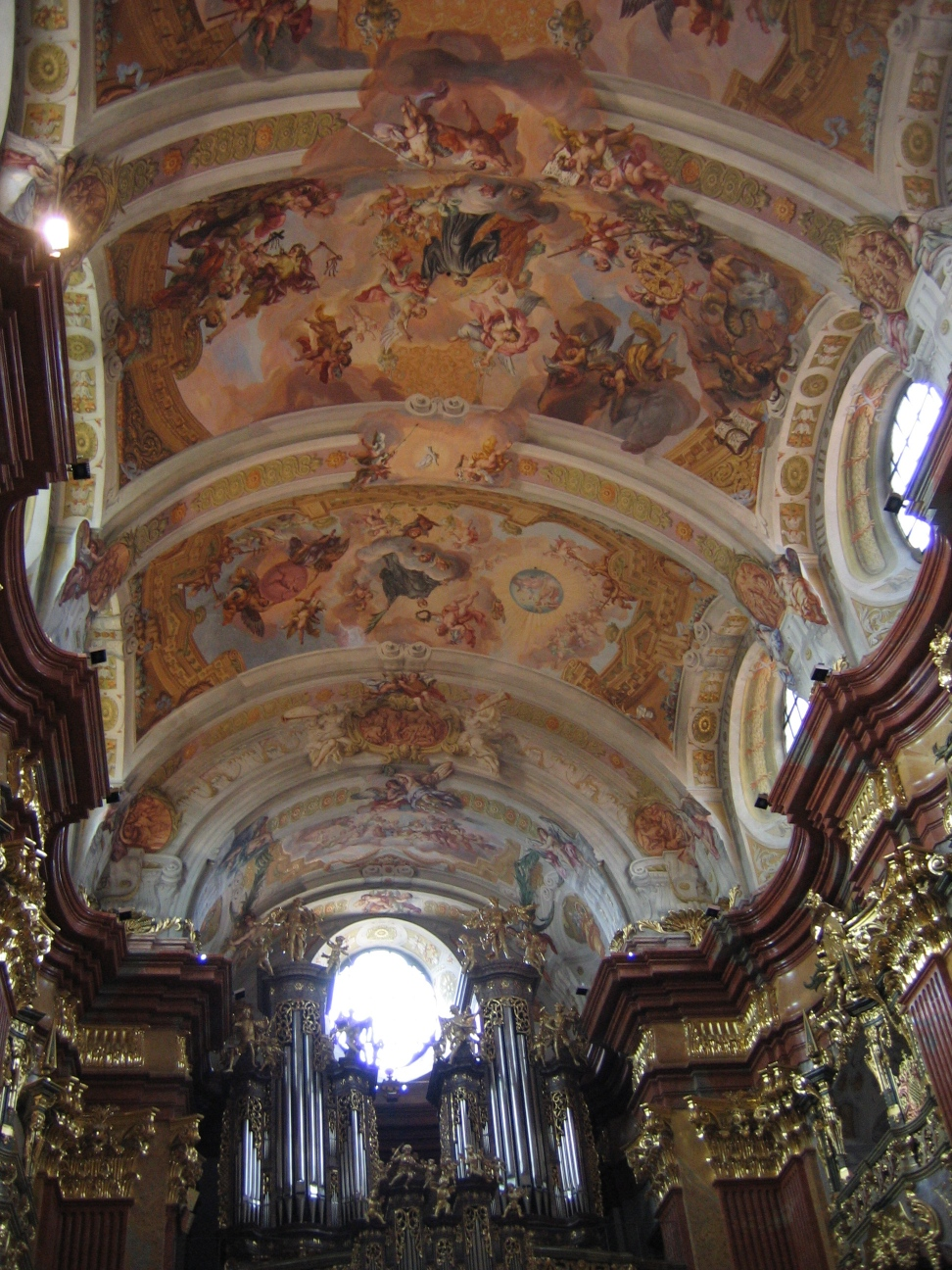
Frescoed ceiling of the church

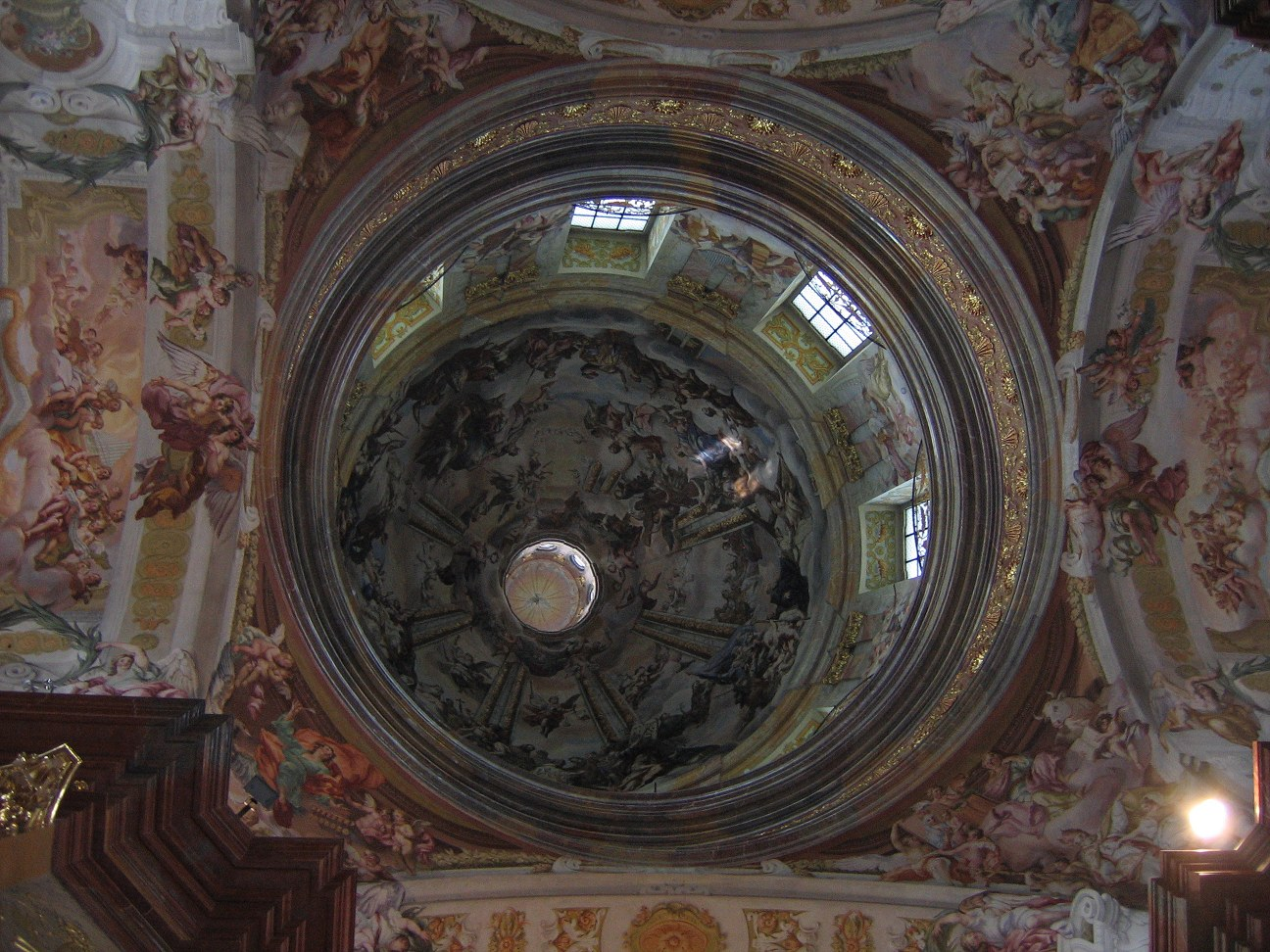
Cupola of the church

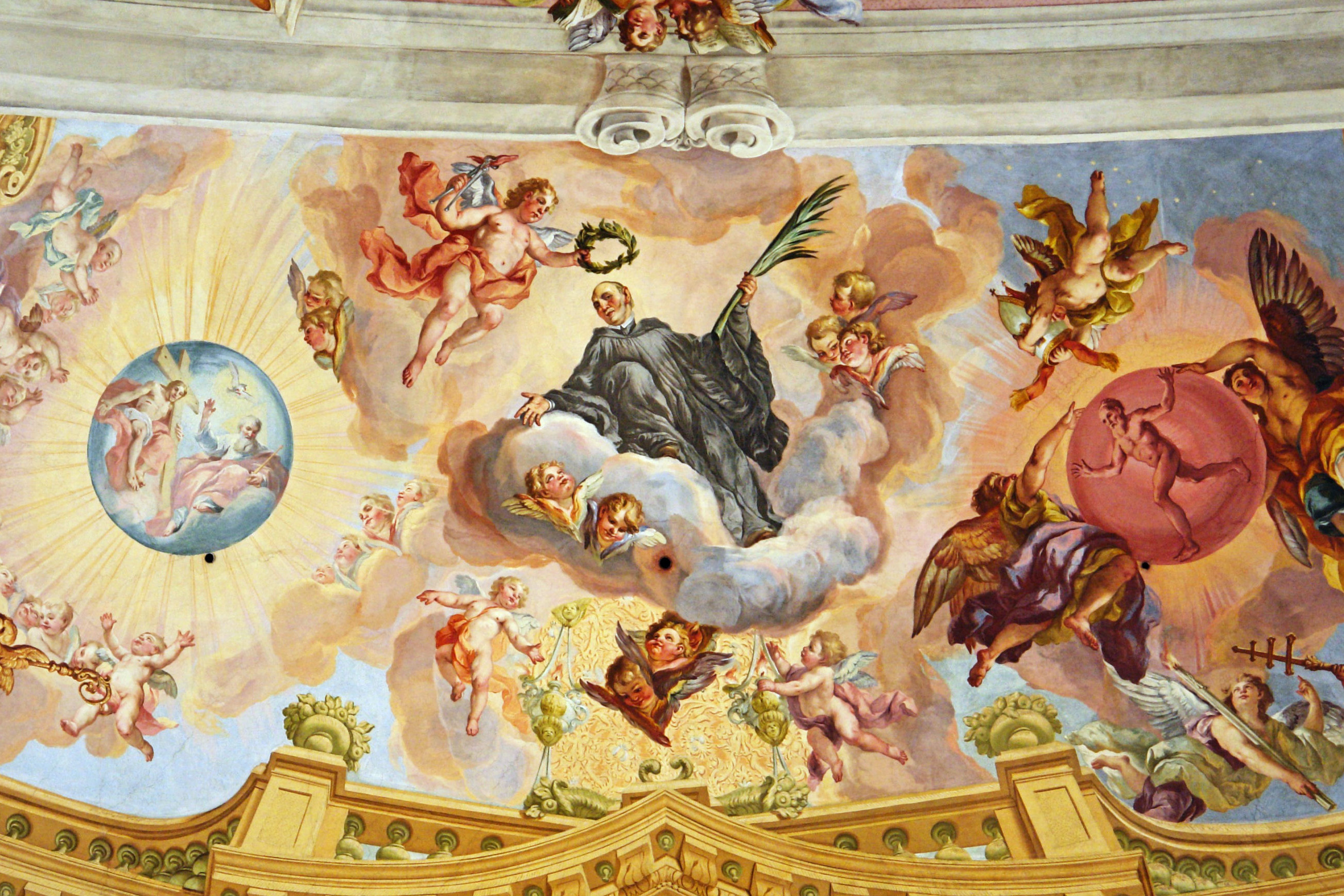
The Triumph of the Monk, by Johann Michael Rottmayr

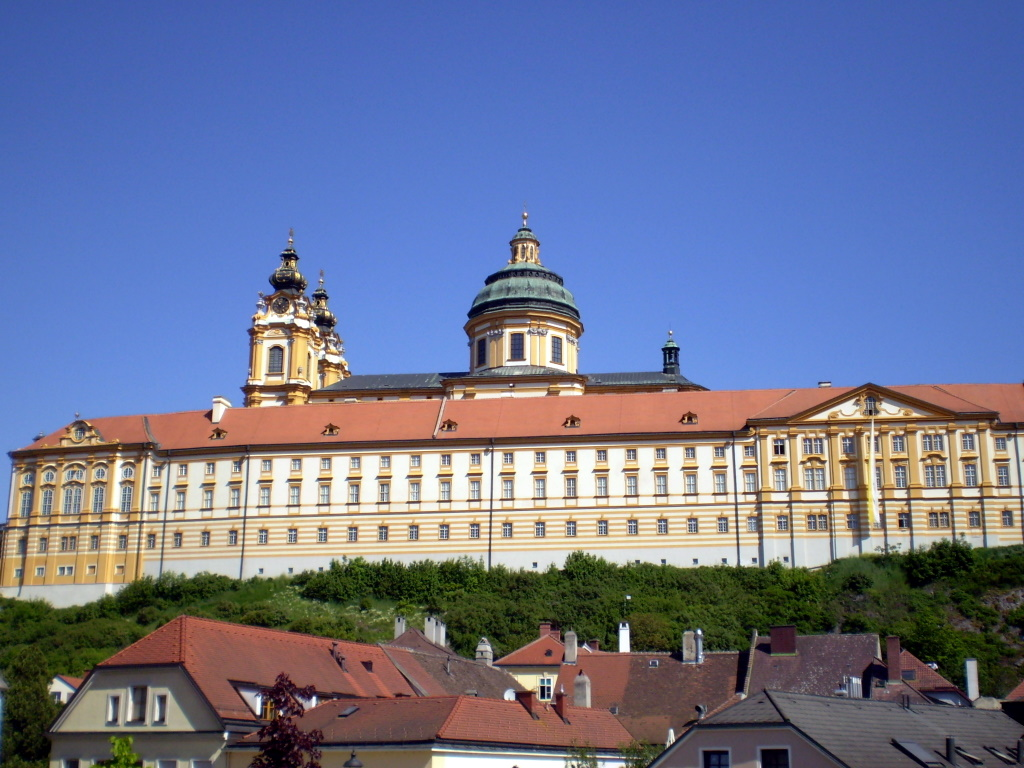
Melk Abbey

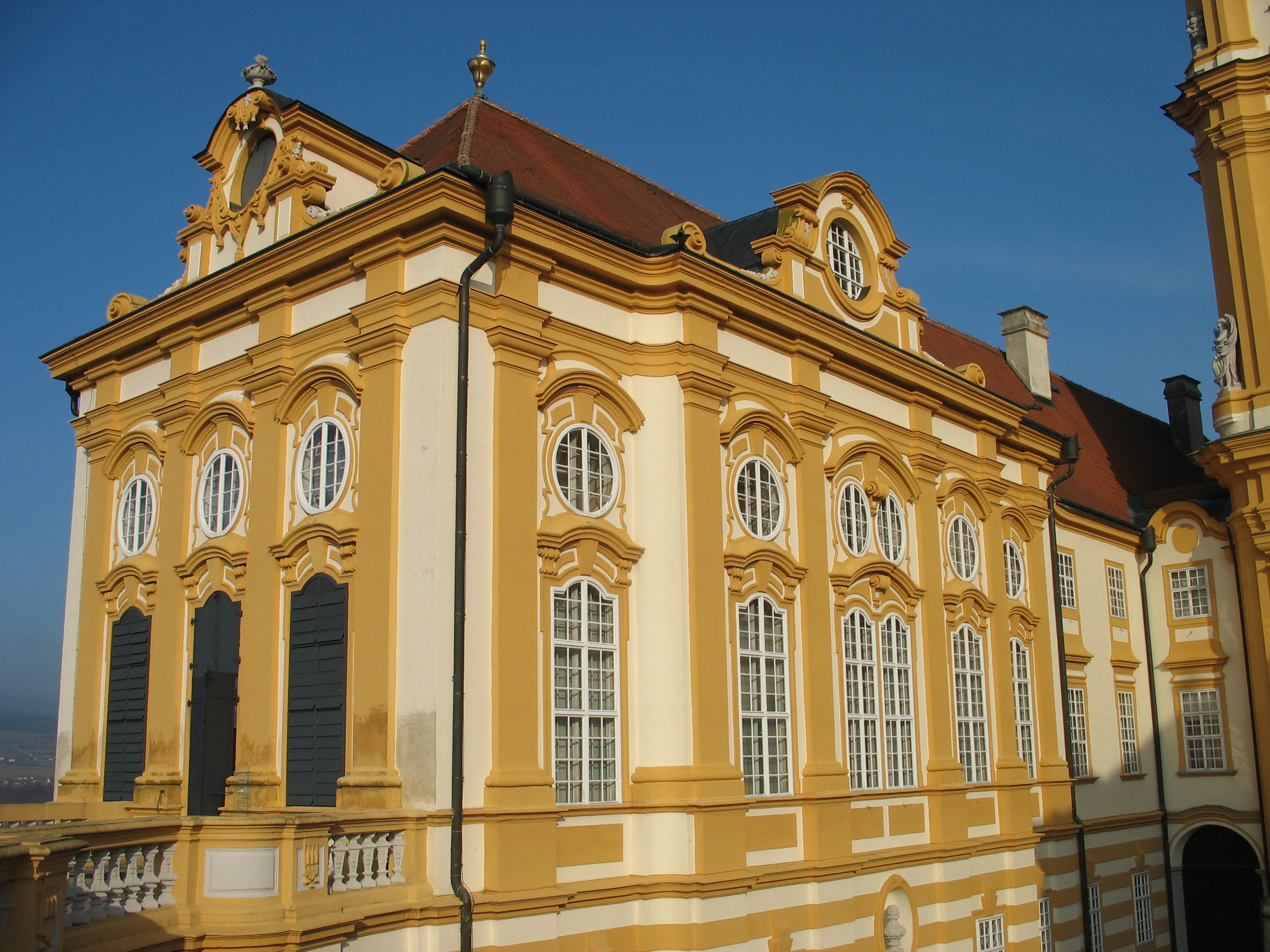
Melk Abbey (2007)

Melk Abbey (2023)

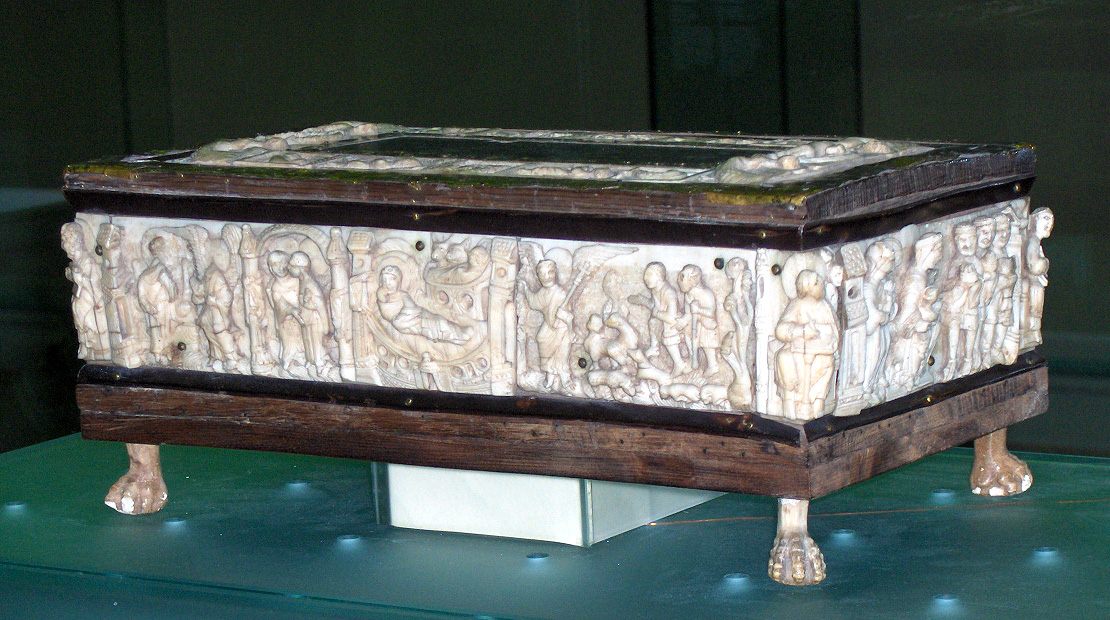
Margravine Swanhilde's altar, eleventh century

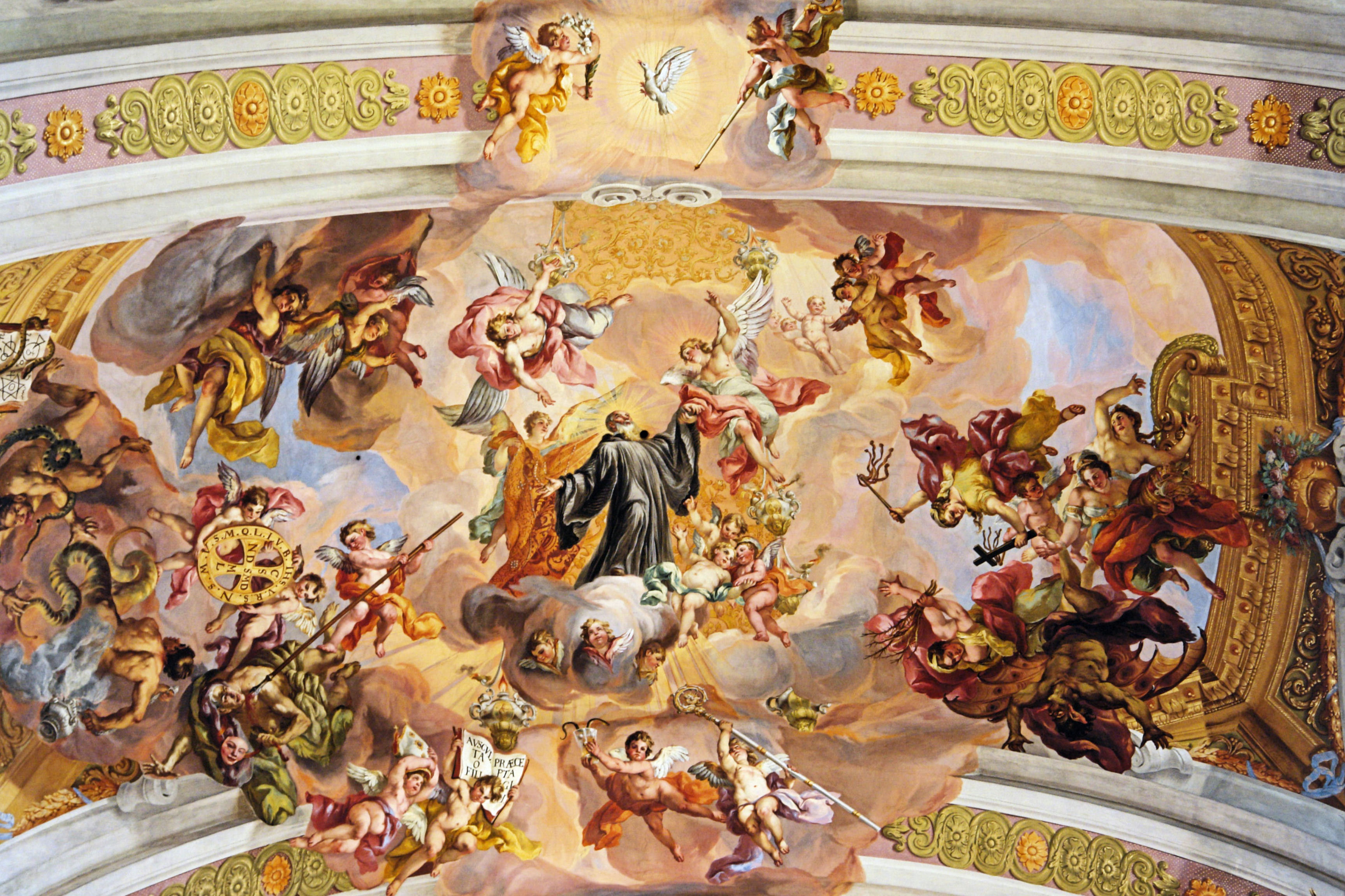
St. Benedict's triumphal ascent to Heaven, also by Rottmayr

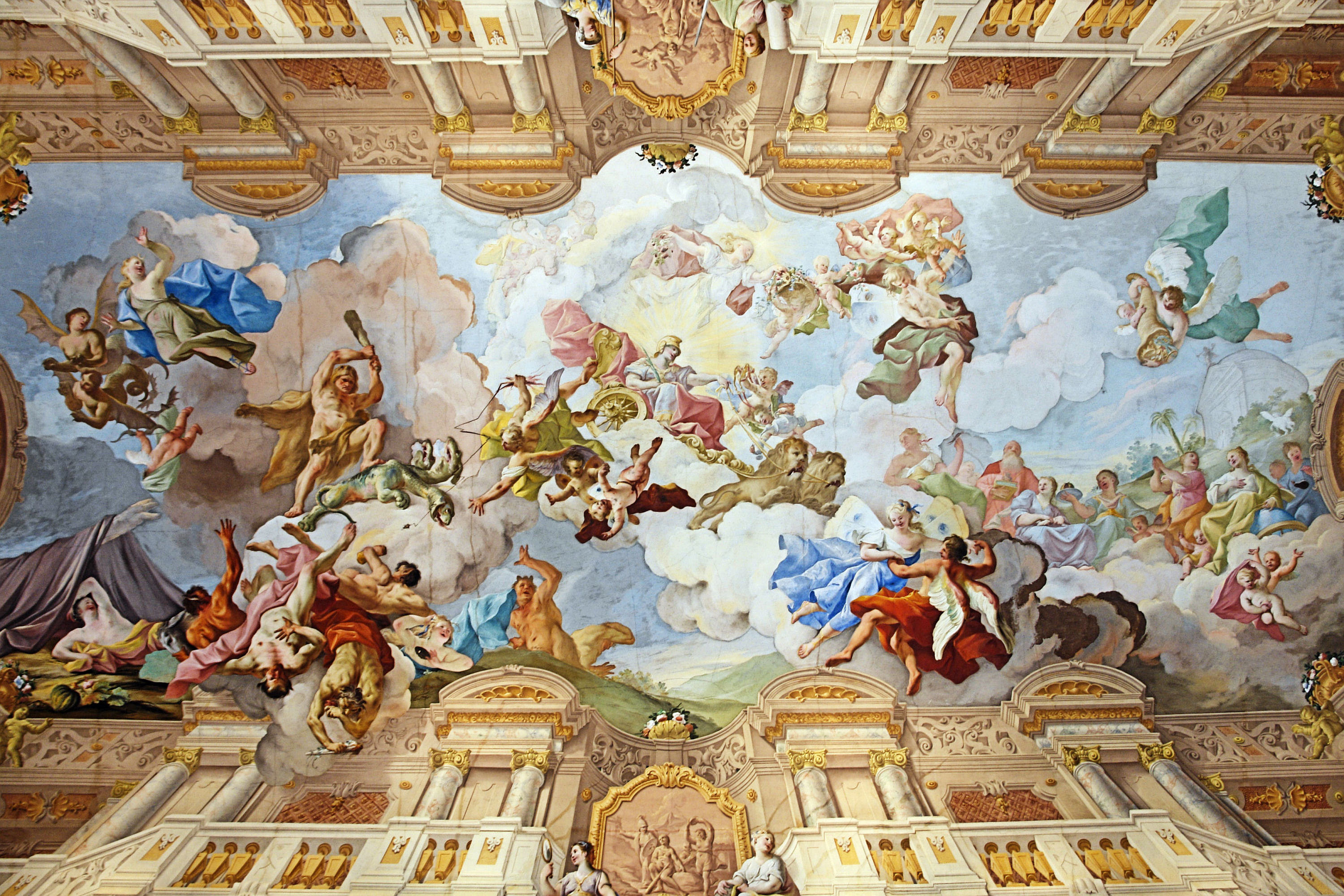
Painting on the ceiling of the marble hall

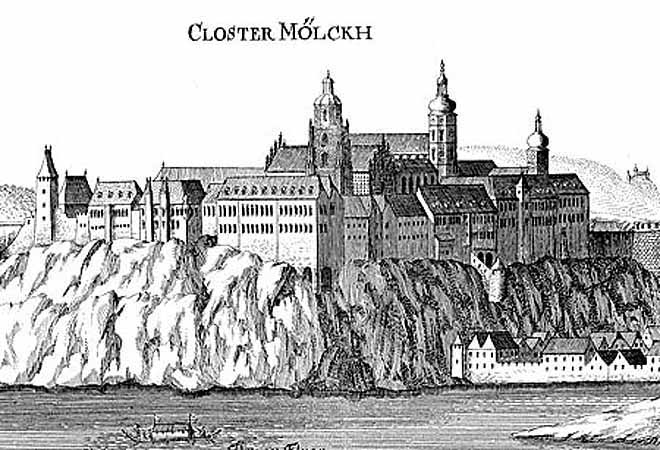
Melk Abbey in 1672, before its renovation by Jakob Prandtauer.
