= Uckermark I =

State electoral district of Germany

11: Uckermark I
- Electoral district for the Landtag of Brandenburg
- Uckermark I in 2024
- District: Uckermark
- Electorate: 45,603 (2024)
- Major settlements: Angermünde and Prenzlau

Current electoral district
- Created: 1994
- Party: AfD
- Member: Felix Teichner

Uckermark I is an electoral constituency (German: Wahlkreis) represented in the Landtag of Brandenburg. It elects one member via first-past-the-post voting. Under the constituency numbering system, it is designated as constituency 11. It is located in the Uckermark district.

== Geography ==
The constituency includes the towns of Nauen and Prenzlau, as well as the communities of Nordwestuckermark and Uckerland, and the administrative divisions of Brüssow, Gerswalde and Gramzow.

There were 45,603 eligible voters in 2024.

== Members ==
| Election | Member | Party | % |
|---|---|---|---|
| 2004 | Irene Wolff-Molorciuc | PDS | 28.8 |
| 2009 | Matthias Platzeck | SPD | 46.2 |
| 2014 | Uwe Schmidt | SPD | 34.9 |
| 2019 | Felix Teichner | AfD | 26.0 |
| 2024 | Felix Teichner | AfD | 39.8 |

== Election results ==
=== 2024 election ===
State election (2024): Uckermark I
| Notes: | Blue background denotes the winner of the electorate vote. Pink background denotes a candidate elected from their party list. Yellow background denotes an electorate win by a list member, or other incumbent. A ✓ or ✗ denotes status of any incumbent, win or lose respectively. | | | | | | |
| Party | Candidate | Votes | % | ±% | Party votes | % | ±% |
|---|---|---|---|---|---|---|---|
| AfD | ✓ Felix Teichner | 12,324 | 39.8 | ▲13.8 | 11,205 | 35.9 | ▲9.3 |
| SPD | Hanka Mittelstädt | 9,853 | 31.8 | ▲6.1 | 8,077 | 25.9 | ▲1.5 |
| BSW | | | | | 4,767 | 15.3 | |
| CDU | Fährmann | 4,464 | 14.4 | ▼4.8 | 3,683 | 11.8 | ▼6.7 |
| BVB/FW | Richter | 1,732 | 5.6 | ▼2.5 | 677 | 2.2 | ▼3.9 |
| Left | Krumrey | 1,693 | 5.5 | ▼6.2 | 907 | 2.9 | ▼8.2 |
| Greens | Heuermann | 420 | 1.4 | ▼5.7 | 805 | 2.6 | ▼5.1 |
| Tierschutzpartei | | | | | 482 | 1.5 | ▼0.4 |
| FDP | Gerulat | 330 | 1.1 | ▼1.3 | 161 | 0.5 | ▼2.1 |
| Plus | | | | | 158 | 0.5 | ▼0.3 |
| DLW | | | | | 147 | 0.5 | |
| Third Way | Fischer | 145 | 0.5 | | 70 | 0.2 | |
| Values | | | | | 47 | 0.2 | |
| DKP | | | | | 14 | 0.0 | |
| Informal votes | | 555 | | | 316 | | |
| Total valid votes | | 30,961 | | | 31,200 | | |
| Turnout | | 31,516 | 69.1 | ▲14.7 | | | |
| AfD hold | Majority | 2,471 | 8.0 | ▲7.7 | | | |

=== 2019 election ===
State election (2019): Uckermack I
| Notes: | Blue background denotes the winner of the electorate vote. Pink background denotes a candidate elected from their party list. Yellow background denotes an electorate win by a list member, or other incumbent. A ✓ or ✗ denotes status of any incumbent, win or lose respectively. | | | | | | |
| Party | Candidate | Votes | % | ±% | Party votes | % | ±% |
|---|---|---|---|---|---|---|---|
| AfD | Felix Teichner | 6,575 | 26.0 | ▲15.4 | 6,733 | 26.7 | ▲16.0 |
| SPD | Hanka Mittelstädt | 6,493 | 25.7 | ▼9.2 | 6,153 | 24.4 | ▼9.2 |
| CDU | Andreas Meyer | 4,852 | 19.2 | ▼8.0 | 4,673 | 18.5 | ▼7.2 |
| Left | Anne-Frieda Reinke | 2,940 | 11.6 | ▼8.0 | 2,817 | 11.2 | ▼7.7 |
| BVB/FW | Christine Wernicke | 2,034 | 8.0 | ▲4.8 | 1,540 | 6.1 | ▲4.2 |
| Greens | Britt Stordeur | 1,780 | 7.0 | ▲2.5 | 1,935 | 7.7 | ▲3.4 |
| FDP | Christoph Reiss | 609 | 2.4 | | 668 | 2.6 | ▲1.4 |
| Tierschutzpartei | | | | | 494 | 2.0 | |
| Pirates | | | | | 126 | 0.5 | ▼0.5 |
| ÖDP | | | | | 83 | 0.3 | |
| V-Partei3 | | | | | 42 | 0.2 | |
| Informal votes | | 327 | | | 346 | | |
| Total valid votes | | 25,283 | | | 25,264 | | |
| Turnout | | 25,610 | 54.4 | ▲12.5 | | | |
| AfD gain from SPD | Majority | 82 | 0.3 | | | | |

=== 2014 election ===
State election (2014): Uckermark I
| Notes: | Blue background denotes the winner of the electorate vote. Pink background denotes a candidate elected from their party list. Yellow background denotes an electorate win by a list member, or other incumbent. A ✓ or ✗ denotes status of any incumbent, win or lose respectively. | | | | | | |
| Party | Candidate | Votes | % | ±% | Party votes | % | ±% |
|---|---|---|---|---|---|---|---|
| SPD | Uwe Schmidt | 6,978 | 34.9 | ▼11.3 | 6,734 | 33.6 | Steady |
| CDU | Andreas Meyer | 5,448 | 27.2 | ▲9.2 | 5,158 | 25.7 | ▲4.7 |
| Left | Heiko Poppe | 3,923 | 19.6 | ▼3.1 | 3,782 | 18.9 | ▼8.5 |
| AfD | Aribert Christ | 2,123 | 10.6 | | 2,146 | 10.7 | |
| Greens | Steve Dahme | 899 | 4.5 | ▲2.3 | 865 | 4.3 | ▲0.6 |
| NPD | | | | | 463 | 2.3 | ▼1.7 |
| BVB/FW | Thomas Richter | 640 | 3.2 | ▲2.2 | 375 | 1.9 | ▲0.7 |
| FDP | | | | | 234 | 1.2 | ▼4.6 |
| Pirates | | | | | 201 | 1.0 | |
| REP | | | | | 49 | 0.2 | Steady |
| DKP | | | | | 43 | 0.2 | ▲0.1 |
| Informal votes | | 359 | | | 320 | | |
| Total valid votes | | 20,011 | | | 20,050 | | |
| Turnout | | 20,370 | 41.9 | ▼21.4 | | | |
| SPD hold | Majority | 1,530 | 7.7 | ▼15.8 | | | |

=== 2009 election ===
State election (2009): Uckermark I
| Notes: | Blue background denotes the winner of the electorate vote. Pink background denotes a candidate elected from their party list. Yellow background denotes an electorate win by a list member, or other incumbent. A ✓ or ✗ denotes status of any incumbent, win or lose respectively. | | | | | | |
| Party | Candidate | Votes | % | ±% | Party votes | % | ±% |
|---|---|---|---|---|---|---|---|
| SPD | Matthias Platzeck | 14,598 | 46.2 | ▲25.4 | 10,573 | 33.6 | ▲7.0 |
| Left | ✗ Irene Wolff-Molorciuc | 7,154 | 22.7 | ▼6.1 | 8,606 | 27.4 | ▼4.0 |
| CDU | Alard von Arnim | 5,684 | 18.0 | ▼0.7 | 6,602 | 21.0 | ▲1.6 |
| FDP | Andreas Büttner | 1,389 | 4.4 | ▼1.3 | 1,810 | 5.8 | ▲2.2 |
| NPD | Klaus Beier | 1,232 | 3.9 | | 1,260 | 4.0 | |
| Greens | Robert Schindler | 705 | 2.2 | ▲0.1 | 1,172 | 3.7 | ▲1.2 |
| 50Plus | Herbert Schmidt | 332 | 1.1 | | 310 | 1.0 | ▼1.4 |
| BVB/FW | Manfred Ehlert | 310 | 1.0 | | 377 | 1.2 | |
| Die-Volksinitiative | | | | | 246 | 0.8 | |
| DVU | | | | | 230 | 0.7 | ▼6.4 |
| Independent | Kay-Christopher Wagenitz | 171 | 0.5 | | | | |
| RRP | | | | | 136 | 0.4 | |
| REP | | | | | 56 | 0.2 | |
| DKP | | | | | 46 | 0.1 | Steady |
| Informal votes | | 891 | | | 1,042 | | |
| Total valid votes | | 31,575 | | | 31,424 | | |
| Turnout | | 32,466 | 63.3 | ▲10.7 | | | |
| SPD gain from PDS | Majority | 7,444 | 23.5 | | | | |

=== 2004 election ===
State election (2004): Uckermark I
| Notes: | Blue background denotes the winner of the electorate vote. Pink background denotes a candidate elected from their party list. Yellow background denotes an electorate win by a list member, or other incumbent. A ✓ or ✗ denotes status of any incumbent, win or lose respectively. | | | | | | |
| Party | Candidate | Votes | % | ±% | Party votes | % | ±% |
|---|---|---|---|---|---|---|---|
| PDS | Irene Wolff-Molorciuc | 7,821 | 28.84 | | 8,560 | 31.41 | |
| SPD | Wolgang Birthler | 5,636 | 20.78 | | 7,263 | 26.65 | |
| Independent | Hans-Joachim Mengel | 5,106 | 18.83 | | | | |
| CDU | Alard von Arnim | 5,060 | 18.66 | | 5,294 | 19.42 | |
| DVU | | | | | 1,933 | 7.09 | |
| FDP | Klaus Scheffel | 1,553 | 5.73 | | 984 | 3.61 | |
| Familie | | | | | 825 | 3.03 | |
| Greens | Thomas Wesche | 565 | 2.08 | | 677 | 2.48 | |
| 50Plus | | | | | 643 | 2.36 | |
| AfW (Free Voters) | Angelika Böcker | 498 | 1.84 | | 124 | 0.45 | |
| BRB | René Zscheckel | 495 | 1.83 | | 418 | 1.53 | |
| Gray Panthers | | | | | 150 | 0.55 | |
| Yes Brandenburg | | | | | 145 | 0.53 | |
| Schill | Ronald Vogel | 384 | 1.42 | | 107 | 0.39 | |
| AUB-Brandenburg | | | | | 94 | 0.34 | |
| DKP | | | | | 37 | 0.14 | |
| Informal votes | | 874 | | | 738 | | |
| Total valid votes | | 27,118 | | | 27,254 | | |
| Turnout | | 27,992 | 52.61 | | | | |
| PDS win new seat | Majority | 2,185 | 8.06 | | | | |

== See also ==
- Politics of Brandenburg
- Landtag of Brandenburg
