= Franz Schneider (composer) =

Franz Schneider (baptized 2 October 1737, Pulkau – 5 February 1812, Melk) was an Austrian composer and organist. He trained as a musician under Johann Georg Albrechtsberger, and succeeded his teacher as organist at the Melk Abbey in 1766. He took on the additional duties of musical director at the abbey in 1787. He remained in both of those positions until his death in 1812. He wrote many works for the organ and choral and vocal pieces, but is best known for his 47 masses which were widely used in Austrian churches during his lifetime and for which numerous copies exist.
