= Felix Teichner =

German politician (born 1991)

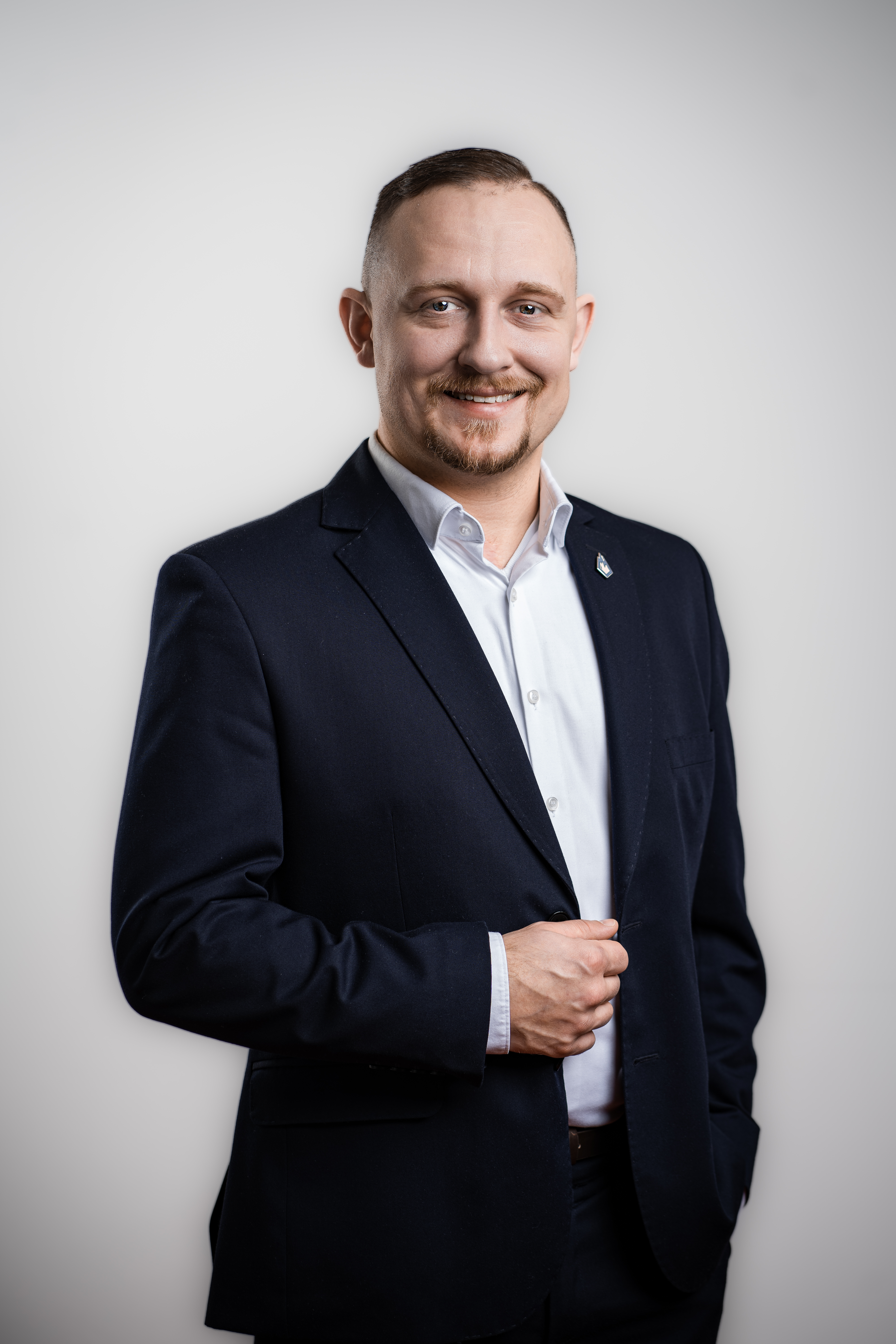
- Teichner in 2023

Member of the Landtag of Brandenburg
- Incumbent
- Assumed office 25 September 2019
- Preceded by: Uwe Schmidt
- Constituency: Uckermark I

Personal details
- Born: 1991 (age 34–35) Prenzlau
- Party: Alternative for Germany (since 2016)

Felix Horst Wolfgang Teichner (born 1991 in Prenzlau) is a German politician serving as a member of the Landtag of Brandenburg since 2019. He has served as chairman of the far-right Alternative for Germany in Uckermark since 2019.
