= Frau Minne =

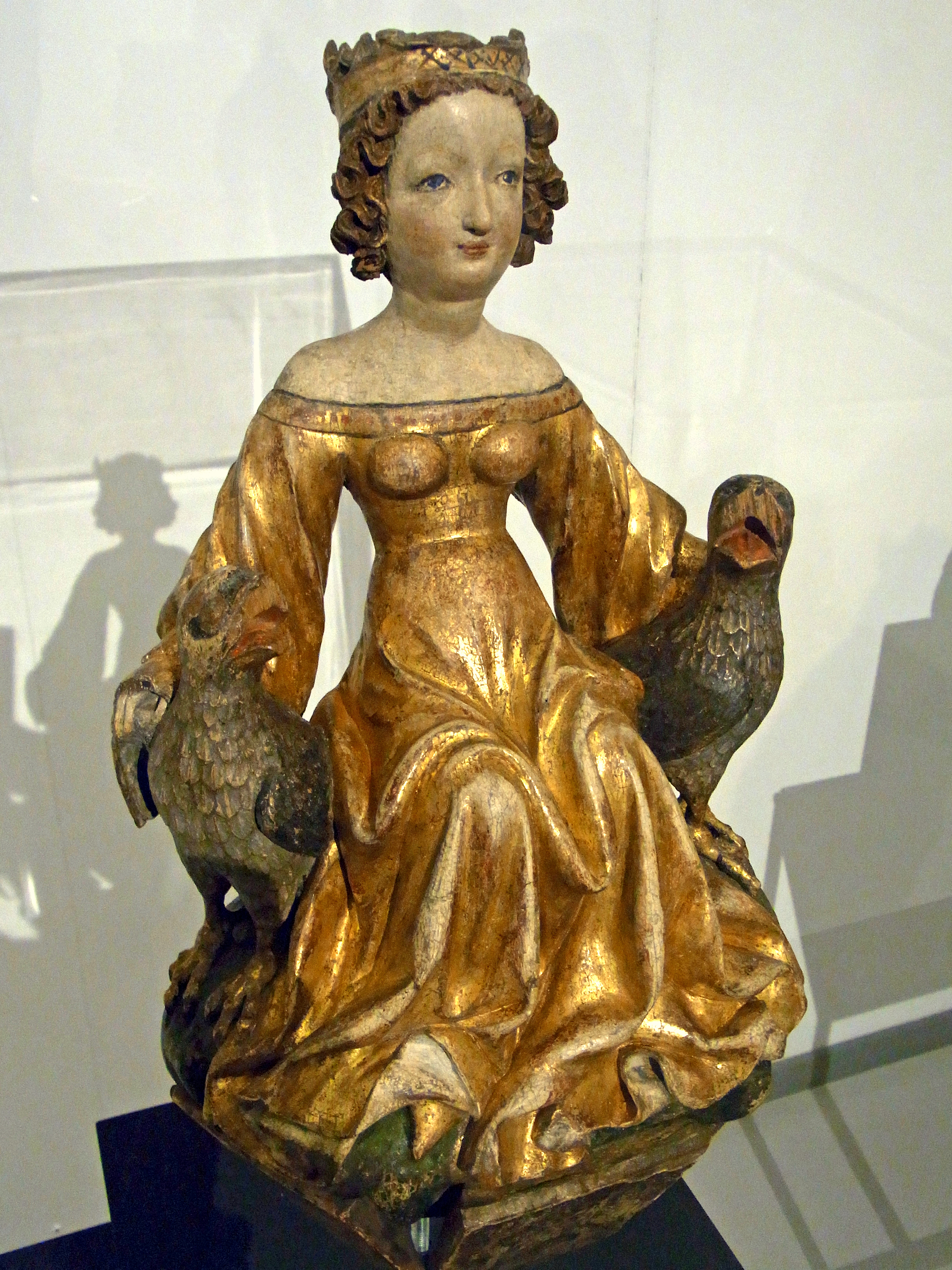
German chandelier sculpture, ca. 1430, possibly depicting Frau Minne as queen

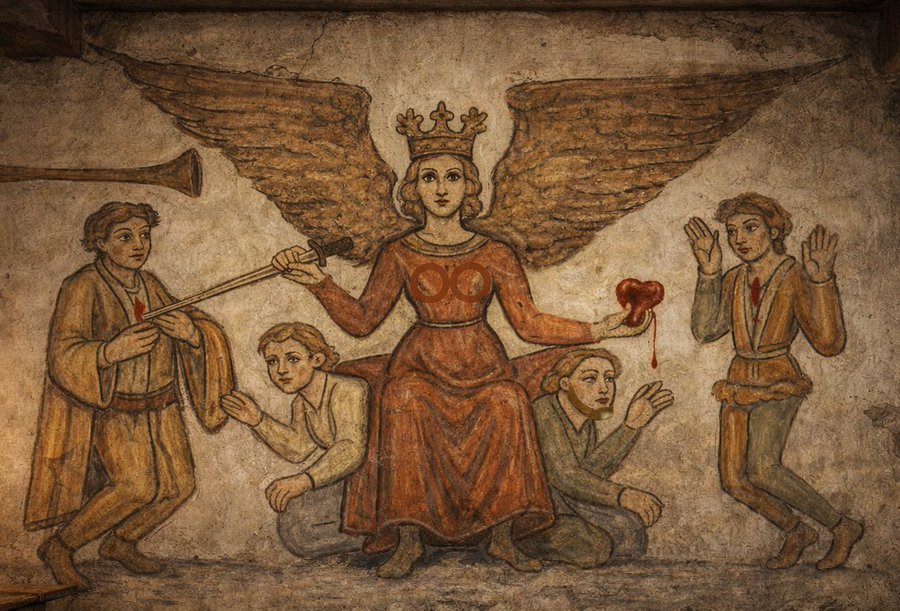
Depiction of Frau Minne from wall of a guild house in Zurich - dated 1400

Frau Minne (vrowe minne) is a personification of courtly love in Middle High German literature. She is frequently addressed directly in Minnesang poetry, usually by the pining lover complaining about his state, but she appears also in the longer Minnerede poems, and in prose works.

A rare allegorical painting of ca. 1400, showing Frau Minne presiding over suffering lovers having their hearts torn from their breasts, was discovered in a guild house in Zurich in 2009.

Frau Minne is sometimes referred to as the “goddess” of romantic love who instils in people feelings of passion and passionate behavior, which is differentiated from other religiously celebrated kinds of love such as Buddhist compassion or Christian charity (agape).

== See also ==
- Das Kloster der Minne (The Monastery of Love)

== Literature ==
- Dorothea Wiercinski, Minne, Niederdeutsche Studien, 1964.
- Konrad Falke, Frau Minne: ein mittelalterlicher Weltspiegel. 1905.
