= Scheißtag =

Unpaid working days in Germany and Austria

Scheißtage (literally "shitting days") referred to the additional one to three unpaid working days in Southern Germany and Austria for peasants and servants to compensate for the time they needed to defecate during their agreed employment.

This practice existed in the 18th and 19th centuries, and occasionally even until the early 20th century. The "Scheißtage" were performed after the expiration of the employment contract, usually after Candlemas, or at the end of each year on the 29th. or December 30.

Nowadays, the term Scheißtag is used in a vulgar-colloquial sense to mean a bad day.

== Literature ==
- Entry in Johann Andreas Schmeller, Georg Karl Frommann: Bayerisches Wörterbuch. 2nd edition, revised and supplemented by G. Karl Fromann. Volume 2, containing part III and IV of the first edition. Munich 1877, p. 475 (digital edition).
- scheisztag. In: Jacob Grimm, Wilhelm Grimm (Hrsg.): Deutsches Wörterbuch. Band 14: R–Schiefe – (VIII). S. Hirzel, Leipzig 1893 (woerterbuchnetz.de). – refers to the entry in Schmeller's work.
