= The Monastery of Love =

14th century German Minnerede

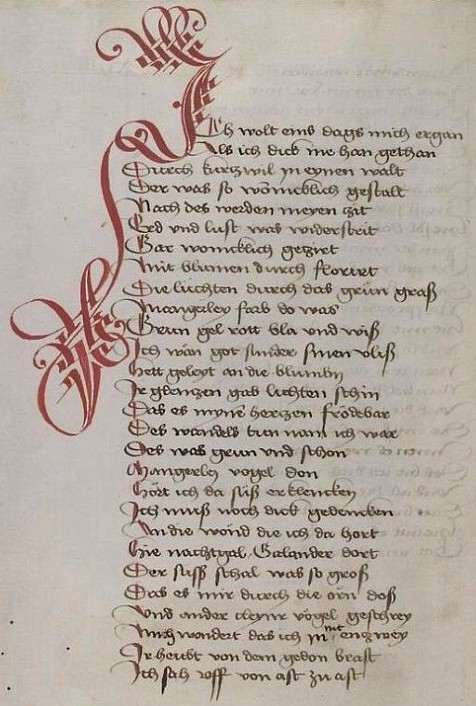
Beginning of the Minnerede The Monastery of Love in Cod. pal. germ. 313.

The Monastery of Love (Das Kloster der Minne) is a Minnerede (courtly love story) or Minneallegorie (courtly love allegory) from the 2nd quarter of the 14th century. The poem consists of up to 1890 rhyming couplets and was probably composed between 1330 and 1350 in southern Germany. The author is unknown.

The Monastery of Love is the story of a wanderer who is shown the way to a monastery by a messenger on horseback. In the monastery, whose headmistress is said to be Lady Love herself, he meets an acquaintance who shows him the building and with whom he watches a tournament before leaving the monastery again. Despite repeated requests, he has not met Lady Love in person, as she is only visible through her effect on the inhabitants of the monastery.

Due to the uncertain chronological classification and the anonymity of the author, The Monastery of Love has repeatedly become the focus of literary scholarship since the 19th century, for which it was of interest until the late 20th century, particularly in terms of its presumed relationship to the rules of the monastery of Ettal. In terms of content, the special feature of the work in comparison to other narrative Minnerede and Minneallegories is that it avoids personifications, meaning, for example, that Lady Love (Frau Minne) does not appear as a woman.

== Tradition ==
=== Cod. Donaueschingen 104 ("Liedersaal manuscript") ===
The oldest known manuscript of The Monastery of Love is contained in Cod. Donaueschingen 104. The codex was created around 1433 and is written in Alemannic dialect. The manuscript probably came from Konstanz. The manuscript originally had 269 pages, and The Monastery of Love has a length of 1890 verses. Of all three surviving manuscripts, it is the oldest and most reliable version, which is also the best preserved. The Minnerede has no heading in the Donaueschingen manuscript. The Cod. Donaueschingen 104 is now kept in the Baden State Library.

Joseph von Laßberg published the Donaueschingen manuscript between 1820 and 1825 under the title Lieder Saal. This is a collection of old German poems from unprinted sources. Laßberg gave the then untitled Minnerede the title The Monastery of Love. According to Laßberg, who considered The Monastery of Love to be the most beautiful work in his collection, Cod. Donaueschingen 104 is also known as the "Liedersaal manuscript".

=== Codex Dresden M 68 ===
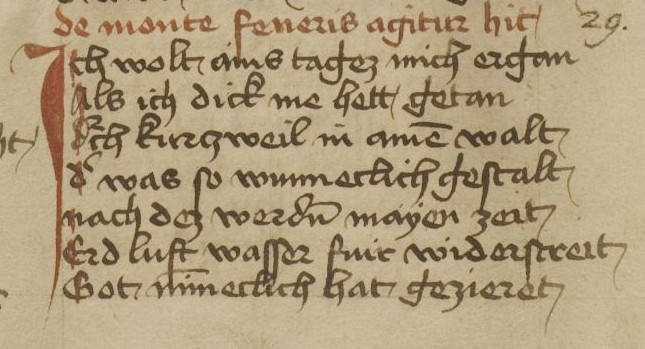
Beginning of the Minnerede De monte feneris agitur hic in Codex Dresden M 68.

Codex Dresden M 68 comes from Augsburg and was written in 1447 by Peter Grienninger in the East Swabian dialect. The manuscript has a total of 79 pages and contains 35 smaller poetic texts, such as fairy tales, prayers, love letters and Minnereden, including the Minnelehre of Johann von Konstanz. The monastery of Love comprises 1866 verses in this manuscript. Of the surviving manuscripts, Codex Dresden M 68 is the most deficient. It contains numerous individual verses, some of which even impair the meaning, and has surplus plus verses, while at the same time rhyming couplets from the other manuscripts are missing. Peter Grienninger was not always sure of the spelling either: Grienninger gave the Minnerede the title De monte feneris agitur hit, which was corrected to De monte feneris agitur hic (translation: This is about the Venusberg). The manuscript is now kept in the Saxon State and University Library Dresden.

=== Cod. Pal. germ. 313 ===
The most recent surviving manuscript of The Monastery of Love is kept in the Heidelberg University Library. The Cod. Pal. germ. 313 is 498 pages long and dates from 1478. It was written in the North Alemannic-South Franconian dialect, which is why today the Upper Rhine region is assumed to be the origin of the scribe. The Cod. Pal. germ. 313 contains not only The Monastery of Love, which is preserved on 63 pages and in 1884 verses, but also 55 other Minnereden by Heinrich der Teichner (Knight or servant), Meister Altswert (The old sword, The smock) and Fröschel von Leidnitz (Overheard love conversation), among others. The Minnerede The Monastery of Love is included in Johann von Konstanz's Minnelehre and Hermann von Sachsenheim's Mirror.

=== Manuscript relationship ===
None of the three paper manuscripts that preserve The Monastery of Love represents the original archetype. On the basis of the known manuscripts, it is possible to reconstruct two branches of The Monastery of Love. The Codex Donaueschingen forms one of the two branches, as it lacks four verses that are contained in both the Codex Dresden M 68 and the Cod. pal. germ. 313. Since both younger manuscripts lack a verse that the Codex Donaueschingen possesses, there must be a common model for these manuscripts that refers to the archetype. Furthermore, Codex Dresden M 68 cannot have served as a model for Cod. pal. germ. 313, because Cod. pal. germ. 313, together with the Donaueschingen manuscript, contains verses that are missing in Codex Dresden M 68. The age of the manuscripts also rules out a copy of Codex Dresden M 68 from Cod. pal. germ. 313.

== Content ==
=== Walk in the forest ===
The first-person narrator goes for a walk in May, leading him into a forest. He admires the flowers, the green treetops and the song of the nightingale and lark. He soon spots a woman on horseback among the trees. He hides from her until her horse is close to where he is hiding and only then reveals himself. He grabs the horse by the bridle and prevents the lady from riding on. Before he lets her go, he wants to know the purpose of her ride alone in the forest. The woman tells him she is traveling as a messenger of the werdi Minne (Lady Love) who, as a noble queen, has power over all the lands of the earth. The narrator is not yet satisfied with this information and demands to know the purpose of her journey. The rider explains that she is looking for women, knights and servants to join Lady Love. After asking again, the rider reveals further details: a (master) builder has created a unique, huge monastery in which Love lives. Anyone who enters the monastery will have a wonderful life and people from all social classes will go there: kings, dukes, counts, maids, knights and servants. All residents had to abide by a monastery rule according to which they were to be subject to Love. They were allowed to sing, read, make music and dance. The shape and nature of the monastery is unique: it is circular and unimaginably large. ez war kain pferd nie so snel, / das es in ainem gantzen jar / das closter umbe lüffe gar. The monastery has twelve gates, each representing a month. Theoretically, the inhabitants of the monastery therefore have the opportunity to live in their favorite month all the time. The narrator is fascinated by this world and longs to see the Monastery of Love with his own eyes. The rider describes the way to the monastery, which the narrator - choosing the right path at a fork in the road - will enter via the May gate. The narrator is satisfied with the answers and lets the rider move on. After a short time, he arrives at the Monastery of Love.

=== Arrival at the monastery ===
As he stands in front of the walls of the monastery, a group of men and women move out of the monastery gate into the open and gather for a round dance. They appear to be lovers who, after dancing, sit down in pairs in the shade of the trees in front of the monastery gate. The narrator notices (wedding) rings on numerous fingers and feels miserable. Among the couples are numerous acquaintances from earlier days, but they do not recognize the narrator. Suddenly a bell is rung. A squire announces the arrival of 500 knights and servants who want to hold a tournament with the residents of the monastery. The best knight is promised the crest of a lion with a golden chain as a prize in the spear fight. The best servant is to receive the coat of arms of a leopard with a silver chain. The men return to the monastery to prepare for the tournament.

=== Tour through the monastery ===
Among the women who stayed behind, the narrator discovers a good acquaintance. She tells him that she has been living in the convent for ten years and, accompanied by a few other women, shows him around the convent: the large courtyard is enclosed by a main building, with a door leading into it from each of the four walls. The building has balconies and bay windows and is made of different-colored, partially openwork marble. The walls shine like mirrors, making the whole building appear incomparably beautiful to the narrator. However, his companion points out that there are many of these buildings in the monastery.

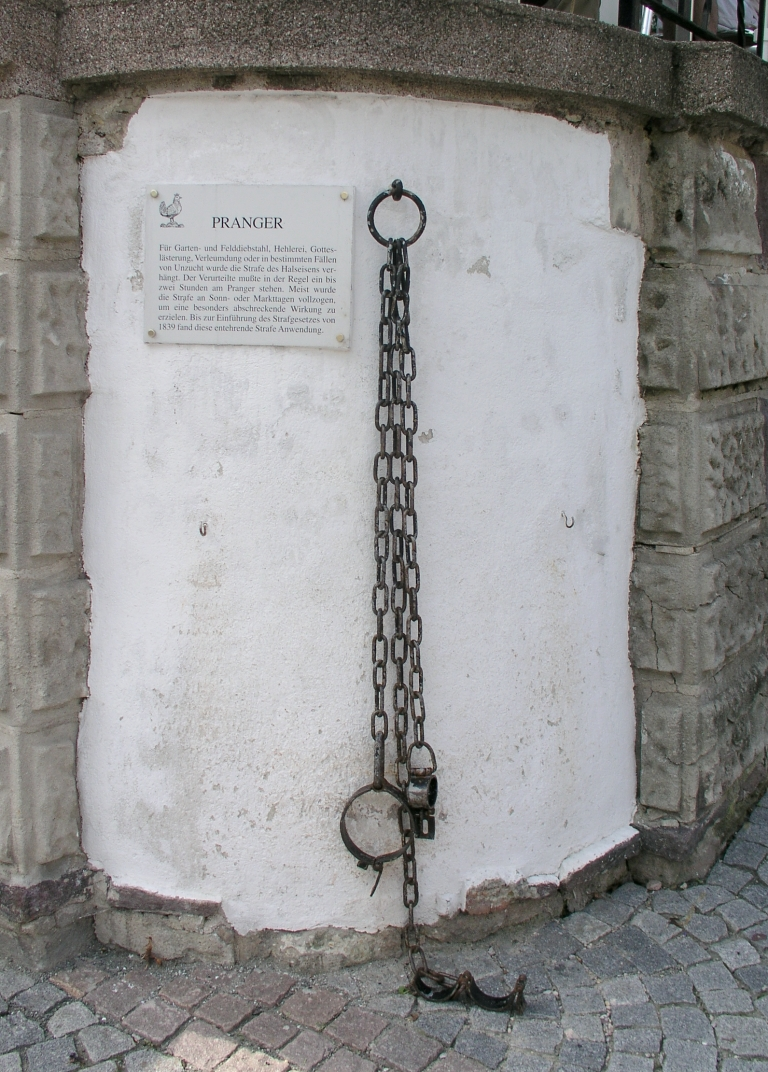
The neck iron was a common form of punishment in the Middle Ages. In The Monastery of Love, a gossip was punished in this way.

As the tournament is due to start soon, the other women say goodbye to the narrator. The acquaintance stays with him and talks about the nature of the order. Love rules over all the inhabitants of the monastery, but they are headed by an abbot and an abbess as well as a prior and a prioress. Anyone who fails to abide by the rules of the monastery will be punished. The nature of the punishments is shown during a tour of the monastery prison: a gossiper is tied up with a neck iron. He asks the narrator for bread as he is starving and begs him to ask the abbot for mercy as he has been imprisoned for three years for insulting a woman. The lady accompanying the narrator warns him that he would make himself unpopular if he went to the abbot on this matter. After the narrator has promised her not to stand up for the prisoners, the companion leads him to a braggart lying on old straw tied to a block. Originally he was a noble servant, but he bragged about his love affairs. Mockers, envious, fickle and cowardly people are also in the monastery prison, but the narrator decides to return with his companion to the other women and watch the tournament.

=== The tournament ===
The narrator and his friend see the monks of the monastery dressed in knight's armor. Shortly afterwards, the monastery's guests arrive at the palace courtyard and the tournament begins. In the course of the tournament, the narrator pretends to be impartial, but at the same time rarely knows who belongs to the guests and who belongs to the monastery inhabitants. At the end of the tournament, the prior is honored as the best knight and the monastery porter as the best servant. Both are again attacked by guests after receiving their prizes. The prior successfully defends himself, but the porter is seriously injured and has to be carried off the field. When the narrator points out to his horrified companion that tournaments have to be brutal in order to win the hearts of women, his acquaintance lectures him: Tournaments primarily only benefited the knight or servant, who could improve his fighting skills in the game and thus make a name for himself. There are certainly some men who only fight for the sake of a woman's favor, but they have misunderstood the real purpose of the tournament. The narrator and his acquaintance talk about the basic layout of the monastery, in which traitors, robbers and usurers have no place. Doch wer sich möcht begeben / und dise regel halten, / der möcht in fröuden alten / und doch da by dienen got. When the narrator finally wishes to see Love in person, he justifies this with reports that Love would wound the body and heart with her arrow and that people would torture themselves as a result. His acquaintance tells him that Love herself is invisible and can only be seen in all her effects among the men and women of the monastery, but the narrator refuses to believe her. When the acquaintance feels mocked by him, he apologizes to her and thanks her for her help. She hints that they could become a couple if she knew him longer. As the guests defeated in the tournament want to come back in 12 days, the acquaintance invites the narrator back to the monastery in 12 days. During this time, the still hesitant man can decide whether he wants to spend the rest of his life in the monastery or not.

=== Farewell ===
The acquaintance and one of her friends want to take the narrator to the convent gate, but they stop briefly in the acquaintance's room, which is richly decorated and ornate. The narrator feels uncomfortable in the small room. When she shows him her large bed, he wishes he could throw himself on it (with her), but does not dare. The companion, who guesses his thoughts, laughs at him. Together they drink St. John's wine, after which the narrator leaves both women in the room and hurries out of the monastery. He returns to the forest, where the birdsong and the flowers seem insignificant in contrast to the colorful hustle and bustle of the monastery. He longs to return to the monastery and knows that "lat mich got so lang leben, / ich wil mich in daz closter geben / und wil die regel halten / und in dem closter alten."

== Genre, literary models and style ==
=== Genre ===
The Monastery of Love belongs to the literary genre of so-called Minnereden, which was mainly popular in the late Middle Ages and can also be described as a love-allegory.

==== Minnerede ====
The text is a Minnerede because it treats the topic of courtly love (in Middle High German, Minne) in a didactic or instructive manner for long stretches. This is evident from the plot: the narrator's questions are answered by his companion, followed by counter-questions from the narrator. The course of the plot follows the course of the didactic conversation between the narrator and his lady and between the narrator and the messenger in the forest at the beginning of the plot. However, instructive passages alternate with narrative and descriptive passages (for example during the tournament).

==== Love-allegory ====
With some reservations, The Monastery of Love can be described as a love-allegory. "The actual allegory is missing in so far as not only none of the otherwise popular personifications such as honor, shame, stature, dignity, confidence and the like, but also "love" herself, the much-mentioned one, does not appear in person." The reader's expectations in this regard are instead deliberately deceived in that love is apparently described as a person in the narrator's conversation with the messenger, for example, she is the mistress of the messenger and has gewalt über alli lant; sie ist ain edli künigin. The narrator therefore logically wonders, when he arrives at the monastery and sees the inhabitants dancing, whether Love is perhaps one of the dancing women. He tells his companion that he wants to see Love, and she leads him to the people of the monastery, who are together in harmony. The narrator nevertheless expects to see Love as a person.

ich sprach: „liebi fro, sagt an,
wenn nü kömt die Minne?“
si sprach: „hastü nit sinne,
ald wie ist dir beschechen?
wiltü nit minne sechen
hie uff diesem theras,
so frag nach minn nit furbaß!“

Lady Love is therefore only visible in her effects on people, but not physically present. Glier describes the text’s conception of love as a "rather indirect allegory". Richter refers to "an older conception" that defines Love as a ghostly, invisible being, as is the case, for example, in the didactic poem Die Winsbekin, in which the daughter asks her mother: nu sage mir ob diu Minne lebe / und hie bî uns ûf erde sî / od ob uns in den lüften swebe, to which the mother replies, referring to Ovid, that si vert unsictic als ein geist.

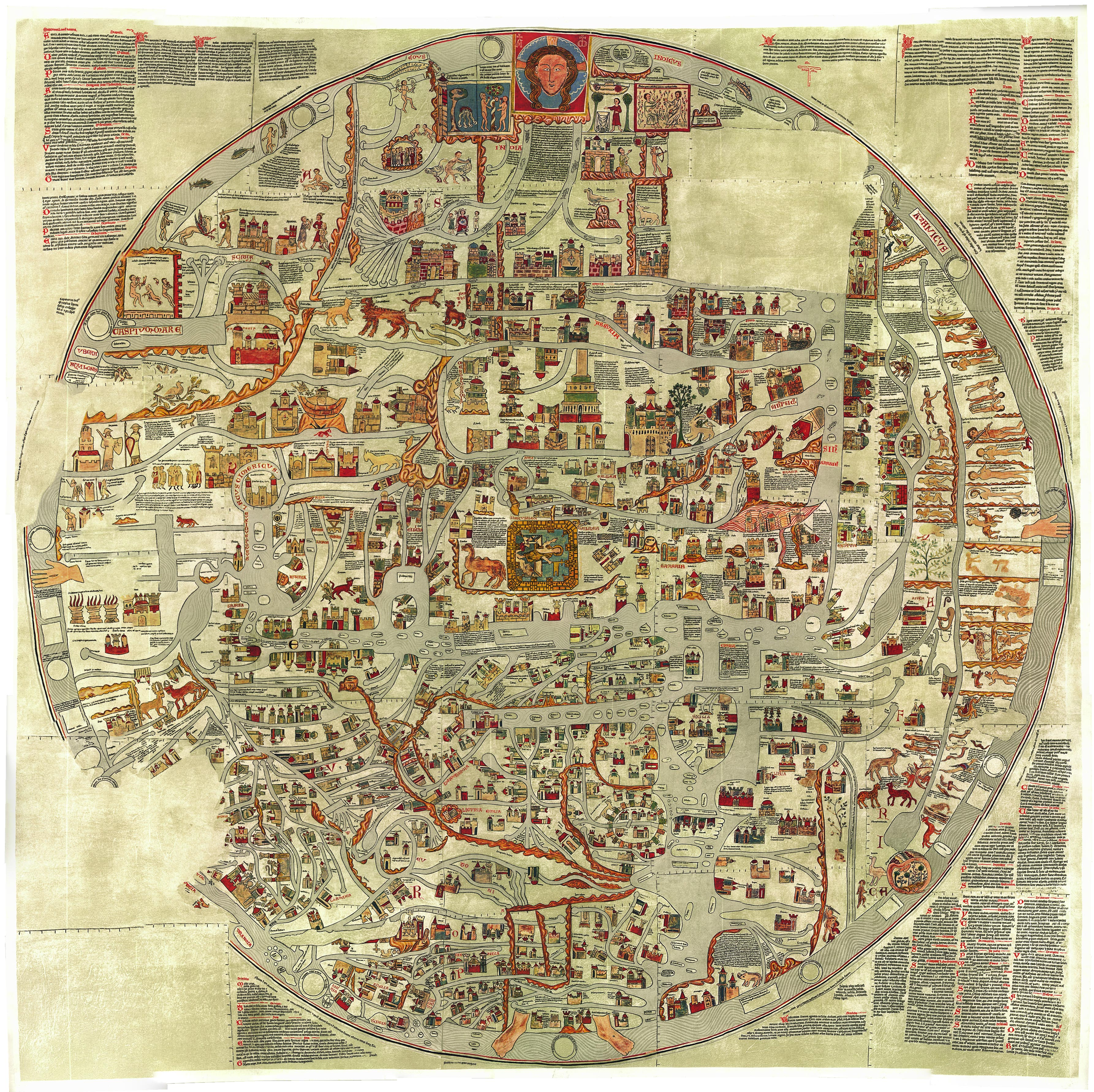
Area of the world known in the 14th century on the Ebstorf world map around 1300

The monastery building can be interpreted allegorically to some extent. It has twelve gates, each representing a month, thus creating twelve different climatic zones in the interior and vestibule of the monastery. It is circular and also so large that the number of inhabitants is infinite and a horse could not walk around the monastery in a year. Wolfgang Achnitz used this information to make the following calculation:

"If one takes this information literally and generously assumes that a horse in a hurry covers about 60 kilometers a day, depending on its gait, then the circumference of the complex is almost 22,000 kilometers, from which a diameter of about 7,000 kilometers can be calculated. This almost corresponds to the distance from the Arctic Circle to the equator or from Gibraltar in the west to India in the east, i.e. the area of the entire known orbis terrarum of the 14th century." Wolfgang Achnitz 2006

The monastery should therefore not be understood as a real building, but rather as an allegorical reference to Love's domain, which is also mentioned in the text itself: sie hat gewalt über alli lant and, with regard to the simultaneously existing seasons, also at all times. The size of the monastery and the climatic peculiarities are mentioned in the work at the beginning, "but not developed to full vividness" and no longer play a role in the further course of the plot. For Anke Roeder, The Monastery of Love can therefore be described "more as a love story than an allegory".

==== Literary models and further impact ====
The motif of the allegorical monastery can already be found in medieval Latin poetry, for example in Hugh of Fouilloy's work De claustro animae from 1160. In the third and fourth books of his treatise, the four sides of the monastery of the heavenly Jerusalem stand for the four cardinal virtues.

Andreas Capellanus' (Andreae Capellani) treatise De amore libri tres was written around 1185, in which a palatium amoris stands in the middle of the world (of the dead). This is a quadrangular palace with four gates. In the east is the god Cupid, who sends out his arrows of love. In the south are the women, who always keep their palace gate open. They are open to love because they are hit directly by Cupid's arrows. In the west, prostitutes wander around outside their palace gates, never turning anyone away, but not being hit by Cupid's arrows. In the north, the gates are locked. The women rejected love during their lifetime and were therefore condemned by Cupid.

In its design, The Monastery of Love draws on motifs from Latin poetry, but also links them with stories about the home of the goddess of love, as De monte feneris agitur hic shows with its reference to the Venusberg material. This was used in the form of the "Minnegrotte" (love grotto) in Gottfried von Strasbourg's Tristan, for example.

The Monastery of Love may have influenced the 1472 work The Secular Monastery. The love allegories attributed to Master Altswert (above all The Treasure of Virtues) also show parallels to the Monastery of Love. "But otherwise the poem - in contrast to Hadamar von Laber's allegorical love doctrine, which was written around the same time - has hardly had any discernible effect."

==== Style ====
The Monastery of Love is a "poem written in skillful verse." It is written in couplets and the verse structure is flowing. The narrative style is kept simple, with large parts of the text consisting of the narrator's conversation with the messenger of Love and his companion in the monastery. His questions are followed by the companion's explanations or the companion asks questions about the extent to which the narrator agrees with what he sees. For this purpose, formulaic phrases are used, for example, the companion's questions are regularly introduced with lieber gesell, nü sage mir ... or lieber gesell, wie gefellet dir. This structure was seen as a "convenient means of dividing chapters and structuring, especially in larger descriptive poems", but was also criticized: "Little stimulation arises from such mock dialogue."

The author makes use of rhetorical stylistic devices such as word clusters and parallelisms, but the weakness of the text is the uniformity of expression. Vocabulary of praise, used for example in the description of the monastery or the companion's chamber, is essentially limited to the words "beautiful" (schön), "precious" (kostlich) and "rich" (rich), which are used repeatedly. The description of the tournament is based on the combination of the words "run" (rennen) and "sting" (stechen). Nevertheless, Laßberg, for example, considered The Monastery of Love to be the most beautiful poem in his Liedersaal, which can be explained, among other things, by the vividness of the narrative: "Again and again, the opportunity is taken to create something unmistakable through the detailed, imaginative shaping of a scene or situation, not just to vary topoi once again." In addition, Schaus emphasizes the authenticity of the descriptions and Glier the "unusually light and varied" conversations.

== Author's question and chronological classification ==
As both the author and the date of composition are not clear from the work itself, the Minnerede The Monastery of Love offers room for interpretation and speculation. Since the "rediscovery" of the work in the course of its publication by Joseph von Laßberg, there have been repeated attempts to determine the time of composition and the author more precisely.

=== League of Lions ===
In 1895, Georg Richter dated the work to the second half of the 14th century. He saw this as proven above all by the tournament prizes, which included a lion crest with a golden chain for the best knight and a leopard with a silver chain for the best servant.[38] Richter saw this as a parallel to the League of Lions, which was founded in 1379. Every knight had to wear a golden lion and every servant a silver lion as a badge; according to a chronicle by Jakob Twinger von Königshofen from Strasbourg, it was supposed to have been either a lion or a panther made of gold or silver. A lion on a chain would also have been regarded in research as a badge of the lion society. Richter therefore considered the date of origin of the Minnerede to be after 1379, a view that is no longer shared in today's research. On the one hand, the secular knightly society of the Order of the Lion left no traces in the political sphere of the spiritual knightly order of the Monastery of Minne; on the other hand, the lion and panther are common medieval heraldic animals, so that a mere similarity of the society's insignia cannot be an indication of dependence.

=== Lament for a Noble Duchess ===
In Laßberg's Liedersaal, The Monastery of Love is immediately followed by the anonymous Minnerede Lament for a Noble Duchess. Here the poet meets a group of knights and friends who mourn the death of a Duchess of Carinthia and Tyrol, née Countess of Savoy. They remember the time when the beloved woman was still alive and describe, among other things, a tournament as it used to take place at her court. Richter and Emil Schaus saw a connection between the two descriptions of tournaments as early as the 19th century. While Richter only recognized a dependency, Schaus went so far as to assume that both works were written by the same author. In addition to the linguistic similarity of the tournament descriptions, he also saw evidence of this in the otherwise unattested word walke(n) (meaning "balcony"), which is found in both Minnereden. Ehrismann also sees an identity of authorship "proven by various literal echoes", while Niewöhner rules out an identity of authorship due to linguistic deviations and "considerable differences in verse technique and style". Although Glier also sees linguistic differences, he does not want to rule out a similarity of authorship: "The linguistic differences are not so significant. The lament for the dead is probably more clumsy stylistically, metrically and in terms of rhyme than that of the 'Monastery of Love', but it cannot be ruled out that both are works by a poet whose skill in writing has increased. " In addition, like Schaus, she sees that "the descriptions of tournaments in both poems coincide to such an extent that one must assume some kind of dependency behind them." The fact that both Minnereden were transmitted together in the Donaueschingen Codex 104 as well as in the Heidelberg Cod. pal. germ. 313 also speaks in favor of the existence of a single author.

Laßberg assumes that the deceased countess was the third wife of Henry of Carinthia, Beatrice of Savoy. As the lament reacts to the death of the lady and, according to linguistic indications, was written earlier than the Monastery of Love, this means that the Monastery of Love was written after 1331.

The author's social background could also be determined more precisely if the authors were the same. In the Lament for a Noble Duchess, the author calls himself a "junker", as in the Monastery of Love, and is a wandering singer of knightly rank. He can read and write and is a Swabian, "a traveller who seeks to console the Carinthian duke for a good reward with an allegory according to the taste of the time [...] and who at another time wants to earn the gratitude of Louis the Bavarian through a fantastic glorification of the imperial favourite creation."

=== Ettal Monastery ===
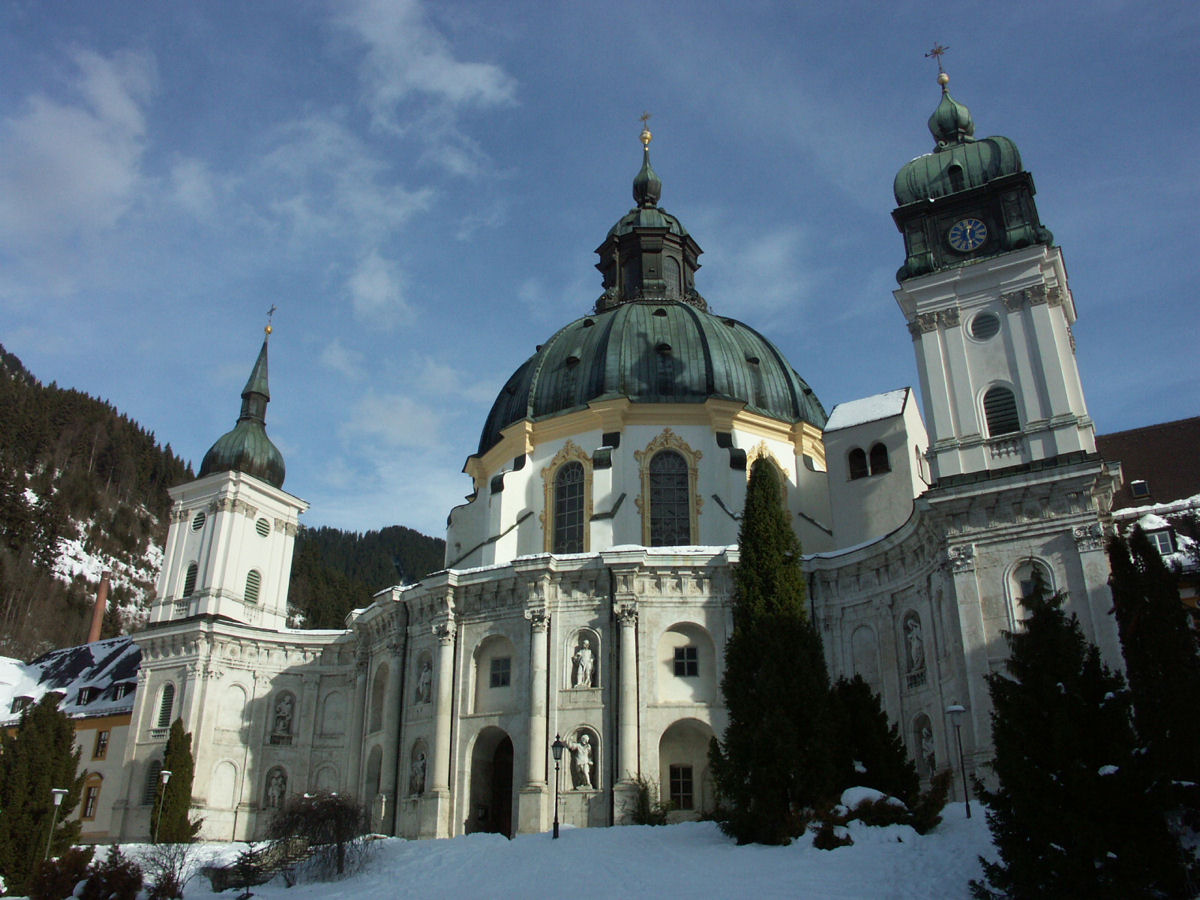
The Ettal monastery in the baroque form of the 18th century

The search for a connection between the Monastery of Love and Ettal Monastery has been very persistent in research into the date of origin, which, as Wolfgang Achnitz shows, has proved fruitless. Due to the foundation of Ettal in 1330, this would mean that the Monastery of Love was founded in the 1330s or shortly after the construction of the monastery up to 1350 at the latest.

==== The Ettal Rule ====
The Ettal Monastery was founded in 1330 and received a written code of life in 1332 with the Ettal Rule, which was written in German and defined everyday life in the monastery. In addition to priests and monks, 13 knights and their wives were to live in the monastery. If a knight died, his wife was allowed to remain in the monastery until her death. The knights and their wives were allowed to go hunting and gamble, but not for money. Dancing and excessive consumption of alcohol were also forbidden, children were not allowed to be brought into the monastery; children born in the monastery had to leave Ettal after the age of three. Clothing was to be simple and color-coded. Knights were not allowed to have their own horses, but could borrow horses from the monastery's master.

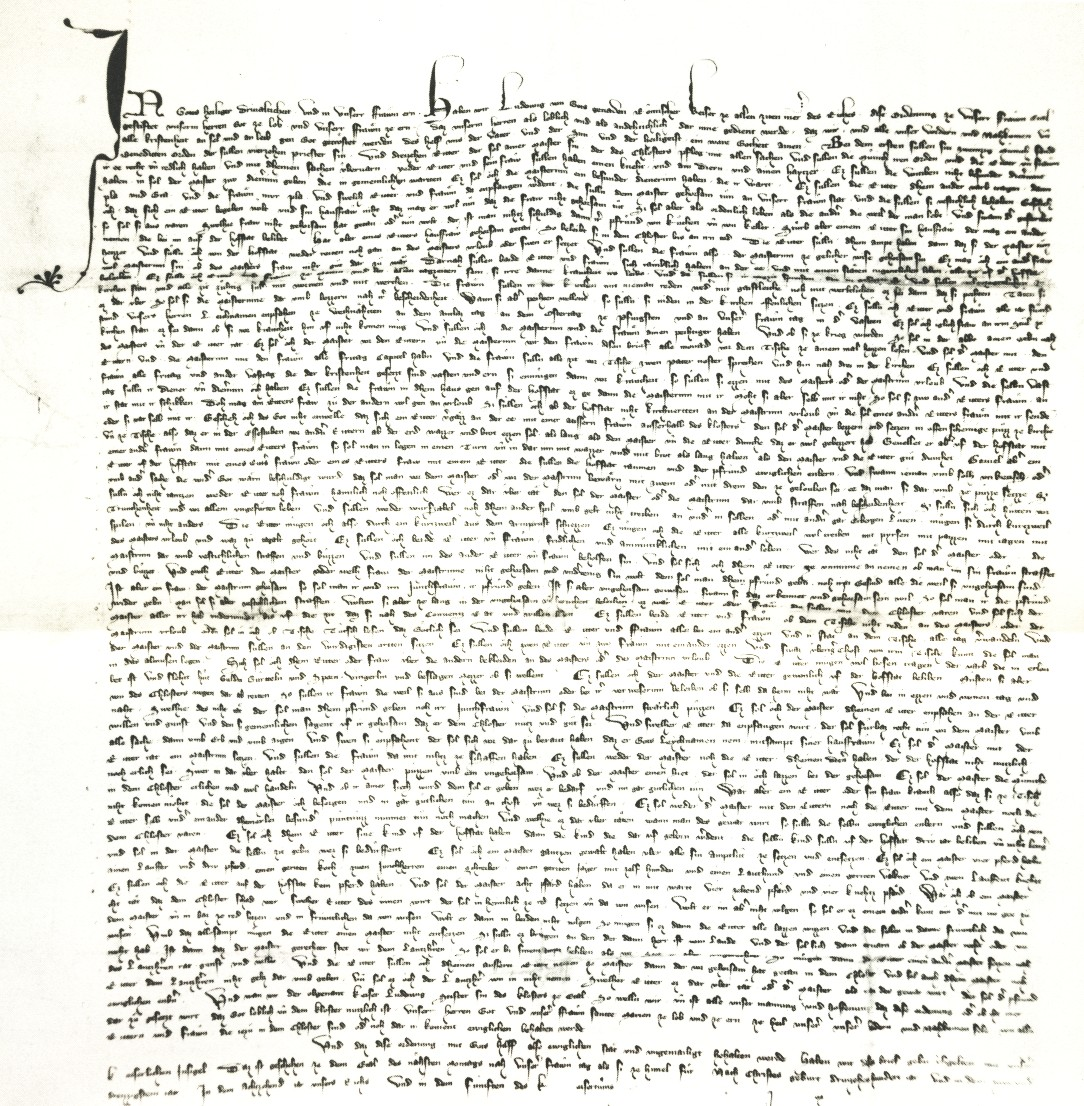
The Ettal Rule

The monastery of Love also has a "monastery rule", which runs through the text like a common thread. It is repeatedly emphasized that an inhabitant of the monastery must abide by the rules. This consists of being subject to Love and not acting contrary to it. At the same time, only those who have actually been hit by dü Minn mit ir strale can remain in the monastery. The first-person narrator thus summarizes correctly: der hat gar unrecht / er sy ritter oder knecht / der sich dez nimet an / das er nit in hertzen mag han. Only if the action is characterized by love in the broadest sense is it a good action. At the same time, unwritten rules can be recognized in everyday monastic life. The monastery residents are allowed to play for valuables, they throw dice, play mill, bowl and dance. It is up to the inhabitants to decide what clothes they wear and while the monastery rules explicitly state that hats must be simple, the first thing the narrator notices about the messenger of love is her hat, which is adorned with an ostrich feather and other ornaments. Horses are so plentiful in the monastery that they can even be lent to visitors for the tournament. Richter therefore points out that "the rule of Ettal [...] in some points [says] the exact opposite of that of the Monastery of Love". Even more than 50 years later, there is no certainty: "The model could have been the constitution that Emperor Ludwig the Bavarian gave to the knightly monastery of Ettal founded by him in 1332, but the poet certainly did not intend a realistic depiction."

==== The monastery as a knights' convent ====
In addition to a convent of monks under the direction of the abbot, Ettal Monastery also had a convent of knights led by a master and a convent of women under the direction of the mistress. At this time, Ettal Monastery was therefore more like a knights' convent with monastic forms, which also existed in the Monastery of Love. Here it says: daz ist ain raine / gesellicklichü bruderschaft. / ich wont, daz sölichü ritterschaft / in dekainem closter möchte sin. Research has also seen this connection: "Ettal offered him [the author] the idea of the chivalric monastery, he worked it out roughly" by, for example, turning the master and the mistress into an abbot and an abbess and a prior and a prioress. As the author's intention was not a realistic depiction of the Ettal monastery, the joys of such a life were emphasized and the inhabitants of the monastery were allowed to dance, play and fight in tournaments.

==== The monastery building ====
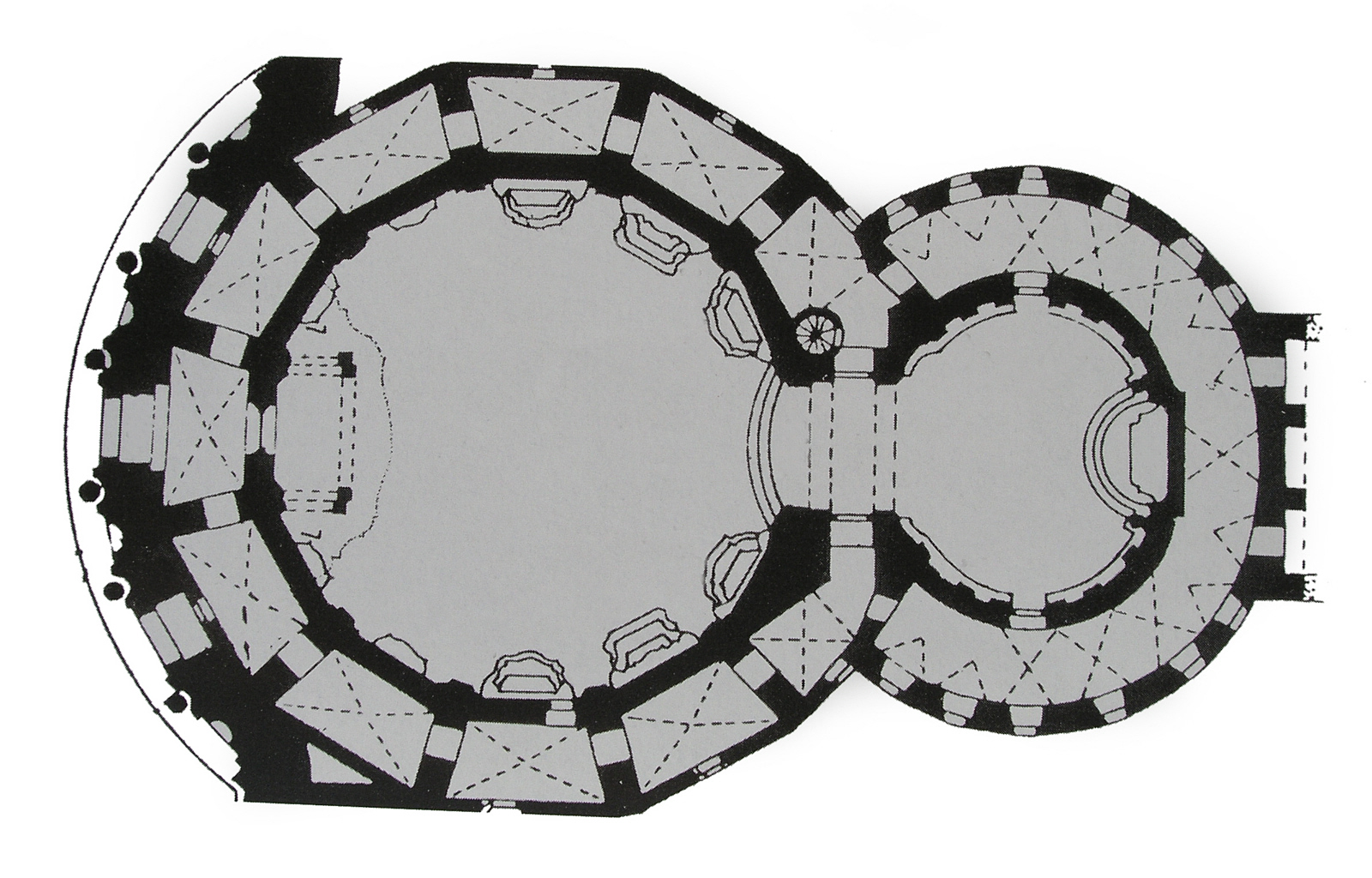
Twelve-sided ground plan of the foundation building from 1330 (left section).

Ettal Monastery was originally a dodecagonal Gothic central building, which was only extended by numerous annexes over the centuries. According to Schaus, the unusual shape could have given the author the idea of a belt of months, which he transferred to the Monastery of Love. Although the monastery building of the Minnerede is round, it has twelve gates, each representing a month and creating twelve different climatic zones in the monastery interior and anteroom.

== The monastery of Minne - an upside-down world ==
In comparison with other Minnereden or with details of the rules of the order and the building of the Ettal monastery, the search for a coherent overall concept of The Monastery of Love quickly reveals inconsistencies and breaks that prevent a conclusive assessment.

But as soon as one stops taking the text seriously, it proves to be a rare gem of parodic literature: In a reversal of classical material and motifs from heroic epic and love poetry, a hero appears in The Monastery of Love who believes he is doing everything right and stumbles from one blunder to the next - a Don Quixote avant la lettre.

== Current research status ==
In 2006, Wolfgang Achnitz discussed previous research on the Monastery of Love in the area of chronological classification through connections between the Monastery of Love and the Ettal Monastery or the League of Lions and summarized his findings:

"In any case, the result is that dependencies, which would in any case only be of significance for an exact dating of the Minne narrative, cannot be proven, since parallels can be discovered to almost all the rules prevailing in the Monastery of Love in the statutes of the great orders of chivalry (Knights of St. John, Knights Templar, Teutonic Knights) as well as in the literature of the preceding period. The same applies to the tournament awards, which were often used in a similar form at tournaments and festivals of the knightly societies in the 14th century." - Wolfgang Achnitz, 2006

== Editions ==
- Joseph von Laßberg (ed.): Lieder Saal. Das ist Sammelung altteutscher Gedichte aus ungedrukten Quellen. Vol 2. o. A. 1822, pp. 209–264. (Reprint by Scheitlin and Zollikofer, St. Gallen 1846, Neudruck Darmstadt 1968)
- Maria Schierling: "Das Kloster der Minne“. Edition und Untersuchung. Kümmerle, Göppingen 1980, ISBN 3-87452-356-X
- Paula Hefti (ed.): Der Codex Dresden M 68. Edition einer spätmittelalterlichen Sammelhandschrift. Francke, Bern and Munich 1980, ISBN 3-7720-1326-0

== Bibliography ==
- Emil Schaus: Das Kloster der Minne. In: ZfdA 38, 1894, pp. 361–368.
- Georg Richter: Beträge zur Interpretation und Textrekonstruktion des mittelhochdeutschen Gedichtes „Kloster der Minne“. Bernhard Paul, Berlin 1895.
- Kurt Matthaei: Das „Weltliche Klösterlein“ und die deutsche Minne-Allegorie. Univ. Diss., Marburg 1907.
- Gustav Ehrismann: Geschichte der deutschen Literatur bis zum Ausgang des Mittelalters. Vol 2: Die mittelhochdeutsche Literatur. Beck, Munich 1935, pp. 504–506.
- Heinrich Niewöhner: Das Kloster der Minne. In: Wolfgang Stammler, Karl Langosch (eds.): Die deutsche Literatur des Mittelalters. Verfasserlexikon. Vol3. De Gruyter, Berlin 1943, pp. 395–403.
- Heinrich Niewöhner: Minnereden und -allegorien. In: Wolfgang Stammler, Karl Langosch (eds.): Die deutsche Literatur des Mittelalters. Verfasserlexikon. Vol 3. De Gruyter, Berlin 1943, pp. 404–424.
- Anke Roeder: Das Kloster der Minne. In: Gert Woerner (ed.): Kindlers Literatur Lexikon. Vol 4. Zürich, Kindler 1968, p. 574f.
- Tilo Brandis: Mittelhochdeutsche, mittelniederdeutsche und mittelniederländische Minnereden. Verzeichnis der Handschriften und Drucke. Beck, Munich 1968, p. 170.
- Walter Blank: Die deutsche Minneallegorie. Metzler, Stuttgart 1970, p. 162–172.
- Ingeborg Glier (ed.): Artes amandi. Untersuchung zur Geschichte, Überlieferung und Typologie der deutschen Minnereden. Beck, Munich 1971, ISBN 3-406-02834-9, pp. 178–184.
- Ingeborg Glier: Kloster der Minne. In: Kurt Ruh (ed.): Die deutsche Literatur des Mittelalters. Verfasserlexikon. Vol 4. 2. completely revised edition. de Gruyter, Berlin 1983, ISBN 3-11-008838-X, pp. 1235-1238.
- Sabine Heimann: Das Kloster der Minne. In: Rolf Bräuer (ed.): Dichtung des europäischen Mittelalters. Beck, Munich 1991, ISBN 3-406-34563-8, p. 501f.
- Astrid Wenninger: War Don Quijotes Urahn ein Bayer? Über einen literatur-archäologischen Fund im Kloster der Minne. In: Jahrbuch der Oswald von Wolkenstein Gesellschaft. 15, 2005, ISSN 0722-4311, pp. 251–265.
- Jacob Klingner, Ludger Lieb: Flucht aus der Burg. Überlegungen zur Spannung zwischen institutionellem Raum und kommunikativer Offenheit in den Minnereden. In: Ricarda Bauschke (ed.): Die Burg im Minnesang und als Allegorie im deutschen Mittelalter. Lang, Frankfurt am Main 2006, ISBN 3-631-51164-7, p. 156ff.
- Wolfgang Achnitz: „De monte feneris agitur hic“. Liebe als symbolischer Code und als Affekt im Kloster der Minne. In: Ricarda Bauschke (ed.): Die Burg im Minnesang und als Allegorie im deutschen Mittelalter. Lang, Frankfurt am Main 2006, ISBN 3-631-51164-7, pp. 161–186.
