= Laaber =

- Municipality
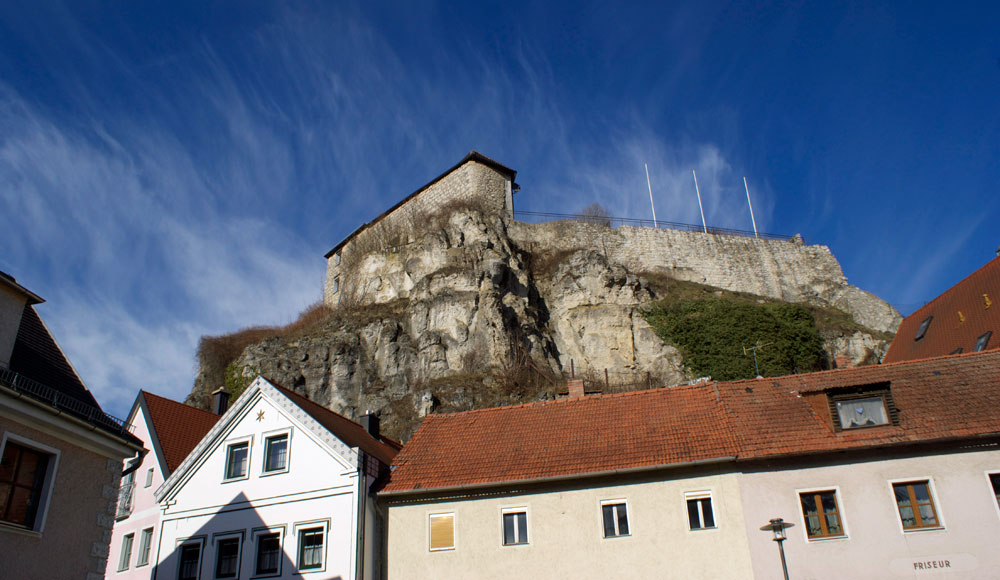
- Laaber Castle ruins

- Coat of arms

- Location of Laaber within Regensburg district
- Interactive map of Laaber
- Location within Germany Location within Bavaria
- Coordinates: 49°03′55″N 11°53′10″E
- Country: Germany
- State: Bavaria
- Admin. region: Oberpfalz
- District: Regensburg
- Municipal assoc.: Laaber
- Subdivisions: 32 Ortsteile

Government
  - Mayor (2020–26): Hans Schmid (CSU)

Area
  - Total: 29.66 km^{2} (11.45 sq mi)
- Elevation: 402 m (1,319 ft)

Population (2025-12-31)
  - Total: 5,321
  - Density: 179.4/km^{2} (464.6/sq mi)
- Time zone: UTC+01:00 (CET)
  - Summer (DST): UTC+02:00 (CEST)
- Postal codes: 93164
- Dialling codes: 09498
- Vehicle registration: R
- Website: www.markt-laaber.de

Laaber (German pronunciation: [ˈlaːbɐ]) is a municipality in the district of Regensburg in Bavaria in Germany. It lies on the River Schwarze Laber (note the spelling difference).

The now-ruined medieval castle on the hill above the town centre was once the seat of the Lords of Laber, who were influential in the 14th and 15th centuries. Hadamar II of Laber was mayor of Regensburg in 1334, and Ulrich of Laber was mayor of Nuremberg in 1366. The dynasty had some importance as patrons of cultural activities. They contributed financially to the construction of the Scots Monastery in Regensburg, and are recorded as being enthusiastic supporters of jousting events. Hadamar III was a courtly poet (Minnesänger), famous particularly for his poem "Die Jagd" ('the hunt'). The Lords of Laber also owned the castle at Wolfsegg. The House of Laber died out in 1475, with the death of Hadamar VII.
