= Minnerede =

Form of late medieval rhyming speech

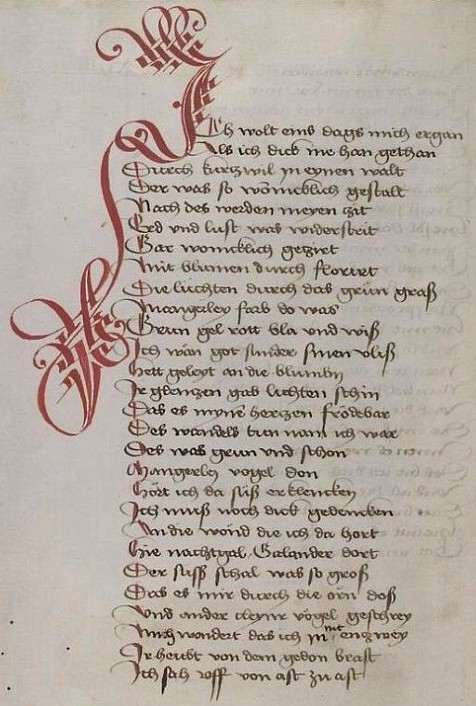
Beginning of the Minnerede The Monastery of Minne in the Codex pal. German 313.

The Minnerede is a form of late medieval rhyming speech. In contrast to the shorter Minnelieder in canzonal form, it was not sung but spoken. Most of the texts have only a few hundred verses, the Minnereden, which is assigned to around 600 texts in German studies, but also extensive texts (so-called large forms) such as 'Die Minneburg', 'Die Minnelehre' by Johann von Konstanz, 'The Hunt' by Hadamar von Laber and 'Mörin' by Hermann von Sachsenheim counted. The rhyming couplet verse is predominant, but there are also some strophic minnereden. Many Minnereden are reflections on courtly love (German: Minne) held in first-person form or narratives of allegorical events and dreams, the focus of which is the unfulfilled desire of the Minnenden.

== Background ==
The oldest surviving testimony is Hartmann von Aue's booklet Klagebüchlein (also called complaint or lawsuit booklet, around 1200). The heyday of the Minnereden - both in terms of production and reception - was in the 14th and 15th centuries. Most of the texts have been handed down anonymously, but authors such as Meister Altswert, Heinrich der Teichner, Peter Suchenwirt and Hans Folz also appear. Only a few Minereda were printed in the 15th and 16th centuries.

Different types of Minnerede are distinguished, for example the praise of the beloved type, to which the Minnereden Dis is the beauty of the frowen written in the 15th century, which above all describes a beautiful woman's body beginning with the head and ending at the feet, as well as beauty award belong. Die Graserin (English: The Grazer) is one of the coarse-obscene varieties of the genus.

== Publications ==
- Mittelhochdeutsche Minnereden I. Die Heidelberger Handschriften 344, 358, 376 und 393, hg. von Kurt Matthaei, Berlin 1913 (DTM 24)
- Mittelhochdeutsche Minnereden II. Die Heidelberger Handschriften 313 und 355; die Berliner Handschrift Ms. Germ. Fol. 922, hg. von Wilhelm Brauns, Berlin 1938 (DTM 41). - Neudruck in einem Band mit einem Nachwort von Ingeborg Glier, Dublin / Zürich 1967 (Online-Version)
- Michael Mareiner: Mittelhochdeutsche Minnereden und Minneallegorien der Wiener Handschrift 2796 und der Heidelberger Handschrift Pal. germ 348. Bern 1984.
- Michael Mareiner: Mittelhochdeutsche Minnereden und Minneallegorien der Prager Handschrift R VI Fc 26. Bern 1998
- Minnereden. Auswahledition, hg. v. Julia-Emilia Dorobanțu, Jacob Klingner, Ludger Lieb, Berlin / Boston 2017, ISBN 978-3-11-046431-3 (Open Access)

== Literature ==
- Tilo Brandis: Mittelhochdeutsche, mittelniederdeutsche und mittelniederländische Minnereden. Verzeichnis der Handschriften und Drucke. München 1968.
- Ingeborg Glier: Artes amandi. Untersuchung zu Geschichte, Überlieferung und Typologie der deutschen Minnereden. München 1971. ISBN 3-406-02834-9.
- Melitta Rheinheimer: Rheinische MInnereden. Untersuchungen und Edition (Göppinger Arbeiten zur Germanistik 144), Göppingen 1975
- Ronald Michael Schmidt: Studien zur deutschen Minnerede. Untersuchungen zu Zilies von Sayn, Johann von Konstanz und Eberhard von Cersne. Göppingen 1982. ISBN 3-87452-553-8
- Wolfgang Achnitz: Minnereden, in: Forschungsberichte zur Internationalen Germanistik. Germanistische Mediävistik, Teil 2, hg. von Hans-Jochen Schiewer unter Mitarbeit von Jochen Conzelmann. Bern u. a. 2003 (Jahrbuch für Internationale Germanistik. Reihe C: Forschungsberichte 6), S. 197–255
- Triviale Minne? Konventionalität und Trivialisierung in spätmittelalterlichen Minnereden, hg. v. Ludger Lieb und Otto Neudeck, Berlin / New York 2006, ISBN 978-3-11-018991-9
- Jacob Klingner: Minnereden im Druck. Studien zur Gattungsgeschichte im Zeitalter des Medienwechsels (Philologische Studien und Quellen 226), Berlin 2010, ISBN 978-3-503-12242-4
- Susanne Uhl: Der Erzählraum als Reflexionsraum. Eine Untersuchung zur 'Minnelehre' des Johann von Konstanz und weiteren deutschen Minnereden, Bern u. a. 2010 ISBN 978-3-034-30400-9
- Jacob Klingner, Ludger Lieb: Handbuch Minnereden. 2 Bände, Berlin / Boston. 2013. ISBN 978-3-11-018332-0
