= Johann Andreas Schmeller =

German philologist (1785–1852)

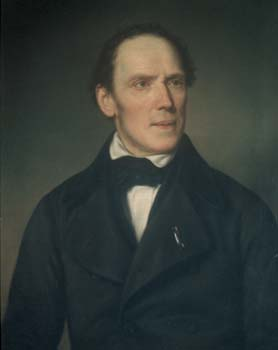
Johann Andreas Schmeller

Johann Andreas Schmeller (6 August 1785 in Tirschenreuth – 27 September 1852 in Munich) was a German philologist who initially studied the Bavarian dialect. From 1828 until his death he taught at the Ludwig-Maximilians-Universität München (LMU). He is considered the founder of modern dialect research in Germany. His lasting contribution is the four-volume Bayerisches Wörterbuch (Bavarian Dictionary), which is currently in the process of revision by the Bavarian Academy of Sciences and Humanities.

== Biography ==
In 1821, he published Die Mundarten Bayerns (Bavarian dialects). This was later supplemented by his Bayerisches Wörterbuch (Bavarian dictionary), which appeared in four volumes from 1827 to 1837. Perhaps his most notable publication was the first modern edition of the Heliand (1830).

He was also the compiler of the Carmina Burana (1847), which he named. Schmeller edited the Old High German Evangelienharmonie (1841); the Muspilli (1832); Lateinische Gedichte des 10. und 11. Jahrhunderts (1836); and Hadamar von Laber's Jagd (1850). His Cimbrisches Wörterbuch was edited by Joseph Bergmann in 1855.

Schmeller invented the schwa symbol (ə) for use as the reduced vowel at the end of some German words, and first used it in his 1820s works on the Bavarian dialects.
