= Laaber (Verwaltungsgemeinschaft) =

- Verwaltungsgemeinschaft
- Location of Laaber within Regensburg district
- Interactive map of Laaber
- Location within Germany Location within Bavaria
- Coordinates: 49°04′N 11°53′E
- Country: Germany
- State: Bavaria
- Admin. region: Upper Palatinate
- District: Regensburg
- Seat: Laaber
- Subdivisions: 3 municipalities

Area
  - Total: 52.89 km^{2} (20.42 sq mi)

Population (2025-12-31)
  - Total: 8,974
  - Density: 169.7/km^{2} (439.5/sq mi)
- Time zone: UTC+01:00 (CET)
  - Summer (DST): UTC+02:00 (CEST)
- Website: www.vg-laaber.de

Laaber is a Verwaltungsgemeinschaft (municipal association) in the district of Regensburg in Bavaria, Germany. Its seat is in Laaber.

It consists of the following municipalities:

1. Brunn
2. Deuerling
3. Laaber
