= Deuerling =

- Municipality
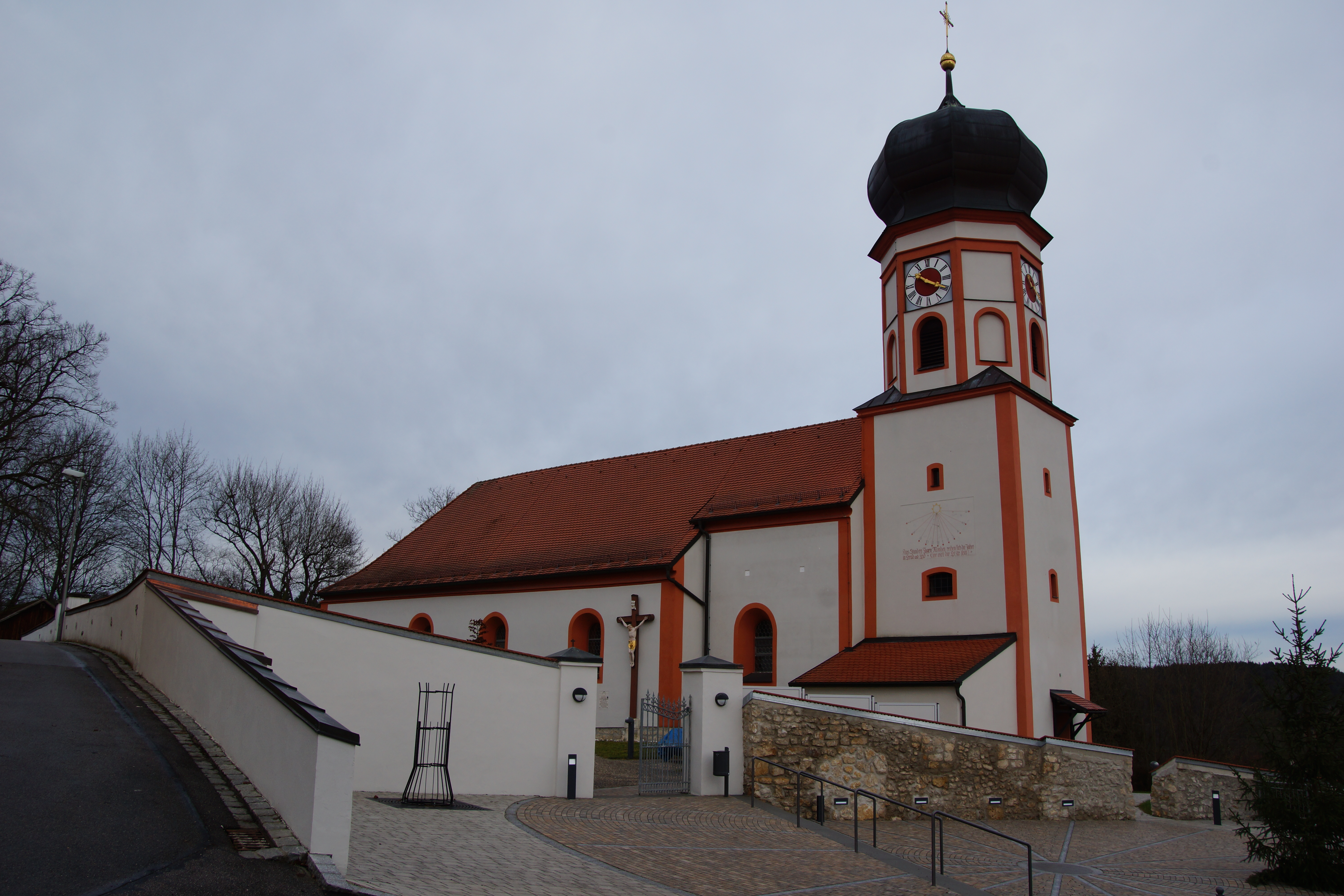
- Church of Saint Martin

- Coat of arms

- Location of Deuerling within Regensburg district
- Interactive map of Deuerling
- Location within Germany Location within Bavaria
- Coordinates: 49°2′10″N 11°54′27″E
- Country: Germany
- State: Bavaria
- Admin. region: Oberpfalz
- District: Regensburg
- Municipal assoc.: Laaber
- Subdivisions: 6 Ortsteile

Government
  - Mayor (2020–26): Diethard Eichhammer (SPD)

Area
  - Total: 7.11 km^{2} (2.75 sq mi)
- Elevation: 417 m (1,368 ft)

Population (2025-12-31)
  - Total: 1,981
  - Density: 279/km^{2} (722/sq mi)
- Time zone: UTC+01:00 (CET)
  - Summer (DST): UTC+02:00 (CEST)
- Postal codes: 93180
- Dialling codes: 09498
- Vehicle registration: R
- Website: www.gemeinde-deuerling.de

Deuerling (German pronunciation: [ˈdɔʏɐlɪŋ]) is a municipality in the district of Regensburg in Bavaria in Germany.

== History ==
On 24 April 1945, Lieutenant Colonel David H. Arp from Major General Stanley Eric Reinhart's Headquarters Staff searched for a location to set up the Division Command Post from which the assault crossing of the Danube River can be properly supervised and coordinated. He chose Deuerling. The crossing was accomplished in record time.

== Weather ==
The average high temperature in Deuerling is 63 degrees Fahrenheit and the average low temperature is 45 degrees Fahrenheit.
