= Brunn, Upper Palatinate =

Brunn
- Municipality
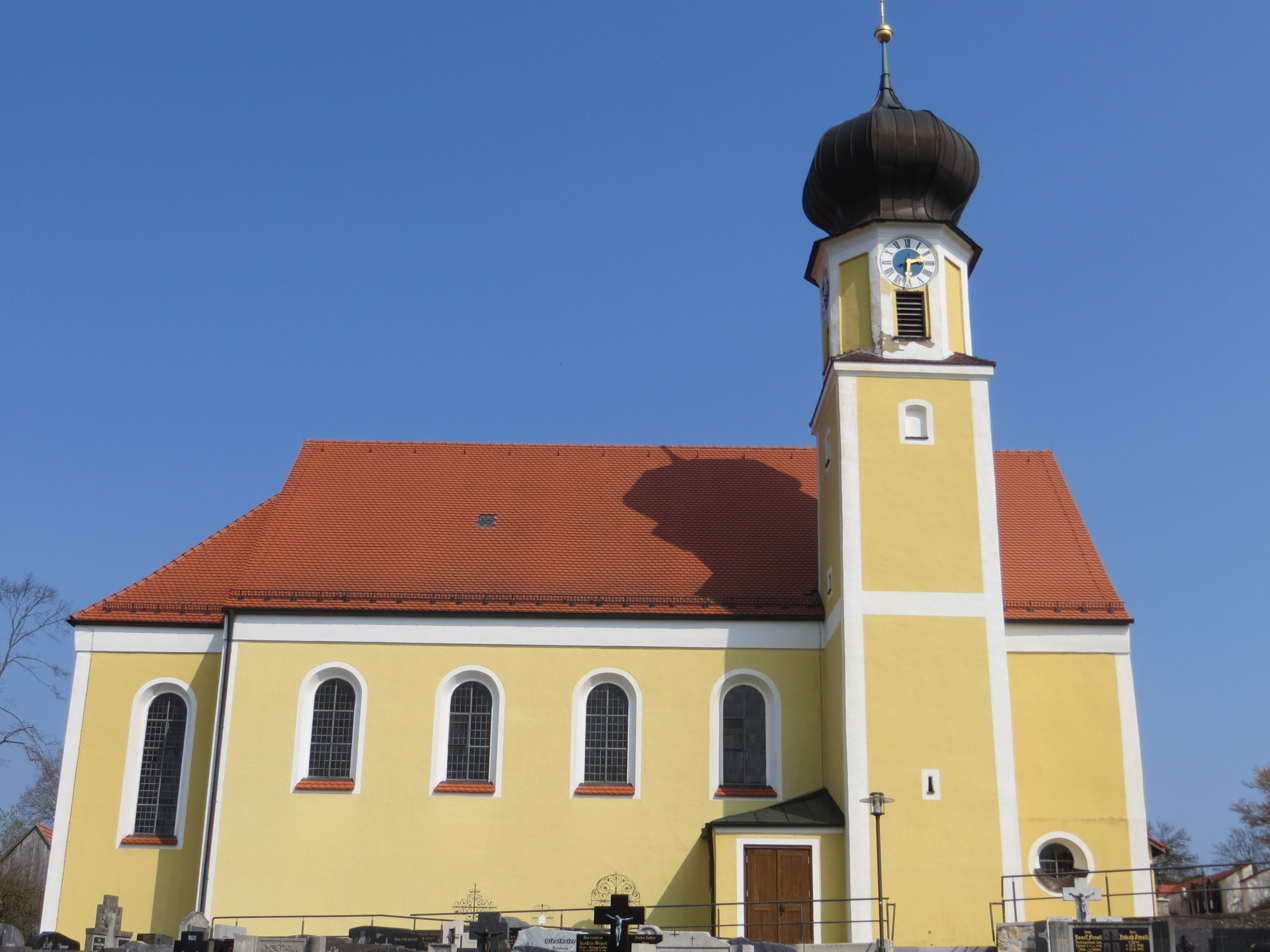
- Church of the Nativity of the Virgin Mary in Frauenberg

- Coat of arms

- Location of Brunn within Regensburg district
- Interactive map of Brunn
- Location within Germany Location within Bavaria
- Coordinates: 49°5′43″N 11°53′50″E
- Country: Germany
- State: Bavaria
- Admin. region: Oberpfalz
- District: Regensburg
- Municipal assoc.: Laaber
- Subdivisions: 8 Ortsteile

Government
  - Mayor (2020–26): Karl Söllner (SPD)

Area
  - Total: 16.12 km^{2} (6.22 sq mi)
- Elevation: 470 m (1,540 ft)

Population (2025-12-31)
  - Total: 1,672
  - Density: 103.7/km^{2} (268.6/sq mi)
- Time zone: UTC+01:00 (CET)
  - Summer (DST): UTC+02:00 (CEST)
- Postal codes: 93164
- Dialling codes: 09498
- Vehicle registration: R
- Website: www.gemeinde-brunn.de

Brunn (German pronunciation: [bʁʊn]) is a municipality in the Upper Palatinate (Oberpfalz) in the administrative district Landkreis Regensburg.
