= Hadamar III of Laber =

Hadamar III of Laber (c. 1300 – 1360) was one of the Lords of Laber (now Laaber) in the Upper Palatinate, and an important courtly poet (Minnesänger).

He is famous mainly for his allegorical poem "Die Jagd" (the hunt), written in Middle High German.
