= Chapel of St. Roch, Vienna =

Chapel in Vienna, Austria

Chapel of St. Roch
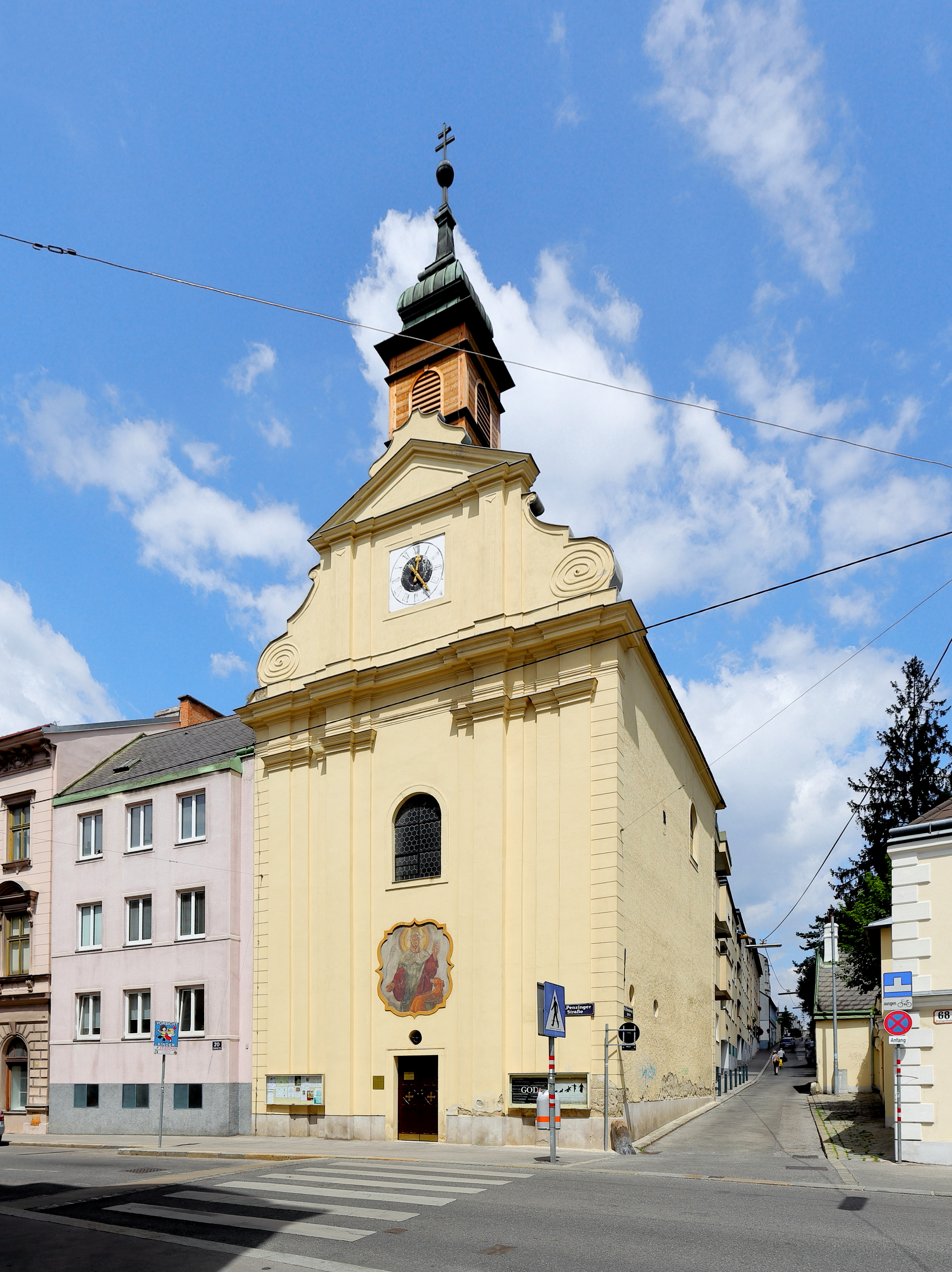
- St. Roch's chapel in 2016
- Chapel of St. Roch
- 48°11′23.7″N 16°18′19.5″E
- Address: Penzinger Street 70, Vienna
- Country: Austria
- Denomination: Chapel

History
- Founded: 1660
- Founder: Georg Einwang

Architecture
- Architect: Georg Gerstenbrand
- Style: Classicism
- Completed: 1660/1845
- Demolished: 1683 (rebuilt 1841–1845)

Administration
- Archdiocese: Vienna
- Parish: Penzing

The Chapel of St. Roch is a Catholic chapel in Penzing at Penzinger Street 70, Austria. The chapel is dedicated to the two plague saints, Roch and Sebastian.

== Description ==
The plan of the chapel room is a Greek cross with shallow cross arms and projecting gallery bay. However, the room is set in a closed rectangle, so that the exterior does not allow any conclusion to be drawn about the interior. This concept was also used for the Leopoldsberg church. The interior is relatively high in relation to its length.

The high façade is in Classicist style and runs out in large volutes above the cornice. There is a clock in the centre of the gable. The ridge turret is decorated with a tin bonnet. Above the entrance is a mural depicting St. Roch.

The high altar with a crucifixion group in the centre dates from 1739 and is entirely painted except for the tabernacle and the cross with the figure of Christ. Above it, the eye of God is depicted in a golden halo. The side altarpiece is a work from 1844 by the painter Johann Höfel.

The parapet organ dates from 1794 and is the work of Joseph Effinger (died 1809), an organ builder from Bratislava.

== History ==
The chapel was built at the instigation of parish priest Georg Einwang by master builder Georg Gerstenbrand in 1660. During the Turkish siege of 1683, the Roch's Chapel was destroyed, but later rebuilt. In the 18th century, the Viennese merchants Johann Perinet and Johann Nikola had the dilapidated chapel renovated, and a new renovation took place from 1842 to 1845. In 1912, Adolf Hitler painted the chapel.

== Parish ==
The chapel belongs to the Roman Catholic Parish Penzing St.Jakob of the Archdiocese of Vienna. Since 1995, it has been home to the Vienna parish of the Romanian Greek Catholic Church, which belongs to the joint Ordinariate for Byzantine-Rite Catholics in Austria.

== Depictions ==
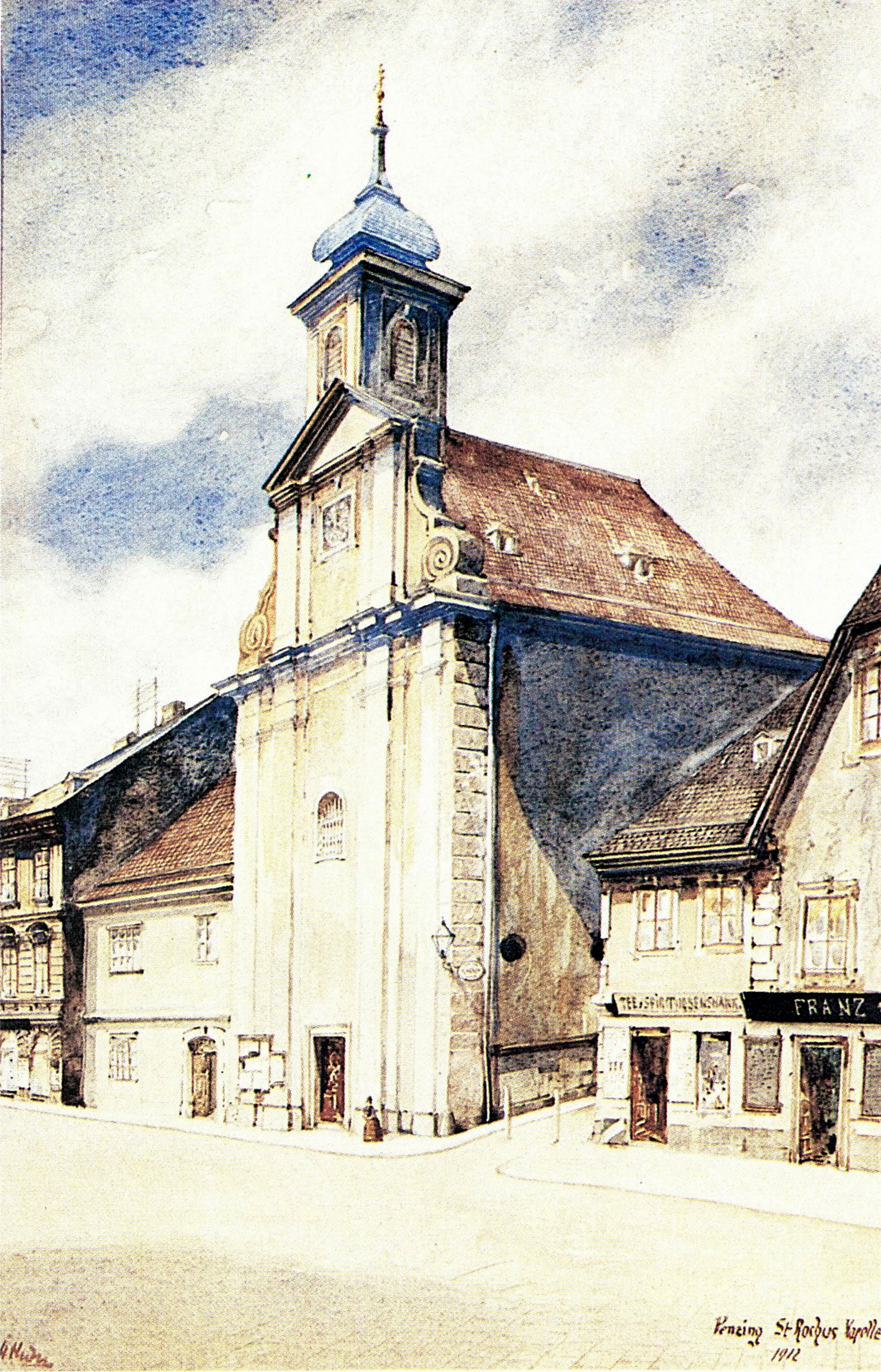
Adolf Hitler's painting of the St. Roch's chapel made in 1912

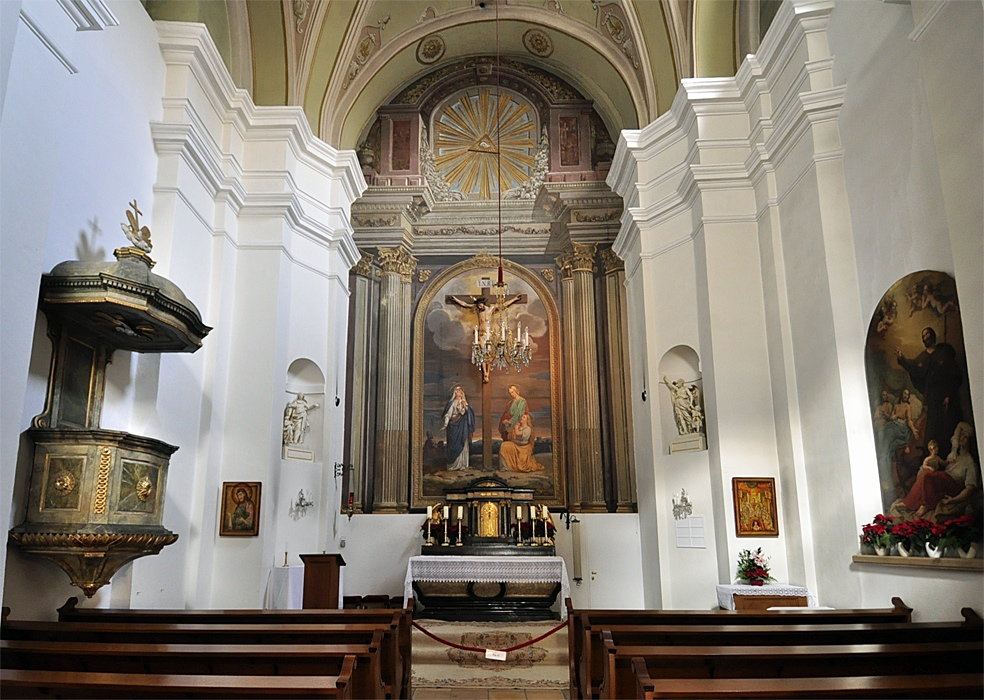
Interior view of the chapel

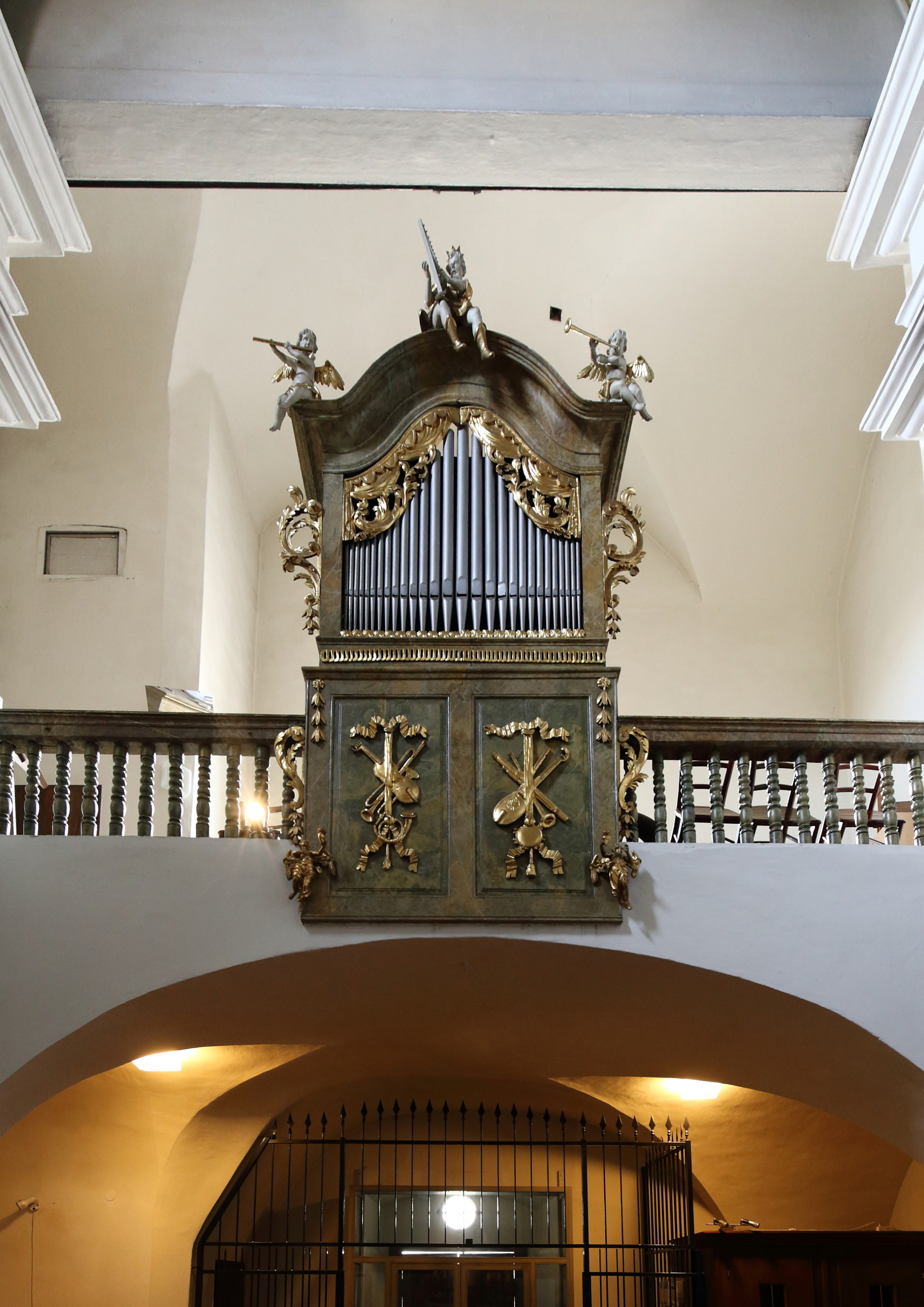
The chapel's parapet organ (Brüstungsorgel)

== See also ==
- St. Roch
- Penzing (Vienna)
- Paintings by Adolf Hitler
