= Parapet organ =

Keyboard instrument

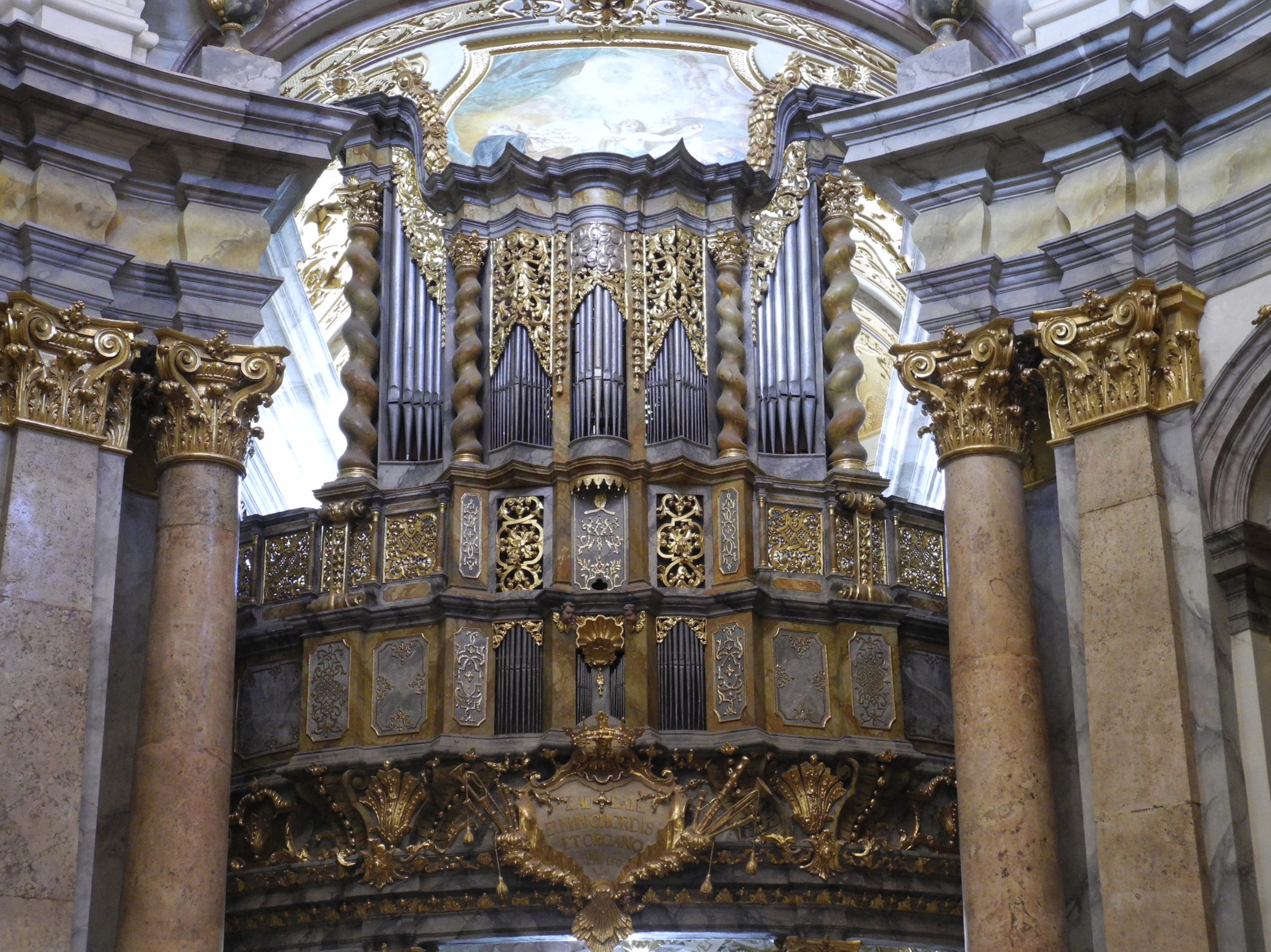
Organ of the monastery church of Weltenburg Abbey, designed as a parapet organ

A parapet organ, (German: Brüstungsorgel), is a small or medium-sized independent organ that forms a unit with the parapet of the organ loft.

== Definition ==
A Rückpositiv is often found on these organs but it is only part of an organ and therefore does not fall under the term "parapet organ" in the narrower sense, although it is still commonly referred to as such in some regions.

== History and features ==
Parapet organs are often found in Baroque style monastery churchs, where the music gallery also contains the function of the "prayer choir". This is the place where the Liturgy of the Hours is performed. The organ stands directly on the gallery parapet and it is therefore either "rear-playing", i.e. the organ console is on the rear wall of the organ, or "side-playing", i.e. the console is on one side of the organ. The organ case is usually artistically designed to match the interior. Occasionally, a second, somewhat simpler facade was built on the side of the prayer choir. The organ can thus fulfil a double function.

In other churches, this type of construction was also chosen for very shallow or very deep galleries. This placement always favours a good sound radiation of a small instrument into the church space.

== Disadvantages ==
The view and sound of an ensemble playing music towards the church interior is sometimes significantly restricted. It is difficult for the organists to follow what is going on in the service when playing from behind. Occasionally there are small shafts towards the altar to allow visual contact at all. Furthermore, the size of a parapet organ, especially with an opulent disposition, is clearly limited by the scarce space available and comprises a maximum of two manuals.

== Parapet organs (selection) ==
Place	building	picture	Organ builder	Year
Blankenhagen	Blankenhagen church		Arp Schnitger	1686
Campen	Old Church of Campen		Paul Ott	1948
Eenum, Eemsdelta	Eenum Church		Arp Schnitger	1704
Frauenzell Abbey	Frauenzell Abbey		Armin Ziegltrum	1752
Korschenbroich	St. Marien Church		Romanus Seifert & Sohn	2003
Regensburg	Holy Cross Monastery Church		Georg Jann	1978
Vals	Pilgrimage Chapel of St. Maria		Unknown	1766
Weltenburg	Weltenburg Monastery Church		Johann Konrad Brandenstein	1728
Vienna	Chapel of St. Roch		Joseph Effinger	1794
Deutschlandsberg	Parish Church of St. Oswald		Friedrich Werner	1879

== Recommended reading ==
- Georg Brenninger: Orgeln in Altbayern. GeraNova Bruckmann, 1982, ISBN 3-7654-1859-5.
