= Antonio Beduzzi =

Italian painter

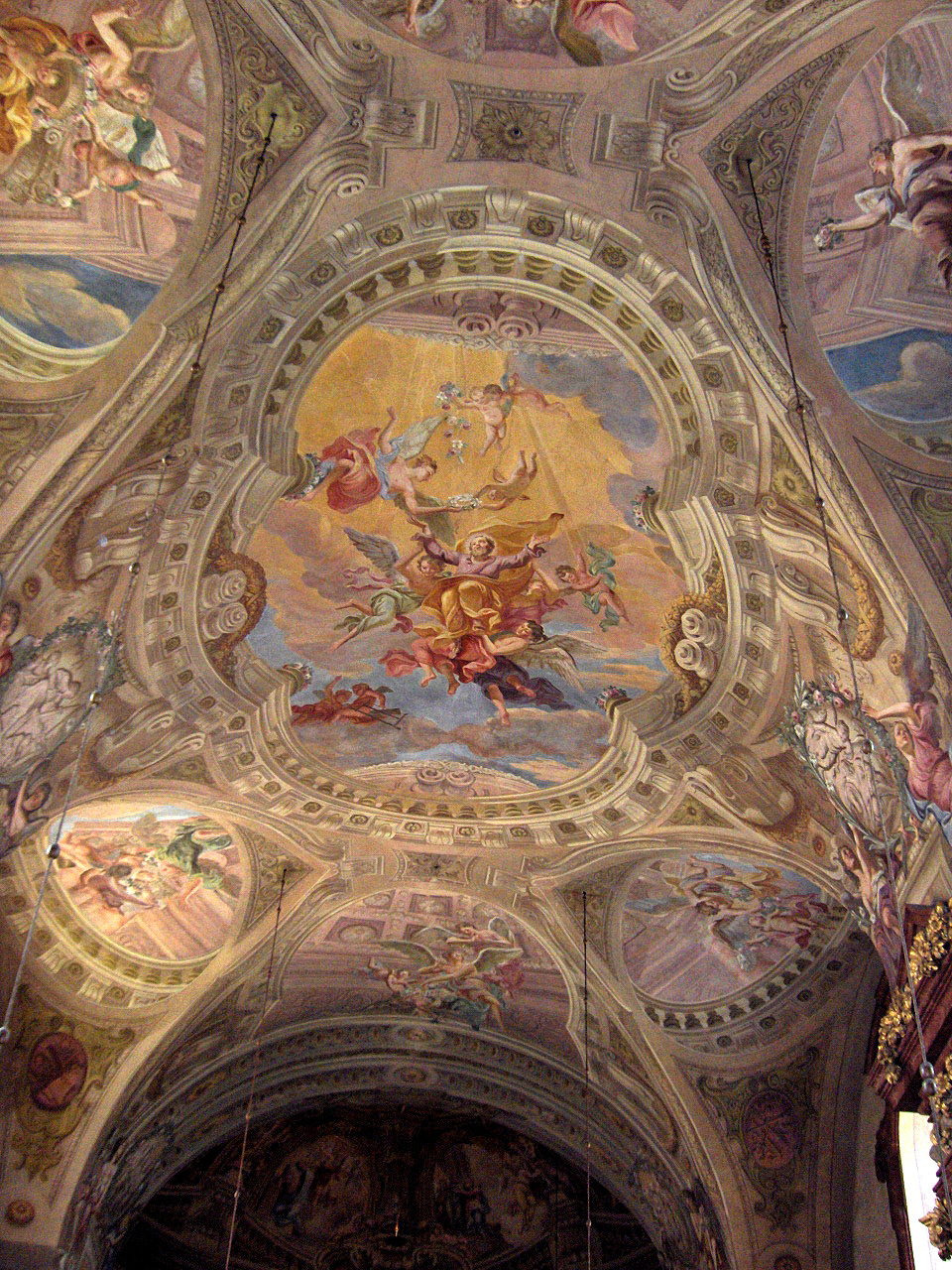
- Ascension of Joseph to Heaven, Maria Taferl church
- Born: 1675; Bologna, Romagna, Papal States (modern Bologna, Emilia-Romagna, Italy)
- Died: 4 March 1735 (aged 59–60); Vienna, Archduchy of Austria (modern Vienna, Austria)
- Education: Giovanni Gioseffo dal Sole
- Occupation: Painter
- Movement: Baroque

Antonio Maria Nicolao Beduzzi (1675 – 4 March 1735) was an Italian theater engineer, painter, and architect who flourished in Vienna in the early 18th century.

== Biography ==
=== Early career ===
Antonio Beduzzi was born in Bologna in 1675. He trained as a quadratura painter in Bologna, where he was a pupil of Giovanni Gioseffo dal Sole and became a member of the Accademia Clementina. He was recorded as working as a figure and quadratura painter in Vienna for Prince Montecuccoli in 1695, and shortly afterwards for Count Heřman Jakub Czernin in both Vienna and Prague. He soon became a project designer, when his responsibilities expanded to include architecture.

=== Work in Austria ===
Beduzzi’s first project was probably the design of furnishings for the summer sacristy of Melk Abbey Church (from 1701), which matched the European High Baroque style of the building. Later he designed furnishings and frescoes for the abbey church itself (1711–22) although, contrary to common belief, he did not design the high altar and doorway. He initially painted his frescoes himself, but later these were entrusted to his associates, as in the case of the pilgrimage church of Maria Taferl, near Melk, or to specialists employed by those commissioning the work. Beduzzi’s design for the illusionistic decoration of the church of St. Peter (c. 1708) in Vienna shows that he perpetuated the Bolognese quadratura style, although at times he could be more conventional, as can be seen in the ceiling in the chamber of the Lower Austrian Diet (1710), where a more traditional approach was suited to an assembly room.

In 1708 Beduzzi was appointed imperial stage designer to Joseph I, succeeding Ludovico Ottavio Burnacini. On the Emperor’s death in 1711, Beduzzi designed the catafalque for St. Michael’s, having executed a similar project for the Emperor’s predecessor, Leopold I, in 1705.

=== Architectural work ===
Beduzzi’s architectural work dates from soon after the turn of the century. At the Palais Hatzenberg-Fürstenberg (begun 1702) in the Grünangergasse, Vienna, the wall is treated as a flat expanse defined by the sculptural decoration of the window surrounds. His work is characterized by the absence of architectonic structuring, as at the former Gartenpalais Engelskirchner (1710) for Archduke Rainer at Wieden, Vienna.

As early as c. 1717 he was also in the service of Anton Florian, Prince of Liechtenstein and was responsible for the exterior and interior decoration and furnishings, including the frescoes, for the rebuilding of Schloss Hetzendorf. As engineer to the princes of Liechtenstein from 1721 until his death, Beduzzi redesigned or rebuilt several buildings (e.g. Schloss Feldsberg [now Valtice, Moravia], c. 1724; Neuschloss at Littau, 1731–3), as well as several churches on their estates (e.g. Mährisch Trübau [now Moravská Třebová], 1730; Aussee, 1733, Kosteletz [now Kostelec], 1734; and Lundenburg [now Břeclav], 1734). The churches consist mainly of simple, stereometric blocks with rich decorative detail; their interiors are dramatic, revealing the full expression of the talents he acquired from his experience as a stage and theatre designer.

Among Beduzzi’s other aristocratic patrons were the Daun and Harrach families (to whose palaces in Freyung, Vienna, he contributed in 1716 and 1720 ), as well as the Althans, Dietrichsteins, Hardeggs, Kinskys, Sinzendorfs and Trauns. Beduzzi also designed altars, pulpits, wayside chapels, plague memorial columns (e.g. at Linz, from 1713), mantelpieces, ironwork gates, pageantry props, memorial plaques, commemorative scrolls and sculptures. Many of Beduzzi’s drawings survive (e.g. Vienna, Niederösterreichische Landesbibliothek and Academy of Fine Arts; Melk, Stiftsmuseum; Berlin, Kunstbibliothek; Brno, Moravian Gallery).

Beduzzi died in Vienna in 1735. At his death he was court engineer to the dowager Empress Wilhelmine Amalie in Vienna. His son, Carl Joseph Beduzzi, became a drawing master and engineer.

== Works (selection) ==
- The interior of Melk Abbey for Jakob Prandtauer's baroque reconstruction
- Leopoldsberg church on Leopoldsberg above Klosterneuburg, near Vienna
- The cathedral museum of Passau
- Vienna's Theater am Kärntnertor (the site now occupied by Hotel Sacher)
- The frescos of the Landhaussaal in the Viennese Palais Niederösterreich
- The Dreifaltigkeitssäule in Linz.

== Gallery ==
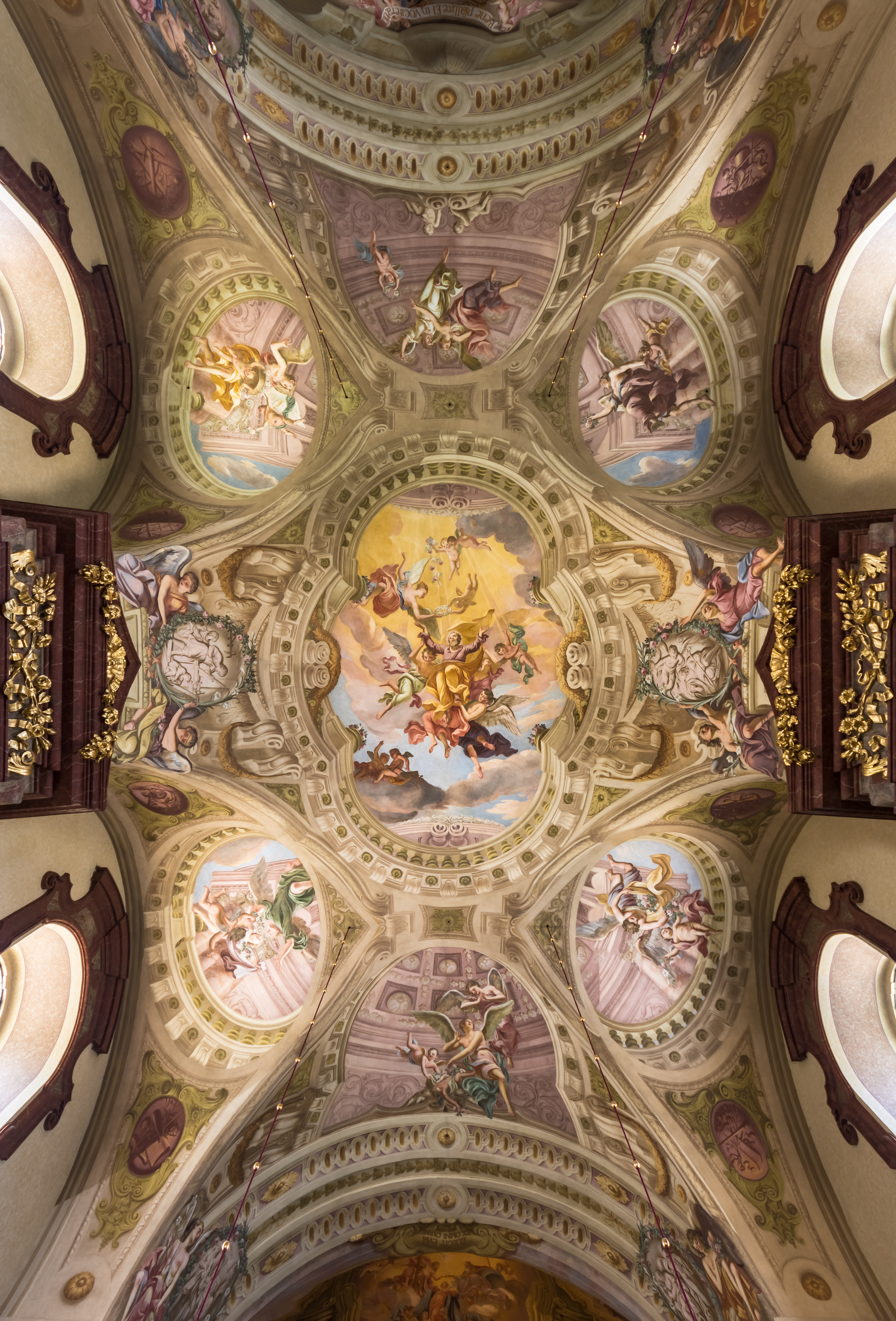
Glorification of Saint Joseph, ceiling fresco in the nave of Maria Taferl Basilica

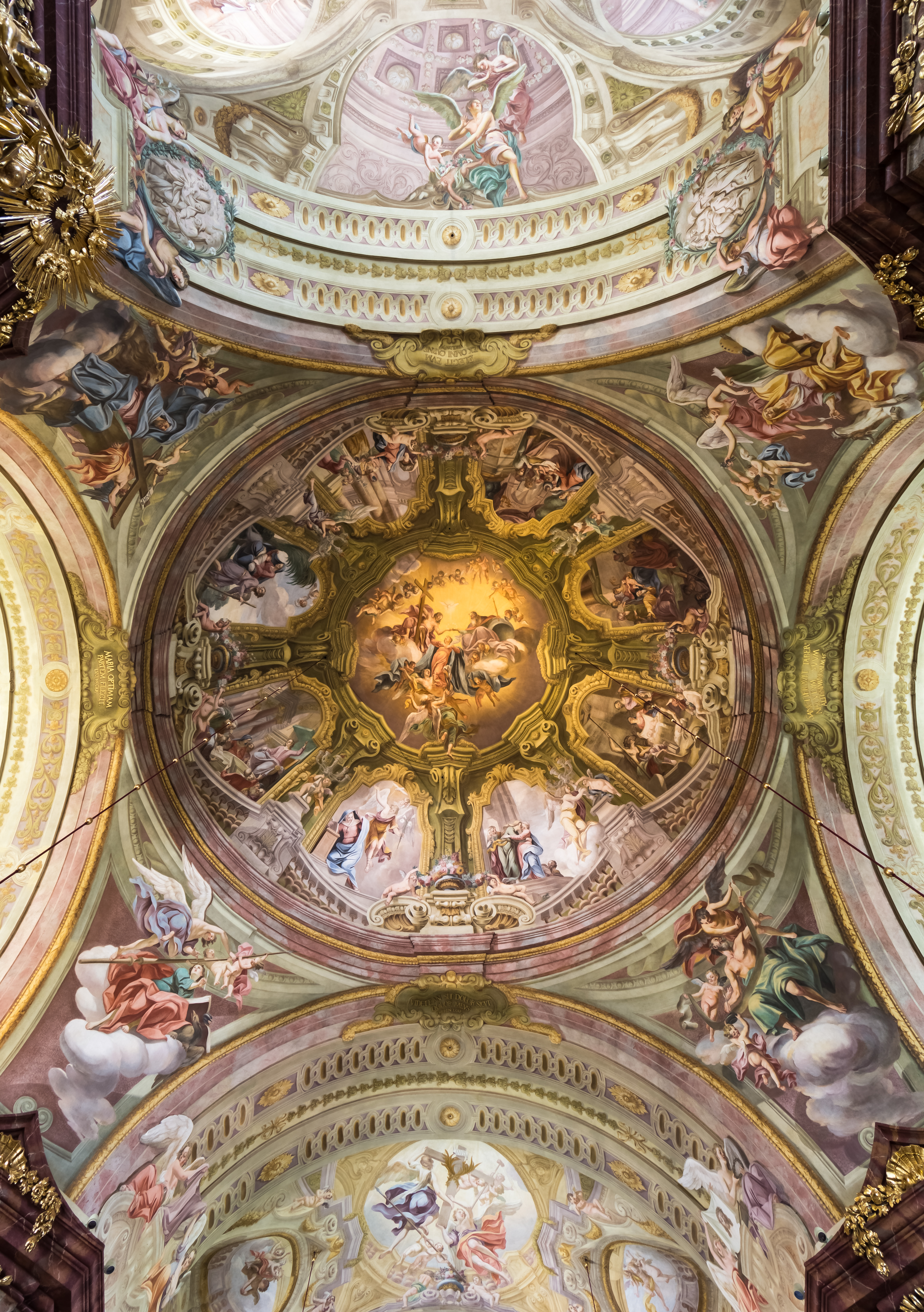
Life and Assumption of Mary

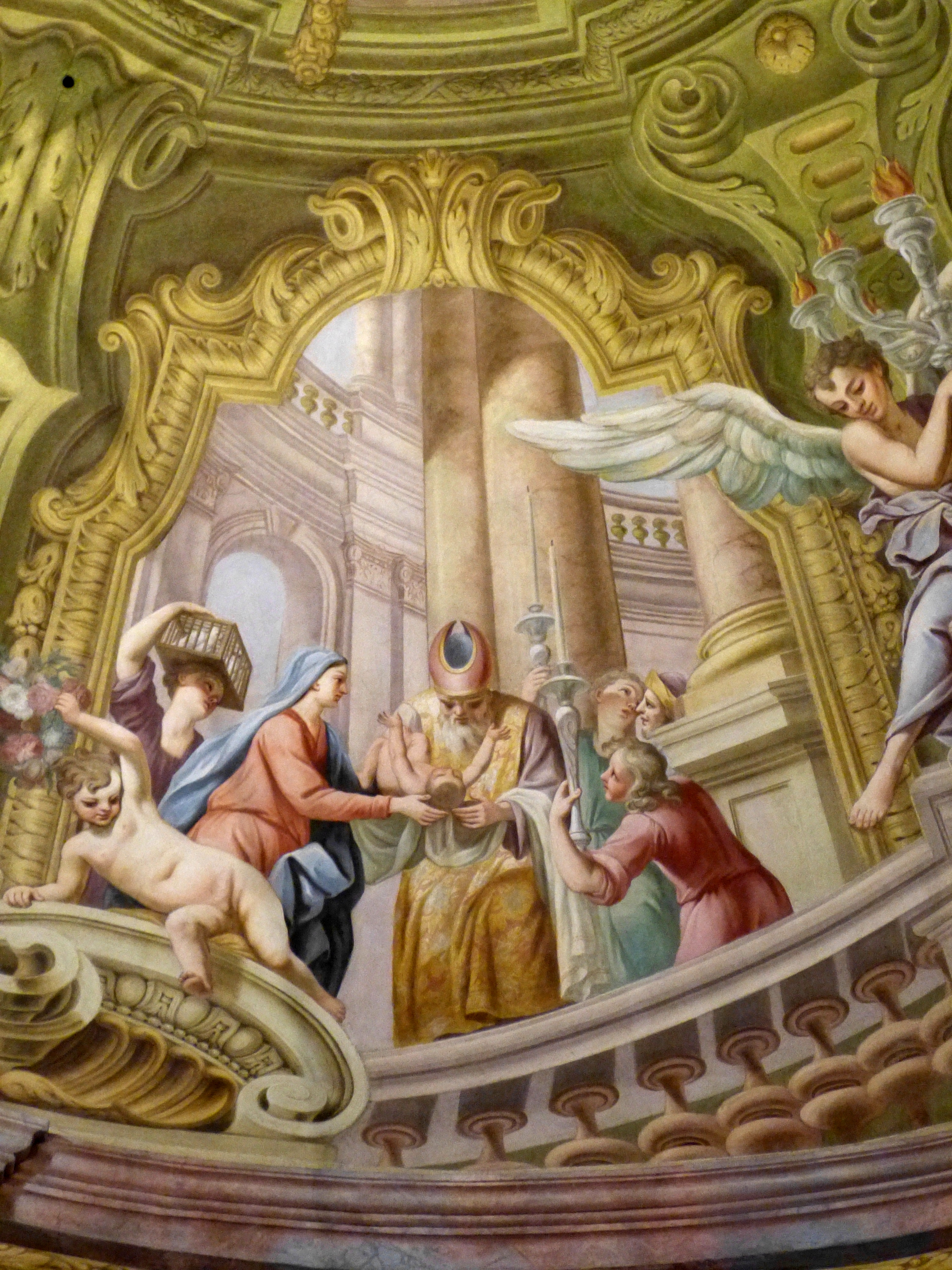
Presentation of Christ in the Temple

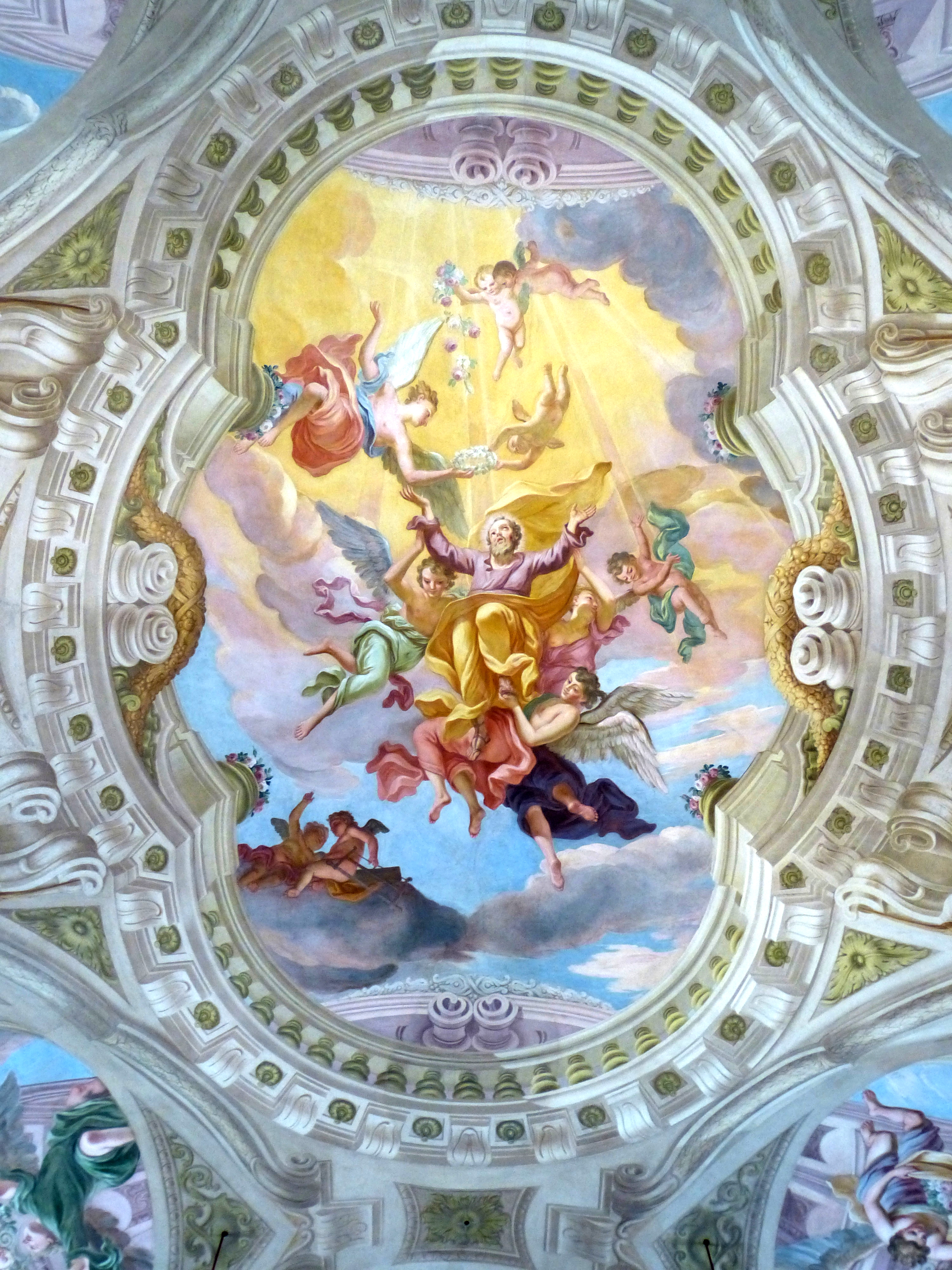
Apotheosis of Saint Joseph

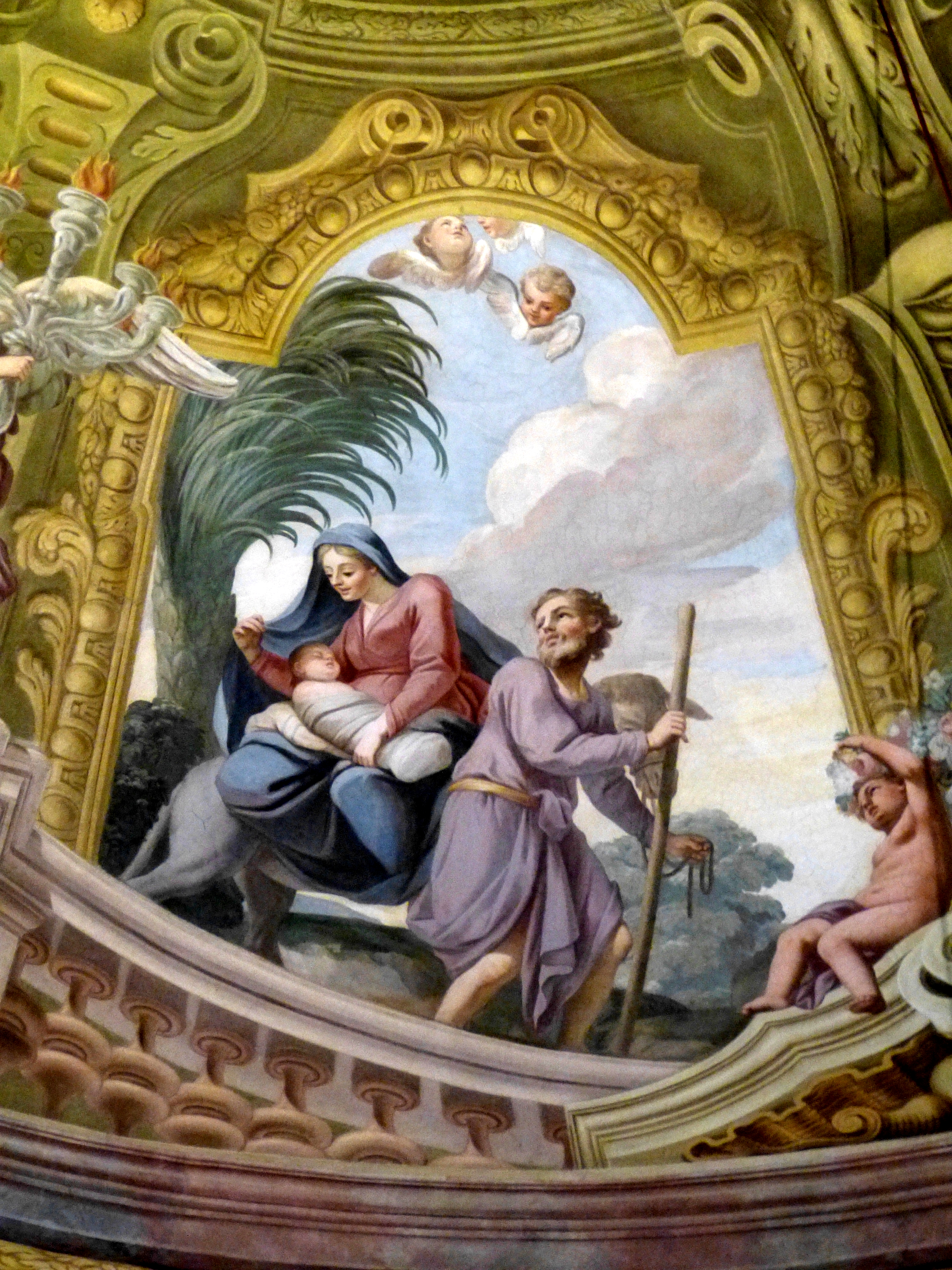
Flight into Egypt

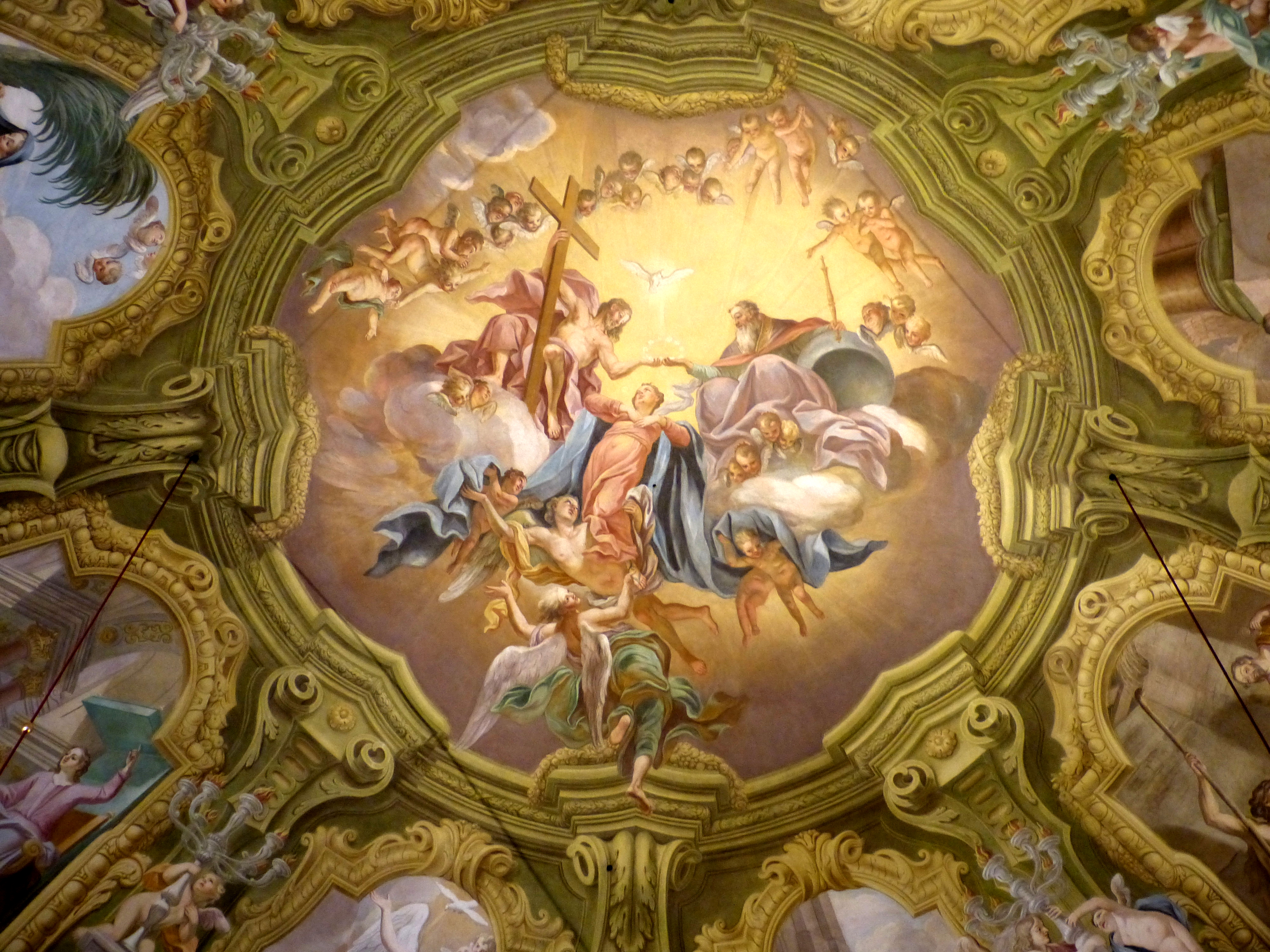
Coronation of Mary

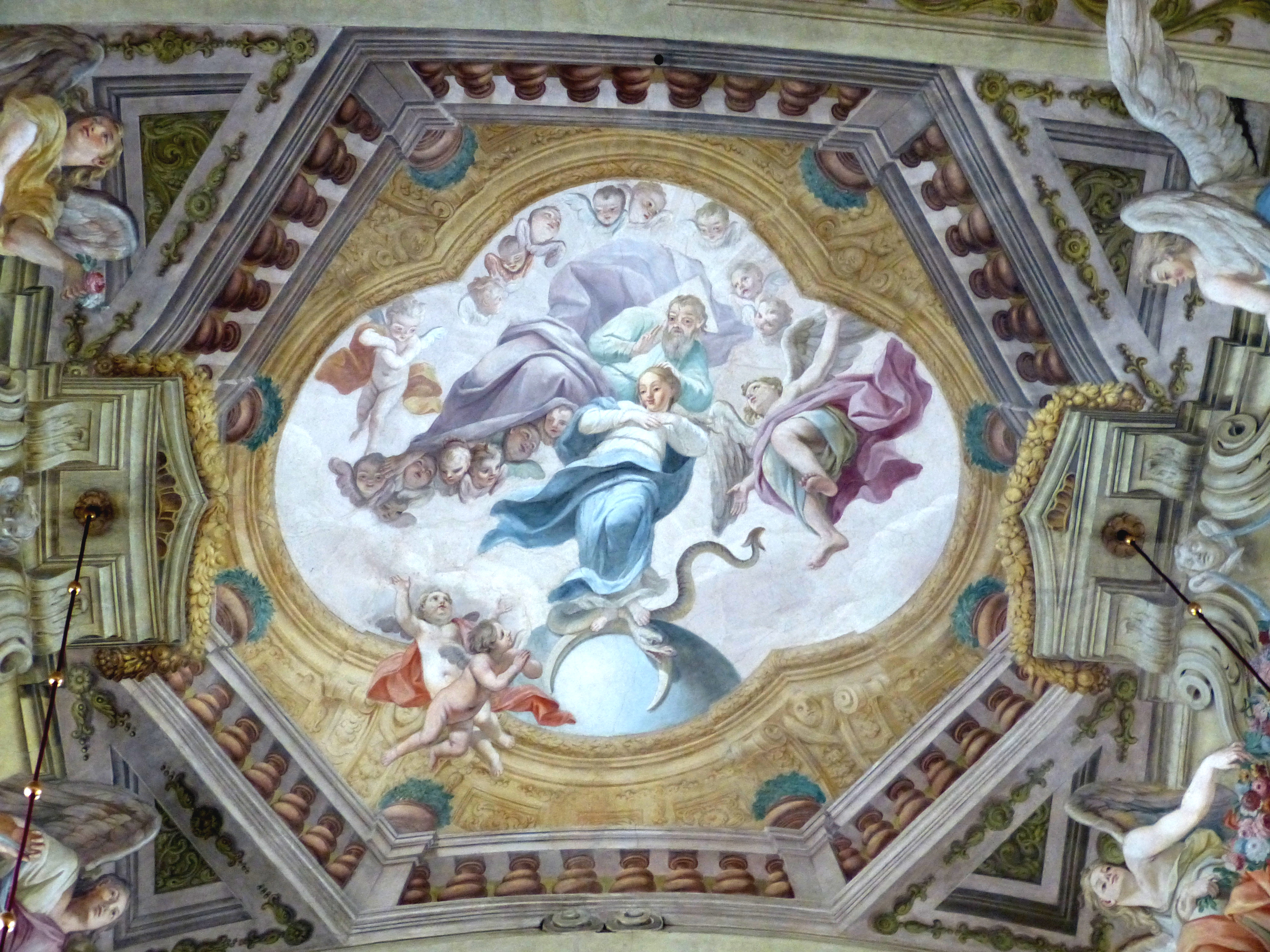
The Immaculate Mary

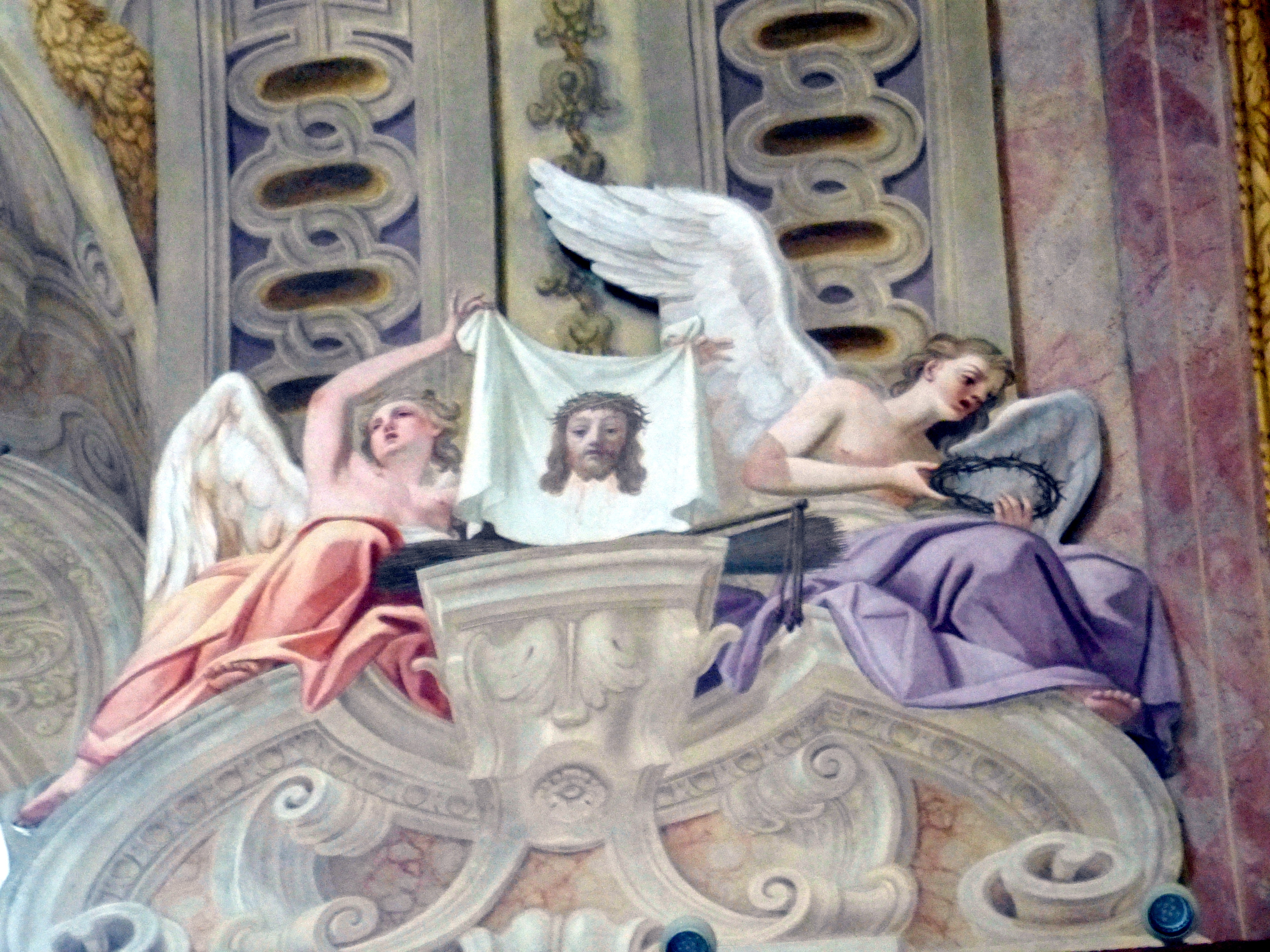
Angels with Veil of Veronica and Crown of Thorns

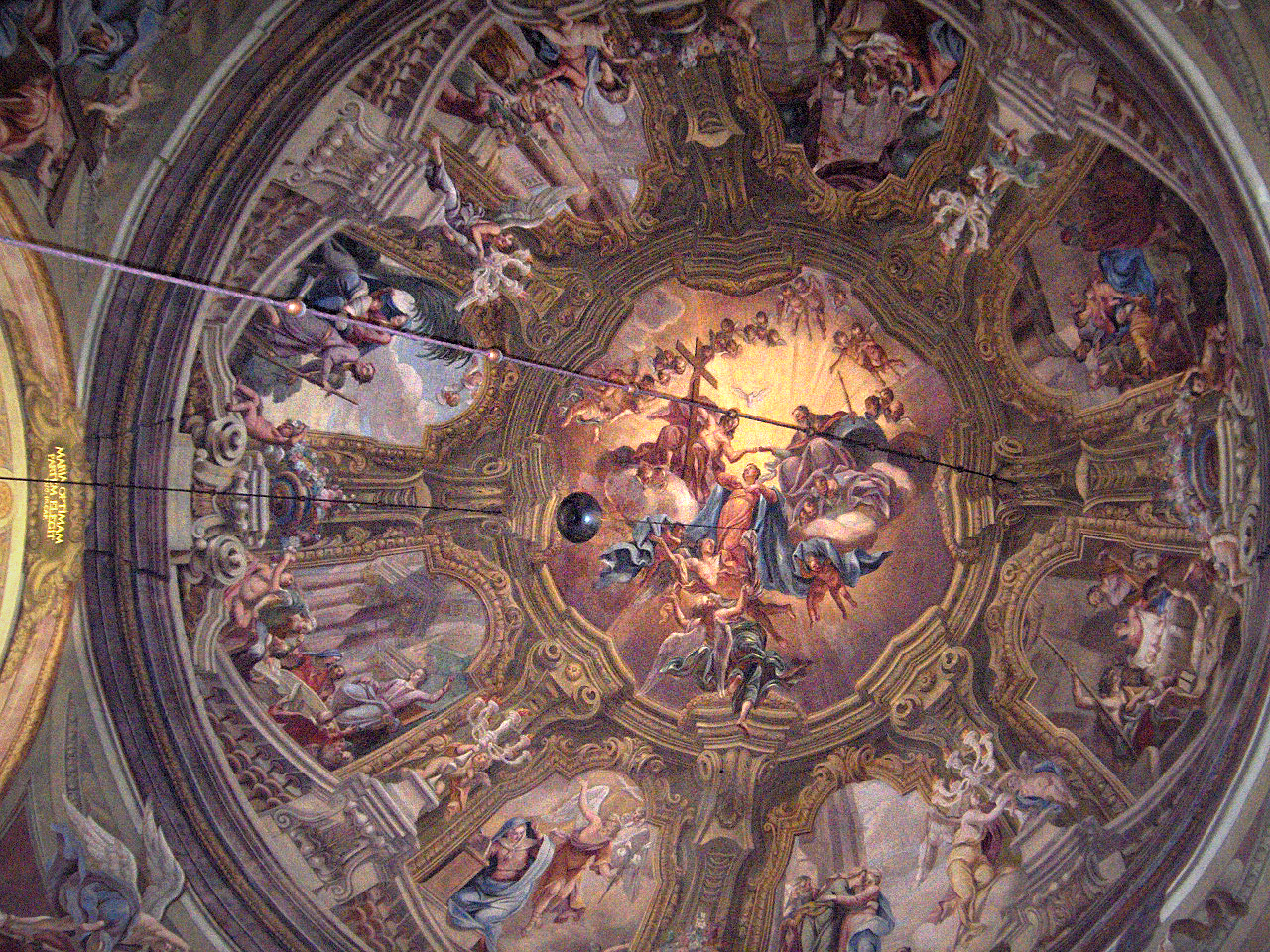
Corporeal Ascension of Mary into Heaven

== Bibliography ==
- Rizzi, W. G. (1979). "Antonio Beduzzi und Johann Lucas von Hildebrandt". Alte und moderne Kunst. 24 (167–8): 36–45.
- Hubala, E. (1981). Johann Michael Rottmayr. Vienna and Munich.
- Rizzi, W. G. (1982). "Zur Baugeschichte des Schlosses Hetzendorf in der Zeit des Hochbarock". Wiener Geschichtsblätter. 37: 65–97.
- Rizzi, W. G. (1983). "Antonio Beduzzi und die bolognesische Dekorationskunst in der Wiener Architektur um 1700". Wien und der europäische Barock: Akten des XXV. internationalen Kongresses für Kunstgeschichte. Wien. pp. 55–63.
- Rizzi, W. G. (1983). "Das ehemalige Palais Engelskirchner auf der Wieden: Ein Werk von Antonio Beduzzi". Wiener Jahrbuch für Kunstgeschichte. 35/36: 233–42. doi:10.7767/wjk.1983.36.1.233.
- Rizzi, W. G. (1983). "Eine wiedergewonnene Zeichnung des Antonio Beduzzi". Österreichische Zeitschrift für Kunst und Denkmalpflege. 37: 27–30.
- Ilg, A. (1984). "Antonio Beduzzi". Berichte und Mitteilungen des Altertums-Vereines zu Wien. 30: 67–77.
- Rizzi, W. G. (1985). "Antonio Beduzzi und die Schlossbauten der Fürsten Liechtenstein in Mähren". In F. Büttner; C. Lenz (eds.). Intuition und Darstellung: Festschrift Erich Hubala. Munich. pp. 211–22.
