= Leopoldsberg =

Mountain in Austria

Coordinates: 48°16′44″N 16°20′43″E

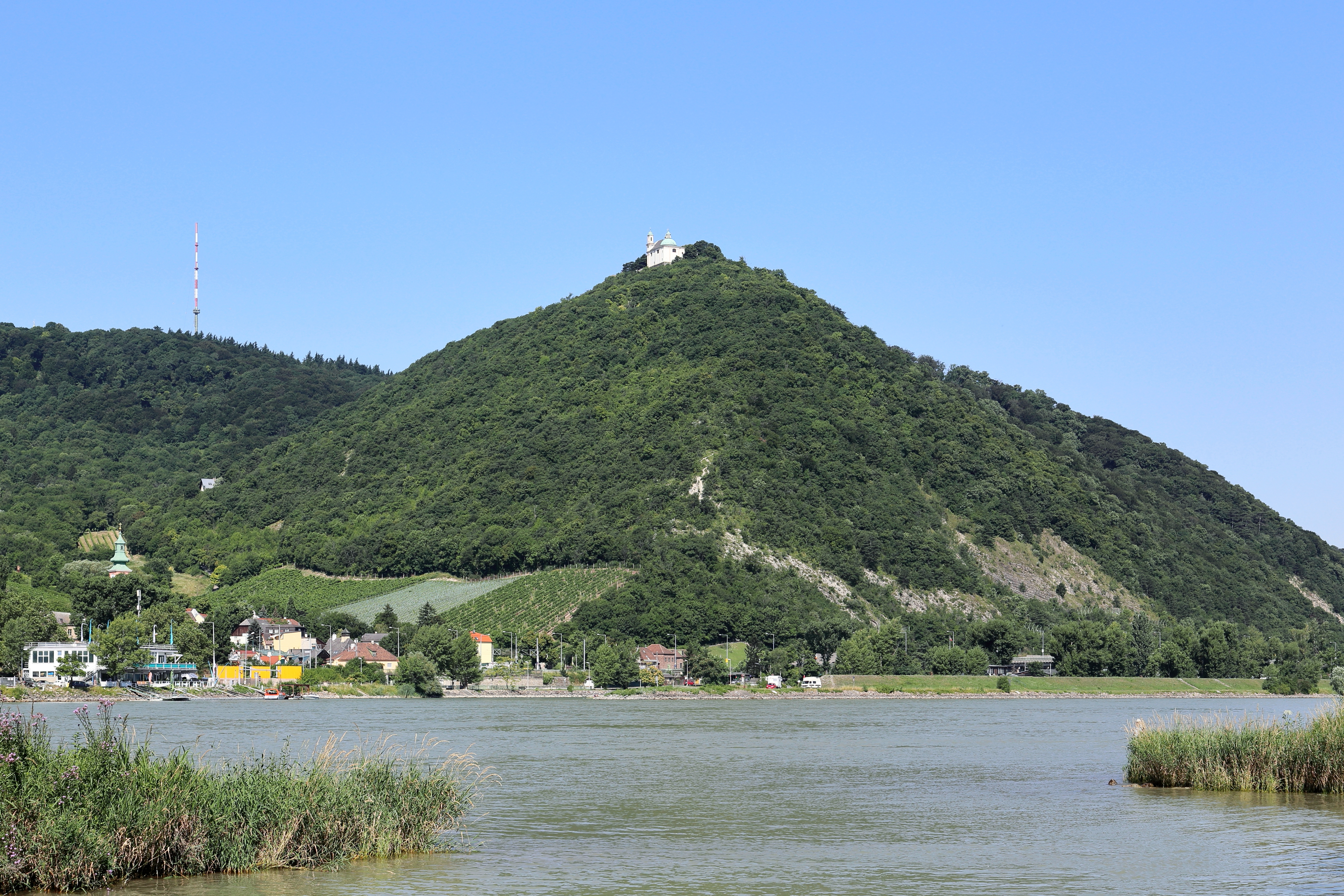
Leopoldsberg

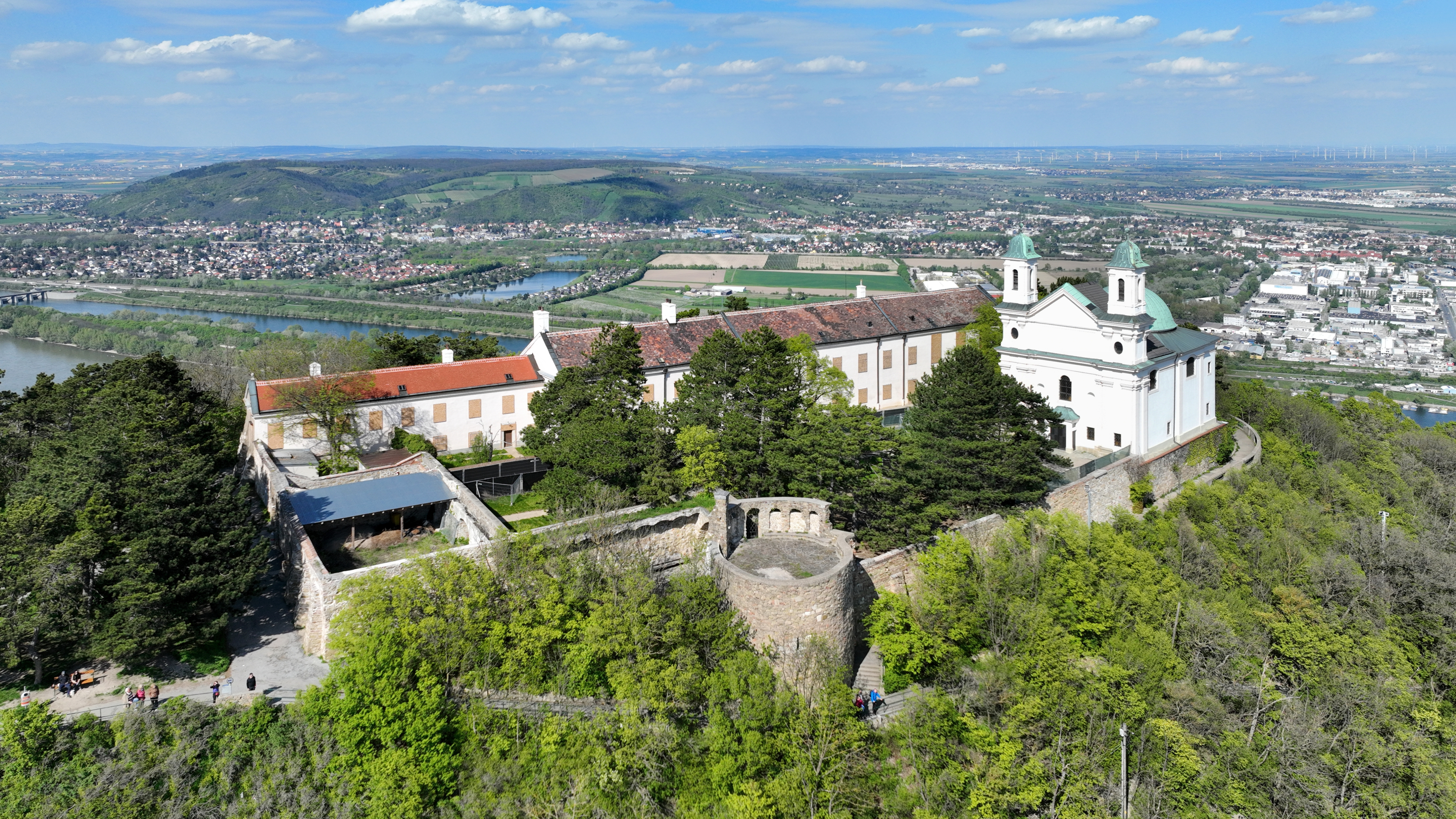
The Leopoldskirche at the summit of Leopoldsberg

The Leopoldsberg (Austrian German pronunciation: [ˈleːopɔldsˌbɛrɡ]; 425 metres [1,394 ft]) is a hill in Vienna, Austria, towering over the Danube and the city. Leopoldberg’s most prominent landmark is the church which stands at the top, and which is clearly visible from Vienna below. Construction of the Leopoldsberg church, dedicated to Saint Leopold, began in 1679; an expansion following a design by Antonio Beduzzi was undertaken 1718–30. Other renovations were to follow. Across the square from the church, on what used to be a tower of the fortification system, a memorial to those Austrians who returned home from captivity after World War II was created in 1948.

== Geography ==
Leopoldberg forms the northeastern corner of the Alps. Alternating layers of marl (rich in carbonate) and sandstone form the parent rock. Unlike most of the mountains of the flysch zone (Upper Cretaceous and Tertiary periods), the Leopoldsberg has steep slopes due to the erosive power of the river Danube on one side and of a small creek on the other. This relief intensifies the differences in local climate and vegetation, which are provided by the borderline between Pannonic and Central European climates. The northern slope is covered with beech forests, the most common forest type of the Wienerwald.

== History ==
Human settlements are known since the Stone Age and especially from Celtic people during the Iron Age. Originally, Roman Vienna or Vindobona was an oppidum (proto-urban settlement) on the Leopoldsberg. It belonged to the Celtic kingdom of Noricum, but the Emperor Augustus (through his general Tiberius) added the oppidum to Pannonia, which became a formal province during the second half of the reign of Claudius (41-54 BC). Through the centuries, the mountain, especially the southern slope, was bare of forest and used for vineyards and grazing. Leopoldsberg therefore had the name “Kahlenberg” ("Bald hill", as it was the “bare” or kahl of the two) until 1693 when the baroque church was built on top of the second, at which time the name was transferred to the neighboring mountain (the Sauberg, modern-day Kahlenberg). In 1683, modern-day Kahlenberg was the meeting point of King Jan III Sobieski’s Polish-Austrian troops, who defeated the Turkish invaders and liberated the city of Vienna during the Second Siege of Vienna.

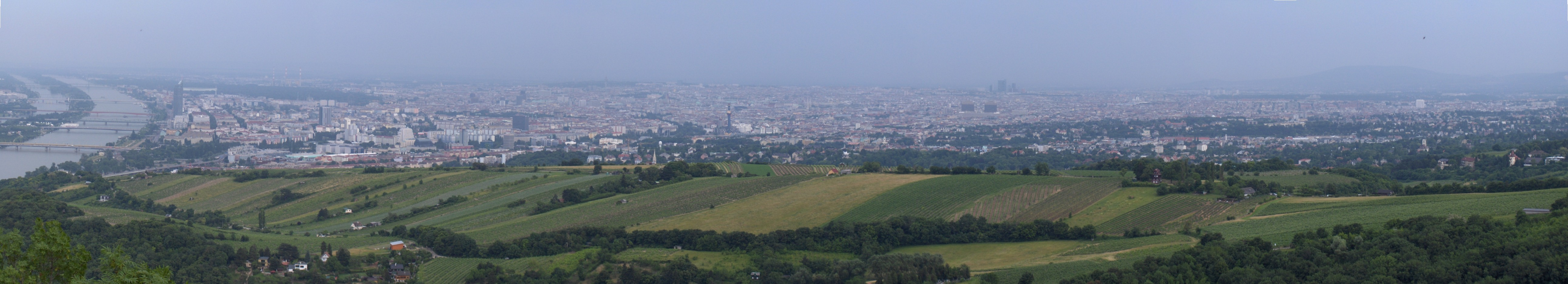
Panoramic view of Vienna from Leopoldsberg

== Transportation ==
Leopoldsberg and neighboring Kahlenberg can be reached by car or by bus (Bus line 38A) via the Kahlenbergerstraße from Nußdorf (today the end station of the tram-line D), which passes several heuriger as it climbs the mountain. The leisurely hike up Kahlenbergerstraße is a favorite Sunday excursion for many Viennese, young and old, and the path is paved all the way to the top.

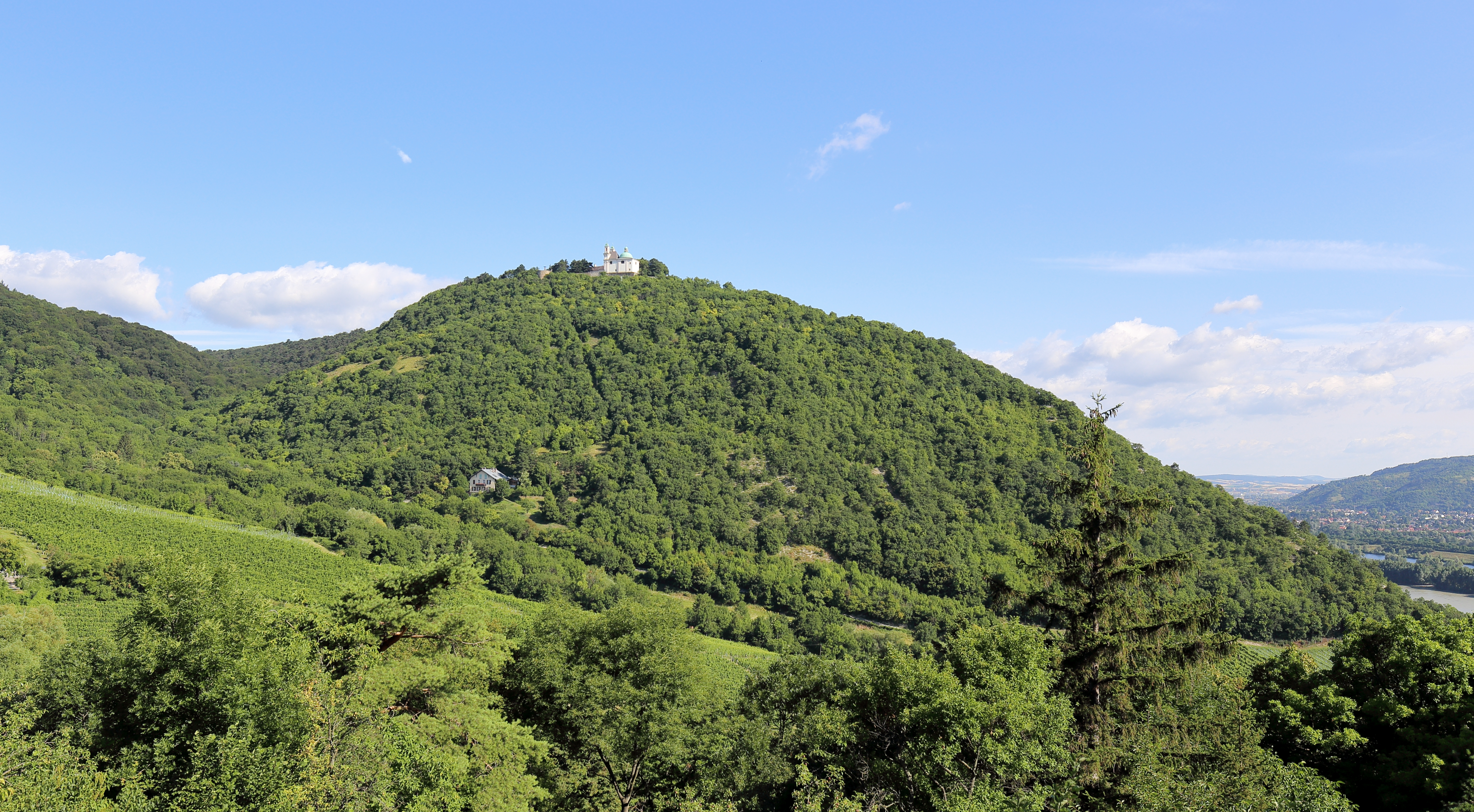
Leopoldsberg from the south

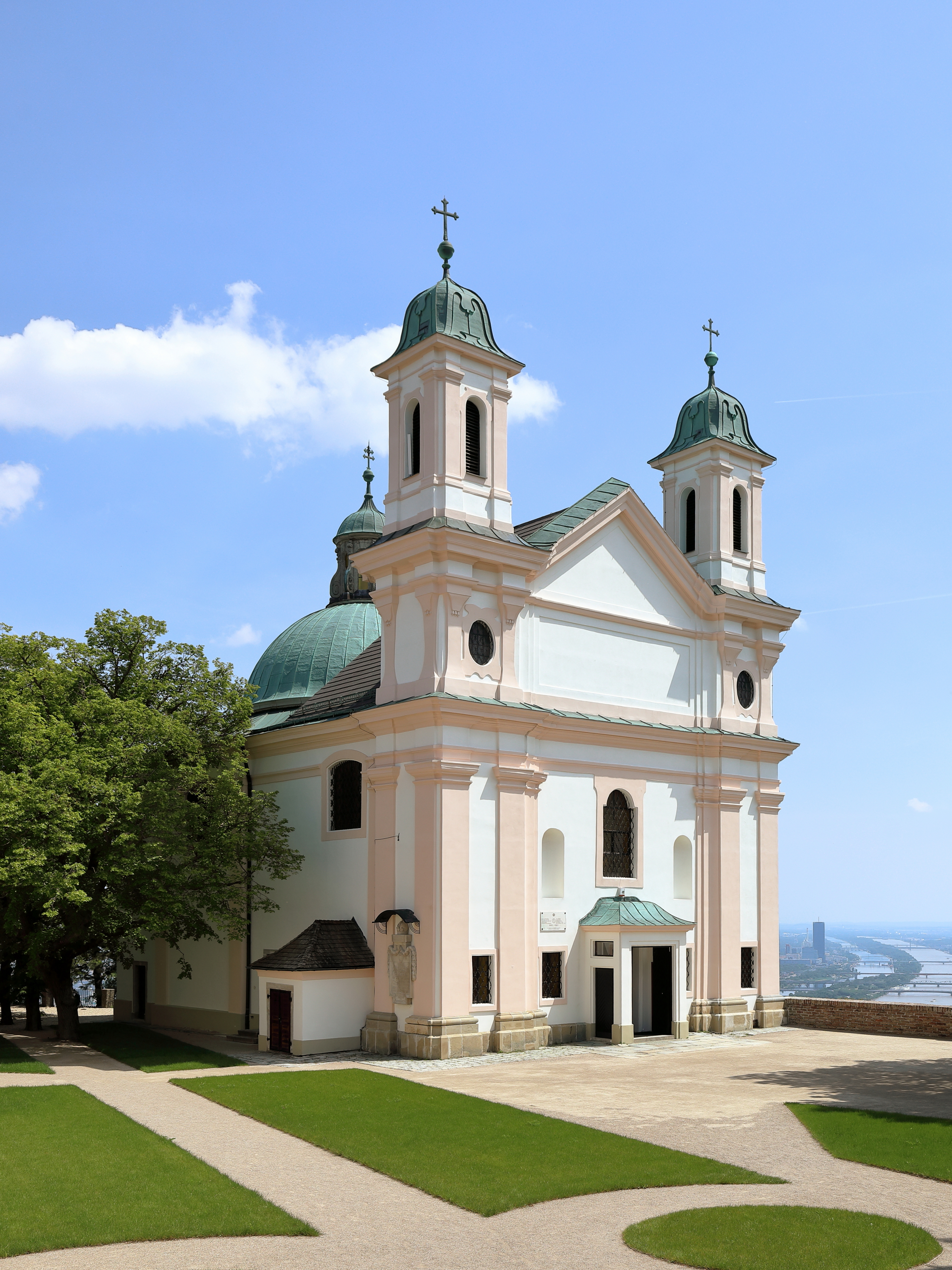
Leopoldskirche

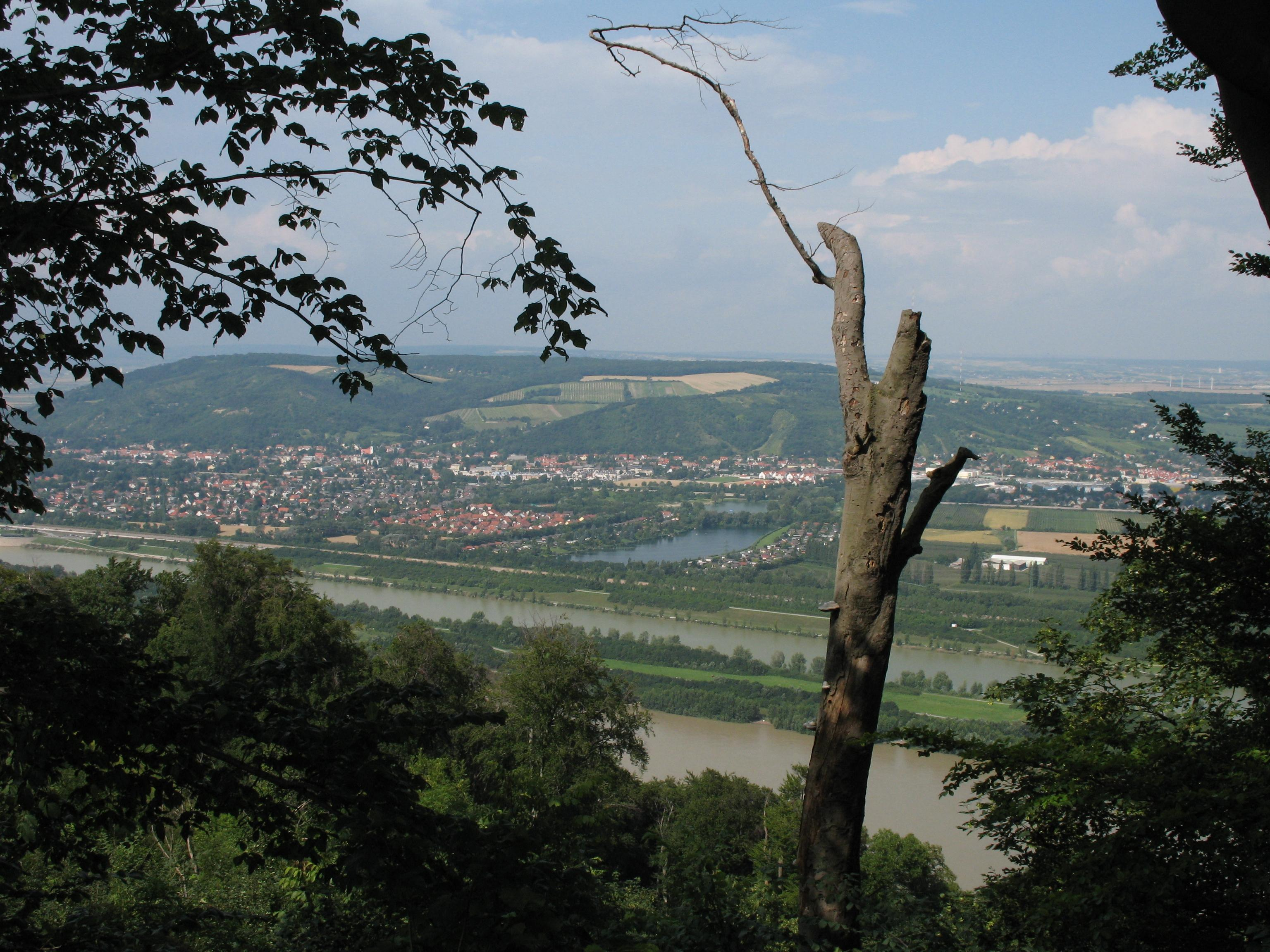
View on Langenzersdorf

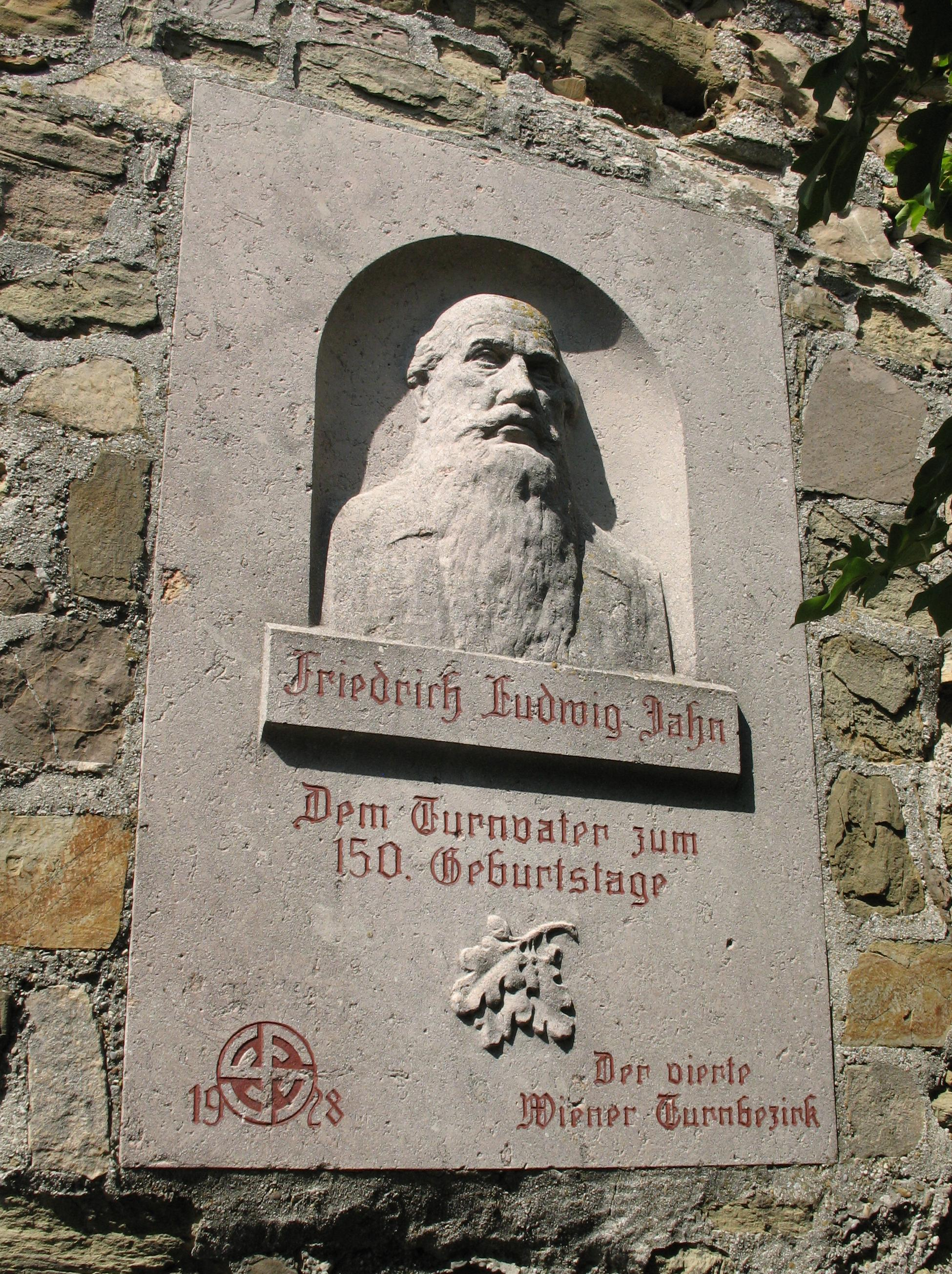
Jahn memorial

Klosterneuburg commemorative coin

== See also ==
Leopoldsberg and the Klosterneuburg was recently selected as a main motif for a high value collectors' coin: the Klosterneuburg commemorative coin. The obverse shows a view of the abbey from the slopes of the Leopoldsberg in the Alps. The Romanesque-Gothic basilica as well as the copper dome with the imperial crown can be seen.
