= Leopoldsberg church =

Coordinates: 48°16′40.2″N 16°20′49.1″E

- Church of St. Leopold at Leopoldsberg
- Kirche am Leopoldsberg
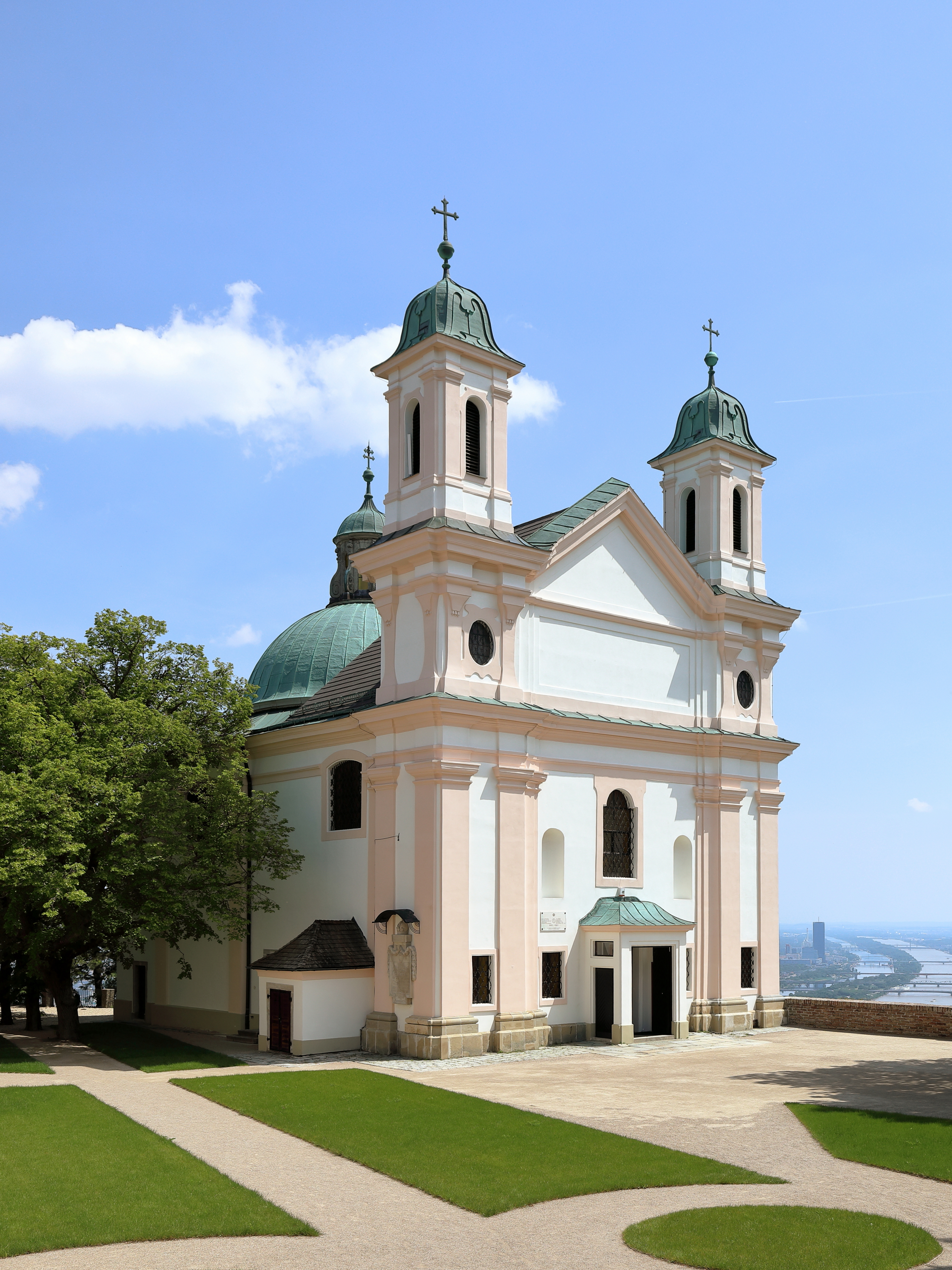
- Leopoldsberg church
- Location: Kahlenbergerdorf
- Country: Austria
- Denomination: Roman Catholic
- Website: http://www.leopoldsberg-kirche.at

Architecture
- Style: Baroque

The Leopoldsberg church (also church of St. Leopold at Leopoldsberg, German: Leopoldsbergkirche) is a Roman Catholic quasi-parochial church in the Kahlenbergerdorf area of Döbling (the 19th district of Vienna). It is dedicated to Saint Margrave Leopold and is attached to the parish church of Nussdorf.

After being closed for a long time for repairs, the church was opened to the public in June 2018.

== History ==
The original St. George chapel in the Leopoldsberg castle was blown up during the first Turkish siege of Vienna, Emperor Leopold I during the plague in Vienna in 1679 had built on the Leopoldsberg (at the time still Kahlenberg) a new church dedicated to the Margrave Leopold III (of Babenbergs), who was canonized in 1485. In 1683 during the second Turkish siege of Vienna the just-completed chapel built in the shape of a cross with a central cupola and four cross arms was set on fire and plundered. After repairs the chapel was consecrated in 1693. The architect of the original building from 1693 is not known. With the completion of the church, the hill was renamed: the designation "Kahlenberg" went to the neighboring higher hill (previously Sauberg), and the mountain with the Leopold chapel was given the name "Leopoldsberg".

The church was furnished with important pieces of religious art, including a highly venerated depiction of St. Mary called "Maria Türkenhilfe".

Around 1720 the chapel was expanded into a church by Antonio Beduzzi; the building remains essentially unchanged since then. In the course of the Josephinism the church was desecrated around 1784, but was rededicated in 1798 under Joseph's nephew Francis II.

On February 7, 1945, an allied forces' bomb destroyed about a third of the church; among other things, the south tower was completely demolished. The reconstruction work that began soon afterwards reverted the church to its 1720 shape with the baroque towers instead of the classical ones built in 1824.

== Description ==
Plan of the church with construction stages color-coded: █ 1679–1693, █ 1717–1730

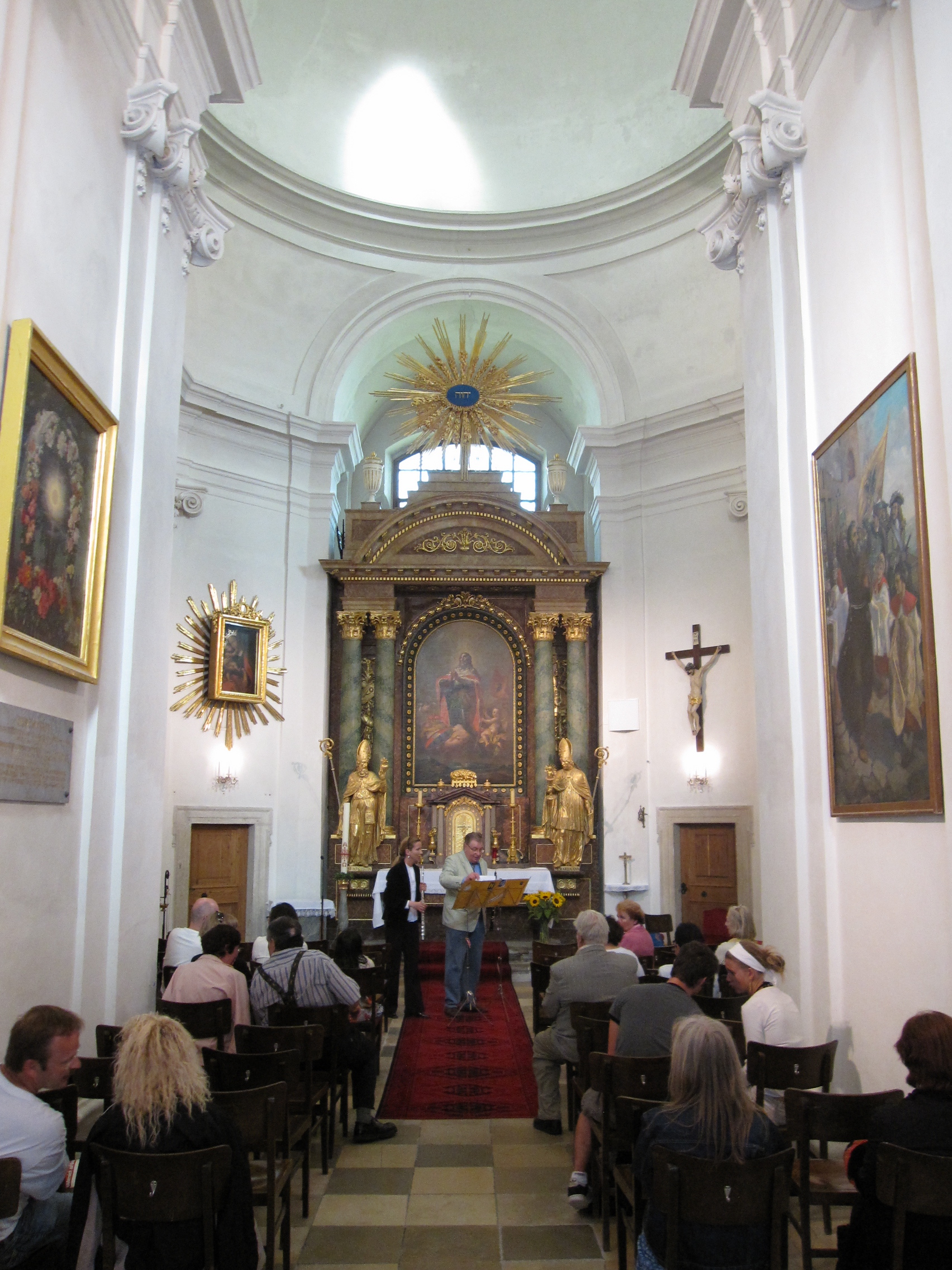
Main altar

The central part of the church is designed in early baroque style with anteroom, diagonal side rooms and a surrounding gallery. The facade is double-towered creating a striking effect at the distance.

The brick building of the church is rough-plastered and painted (gray color at the turn of the 20th century, white and yellow in the 21st century) with expansive profiled cornices. Its grooved base sits on a platform with high retaining wall made of rubble.

The main (western) facade has a large protruding cornice that separates the main level at the bottom and the gable top. On both sides of the framed doorway the lower level if bounded by the groups of pilasters with rectangular windows in between. Above the doorway there is a rounded top window flanked by two empty niches. At the gable level another cornice separates the attic, the cornice is supported by two pairs of smaller pilasters matching the ones below, round windows are used to separate the pilaster in the pair. The same pilasters also frame the base level of two small towers located in the corners of the main facade. A flat gable is finished by yet another cornice at the top. Each tower has a round windows in the base level and a round top window with a wedge stone in the main level that is framed by flat pilasters. The towers are crowned with an entablature (that used to have a triglyph design), cornice and, at the top, an onion tin roof with a steeple ball and a cross.

Northern and southern walls are similar: the sides of the anteroom are bordered with pilasters. The northern wall has two arched top windows with wide mullions, a small extension close to the anteroom with a rectangular window next to it, and a door at the eastern end that used to be bricked-up. The southern wall for the main volume is split with two pilasters into three more fields, the first one from the west contains a wide arched window and a stone-framed rectangular window; the second has a single wide arched window; the eastern one has two framed rectangular windows at different levels.

The altar part of the eastern wall has a large arched window and protrudes slightly, the northern part of the eastern wall has a rectangular window in the upper level.

Several commemorative plaques are attached to the outer walls of the church. In particular, a 1904 plaque describes a visit by Empress Elisabeth of Austria in May 1896.

== Sources ==
- Tietze, Hans (1908). "Kirche zum hl. Leopold". Die Denkmale der Stadt Wien (XI.-XXI. Bezirk) (in German). A. Schroll. pp. 442–443.
