= Frauenzell Abbey =

Monastery in Bavaria, Germany

Coordinates: 49°03′21″N 12°22′14″E

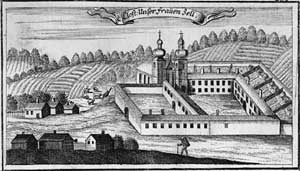
Engraving of Frauenzell from the "Churbaierische Atlas" of Anton Wilhelm Ertl, 1687

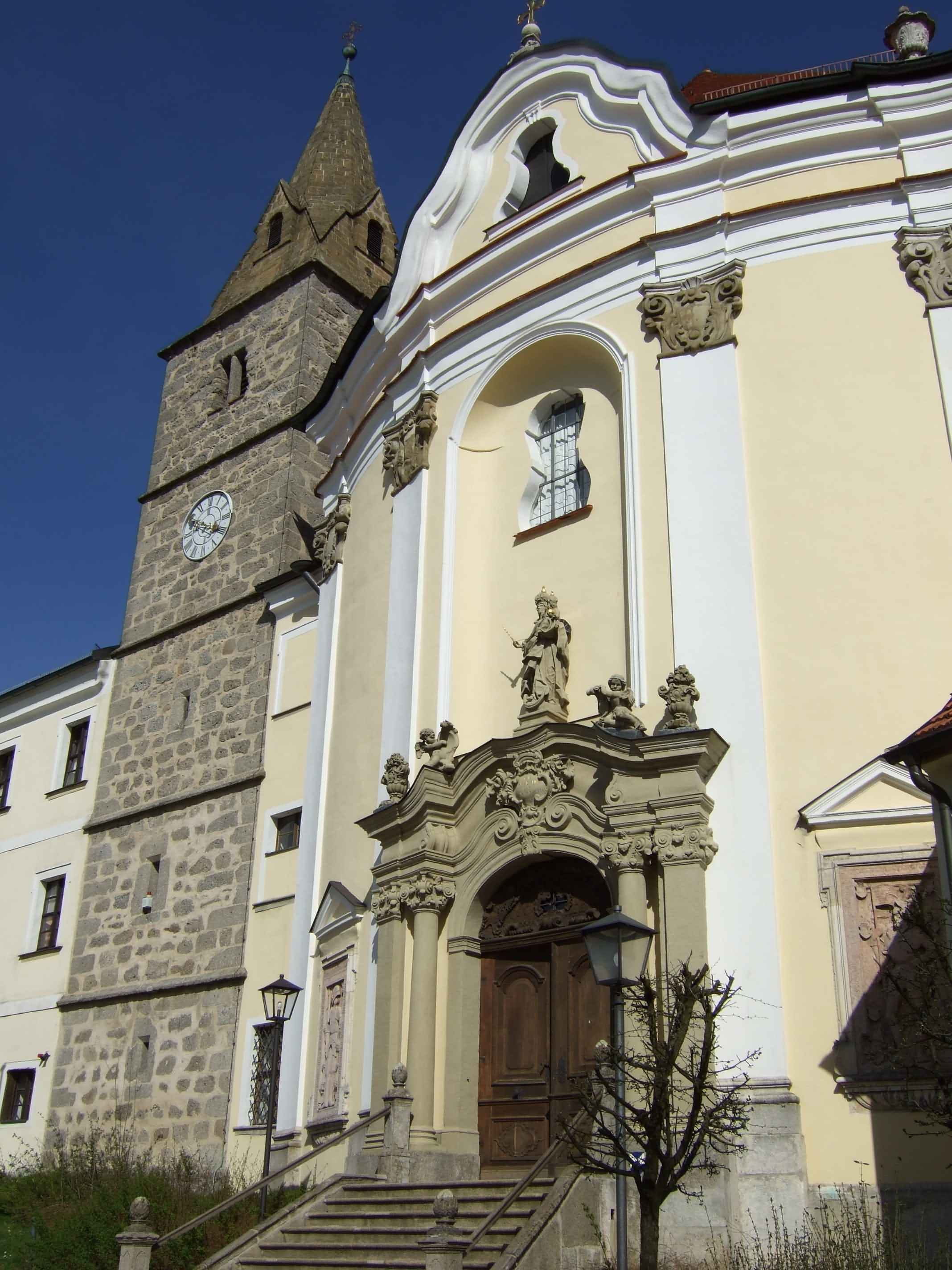
Former abbey church

Frauenzell Abbey (German: Kloster Frauenzell) was a Benedictine monastery situated in Frauenzell, which is part of Brennberg in Bavaria, Germany.

Dedicated to the Virgin Mary, the monastery was founded in 1321 by Count Reinmar IV von Brennberg, developing an existing hermitage. At first a cell of Oberalteich Abbey, it became a dependent priory in 1350 and was granted the status of an independent abbey in 1424.

It was dissolved in 1803 in the secularisation of the period. Some of the buildings were used for the accommodation of the school and the minister's house; the rest were sold to the villagers. The monastic church remains as a parish and pilgrimage church.
